= West Indian cricket team in England in 1973 =

International cricket tour

The West Indian cricket team in England in 1973 played 17 first-class matches including three Tests. The team won the series against England by two matches to nil, with one drawn game. It also won the Prudential Trophy for the one-day series.

== The West Indies team ==
The West Indies team was captained by Rohan Kanhai, who had succeeded Gary Sobers as captain for the Australian series in the West Indies the previous winter.

The West Indies side had dropped back in form from its peak in the mid-1960s, with the retirement of its great fast bowlers Charlie Griffith and Wes Hall and some of its leading batsmen, such as Conrad Hunte and Basil Butcher. The period under Sobers' captaincy after the series victory in England in 1966 was not particularly successful, and Test series against England were lost in 1967–68 and in 1969. India won in the West Indies in 1970–71, and the first-ever New Zealand tour to the West Indies in 1971–72 produced a series in which all five Tests were drawn.

Sobers' handing over of the captaincy to Kanhai did not bring a change of fortune. Australia won the 1972–73 Test series by two matches to nil with three draws to retain the Frank Worrell Trophy that Bill Lawry had won by beating Sobers' side in 1968–69. As England had beaten Australia in Australia in 1970–71 and had retained The Ashes in a drawn series in 1972, the West Indians were regarded in 1973 as the underdogs for the series against England.

The original side for the 1973 tour was:

- Rohan Kanhai, captain
- Lance Gibbs, vice-captain
- Keith Boyce
- Steve Camacho
- Maurice Foster
- Roy Fredericks
- Vanburn Holder
- Inshan Ali
- Bernard Julien
- Alvin Kallicharran
- Clive Lloyd
- David Murray, wicketkeeper
- Deryck Murray, wicketkeeper
- Lawrence Rowe
- Grayson Shillingford
- Elquemedo Willett

Camacho suffered a broken cheekbone while batting in the second first-class match of the tour and took no further part: the bowler who inflicted the injury, Hampshire's Andy Roberts, would make his West Indies debut within a year. Lawrence Rowe had strained ligaments in the previous winter's series against Australia and withdrew from the tour when it was apparent that the injury was not getting better. Camacho was replaced by Ron Headley, highly experienced in English conditions from a long career at Worcestershire. Gary Sobers, who opted out of the tour after knee surgery and played the 1973 English cricket season instead with Nottinghamshire, was drafted in for the three Test matches.

Of the starting tour party, only David Murray, Inshan Ali and Willett had not toured or played county cricket in England before, and only Julien and David Murray had not played Test cricket. Ron Headley was also new to Test matches in this series.

The touring side was managed by the former West Indies cricketer, Esmond Kentish.

== Test series ==
=== 1st Test ===
26–31 July 1973
(5-day match)
Scorecard

West Indies	v	England
415 (145 overs); CH Lloyd 132 (196); GG Arnold 5/113 (39 overs)		257 (98.1 overs); G Boycott 97 (227); KD Boyce 5/70 (22 overs)
255 (87.1 overs); AI Kallicharran 80 (139); GG Arnold 3/49 (18.1 overs)		255 (105.1 overs); FC Hayes 106* (234); KD Boyce 6/77 (21.1 overs)

West Indies won by 158 runs
The Oval, London
Umpires: DJ Constant and TW Spencer

- West Indies won the toss and elected to bat.
- 29 July was taken as a rest day.
- FC Hayes (ENG), and RGA Headley and BD Julien (both WIN) made their Test debuts.

West Indies' first innings was built around a fourth wicket partnership of 208 between Clive Lloyd, who made 132, and Kallicharran (80) and enlivened by a late 72 from Boyce. Boyce was then the pick of the bowlers with five wickets for 70 as England collapsed 257 all out after being 247 for five. Only Geoffrey Boycott, with 97, passed 40. West Indies' second innings featured Ron Headley's highest Test score (42, in his first match), plus the second 80 of the match from Kallicharran and 51 from Sobers. Boyce improved his figures in the England second innings, taking six for 77, with three for 61 from Gibbs. The main resistance came from Frank Hayes, who scored an undefeated 106 in his first Test match. Boyce's match figures of 11 for 147 were the best for West Indies versus England at the time (subsequently beaten by Michael Holding with 14 for 149, also at The Oval, in 1976).

=== 2nd Test ===
9–14 August 1973
(5-day match)
Scorecard

West Indies	v	England
327 (149.3 overs); RC Fredericks 150 (443); DL Underwood 3/40 (24.3 overs)		305 (156.4 overs); G Boycott 56 (155); DL Amiss 56 (165); GS Sobers 3/62 (30 overs)
302 (103.4 overs); CH Lloyd 94 (139); GG Arnold 4/43 (20 overs)		182/2 (67 overs); DL Amiss 86* (186); CH Lloyd 2/26 (12 overs)

Match drawn
Edgbaston, Birmingham
Umpires: HD Bird and AE Fagg

- West Indies won the toss and elected to bat.
- 12 August was taken as a rest day.

Defensive tactics by the West Indies and a dispute involving umpire Arthur Fagg marked a game which ended as a fairly tame draw. On the first day, West Indies scored just 190 runs, with 98 of them to the normally attacking Roy Fredericks, who went on to reach 150 on day two. England captain Ray Illingworth bowled 27 overs for 18 runs in the day. Three England batsmen (Boycott, Dennis Amiss and Keith Fletcher) reached fifties, but none went much further and Boycott was injured in a collision with wicketkeeper Deryck Murray. On the third day, umpire Fagg refused to take the field over the West Indies' querying of a not-out decision in favour of Boycott, but he resumed after one over. England were little more enterprising than the West Indies, whose over rate was also very slow. The match was two-thirds over before the first two innings were concluded: West Indies' second innings, with 94 from Lloyd and 74 from Sobers, was faster, but England never attempted a task of 325 in 230 minutes.

=== 3rd Test ===
23–27 August 1973
(5-day match)
Scorecard

West Indies	v	England
652/8d (168.4 overs); RB Kanhai 157 (280); RGD Willis 4/118 (35 overs)		233 (73 overs); KWR Fletcher 68 (129); KD Boyce 4/50 (20 overs)
		193 (f/o) (65.3 overs); KWR Fletcher 86* (132); KD Boyce 4/49 (16 overs)

West Indies won by an innings and 226 runs
Lord's, London
Umpires: HD Bird and CS Elliott

- West Indies won the toss and elected to bat.
- 26 August was taken as a rest day.
- The match was scheduled for five days but completed in four.

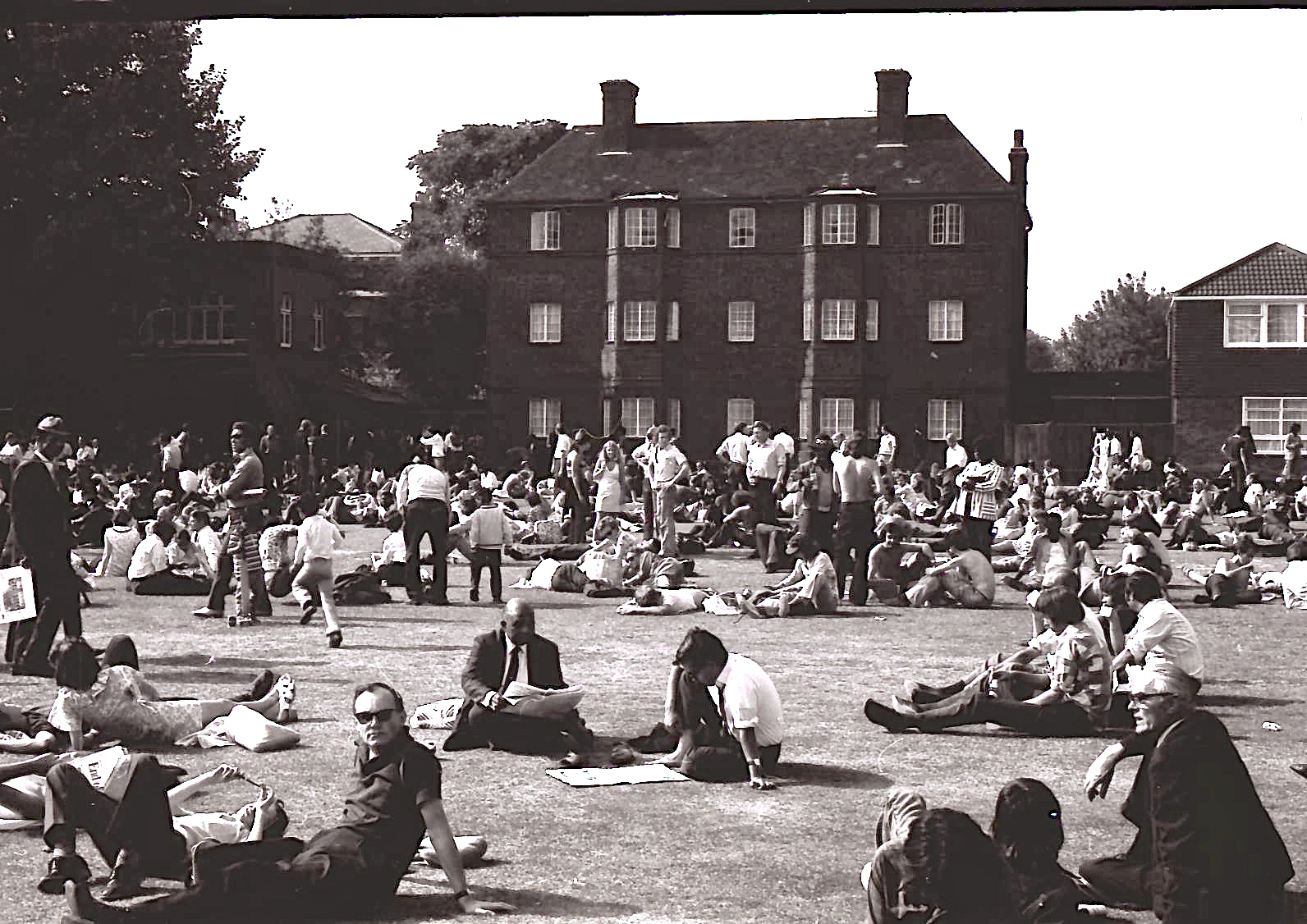
The Nursery Ground at Lord's during the bomb scare

England's second worst defeat in Test cricket at this stage came as they were totally outplayed. For West Indies, Kanhai (157), Sobers (150 not out) and a maiden Test century from Julien (121) led to a huge total, at the time the highest by a West Indies Test team in England. Only Fletcher, with 68, coped with hostile bowling from Vanburn Holder and Boyce, and when England followed on Fletcher was again the main resistance, scoring an undefeated 86. A bomb scare on the Saturday led to the ground being evacuated for 85 minutes; it was decided to add extra time to each of the remaining days of the match, but with the West Indies winning with a day and a half to spare it was not needed.

== ODI series ==
Two 55-overs-per-side matches were played for the Prudential Trophy. England were captained for the first time by Mike Denness, who succeeded Ray Illingworth.

=== 1st ODI ===
5 September 1973
Scorecard

West Indies; 181 (54 overs)	v	England; 182/9 (54.3 overs)
RB Kanhai 55 (75); DL Underwood 3/30 (11 overs)		MH Denness 66 (117); VA Holder 2/34 (11 overs)

England won by 1 wicket
Headingley, Leeds
Umpires: CS Elliott (ENG) and AE Fagg (ENG)
Player of the match: MH Denness (ENG)

- West Indies won the toss and elected to bat.
- MH Denness, M Hendrick, CM Old, MJ Smith, RW Taylor and RGD Willis, and all the West Indies team, made their ODI debuts.

The captains top-scored for their teams (Kanhai with 55, Denness with 66); Chris Old and Derek Underwood each took three wickets as West Indies' middle order failed to build on a good start; Tony Greig took England to the brink of victory with 48, but three quick wickets then left last pair Underwood and Bob Willis to score six to win. Denness was Man of the Match.

=== 2nd ODI ===
7 September 1973
Scorecard

England; 189/9 (55 overs)	v	West Indies; 190/2 (42.2 overs)
KWR Fletcher 63 (80); MLC Foster 2/22 (5 overs)		RC Fredericks 105 (122); GG Arnold 2/24 (9 overs)

West Indies won by 8 wickets
The Oval, London
Umpires: AEG Rhodes (ENG) and TW Spencer (ENG)
Player of the match: RC Fredericks (WIN)

- England won the toss and elected to bat.
- JA Jameson and D Lloyd (both ENG), and RGA Headley and DA Murray (both WIN) made their ODI debuts.

A comfortable victory for West Indies won them the Prudential Trophy for a faster scoring rate over the two games. Only Keith Fletcher, with 63, shone in England's innings as Lance Gibbs bowled his 11 overs for just 12 runs and Clive Lloyd, drafted in to bowl because Sobers was unfit, took two for 25. Man of the Match Roy Fredericks made 105 and put on 143 with Alvin Kallicharran (53 not out) to take his side to within four of victory.

== Other Matches ==
The West Indies side played 14 first-class matches outside the Tests. They beat Hampshire, Nottinghamshire, Glamorgan, and Derbyshire. Their only defeat was in a match with Derrick Robins' XI which included England batsmen Boycott and Amiss, Clive Rice, Bishen Bedi, Mushtaq Mohammad and Intikhab Alam. The other nine matches were drawn.

Four other non first-class matches were played, three of them one-day matches.

== Tour statistics ==
The Test match batting averages were headed by Gary Sobers with 306 runs at an average of 76.50. Clive Lloyd top scored with 318 runs in the three matches. Keith Boyce was the most successful Test bowler with 19 wickets at 15.47 each.

On the tour as a whole, behind Sobers (who only played in Tests), the top batsman was Maurice Foster, whose 828 runs came at an average of 63.69. Clive Lloyd and Roy Fredericks both scored more than 1000 runs. Boyce was the most successful of the regular bowlers in terms of both aggregate (41 wickets) and average (22.46).
