= 1975 Cricket World Cup final =

1975 cricket match

1975 ICC Cricket World Cup Final
- Event: 1975 ICC Cricket World Cup
West Indies	Australia
(Cricket West Indies)	(Australia)
291/8	274
60 overs	58.4 overs
- West Indies won by 17 runs
- Date: 21 June 1975
- Venue: Lord's Cricket Ground, London
- Player of the match: Clive Lloyd (WI)
- Umpires: Dickie Bird (Eng) and Tom Spencer (Eng)
- Attendance: 26,765

The 1975 Cricket World Cup Final was a One Day International cricket match played at Lord's, London, on 21 June 1975 to determine the winner of the 1975 Cricket World Cup. It was the second time that the West Indies and Australia had met in the tournament, after playing against each other in the group stage. The West Indies won the match by 17 runs to claim their first title.

== Road to the final ==
=== West Indies ===
West Indies qualified for the knockouts with a first-place finish in Group B. The team won all three of their matches against Australia, Pakistan and Sri Lanka. Then in the semi-final against New Zealand, the opposition opened brilliantly, but when Glenn Turner fell, the wickets tumbled the West Indies scored the required 158 to reach the final.

=== Australia ===
Australia made it through to the knockouts in second place with their only loss being against the West Indies. But they did defeat Pakistan and Sri Lanka to take on England in the semi-final. Gary Gilmour took six wickets in the English innings to help them through to the final.

== Final ==
=== Summary ===
The first final was played on 21 June (Midsummer of that year), a sunny day, in front of a capacity crowd of 26,765. Australia won the toss and invited the West Indies to bat, hoping to make use of ideal bowling conditions. The first moment of drama came when opener Roy Fredericks was dismissed hit wicket; he hooked a bouncer from Dennis Lillee for six, but in his follow-through lost his balance and knocked the bails off the stumps. Australia were on top at 50/3 when West Indian captain Clive Lloyd came to the crease in partnership with veteran Rohan Kanhai. The pair swung the match in the West Indies' favour by putting on 149 for the fourth wicket. Kanhai played the anchor role – not scoring for 11 overs – while Lloyd took on the Australian bowling attack, surviving a dropped catch on 26 to score a century off 82 balls with 12 fours and two sixes, being dismissed shortly afterwards for 102. Kanhai, in what would be his farewell from international cricket, scored an invaluable 55. Solid contributions from Keith Boyce and Bernard Julien helped the West Indies close their innings at 291/8. Burly left-arm seamer Gary Gilmour was the pick of the Australian bowlers with 5/48, backing up his strong semi-final performance.

The Australian run chase began steadily: at the 20-over mark, they were 80/1 with Alan Turner and captain Ian Chappell taking advantage of an easy pitch and fast outfield. Then Viv Richards, who had failed with the bat, left his mark on the match with the next three run-outs. First he swooped in and dismissed Turner with a direct hit from close range, then Greg Chappell was also out with a direct hit after a slight misfield. Doug Walters came in and helped his captain steady the ship. Australia were at 162/3 with 21 overs remaining when Chappell, facing his opposing captain, pushed a ball to the left of mid-wicket and started off for a run. He hesitated initially when he saw Richards approaching but started off again after Richards fumbled the ball, only to be caught short of the crease by Richards' lightning recovery and return to Lloyd at the bowler's end. In each situation, the batsmen probably would have made the run had they not hesitated. When Lillee joined Jeff Thomson as last man in, Australia required 59 runs to win off seven overs. The duo kept the game alive, putting on an unlikely last-wicket stand. With three overs remaining Lillee hit a no-ball to Fredericks at extra cover off Vanburn Holder and the crowd rushed on to the field oblivious to the umpire's call. Amid the chaos, Fredericks attempted a run-out but missed and the ball disappeared into the crowd. Lillee and Thomson kept running between the wickets until the crowd was dispersed. When play was resumed, the umpires decided to give Australia two runs. After protest from Thomson, they awarded three runs.

The match finally ended three balls later after Thomson had run a leg bye and Lillee scored a single. The final wicket fell with Thomson swinging wildly and missing. Having not realised the wicket-keeper had held the ball Thomson set off for a run, attempted to return after recognising his mistake but not before Murray knocked the bails off with a well-aimed underarm throw with his gloves on for a run-out. The game ended at 8:43 pm after nearly 10 hours play. Another pitch invasion ensued as the players and umpires ran for safety, with Thomson having his cricket pads stolen, Boyce losing his shoes and umpire Bird having his hat taken. Bird later said that he came across the stolen hat being worn by a bus conductor in London a year after the event. When he asked about it, he was told by the conductor, who did not recognise Bird, that he'd "won the race" by sprinting onto the field at the final to take it.

=== Match details ===
21 June 1975
Scorecard

West Indies; 291/8 (60 overs)	v	Australia; 274 (58.4 overs)
Clive Lloyd 102 (85); Gary Gilmour 5/48 (12 overs)		Ian Chappell 62 (93); Keith Boyce 4/50 (12 overs)

West Indies won by 17 runs
Lord's, London. England
Attendance : 26,765
Umpires: Dickie Bird (Eng) and Tom Spencer (Eng)
Player of the match: Clive Lloyd (WI)

- Australia won the toss and elected to field.
- Rohan Kanhai played his final international match.

== Scorecard ==
West Indies batting
Player	Status	Runs	Balls	4s	6s	Strike rate
Roy Fredericks	hit wicket b Lillee	7	13	0	0	53.84
Gordon Greenidge	c †Marsh b Thomson	13	61	1	0	21.31
Alvin Kallicharran	c †Marsh b Gilmour	12	18	2	0	66.66
Rohan Kanhai	b Gilmour	55	105	8	0	52.38
Clive Lloyd*	c †Marsh b Gilmour	102	85	12	2	120.00
Viv Richards	b Gilmour	5	11	1	0	45.45
Keith Boyce	c GS Chappell b Thomson	34	37	3	0	91.89
Bernard Julien	not out	26	37	1	0	50.27
Deryck Murray†	c & b Gilmour	14	10	1	1	140.00
Vanburn Holder	not out	6	2	1	0	300.00
Andy Roberts	did not bat					
Extras	(lb 6, nb 11)	17				
Total	(8 wickets; 60 overs)	291				

Fall of wickets: 1-12 (Fredericks), 2-27 (Kallicharran), 3-50 (Greenidge), 4-199 (Lloyd), 5-206 (Kanhai), 6-209 (Richards), 7-261 (Boyce), 8-285 (Murray)

Australia bowling
Bowler	Overs	Maidens	Runs	Wickets	Econ	Wides	NBs
Dennis Lillee	12	1	55	1	4.58	0	0
Gary Gilmour	12	2	48	5	4.00	0	0
Jeff Thomson	12	1	44	2	3.66	0	0
Max Walker	12	1	71	0	5.91	0	0
Greg Chappell	7	0	33	0	4.71	0	0
Doug Walters	5	0	23	0	4.60	0	0

Australia batting
Player	Status	Runs	Balls	4s	6s	Strike rate
Alan Turner	run out (Richards)	40	54	4	0	74.07
Rick McCosker	c Kallicharran b Boyce	7	24	1	0	29.16
Ian Chappell*	run out (Richards/Lloyd)	62	93	6	0	66.66
Greg Chappell	run out (Richards)	15	23	2	0	65.21
Doug Walters	b Lloyd	35	51	5	0	68.62
Rod Marsh†	b Boyce	11	24	0	0	45.83
Ross Edwards	b Boyce	28	37	2	0	75.67
Gary Gilmour	c Kanhai b Boyce	14	11	2	0	127.27
Max Walker	run out (Holder)	7	9	1	0	77.77
Jeff Thomson	run out (†Murray)	21	21	2	0	100.00
Dennis Lillee	not out	16	19	1	0	84.21
Extras	(b 2, lb 9, nb 7)	18				
Total	(10 wickets; 58.4 overs)	274				

Fall of wickets: 1-25 (McCosker), 2-81 (Turner), 3-115 (GS Chappell), 4-162 (IM Chappell), 5-170 (Walters), 6-195 (Marsh), 7-221 (Gilmour), 8-231 (Edwards), 9-233 (Walker), 10-274 (Thomson)

West Indies bowling
Bowler	Overs	Maidens	Runs	Wickets	Econ	Wides	NBs
Bernard Julien	12	0	58	0	4.83	0	0
Andy Roberts	11	1	45	0	4.09	0	0
Keith Boyce	12	0	50	4	4.16	0	0
Vanburn Holder	11.4	1	65	0	5.57	0	0
Clive Lloyd	12	1	38	1	3.16	0	0

== See also ==
- ICC Cricket World Cup
