= ICC Men's Player Rankings =

International cricket player rankings

The International Cricket Council player rankings is a widely followed system of rankings for international cricketers based on their recent performances.

The ratings were developed at the suggestion of Ted Dexter in 1987. The intention was to produce a better indication of players' current standing in the sport than is provided by comparing their averages. Career averages are based on a player's entire career and do not make any allowance for match conditions or the strength of the opposition, whereas the ratings are weighted towards recent form and account for match conditions and the quality of the opponent using statistical algorithms.

Initially the rankings were for Test cricket only, but separate One Day International rankings were introduced in 1998. Both sets of rankings have now been calculated back to the start of those forms of the game. The rankings include the top 10 Test, ODI and T20I batsmen, bowlers and all-rounders based on the rating of each player.

== Rankings calculations ==
The player rankings are a weighted average of all a player's performances, with recent matches weighted most heavily (so the overall effect of a good or bad performance decline over time). Each match performance is given a rating out of 1000, based on a set of pre-determined criteria, and these figures averaged. This means that the maximum possible overall rating is 1000, and a player gaining a rating of 900 is seen as an exceptional achievement. Separate lists are maintained for batting and bowling and an all-rounder rating is also published, which is obtained by multiplying a player's batting and bowling rating together and dividing by 1000.

For batting, the performance rating is based on a combination of runs scored, the rating of the opposition bowlers, match result and comparison to the overall scores in the match. A bowler gains points based on wickets taken, runs conceded and match result, with more points gained for dismissing highly rated batsmen. A damping-factor is applied to a player's rating at the start of their career, so they do not get a full rating for their performances until they have played about 20 Tests.

== Test rankings ==
=== Top 10 Test batsmen ===
ICC Top 10 Test Batsmen
| Rank | Name | Rating |
|---|---|---|
| 1 | (England) Harry Brook | 861 |
| 2 | (England) Joe Root | 816 |
| 3 | (Australia) Travis Head | 799 |
| 4 | (South Africa) Temba Bavuma | 793 |
| 5 | (Australia) Steven Smith | 790 |
| 6 | (New Zealand) Rachin Ravindra | 740 |
| 7 | (Afghanistan) Rahmat Shah | 735 |
| 8 | (India) Rishabh Pant | 713 |
| 9 | (New Zealand) Daryl Mitchell | 710 |
| 10 | (India) Shubman Gill | 709 |
Reference: ICC Rankings, 10 November 2026

=== Top 10 Test bowlers ===
ICC Top 10 Test Bowlers
| Rank | Name | Rating |
|---|---|---|
| 1 | (Australia) Mitchell Starc | 881 |
| 2 | (South Africa) Marco Jansen | 875 |
| 3 | (New Zealand) Matt Henry | 861 |
| 4 | (England) Ollie Robinson | 856 |
| 5 | (India) Jasprit Bumrah | 853 |
| 6 | (Australia) Scott Boland | 821 |
| 7 | (South Africa) Simon Harmer | 817 |
| 8 | (South Africa) Kagiso Rabada | 801 |
| 9 | (Australia) Pat Cummins | 789 |
| 10 | (Australia) Josh Hazlewood | 785 |
Reference: ICC Rankings, 10 November 2026

=== Top 10 Test all-rounders ===
ICC Top 10 Test All-Rounders
| Rank | Name | Rating |
|---|---|---|
| 1 | (South Africa) Marco Jansen | 463 |
| 2 | (India) Ravindra Jadeja | 422 |
| 3 | (South Africa) Wiaan Mulder | 320 |
| 4 | (Bangladesh) Mehidy Hasan Miraz | 292 |
| 5 | (South Africa) Simon Harmer | 263 |
| 6 | (Australia) Mitchell Starc | 251 |
| 7 | (India) Washington Sundar | 234 |
| 8 | (Australia) Pat Cummins | 229 |
| 8 | (Cricket West Indies) Justin Greaves | 229 |
| 10 | (England) Gus Atkinson | 219 |
Reference: ICC Rankings, 10 November 2026

== ODI rankings ==
=== Top 10 ODI batsmen ===
ICC Top 10 ODI Batsmen
| Rank | Name | Rating |
|---|---|---|
| 1 | (India) Shubman Gill | 822 |
| 2 | (New Zealand) Daryl Mitchell | 794 |
| 3 | (India) Virat Kohli | 781 |
| 4 | (India) Rohit Sharma | 754 |
| 5 | (Afghanistan) Ibrahim Zadran | 752 |
| 6 | (England) Ben Duckett | 733 |
| 7 | (Cricket West Indies) Shai Hope | 710 |
| 8 | (England) Harry Brook | 674 |
| 9 | (Pakistan) Babar Azam | 661 |
| 10 | (India) KL Rahul | 657 |
Reference: ICC Rankings, 10 November 2026

=== Top 10 ODI bowlers ===
ICC Top 10 ODI Bowlers
| Rank | Name | Rating |
|---|---|---|
| 1 | (Afghanistan) Rashid Khan | 760 |
| 2 | (South Africa) Keshav Maharaj | 660 |
| 3 | (Pakistan) Abrar Ahmed | 642 |
| 4 | (New Zealand) Mitchell Santner | 621 |
| 4 | (Pakistan) Shaheen Shah Afridi | 621 |
| 6 | (Afghanistan) Azmatullah Omarzai | 610 |
| 7 | (India) Kuldeep Yadav | 602 |
| 8 | (Bangladesh) Mehidy Hasan Miraz | 597 |
| 9 | (Bangladesh) Taskin Ahmed | 595 |
| 9 | (Sri Lanka) Maheesh Theekshana | 595 |
Reference: ICC Rankings, 10 November 2026

=== Top 10 ODI all-rounders ===
ICC Top 10 ODI All-Rounders
| Rank | Name | Rating |
|---|---|---|
| 1 | (Afghanistan) Azmatullah Omarzai | 359 |
| 2 | (Zimbabwe) Sikandar Raza | 288 |
| 3 | (Afghanistan) Mohammad Nabi | 251 |
| 4 | (Bangladesh) Mehidy Hasan Miraz | 250 |
| 5 | (Afghanistan) Rashid Khan | 245 |
| 6 | (New Zealand) Mitchell Santner | 241 |
| 7 | (Scotland) Brandon McMullen | 238 |
| 8 | (New Zealand) Michael Bracewell | 236 |
| 9 | (India) Axar Patel | 206 |
| 10 | (Ireland) Curtis Campher | 195 |
| 10 | (Cricket West Indies) Gudakesh Motie | 195 |
Reference: ICC Rankings, 10 November 2026

== T20I rankings ==
=== Top 10 T20I batsmen ===
ICC Top 10 T20I Batsmen
| Rank | Name | Rating |
|---|---|---|
| 1 | (India) Abhishek Sharma | 889 |
| 2 | (Pakistan) Sahibzada Farhan | 883 |
| 3 | (India) Ishan Kishan | 862 |
| 4 | (England) Harry Brook | 793 |
| 5 | (England) Jos Buttler | 789 |
| 5 | (South Africa) Dewald Brevis | 789 |
| 7 | (India) Shreyas Iyer | 777 |
| 8 | (England) Phil Salt | 775 |
| 9 | (Cricket West Indies) Shai Hope | 759 |
| 10 | (Sri Lanka) Pathum Nissanka | 720 |
Reference: ICC Rankings, 3 November 2026

=== Top 10 T20I bowlers ===
ICC Top 10 T20I Bowlers
| Rank | Name | Rating |
|---|---|---|
| 1 | (Afghanistan) Rashid Khan | 731 |
| 2 | (Australia) Adam Zampa | 700 |
| 3 | (England) Adil Rashid | 695 |
| 3 | (Pakistan) Abrar Ahmed | 695 |
| 5 | (New Zealand) Mitchell Santner | 676 |
| 6 | (Australia) Nathan Ellis | 675 |
| 7 | (England) Jamie Overton | 674 |
| 8 | (Bangladesh) Nasum Ahmed | 661 |
| 9 | (Bangladesh) Mahedi Hasan | 654 |
| 10 | (England) Liam Dawson | 648 |
Reference: ICC Rankings, 3 November 2026

=== Top 10 T20I all-rounders ===
ICC Top 10 T20I All-Rounders
| Rank | Name | Rating |
|---|---|---|
| 1 | (Zimbabwe) Sikandar Raza | 331 |
| 2 | (Pakistan) Saim Ayub | 290 |
| 3 | (Afghanistan) Azmatullah Omarzai | 279 |
| 4 | (Cricket West Indies) Roston Chase | 258 |
| 5 | (England) Will Jacks | 257 |
| 6 | (Nepal) Dipendra Singh Airee | 255 |
| 7 | (Namibia) Gerhard Erasmus | 213 |
| 8 | (Afghanistan) Rashid Khan | 201 |
| 9 | (New Zealand) Mitchell Santner | 200 |
| 10 | (England) Sam Curran | 190 |
Reference: ICC Rankings, 3 November 2026

== Historical rankings ==
=== Historical Test cricket rankings ===
==== Year end top ranked players in Test cricket ====
| Year | Top Batsman | Country | Rating | Top Bowler | Country | Rating | Top All-rounder | Country | Rating |
|---|---|---|---|---|---|---|---|---|---|
| 2025 | Joe Root (2) | England | 867 | Jasprit Bumrah (2) | India | 879 | Ravindra Jadeja (4) | India | 455 |
| 2024 | Joe Root | England | 895 | Jasprit Bumrah | India | 907 | Ravindra Jadeja (3) | India | 405 |
| 2023 | Kane Williamson (2) | New Zealand | 864 | Ravichandran Ashwin (3) | India | 879 | Ravindra Jadeja (2) | India | 455 |
| 2022 | Marnus Labuschagne (2) | Australia | 925 | Pat Cummins (4) | Australia | 872 | Ravindra Jadeja | India | 369 |
| 2021 | Marnus Labuschagne | Australia | 915 | Pat Cummins (3) | Australia | 902 | Jason Holder (2) | West Indies | 382 |
| 2020 | Kane Williamson | New Zealand | 890 | Pat Cummins (2) | Australia | 906 | Ben Stokes | England | 446 |
| 2019 | Virat Kohli (2) | India | 928 | Pat Cummins | Australia | 902 | Jason Holder | West Indies | 473 |
| 2018 | Virat Kohli | India | 931 | Kagiso Rabada | South Africa | 880 | Shakib Al Hasan (3) | Bangladesh | 415 |
| 2017 | Steve Smith (3) | Australia | 947 | James Anderson | England | 892 | Shakib Al Hasan (2) | Bangladesh | 437 |
| 2016 | Steve Smith (2) | Australia | 937 | Ravichandran Ashwin (2) | India | 887 | Ravichandran Ashwin (3) | India | 481 |
| 2015 | Steve Smith | Australia | 899 | Ravichandran Ashwin | India | 871 | Ravichandran Ashwin (2) | India | 405 |
| 2014 | AB de Villiers (2) | South Africa | 893 | Dale Steyn (5) | South Africa | 906 | Shakib Al Hasan | Bangladesh | 398 |
| 2013 | AB de Villiers | South Africa | 912 | Vernon Philander | South Africa | 909 | Ravichandran Ashwin | India | 387 |
| 2012 | Michael Clarke | Australia | 900 | Dale Steyn (4) | South Africa | 880 | Jacques Kallis (11) | South Africa | 387 |
| 2011 | Kumar Sangakkara (3) | Sri Lanka | 863 | Dale Steyn (3) | South Africa | 898 | Shakib Al Hasan | Bangladesh | 404 |
| 2010 | Kumar Sangakkara (2) | Sri Lanka | 882 | Dale Steyn (2) | South Africa | 897 | Jacques Kallis (10) | South Africa | 429 |
| 2009 | Gautam Gambhir | India | 877 | Dale Steyn | South Africa | 836 | Jacques Kallis (9) | South Africa | 452 |
| 2008 | Shivnarine Chanderpaul | West Indies | 901 | Muttiah Muralitharan (4) | Sri Lanka | 897 | Jacques Kallis (8) | South Africa | 447 |
| 2007 | Kumar Sangakkara | Sri Lanka | 933 | Muttiah Muralitharan (3) | Sri Lanka | 907 | Jacques Kallis (7) | South Africa | 537 |
| 2006 | Ricky Ponting (3) | Australia | 937 | Muttiah Muralitharan (2) | Sri Lanka | 913 | Jacques Kallis (6) | South Africa | 439 |
| 2005 | Ricky Ponting (2) | Australia | 886 | Shane Warne (3) | Australia | 867 | Jacques Kallis (5) | South Africa | 476 |
| 2004 | Rahul Dravid | India | 881 | Glenn McGrath (5) | Australia | 870 | Jacques Kallis (4) | South Africa | 500 |
| 2003 | Ricky Ponting | Australia | 905 | Muttiah Muralitharan | Sri Lanka | 908 | Jacques Kallis (3) | South Africa | 518 |
| 2002 | Matthew Hayden | Australia | 906 | Glenn McGrath (4) | Australia | 911 | Jacques Kallis (2) | South Africa | 615 |
| 2001 | Brian Lara (3) | West Indies | 905 | Glenn McGrath (3) | Australia | 902 | Jacques Kallis | South Africa | 503 |
| 2000 | Sachin Tendulkar (3) | India | 877 | Shaun Pollock (2) | South Africa | 901 | Chris Cairns | New Zealand | 461 |
| 1999 | Brian Lara (2) | West Indies | 892 | Shaun Pollock | South Africa | 904 | Shaun Pollock (2) | South Africa | 464 |
| 1998 | Sachin Tendulkar (2) | India | 861 | Allan Donald | South Africa | 871 | Shaun Pollock | South Africa | 453 |
| 1997 | Steve Waugh (2) | Australia | 828 | Glenn McGrath (2) | Australia | 853 | Brian McMillan (3) | South Africa | 356 |
| 1996 | Steve Waugh | Australia | 894 | Glenn McGrath | Australia | 872 | Brian McMillan (2) | South Africa | 389 |
| 1995 | Brian Lara | West Indies | 898 | Shane Warne (2) | Australia | 876 | Brian McMillan | South Africa | 386 |
| 1994 | Sachin Tendulkar | India | 776 | Shane Warne | Australia | 905 | Wasim Akram | Pakistan | 274 |
| 1993 | Graham Gooch (3) | England | 821 | Waqar Younis | Pakistan | 907 | Kapil Dev (2) | India | 323 |
| 1992 | Graham Gooch (2) | England | 852 | Curtly Ambrose (2) | West Indies | 868 | Kapil Dev | India | 331 |
| 1991 | Graham Gooch | England | 871 | Curtly Ambrose | West Indies | 834 | Imran Khan (4) | Pakistan | 475 |
| 1990 | Richie Richardson (2) | West Indies | 789 | Malcolm Marshall (3) | West Indies | 845 | Imran Khan (3) | Pakistan | 466 |
| 1989 | Richie Richardson | West Indies | 876 | Malcolm Marshall (2) | West Indies | 897 | Imran Khan (2) | Pakistan | 442 |
| 1988 | Javed Miandad | Pakistan | 808 | Richard Hadlee (4) | New Zealand | 900 | Richard Hadlee (5) | New Zealand | 425 |
| 1987 | Dilip Vengsarkar | India | 833 | Richard Hadlee (3) | New Zealand | 905 | Richard Hadlee (4) | New Zealand | 457 |
| 1986 | Viv Richards (6) | West Indies | 829 | Richard Hadlee (2) | New Zealand | 903 | Richard Hadlee (3) | New Zealand | 440 |
| 1985 | Allan Border | Australia | 817 | Richard Hadlee | New Zealand | 909 | Richard Hadlee (2) | New Zealand | 446 |
| 1984 | Clive Lloyd (2) | West Indies | 783 | Malcolm Marshall | West Indies | 897 | Richard Hadlee | New Zealand | 443 |
| 1983 | Clive Lloyd | West Indies | 806 | Imran Khan (2) | Pakistan | 856 | Imran Khan | Pakistan | 487 |
| 1982 | Viv Richards (5) | West Indies | 892 | Imran Khan | Pakistan | 909 | Ian Botham (5) | England | 491 |
| 1981 | Viv Richards (4) | West Indies | 908 | Dennis Lillee (3) | Australia | 866 | Ian Botham (4) | England | 528 |
| 1980 | Viv Richards (3) | West Indies | 903 | Ian Botham (2) | England | 888 | Ian Botham (3) | England | 546 |
| 1979 | Sunil Gavaskar (2) | India | 875 | Ian Botham | England | 897 | Ian Botham (2) | England | 534 |
| 1978 | Sunil Gavaskar | India | 833 | Bob Willis | England | 837 | Ian Botham | England | 399 |
| 1977 | Viv Richards (2) | West Indies | 872 | Dennis Lillee (2) | Australia | 824 | Mushtaq Mohammad | Pakistan | 351 |
| 1976 | Viv Richards | West Indies | 913 | Andy Roberts | West Indies | 850 | Tony Greig (3) | England | 412 |
| 1975 | Alvin Kallicharran | West Indies | 842 | Dennis Lillee | Australia | 849 | Tony Greig (2) | England | 485 |
| 1974 | Glenn Turner | New Zealand | 845 | Derek Underwood (5) | England | 712 | Tony Greig | England | 471 |
| 1973 | Garry Sobers (12) | West Indies | 789 | Geoff Arnold; Bishen Bedi | England; India | 721 | Garry Sobers (12) | West Indies | 489 |
| 1972 | Garry Sobers (11) | West Indies | 776 | Derek Underwood (4) | England | 884 | Garry Sobers (11) | West Indies | 506 |
| 1971 | Garry Sobers (10) | West Indies | 834 | Derek Underwood (3) | England | 843 | Garry Sobers (10) | West Indies | 538 |
| 1970 | Doug Walters (2) | Australia | 865 | Derek Underwood (2) | England | 845 | Garry Sobers (9) | West Indies | 504 |
| 1969 | Doug Walters (1) | Australia | 896 | Derek Underwood | England | 849 | Garry Sobers (8) | West Indies | 504 |
| 1968 | Garry Sobers (9) | West Indies | 918 | Lance Gibbs (5) | West Indies | 845 | Garry Sobers (7) | West Indies | 655 |
| 1967 | Garry Sobers (8) | West Indies | 938 | Lance Gibbs (4) | West Indies | 866 | Garry Sobers (6) | West Indies | 647 |
| 1966 | Garry Sobers (7) | West Indies | 935 | Lance Gibbs (3) | West Indies | 843 | Garry Sobers (5) | West Indies | 644 |
| 1965 | Ken Barrington | England | 873 | Lance Gibbs (2) | West Indies | 863 | Garry Sobers (4) | West Indies | 529 |
| 1964 | Garry Sobers (6) | West Indies | 894 | Lance Gibbs | West Indies | 878 | Garry Sobers (3) | West Indies | 604 |
| 1963 | Garry Sobers (5) | West Indies | 894 | Fred Trueman | England | 880 | Garry Sobers (2) | West Indies | 604 |
| 1962 | Garry Sobers (4) | West Indies | 907 | Wes Hall | West Indies | 898 | Garry Sobers | West Indies | 556 |
| 1961 | Garry Sobers (3) | West Indies | 896 | Alan Davidson (2) | Australia | 899 | Alan Davidson (2) | Australia | 437 |
| 1960 | Garry Sobers (2) | West Indies | 933 | Alan Davidson | Australia | 896 | Alan Davidson | Australia | 468 |
| 1959 | Garry Sobers | West Indies | 881 | Fazal Mahmood | Pakistan | 874 | Richie Benaud (2) | Australia | 473 |
| 1958 | Peter May (3) | England | 894 | Tony Lock | England | 908 | Richie Benaud | Australia | 503 |
| 1957 | Peter May (2) | England | 905 | Hugh Tayfield (2) | South Africa | 856 | Trevor Bailey | England | 382 |
| 1956 | Peter May | England | 937 | Jim Laker | England | 896 | Vinoo Mankad | India | 337 |
| 1955 | Clyde Walcott | West Indies | 938 | Hugh Tayfield | South Africa | 817 | Keith Miller (8) | Australia | 513 |
| 1954 | Neil Harvey | Australia | 916 | Ray Lindwall (3) | Australia | 892 | Keith Miller (7) | Australia | 465 |
| 1953 | Len Hutton (5) | England | 926 | Alec Bedser | England | 897 | Keith Miller (6) | Australia | 464 |
| 1952 | Len Hutton (4) | England | 917 | Bill Johnston (3) | Australia | 862 | Keith Miller (5) | Australia | 548 |
| 1951 | Len Hutton (3) | England | 916 | Bill Johnston (2) | Australia | 899 | Keith Miller (4) | Australia | 481 |
| 1950 | Len Hutton (2) | England | 903 | Bill Johnston | Australia | 869 | Keith Miller (3) | Australia | 349 |
| 1949 | Len Hutton | England | 853 | Ray Lindwall (2) | Australia | 822 | Keith Miller (2) | Australia | 303 |
| 1948 | Denis Compton | England | 903 | Ray Lindwall | Australia | 830 | Keith Miller | Australia | 277 |
| 1947 | Don Bradman (10) | Australia | 950 | Ernie Toshack | Australia | 595 | Bill Edrich | England | 269 |
| 1946 | Don Bradman (9) | Australia | 953 | Bill Voce | England | 545 | Wally Hammond (8) | England | 271 |
| 1945 | No Test cricket took place (due to World War II) | | | | | | | | |
| 1944 | No Test cricket took place (due to World War II) | | | | | | | | |
| 1943 | No Test cricket took place (due to World War II) | | | | | | | | |
| 1942 | No Test cricket took place (due to World War II) | | | | | | | | |
| 1941 | No Test cricket took place (due to World War II) | | | | | | | | |
| 1940 | No Test cricket took place (due to World War II) | | | | | | | | |
| 1939 | Don Bradman (8) | Australia | 952 | Bill O'Reilly (3) | Australia | 887 | Wally Hammond (7) | England | 334 |
| 1938 | Don Bradman (7) | Australia | 952 | Bill O'Reilly | Australia | 887 | Wally Hammond (6) | England | 346 |
| 1937 | Don Bradman (6) | Australia | 948 | Bill O'Reilly | Australia | 897 | Wally Hammond (5) | England | 370 |
| 1936 | Don Bradman (5) | Australia | 885 | Hedley Verity | England | 839 | Wally Hammond (4) | England | 341 |
| 1935 | Don Bradman (4) | Australia | 941 | Clarrie Grimmett (6) | Australia | 830 | Wally Hammond (3) | England | 286 |
| 1934 | Don Bradman (3) | Australia | 960 | Clarrie Grimmett (5) | Australia | 826 | Hedley Verity | England | 298 |
| 1933 | Don Bradman (2) | Australia | 909 | Clarrie Grimmett (4) | Australia | 783 | Wally Hammond (2) | England | 326 |
| 1932 | Herbert Sutcliffe (4) | England | 873 | Clarrie Grimmett (3) | Australia | 841 | Wally Hammond | England | 305 |
| 1931 | Don Bradman | Australia | 847 | Clarrie Grimmett (2) | Australia | 801 | Maurice Tate (4) | England | 259 |
| 1930 | Herbert Sutcliffe (3) | England | 844 | Clarrie Grimmett | Australia | 757 | Maurice Tate (3) | England | 232 |
| 1929 | Herbert Sutcliffe (2) | England | 852 | Maurice Tate (5) | England | 739 | Maurice Tate (2) | England | 274 |
| 1928 | Herbert Sutcliffe | England | 857 | Maurice Tate (4) | England | 851 | Maurice Tate | England | 257 |
| 1927 | Jack Hobbs (11) | England | 889 | Maurice Tate (3) | England | 848 | Jack Gregory (7) | Australia | 324 |
| 1926 | Jack Hobbs (10) | England | 898 | Maurice Tate (2) | England | 857 | Jack Gregory (6) | Australia | 324 |
| 1925 | Jack Hobbs (9) | England | 859 | Maurice Tate | England | 838 | Jack Gregory (5) | Australia | 377 |
| 1924 | Jack Hobbs (8) | England | 872 | Jack Gregory (4) | Australia | 734 | Jack Gregory (4) | Australia | 364 |
| 1923 | Herbie Taylor | South Africa | 844 | Jack Gregory (3) | Australia | 706 | Jack Gregory (3) | Australia | 379 |
| 1922 | Jack Hobbs (7) | England | 868 | Jack Gregory (2) | Australia | 706 | Jack Gregory (2) | Australia | 379 |
| 1921 | Jack Hobbs (6) | England | 877 | Jack Gregory | Australia | 706 | Jack Gregory | Australia | 379 |
| 1920 | Jack Hobbs (5) | England | 938 | Aubrey Faulkner (2) | South Africa | 578 | Aubrey Faulkner (6) | South Africa | 398 |
| 1919 | No Test cricket took place (due to World War I) | | | | | | | | |
| 1918 | No Test cricket took place (due to World War I) | | | | | | | | |
| 1917 | No Test cricket took place (due to World War I) | | | | | | | | |
| 1916 | No Test cricket took place (due to World War I) | | | | | | | | |
| 1915 | No Test cricket took place (due to World War I) | | | | | | | | |
| 1914 | Jack Hobbs (4) | England | 940 | Aubrey Faulkner | South Africa | 578 | Aubrey Faulkner (5) | South Africa | 398 |
| 1913 | Jack Hobbs (3) | England | 939 | Sydney Barnes (3) | England | 930 | Aubrey Faulkner (4) | South Africa | 423 |
| 1912 | Jack Hobbs (2) | England | 942 | Sydney Barnes (2) | England | 917 | Aubrey Faulkner (3) | South Africa | 440 |
| 1911 | Aubrey Faulkner | South Africa | 853 | Sydney Barnes | England | 688 | Aubrey Faulkner (2) | South Africa | 486 |
| 1910 | Jack Hobbs | England | 774 | Tibby Cotter | Australia | 709 | Aubrey Faulkner | South Africa | 373 |
| 1909 | Clem Hill (7) | Australia | 649 | Colin Blythe (2) | England | 793 | Monty Noble (7) | Australia | 342 |
| 1908 | Clem Hill (6) | Australia | 682 | Jack Saunders | Australia | 734 | Monty Noble (6) | Australia | 373 |
| 1907 | Clem Hill (5) | Australia | 706 | Colin Blythe | England | 755 | Monty Noble (5) | Australia | 341 |
| 1906 | Clem Hill (4) | Australia | 696 | Wilfred Rhodes (2) | England | 726 | Monty Noble (4) | Australia | 337 |
| 1905 | Stanley Jackson | England | 749 | Wilfred Rhodes | England | 763 | Monty Noble (3) | Australia | 337 |
| 1904 | Clem Hill (3) | Australia | 799 | Hugh Trumble (6) | Australia | 860 | Monty Noble (2) | Australia | 450 |
| 1903 | Clem Hill (2) | Australia | 862 | Hugh Trumble (5) | Australia | 822 | Monty Noble | Australia | 333 |
| 1902 | Clem Hill | Australia | 886 | Hugh Trumble (4) | Australia | 830 | Hugh Trumble (4) | Australia | 330 |
| 1901 | Tom Hayward (3) | England | 705 | Hugh Trumble (3) | Australia | 652 | Hugh Trumble (3) | Australia | 256 |
| 1900 | Tom Hayward (2) | England | 673 | Hugh Trumble (2) | Australia | 678 | Hugh Trumble (2) | Australia | 260 |
| 1899 | Tom Hayward | England | 673 | Hugh Trumble | Australia | 678 | Hugh Trumble | Australia | 260 |
| 1898 | Joe Darling | Australia | 753 | Tom Richardson | England | 763 | Johnny Briggs (5) | England | 222 |
| 1897 | WG Grace (6) | England | 607 | Johnny Briggs (6) | England | 794 | Johnny Briggs (4) | England | 231 |
| 1896 | Jack Lyons (4) | Australia | 618 | Bobby Peel (4) | England | 827 | George Giffen (2) | Australia | 372 |
| 1895 | WG Grace (5) | England | 646 | Johnny Briggs (5) | England | 870 | George Giffen | Australia | 414 |
| 1894 | Jack Lyons (3) | Australia | 699 | Johnny Briggs (3) | England | 883 | Johnny Briggs (3) | England | 332 |
| 1893 | Jack Lyons (2) | Australia | 732 | Johnny Briggs (2) | England | 886 | Johnny Briggs (2) | England | 290 |
| 1892 | Jack Lyons | Australia | 713 | Johnny Briggs | England | 862 | Johnny Briggs | England | 310 |
| 1891 | WG Grace (4) | England | 653 | Bobby Peel (3) | England | 805 | Billy Barnes (5) | England | 371 |
| 1890 | WG Grace (3) | England | 653 | Bobby Peel (2) | England | 805 | Billy Barnes (4) | England | 371 |
| 1889 | Arthur Shrewsbury (4) | England | 678 | Johnny Briggs | England | 817 | Billy Barnes (3) | England | 376 |
| 1888 | Arthur Shrewsbury (3) | England | 692 | Bobby Peel | England | 774 | Billy Barnes (2) | England | 392 |
| 1887 | Arthur Shrewsbury (2) | England | 677 | Billy Bates | England | 658 | Billy Barnes | England | 318 |
| 1886 | Arthur Shrewsbury | England | 733 | Fred Spofforth (6) | Australia | 827 | Billy Bates (2) | England | 282 |
| 1885 | A. G. Steel (2) | England | 645 | Joey Palmer (2) | Australia | 783 | Billy Bates | England | 300 |
| 1884 | A. G. Steel (1) | England | 671 | Joey Palmer | Australia | 797 | A. G. Steel | England | 253 |
| 1883 | George Ulyett (2) | England | 603 | Fred Spofforth (5) | Australia (5) | 643 | Billy Bates | England | 225 |
| 1882 | George Ulyett | England | 628 | Fred Spofforth (4) | Australia | 557 | George Ulyett | England | 180 |
| 1881 | WG Grace (2) | England | 436 | Fred Spofforth (3) | Australia | 433 | | | |
| 1880 | WG Grace | England | 436 | Fred Spofforth (2) | Australia | 433 | | | |
| 1879 | Charles Bannerman (3) | Australia | 433 | Fred Spofforth | Australia | 437 | | | |
| 1878 | Charles Bannerman (2) | Australia | 466 | Tom Kendall (2) | Australia | 384 | | | |
| 1877 | Charles Bannerman | Australia | 466 | Tom Kendall | Australia | 384 | | | |

==== Batting and Bowling and All-rounders with a peak rating of 900 points or more ====
Top 25 Rankings Batting
| Rank | Name | Played for | Highest rating | Year |
|---|---|---|---|---|
| 1 | Donald Bradman | Australia | 961 | 1948 |
| 2 | Steve Smith | Australia | 947 | 2017 |
| 3 | Sir Len Hutton | England | 945 | 1954 |
| 4 | Sir Jack Hobbs | England | 942 | 1912 |
| 4 | Ricky Ponting | Australia | 942 | 2006 |
| 6 | Peter May | England | 941 | 1956 |
| 7 | Sir Vivian Richards | West Indies | 938 | 1981 |
| 7 | Kumar Sangakkara | Sri Lanka | 938 | 2007 |
| 7 | Sir Garry Sobers | West Indies | 938 | 1967 |
| 7 | Sir Clyde Walcott | West Indies | 938 | 1955 |
| 11 | Virat Kohli | India | 937 | 2018 |
| 11 | Marnus Labuschagne | Australia | 937 | 2022 |
| 13 | Matthew Hayden | Australia | 935 | 2002 |
| 13 | Jacques Kallis | South Africa | 935 | 2007 |
| 13 | AB de Villiers | South Africa | 935 | 2014 |
| 16 | Mohammad Yousuf | Pakistan | 933 | 2006 |
| 17 | Joe Root | England | 932 | 2024 |
| 18 | Sir Everton Weekes | West Indies | 927 | 1956 |
| 18 | Graeme Pollock | South Africa | 927 | 1970 |
| 20 | Dudley Nourse | South Africa | 922 | 1951 |
| 20 | Doug Walters | Australia | 922 | 1970 |
| 22 | Neil Harvey | Australia | 921 | 1953 |
| 22 | Mike Hussey | Australia | 921 | 2008 |
| 24 | Kane Williamson | New Zealand | 919 | 2021 |
| 25 | Denis Compton | England | 917 | 1948 |

Bowlers with a peak rating of 900 points or more
| Rank | Name | Played for | Highest rating | Year |
|---|---|---|---|---|
| 1 | Sydney Barnes | England | 932 | 1914 |
| 2 | George Lohmann | England | 931 | 1896 |
| 3 | Imran Khan | Pakistan | 922 | 1983 |
| 4 | Muttiah Muralitharan | Sri Lanka | 920 | 2007 |
| 5 | Glenn McGrath | Australia | 914 | 2001 |
| 5 | Pat Cummins | Australia | 914 | 2019 |
| 7 | Curtly Ambrose | West Indies | 912 | 1994 |
| 7 | Tony Lock | England | 912 | 1958 |
| 7 | Vernon Philander | South Africa | 912 | 2013 |
| 10 | Sir Ian Botham | England | 911 | 1980 |
| 11 | Malcolm Marshall | West Indies | 910 | 1988 |
| 12 | Waqar Younis | Pakistan | 909 | 1993 |
| 12 | Sir Richard Hadlee | New Zealand | 909 | 1985 |
| 12 | Shaun Pollock | South Africa | 909 | 1999 |
| 12 | Dale Steyn | South Africa | 909 | 2014 |
| 16 | Alan Keith Davidson | Australia | 908 | 1961 |
| 16 | Jasprit Bumrah | India | 908 | 2025 |
| 18 | Derek Underwood | England | 907 | 1971 |
| 19 | Shane Warne | Australia | 905 | 1994 |
| 20 | Ravichandran Ashwin | India | 904 | 2016 |
| 21 | Sir Alec Bedser | England | 903 | 1953 |
| 21 | James Anderson | England | 903 | 2018 |
| 23 | Kagiso Rabada | South Africa | 902 | 2018 |
| 24 | Clarrie Grimmett | Australia | 901 | 1936 |
| 24 | Bill O'Reilly | Australia | 901 | 1946 |
| 26 | Bill Johnston | Australia | 900 | 1952 |

All-rounders with a peak rating of 500 points or more
| Rank | Name | Played for | Highest rating | Year |
|---|---|---|---|---|
| 1 | Sir Garry Sobers | West Indies | 669 | 1967 |
| 2 | Sir Ian Botham | England | 645 | 1980 |
| 3 | Jacques Kallis | South Africa | 615 | 2002 |
| 4 | Keith Miller | Australia | 572 | 1952 |
| 5 | Richard Benaud | Australia | 532 | 1959 |
| 6 | Imran Khan | Pakistan | 517 | 1983 |
| 7 | Tony Greig | England | 508 | 1975 |
| 8 | Andrew Flintoff | England | 501 | 2005 |
| 8 | Aubrey Faulkner | South Africa | 501 | 1911 |
| 10 | Chris Cairns | New Zealand | 500 | 2000 |

=== Historical One Day International (ODI) cricket rankings ===
==== Year end top ranked players in ODI cricket ====
| Year | Top Batsman | Country | Rating | Top Bowler | Country | Rating | Top All-rounder | Country | Rating |
|---|---|---|---|---|---|---|---|---|---|
| 2025 | Rohit Sharma | India | 781 | Rashid Khan (2) | Afghanistan | 710 | Azmatullah Omarzai | Afghanistan | 334 |
| 2024 | Babar Azam (4) | Pakistan | 795 | Rashid Khan | Afghanistan | 669 | Mohammad Nabi | Afghanistan | 300 |
| 2023 | Babar Azam (3) | Pakistan | 824 | Keshav Maharaj | South Africa | 716 | Shakib Al Hasan (11) | Bangladesh | 310 |
| 2022 | Babar Azam (2) | Pakistan | 893 | Trent Boult (4) | New Zealand | 737 | Shakib Al Hasan (10) | Bangladesh | 389 |
| 2021 | Babar Azam | Pakistan | 873 | Trent Boult (3) | New Zealand | 737 | Shakib Al Hasan (9) | Bangladesh | 416 |
| 2020 | Virat Kohli (4) | India | 870 | Trent Boult (2) | New Zealand | 722 | Shakib Al Hasan (8) | Bangladesh | 373 |
| 2019 | Virat Kohli (3) | India | 887 | Jasprit Bumrah (2) | India | 785 | Ben Stokes | England | 319 |
| 2018 | Virat Kohli (2) | India | 909 | Jasprit Bumrah | India | 841 | Rashid Khan | Afghanistan | 353 |
| 2017 | Virat Kohli | India | 876 | Hasan Ali | Pakistan | 759 | Mohammad Hafeez | Pakistan | 352 |
| 2016 | AB de Villiers (4) | South Africa | 861 | Trent Boult | New Zealand | 718 | Shakib Al Hasan (7) | Bangladesh | 377 |
| 2015 | AB de Villiers (3) | South Africa | 900 | Sunil Narine (2) | West Indies | 734 | Shakib Al Hasan (6) | Bangladesh | 415 |
| 2014 | AB de Villiers (2) | South Africa | 887 | Sunil Narine | West Indies | 753 | Angelo Mathews | Sri Lanka | 408 |
| 2013 | AB de Villiers | South Africa | 872 | Saeed Ajmal (3) | Pakistan | 776 | Shakib Al Hasan (5) | Bangladesh | 376 |
| 2012 | Hashim Amla (3) | South Africa | 901 | Saeed Ajmal (2) | Pakistan | 747 | Shakib Al Hasan (4) | Bangladesh | 425 |
| 2011 | Hashim Amla (2) | South Africa | 840 | Saeed Ajmal | Pakistan | 735 | Shakib Al Hasan (3) | Bangladesh | 419 |
| 2010 | Hashim Amla | South Africa | 849 | Daniel Vettori (2) | New Zealand | 727 | Shakib Al Hasan (2) | Bangladesh | 434 |
| 2009 | M.S. Dhoni (2) | India | 825 | Daniel Vettori | New Zealand | 717 | Shakib Al Hasan | Bangladesh | 453 |
| 2008 | M.S. Dhoni | India | 771 | Nathan Bracken | Australia | 754 | Jacob Oram | New Zealand | 381 |
| 2007 | Ricky Ponting (2) | Australia | 829 | Shaun Pollock (7) | South Africa | 843 | Shaun Pollock (2) | South Africa | 466 |
| 2006 | Michael Hussey | Australia | 815 | Shaun Pollock (6) | South Africa | 905 | Shaun Pollock | South Africa | 473 |
| 2005 | Ricky Ponting | Australia | 803 | Glenn McGrath | Australia | 832 | Andrew Flintoff (2) | England | 453 |
| 2004 | Adam Gilchrist | Australia | 789 | Shaun Pollock (5) | South Africa | 822 | Andrew Flintoff | England | 511 |
| 2003 | Sachin Tendulkar (2) | India | 816 | Shaun Pollock (4) | South Africa | 877 | Chris Gayle | West Indies | 509 |
| 2002 | Michael Bevan (4) | Australia | 778 | Shaun Pollock (3) | South Africa | 887 | Jacques Kallis (3) | South Africa | 463 |
| 2001 | Michael Bevan (3) | Australia | 835 | Muttiah Muralitharan (2) | Sri Lanka | 898 | Jacques Kallis (2) | South Africa | 449 |
| 2000 | Michael Bevan (2) | Australia | 855 | Muttiah Muralitharan | Sri Lanka | 856 | Jacques Kallis | South Africa | 449 |
| 1999 | Michael Bevan | Australia | 859 | Shaun Pollock (2) | South Africa | 812 | Lance Klusener | South Africa | 491 |
| 1998 | Sachin Tendulkar | India | 887 | Saqlain Mushtaq | Pakistan | 793 | Carl Hooper (2) | West Indies | 437 |
| 1997 | Brian Lara (5) | West Indies | 883 | Shaun Pollock | South Africa | 800 | Sanath Jayasuriya | Sri Lanka | 434 |
| 1996 | Brian Lara (4) | West Indies | 891 | Curtly Ambrose (4) | West Indies | 827 | Carl Hooper | West Indies | 361 |
| 1995 | Brian Lara (3) | West Indies | 880 | Paul Reiffel | Australia | 787 | Hansie Cronje (2) | South Africa | 464 |
| 1994 | Brian Lara (2) | West Indies | 826 | Wasim Akram (2) | Pakistan | 780 | Hansie Cronje | South Africa | 407 |
| 1993 | Brian Lara | West Indies | 863 | Wasim Akram | Pakistan | 825 | Kapil Dev (11) | India | 398 |
| 1992 | Dean Jones (4) | Australia | 858 | Curtly Ambrose (3) | West Indies | 816 | Kapil Dev (10) | India | 435 |
| 1991 | Dean Jones (3) | Australia | 894 | Curtly Ambrose (2) | West Indies | 870 | Kapil Dev (9) | India | 476 |
| 1990 | Dean Jones (2) | Australia | 913 | Curtly Ambrose | West Indies | 813 | Kapil Dev (8) | India | 442 |
| 1989 | Dean Jones | Australia | 870 | Courtney Walsh | West Indies | 778 | Kapil Dev (7) | India | 475 |
| 1988 | Javed Miandad | Pakistan | 888 | Malcolm Marshall | West Indies | 780 | Kapil Dev (6) | India | 516 |
| 1987 | Vivian Richards (5) | West Indies | 933 | Maninder Singh | India | 814 | Kapil Dev (5) | India | 521 |
| 1986 | Vivian Richards (4) | West Indies | 932 | Joel Garner (3) | West Indies | 891 | Kapil Dev (4) | India | 556 |
| 1985 | Vivian Richards (3) | West Indies | 935 | Joel Garner (2) | West Indies | 921 | Kapil Dev (3) | India | 573 |
| 1984 | Vivian Richards (2) | West Indies | 932 | Joel Garner | West Indies | 918 | Kapil Dev (2) | India | 545 |
| 1983 | Zaheer Abbas | Pakistan | 931 | Richard Hadlee | New Zealand | 914 | Kapil Dev | India | 618 |
| 1982 | Vivian Richards | West Indies | 901 | Dennis Lillee (3) | Australia | 878 | Greg Chappell (5) | Australia | 523 |
| 1981 | Greg Chappell (5) | Australia | 884 | Dennis Lillee (2) | Australia | 814 | Greg Chappell (4) | Australia | 547 |
| 1980 | Greg Chappell (4) | Australia | 817 | Dennis Lillee | Australia | 764 | Greg Chappell (3) | Australia | 371 |
| 1979 | Greg Chappell (3) | Australia | 733 | Andy Roberts | West Indies | 646 | Chris Old (4) | England | 251 |
| 1978 | Greg Chappell (2) | Australia | 670 | Chris Old | England | 560 | Chris Old (3) | England | 245 |
| 1977 | Greg Chappell | Australia | 677 | Max Walker (2) | Australia | 517 | Greg Chappell (2) | Australia | 222 |
| 1976 | Dennis Amiss (2) | England | 654 | Bernard Julien | West Indies | 540 | Chris Old (2) | England | 165 |
| 1975 | Keith Fletcher (2) | England | 656 | Max Walker | Australia | 497 | Chris Old | England | 170 |
| 1974 | Keith Fletcher | England | 517 | Geoff Arnold (3) | England | 444 | Tony Greig (2) | England | 125 |
| 1973 | Dennis Amiss | England | 465 | Geoff Arnold (2) | England | 410 | Tony Greig | England | 90 |
| 1972 | Keith Stackpole | Australia | 371 | Geoff Arnold | England | 376 | Greg Chappell | Australia | 60 |
| 1971 | John Edrich | England | 246 | Keith Stackpole | Australia | 141 | Keith Stackpole | Australia | 13 |

==== Top 10 rankings: batting and bowling with a peak rating of 850 points or more ====
Top 10 Rankings Batting
| Rank | Name | Played for | Highest rating | Year |
|---|---|---|---|---|
| 1 | Sir Vivian Richards | West Indies | 935 | 1985 |
| 2 | Zaheer Abbas | Pakistan | 931 | 1983 |
| 3 | Greg Chappell | Australia | 921 | 1981 |
| 4 | David Gower | England | 918 | 1983 |
| 5 | Dean Jones | Australia | 915 | 1991 |
| 6 | Virat Kohli | India | 909 | 2018 |
| 7 | Javed Miandad | Pakistan | 908 | 1987 |
| 8 | Brian Lara | West Indies | 906 | 1993 |
| 9 | AB de Villiers | South Africa | 901 | 2015 |
| 10 | Babar Azam | Pakistan | 898 | 2022 |

Top 10 Rankings Bowling
| Rank | Name | Played for | Highest rating | Year |
|---|---|---|---|---|
| 1 | Joel Garner | West Indies | 940 | 1985 |
| 2 | Sir Richard Hadlee | New Zealand | 923 | 1983 |
| 3 | Shaun Pollock | South Africa | 917 | 2007 |
| 4 | Muttiah Muralitharan | Sri Lanka | 913 | 2002 |
| 5 | Glenn McGrath | Australia | 903 | 2002 |
| 6 | Ewen Chatfield | New Zealand | 892 | 1984 |
| 7 | Malcolm Marshall | West Indies | 891 | 1985 |
| 7 | Dennis Lillee | Australia | 891 | 1982 |
| 9 | Curtly Ambrose | West Indies | 877 | 1991 |
| 10 | Michael Holding | West Indies | 875 | 1985 |

Top 10 Rankings All-rounder
| Rank | Name | Played for | Highest rating | Year |
|---|---|---|---|---|
| 1 | Kapil Dev | India | 631 | 1985 |
| 2 | Greg Chappell | Australia | 568 | 1982 |
| 3 | Andrew Flintoff | England | 543 | 2004 |
| 4 | Viv Richards | West Indies | 532 | 1985 |
| 5 | Lance Klusener | South Africa | 521 | 1999 |
| 6 | Chris Gayle | West Indies | 509 | 2003 |
| 7 | Jacques Kallis | South Africa | 505 | 2001 |
| 8 | Steve Waugh | Australia | 501 | 1988 |
| 9 | Shaun Pollock | South Africa | 494 | 2008 |
| 10 | Imran Khan | Pakistan | 480 | 1983 |
| 10 | Ravi Shastri | India | 480 | 1986 |

=== Historical T20I rankings ===
==== Year end top ranked players in T20I cricket ====
| Year | Top Batsman | Country | Rating | Top Bowler | Country | Rating | Top All-rounder | Country | Rating |
|---|---|---|---|---|---|---|---|---|---|
| 2025 | Abhishek Sharma | India | 908 | Varun Chakravarthy | India | 804 | Saim Ayub | Pakistan | 295 |
| 2024 | Travis Head | Australia | 855 | Akeal Hosein | West Indies | 707 | Hardik Pandya | India | 244 |
| 2023 | Suryakumar Yadav (2) | India | 887 | Adil Rashid | England | 726 | Shakib Al Hasan (5) | Bangladesh | 256 |
| 2022 | Suryakumar Yadav | India | 890 | Wanindu Hasaranga (2) | Sri Lanka | 704 | Shakib Al Hasan (4) | Bangladesh | 252 |
| 2021 | Babar Azam (3) | Pakistan | 805 | Wanindu Hasaranga | Sri Lanka | 797 | Mohammad Nabi (3) | Afghanistan | 265 |
| 2021 | Dawid Malan (2) | England | 805 | Wanindu Hasaranga | Sri Lanka | 797 | Mohammad Nabi (3) | Afghanistan | 265 |
| 2020 | Dawid Malan | England | 915 | Rashid Khan (3) | Afghanistan | 736 | Mohammad Nabi (2) | Afghanistan | 294 |
| 2019 | Babar Azam (2) | Pakistan | 879 | Rashid Khan (2) | Afghanistan | 749 | Mohammad Nabi | Afghanistan | 319 |
| 2018 | Babar Azam | Pakistan | 858 | Rashid Khan | Afghanistan | 793 | Glenn Maxwell (2) | Australia | 362 |
| 2017 | Aaron Finch (2) | Australia | 784 | Imad Wasim | Pakistan | 719 | Shakib Al Hasan (3) | Bangladesh | 353 |
| 2016 | Virat Kohli (2) | India | 820 | Imran Tahir | South Africa | 740 | Glenn Maxwell | Australia | 388 |
| 2015 | Aaron Finch | Australia | 854 | Sunil Narine (2) | West Indies | 773 | Shakib Al Hasan (2) | Bangladesh | 361 |
| 2014 | Virat Kohli | India | 909 | Samuel Badree | West Indies | 831 | Shakib Al Hasan | Bangladesh | 378 |
| 2013 | Alex Hales | England | 842 | Sunil Narine | West Indies | 817 | Shane Watson (3) | Australia | 446 |
| 2012 | Shane Watson | Australia | 799 | Saeed Ajmal | Pakistan | 756 | Shane Watson (2) | Australia | 531 |
| 2011 | Eoin Morgan | England | 821 | Ajantha Mendis | Sri Lanka | 739 | Shane Watson | Australia | 379 |
| 2010 | Kevin Pietersen | England | 847 | Graeme Swann | England | 760 | Shahid Afridi (2) | Pakistan | 381 |
| 2009 | Graeme Smith (2) | South Africa | 766 | Shahid Afridi | Pakistan | 803 | Shahid Afridi | Pakistan | 412 |
| 2008 | Misbah-ul-Haq | Pakistan | 645 | Umar Gul (2) | Pakistan | 689 | Andrew Symonds (4) | Australia | 209 |
| 2007 | Andrew Symonds | Australia | 636 | Umar Gul | Pakistan | 557 | Andrew Symonds (3) | Australia | 228 |
| 2006 | Graeme Smith | South Africa | 548 | Andre Adams (2) | New Zealand | 183 | Andrew Symonds (2) | Australia | 71 |
| 2005 | Ricky Ponting | Australia | 464 | Brett Lee | Australia | 110 | Andrew Symonds | Australia | 20 |
| 2005 | Ricky Ponting | Australia | 464 | Andre Adams | New Zealand | 110 | Andrew Symonds | Australia | 20 |

==== Top 10 T20I rankings: batting and bowling with a peak rating of 750 points or more ====
Top 10 Rankings Batting
| Rank | Name | Team | Highest rating | Year |
|---|---|---|---|---|
| 1 | Abhishek Sharma | India | 931 | 2025 |
| 2 | Dawid Malan | England | 919 | 2020 |
| 3 | Ishan Kishan | India | 916 | 2026 |
| 4 | Suryakumar Yadav | India | 912 | 2023 |
| 5 | Virat Kohli | India | 909 | 2014 |
| 6 | Aaron Finch | Australia | 904 | 2014 |
| 7 | Babar Azam | Pakistan | 900 | 2019 |
| 8 | David Warner | Australia | 894 | 2010 |
| 9 | Kevin Pietersen | England | 886 | 2010 |
| 10 | Travis Head | Australia | 885 | 2024 |

Top 10 Rankings Bowling
| Rank | Name | Team | Highest rating | Year |
|---|---|---|---|---|
| 1 | Umar Gul | Pakistan | 865 | 2009 |
| 2 | Samuel Badree | West Indies | 864 | 2014 |
| 3 | Daniel Vettori | New Zealand | 858 | 2010 |
| 4 | Sunil Narine | West Indies | 832 | 2013 |
| 5 | Rashid Khan | Afghanistan | 828 | 2018 |
| 6 | Tabraiz Shamsi | South Africa | 827 | 2021 |
| 7 | Shahid Afridi | Pakistan | 822 | 2009 |
| 8 | Varun Chakravarthy | India | 818 | 2025 |
| 9 | Shadab Khan | Pakistan | 811 | 2018 |
| 10 | Wanindu Hasaranga | Sri Lanka | 809 | 2021 |

Top 10 Rankings All-rounder
| Rank | Name | Played for | Highest rating | Year |
|---|---|---|---|---|
| 1 | Shane Watson | Australia | 566 | 2012 |
| 2 | Mohammed Hafeez | Pakistan | 452 | 2013 |
| 3 | Shahid Afridi | Pakistan | 437 | 2009 |
| 4 | Shakib Al Hasan | Bangladesh | 420 | 2015 |
| 5 | Glenn Maxwell | Australia | 375 | 2016 |
| 6 | Sanath Jayasuriya | Sri Lanka | 366 | 2010 |
| 7 | Yuvraj Singh | India | 363 | 2013 |
| 8 | Mohammad Nabi | Afghanistan | 361 | 2019 |
| 9 | Sikandar Raza | Zimbabwe | 339 | 2026 |
| 10 | David Hussey | Australia | 337 | 2012 |

== See also ==
- ICC Men's Test Team Rankings
- ICC Men's ODI Team Rankings
- ICC Men's T20I Team Rankings
- International cricket
- ICC Women's Player Rankings
