= 1975 Cricket World Cup officials =

The first Cricket World Cup was played in England on six different venues. A total of 15 matches were played in the competition, including two semi-finals and a final match.

== Umpires ==
Seven of the eight umpires selected to stand in the competition where from England, with Bill Alley from Australia the only other umpire. The first semi-final was umpired by Alley and David Constant, with Lloyd Budd and Arthur Fagg officiating in the second. Dickie Bird and Tom Spencer were chosen to stand in the first World Cup final.

Umpire	Country	Matches umpired
Bill Alley	Australia	4
Dickie Bird	England	4
Lloyd Budd	England	4
David Constant	England	4
Arthur Fagg	England	4
Arthur Jepson	England	3
John Langridge	England	3
Tom Spencer	England	4
