= 1975 Cricket World Cup =

Inaugural men's Cricket World Cup tournament

Prudential Cup '75
- Tournament logo
- Dates: 7 – 21 June 1975
- Administrator: International Cricket Conference
- Cricket format: One Day International
- Tournament format(s): Round robin and knockout
- Host: England
- Champions: West Indies (1st title)
- Runners-up: Australia
- Participants: 8
- Matches: 15
- Attendance: 158,000 (10,533 per match)
- Most runs: (New Zealand) Glenn Turner (333)
- Most wickets: (Australia) Gary Gilmour (11)

The 1975 Cricket World Cup (officially called the Prudential Cup '75) was the inaugural men's Cricket World Cup, and the first major tournament in the history of One Day International (ODI) cricket. Organised by the International Cricket Conference (ICC), it took place in England, between 7 June and 21 June 1975.

The tournament was sponsored by Prudential Assurance Company and had eight participating countries: the six Test-playing teams of the time – Australia, England, India, New Zealand, Pakistan, the West Indies – and the two leading Associate nations at the time – Sri Lanka and East Africa. The teams were divided into two groups of four, with each team playing each other in their group once; the top two from each group qualified for the semi-finals, with the winners of these matches meeting in the final. Each match consisted of 60 overs per side and was played in traditional white clothing and with red balls; all were played and ended in daylight.

England and New Zealand finished as the top two teams in Group A, while the West Indies finished top of the Group B table ahead of Australia as the four teams qualified through to the semi-finals. After Australia defeated England and the West Indies defeated New Zealand in the semi-finals, the West Indies which came into the tournament as favourites, defeated Australia in the final at Lord's by 17 runs to become the first World Cup winners. New Zealand batsman, Glenn Turner was the top run-scorer for the tournament with 333 runs, whilst Australian bowler Gary Gilmour was the top wicket-taker with 11 wickets despite only playing in the final two matches.

== Background ==
The first multilateral cricket competition at international level was the 1912 Triangular Tournament in England. This was played between the three test nations at the time – England, Australia and South Africa. The concept was later dropped because of inclement weather and a lack of public interest. The first one-day match to occur was in 1962 when four English county cricket teams filled in a gap to play in a limited overs knockout competition. It was won by Northamptonshire who defeated Leicestershire by five wickets.

The limited-over format had been used in what sponsors marketed as a 'World Cricket Cup' in England in 1966 and 1967, contested between England, a Rest of the World XI, and a touring team (the West Indies in 1966 and Pakistan in 1967). The marketing of the event was clearly influenced by the hosting of the 1966 FIFA World Cup in the same country. The 1966 'World Cricket Cup' was won by England, that in 1967 by the Rest of the World. A report in the Cricketer implied that the last such match in this "Triangular Tournament", between Pakistan and the Rest of the World was neither well-attended nor taken entirely seriously: "It was a pity that a larger crowd was not present ... Sobers took the Cup and the World Xl took the gold medals. They must have enjoyed their holiday".

It was not until 1971 that the first official One Day International (ODI) took place at the Melbourne Cricket Ground (MCG). It was a replacement for the third Test of the 1970–71 Ashes series between Australia and England, which had been severely affected by heavy rain for its first three days. The ODI was a forty-over match, each over being of eight deliveries. After England made 190 from 39.4 overs, Australia chased the target at a steady rate, reaching victory with 42 balls remaining. Two years later at Lord's during the 1973 Women's Cricket World Cup, plans were made for a men's tournament to take place in 1975. The tournament was planned to involve all the Test nations at the time in two group stages with the top two in each group qualifying for the knockout stage with the final at Lord's.

== Format ==
The format of the 1975 Cricket World Cup had the eight teams split into two groups of four, with each team playing the others in their group once. Each match was played over 60 overs per side with group stage matches scheduled to take place between 7 and 14 June. Each match was played entirely during day, with a cut-off time of 7.30 pm. Three days were allocated to each match with each able to be continued if they were halted for rain or bad light.

The top two teams from each group advanced to the semi-finals on 18 June, with the winners qualifying for the final at Lord's on 21 June.

== Participants ==
The eight teams which participated in the tournament. Qualified as ICC full member Invitation

Eight teams were invited to compete at the World Cup: the six full members of the International Cricket Conference (ICC), and two other teams – Sri Lanka and East Africa. South Africa was not allowed to complete due to the sporting boycott of the country which took place during the apartheid era, the ICC having placed a moratorium on tours of the country in 1970.

Before the competition began the teams were split into two groups. The ICC made the decision to place the two teams which were not Test playing countries in separate groups. They also decided to place England and Australia in separate groups and to do the same with India and Pakistan.

Team	Method of qualification	Group
Australia	Full member	B
East Africa	Invitation	A
England	Full member and host	A
India	Full member	A
New Zealand	Full member	A
Pakistan	Full member	B
Sri Lanka	Invitation	B
West Indies	Full member	B

== Venues ==
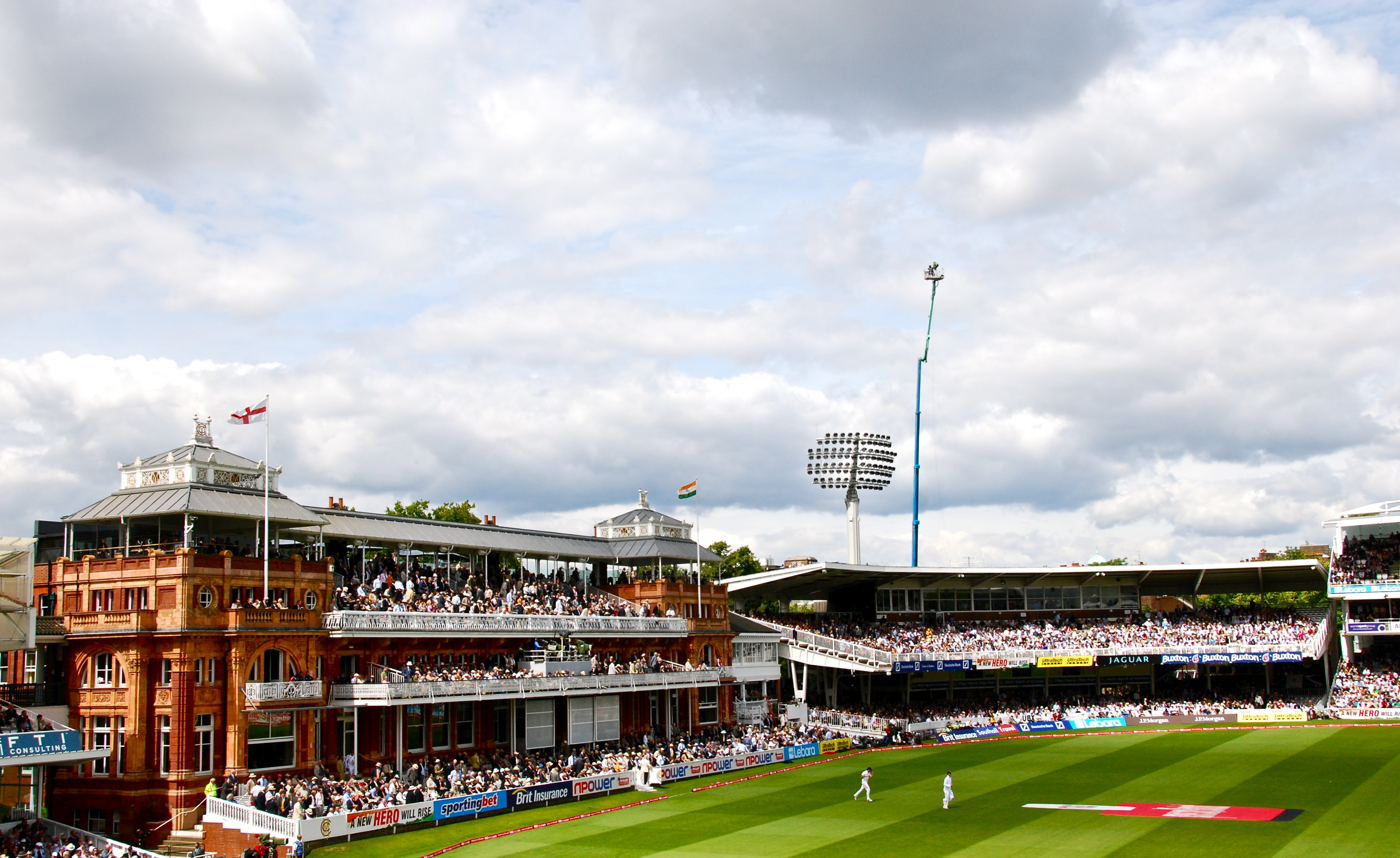
The final of the tournament was played at Lord's in London.

Six grounds were used to host matches during the tournament. The announcement of venues began on 26 July 1973 when the ICC announced that the tournament would be played, with Lord's as the venue for the final. The remaining venues were announced on 5 November 1974, with the scheduling for the tournament announced alongside that for the five county cricket tournaments that would take place during the 1975 season.

Other than Lord's, which hosted only one group stage match, and The Oval which hosted three, each of the grounds was used for two matches during the group stage. Headingley and The Oval were the grounds chosen for the two semi-finals.

City	Ground	Capacity
London	Lord's	25,000
London	The Oval	23,500
Birmingham	Edgbaston	20,000
Manchester	Old Trafford	19,000
Nottingham	Trent Bridge	15,350
Leeds	Headingley	21,000

== Squads ==
Before the competition began each team named a squad of 14 players.

== Preparations ==
Heading into the first Cricket World Cup, the Ladbrokes betting agency had the West Indies as the favourites at 9–4. This was followed by England at 11–4 with Pakistan and Australia in third and fourth respectively. East Africa was last in the betting odds at 1500–1. Before the tournament, most of the teams played in warm-up matches against English county teams to get used to the English conditions with most of the national teams getting wins. Only East Africa, Sri Lanka and India lost at least one warm-up match before the tournament. Australia played in Canada, losing to Eastern Canada and drawing with Toronto, before heading to England.

Eight days before the World Cup, the ICC declared in a unanimous decision that any of the balls that went over a batsman's head would be called wide due to the fast short-pitched bowling.

== Group stage ==
=== Summary ===
The opening round of matches took place on 7 June with four matches being played. The match at Lord's saw England deliver the highest score by a team in the 60 over match with 334 runs being scored. Dennis Amiss top-scored for the English with 137 from 147 balls helped by Keith Fletcher and Chris Old who each recorded a half-century. In response, Sunil Gavaskar batted through the entire innings for only 36 runs off 174 balls, prompting Gulabrai Ramchand to speculate that he was treating the match as batting practice. Australia opened their campaign with a win against Pakistan at Headingley with a 73-run victory. This was due to Dennis Lillee's five-wicket haul, which brought Pakistan's hope of a win crashing down as they collapsed from 181 for four to be all out for 205. Earlier, Ross Edwards top-scored for Australia with 80 as he aided the Australians in getting 94 runs from the last 13 overs to bring Australia to 278 for seven from their 60 overs. The other two matches saw easy wins for the West Indies and New Zealand. For Glenn Turner, he occupied the crease during the whole New Zealand innings as he top-scored with 171 as New Zealand won by 181 runs over East Africa. The West Indies took a nine-wicket victory over Sri Lanka who became the first team to score under 100 runs in a One Day International.

Despite missing two players due to operation – Asif Iqbal – and examinations – Imran Khan – Pakistan was not fazed by the missing players in the second round of games with the team scoring 266 for seven from their 60 overs with standing captain Majid Khan top-scoring for Pakistan with 60. In response, the West Indies fell to 166 for eight which included a period of three wickets for only 10 runs as Bernard Julien, Clive Lloyd and Keith Boyce all losing their wickets. But the last wicket pair of Deryck Murray and Andy Roberts stole the match away as the West Indies won by a wicket off the final over. The other match in Group B saw Australia claim their second victory, but it was not all smooth with the Australian captain Ian Chappell remarking in an interview that the English media was trying to unsettle Australia's plans due to the Jeff Thomson no-ball problem with Chappell saying: "I've seen this sort of thing before in England". On the field, Alan Turner scored a century as Australia ended with 328 with Sri Lanka falling 52 runs short as John Mason from The Daily Telegraph stated that they might not have many new admirers with their short ball stuff sending two Sri Lankan batsman to hospital. Group A saw two convincing wins to England and India. At Trent Bridge, Keith Fletcher top-scored for England with 131 as he guided the English to their second victory and going to the lead of the group table with an 80-run win over New Zealand. The other match in Group A saw 720 spectators observe India record a 10-wicket victory with Madan Lal taking three wickets for India, after East Africa were all-out for only 120.

With the match sold out four days in advance, the West Indies took on Australia to see who would finish top of Group B. With the ball swinging in the air, the pair of Rod Marsh and Ross Edwards guided Australia to 192 with a 99-run partnership for the sixth wicket after Australia fell to 61/5. In response, the West Indies went on to take a seven-wicket victory with Alvin Kallicharran top-scoring with 78 (which included a period of 31 runs from nine Dennis Lillee deliveries) as the West Indies finished top of Group B. Pakistan ended their tournament with a 192-run victory over Sri Lanka at Trent Bridge, with half-centuries by Zaheer Abbas, Majid Khan and Sadiq Mohammad. In Group A, New Zealand sealed their spot in the semi-finals with a four-wicket victory over India off the back of a century from Glenn Turner as he hit twelve fours on his way to an unbeaten innings of 114. The other match in Group A saw England clinch a 196-run victory over East Africa; England scored 290/5 from their 60 overs off the back of a 158-run opening partnership between Dennis Amiss and Barry Wood before a bowling attack led by John Snow (taking 4 for 11 from his 12 overs) ran through the East Africans, who were bowled out for 94 in 52.3 overs. Only Ramesh Sethi offered much resistance, lasting for 32 overs to score 30.

=== Group A ===
Pos	Team	Pld	W	L	T	NR	Pts	RR
1	England	3	3	0	0	0	12	4.944
2	New Zealand	3	2	1	0	0	8	4.071
3	India	3	1	2	0	0	4	3.237
4	East Africa	3	0	3	0	0	0	1.900

Source: ESPNcricinfo

7 June 1975	England; 334/4 (60 overs)	v	India; 132/3 (60 overs)	England won by 202 runs
Scorecard	England; 334/4 (60 overs)	v	India; 132/3 (60 overs)	Lord's, London; Umpires: David Constant (Eng) and John Langridge (Eng); Player of the match: Dennis Amiss (Eng)
Scorecard	Dennis Amiss 137 (147); Syed Abid Ali 2/58 (12 overs)		Gundappa Viswanath 37 (59); Peter Lever 1/16 (10 overs)	Lord's, London; Umpires: David Constant (Eng) and John Langridge (Eng); Player of the match: Dennis Amiss (Eng)

7 June 1975	New Zealand; 309/5 (60 overs)	v	East Africa; 128/8 (60 overs)	New Zealand won by 181 runs
Scorecard	New Zealand; 309/5 (60 overs)	v	East Africa; 128/8 (60 overs)	Edgbaston, Birmingham; Umpires: Dickie Bird (Eng) and Arthur Fagg (Eng); Player of the match: Glenn Turner (NZ)
Scorecard	Glenn Turner 171 (201); Parbhu Nana 1/34 (12 overs)		Frasat Ali 45 (123); Dayle Hadlee 3/21 (12 overs)	Edgbaston, Birmingham; Umpires: Dickie Bird (Eng) and Arthur Fagg (Eng); Player of the match: Glenn Turner (NZ)

11 June 1975	England; 266/6 (60 overs)	v	New Zealand; 186 (60 overs)	England won by 80 runs
Scorecard	England; 266/6 (60 overs)	v	New Zealand; 186 (60 overs)	Trent Bridge, Nottingham; Umpires: Bill Alley (Eng) and Tom Spencer (Eng); Player of the match: Keith Fletcher (Eng)
Scorecard	Keith Fletcher 131 (147); Richard Collinge 2/43 (12 overs)		John Morrison 55 (85); Tony Greig 4/45 (12 overs)	Trent Bridge, Nottingham; Umpires: Bill Alley (Eng) and Tom Spencer (Eng); Player of the match: Keith Fletcher (Eng)

11 June 1975	East Africa; 120 (55.3 overs)	v	India; 123/0 (29.5 overs)	India won by 10 wickets
Scorecard	East Africa; 120 (55.3 overs)	v	India; 123/0 (29.5 overs)	Headingley, Leeds; Umpires: Dickie Bird (Eng) and Arthur Jepson (Eng); Player of the match: Farokh Engineer (Ind)
Scorecard	Jawahir Shah 37 (84); Madan Lal 3/15 (9.3 overs)		Sunil Gavaskar 65* (86)	Headingley, Leeds; Umpires: Dickie Bird (Eng) and Arthur Jepson (Eng); Player of the match: Farokh Engineer (Ind)

14 June 1975	England; 290/5 (60 overs)	v	East Africa; 94 (52.3 overs)	England won by 196 runs
Scorecard	England; 290/5 (60 overs)	v	East Africa; 94 (52.3 overs)	Edgbaston, Birmingham; Umpires: Bill Alley (Eng) and John Langridge (Eng); Player of the match: John Snow (Eng)
Scorecard	Dennis Amiss 88 (116); Zulfiqar Ali 3/63 (12 overs)		Ramesh Sethi 30 (102); John Snow 4/11 (12 overs)	Edgbaston, Birmingham; Umpires: Bill Alley (Eng) and John Langridge (Eng); Player of the match: John Snow (Eng)

14 June 1975	India; 230 (60 overs)	v	New Zealand; 233/6 (58.5 overs)	New Zealand won by 4 wickets
Scorecard	India; 230 (60 overs)	v	New Zealand; 233/6 (58.5 overs)	Old Trafford, Manchester; Umpires: Lloyd Budd (Eng) and Arthur Fagg (Eng); Player of the match: Glenn Turner (NZ)
Scorecard	Syed Abid Ali 70 (98); Brian McKechnie 3/49 (12 overs)		Glenn Turner 114* (177); Syed Abid Ali 2/35 (12 overs)	Old Trafford, Manchester; Umpires: Lloyd Budd (Eng) and Arthur Fagg (Eng); Player of the match: Glenn Turner (NZ)

=== Group B ===
Pos	Team	Pld	W	L	T	NR	Pts	RR
1	West Indies	3	3	0	0	0	12	4.346
2	Australia	3	2	1	0	0	8	4.433
3	Pakistan	3	1	2	0	0	4	4.450
4	Sri Lanka	3	0	3	0	0	0	2.778

Source: ESPNcricinfo

7 June 1975	Australia; 278/7 (60 overs)	v	Pakistan; 205 (53 overs)	Australia won by 73 runs
Scorecard	Australia; 278/7 (60 overs)	v	Pakistan; 205 (53 overs)	Headingley, Leeds; Umpires: Bill Alley (Eng) and Tom Spencer (Eng); Player of the match: Dennis Lillee (AUS)
Scorecard	Ross Edwards 80* (94); Naseer Malik 2/37 (12 overs)		Majid Khan 65 (76); Dennis Lillee 5/34 (12 overs)	Headingley, Leeds; Umpires: Bill Alley (Eng) and Tom Spencer (Eng); Player of the match: Dennis Lillee (AUS)

7 June 1975	Sri Lanka; 86 (37.2 overs)	v	West Indies; 87/1 (20.4 overs)	West Indies won by 9 wickets
Scorecard	Sri Lanka; 86 (37.2 overs)	v	West Indies; 87/1 (20.4 overs)	Old Trafford, Manchester; Umpires: Lloyd Budd (Eng) and Arthur Jepson (Eng); Player of the match: Bernard Julien (WI)
Scorecard	Somachandra de Silva 21 (54); Bernard Julien 2/16 (12 overs)		Roy Fredericks 33 (38); Somachandra de Silva 1/33 (8 overs)	Old Trafford, Manchester; Umpires: Lloyd Budd (Eng) and Arthur Jepson (Eng); Player of the match: Bernard Julien (WI)

11 June 1975	Australia; 328/5 (60 overs)	v	Sri Lanka; 276/4 (60 overs)	Australia won by 52 runs
Scorecard	Australia; 328/5 (60 overs)	v	Sri Lanka; 276/4 (60 overs)	The Oval, London; Umpires: Lloyd Budd (Eng) and Arthur Fagg (Eng); Player of the match: Alan Turner (AUS)
Scorecard	Alan Turner 101 (113); Somachandra de Silva 2/60 (12 overs)		Sunil Wettimuny 53 (102); Ian Chappell 2/14 (4 overs)	The Oval, London; Umpires: Lloyd Budd (Eng) and Arthur Fagg (Eng); Player of the match: Alan Turner (AUS)

11 June 1975	Pakistan; 266/7 (60 overs)	v	West Indies; 267/9 (59.4 overs)	West Indies won by 1 wicket
Scorecard	Pakistan; 266/7 (60 overs)	v	West Indies; 267/9 (59.4 overs)	Edgbaston, Birmingham; Umpires: David Constant (Eng) and John Langridge (Eng); Player of the match: Sarfraz Nawaz (Pak)
Scorecard	Majid Khan 60 (108); Viv Richards 1/21 (4 overs)		Deryck Murray 61* (76); Sarfraz Nawaz 4/44 (12 overs)	Edgbaston, Birmingham; Umpires: David Constant (Eng) and John Langridge (Eng); Player of the match: Sarfraz Nawaz (Pak)

14 June 1975	Australia; 192 (53.4 overs)	v	West Indies; 195/3 (46 overs)	West Indies won by 7 wickets
Scorecard	Australia; 192 (53.4 overs)	v	West Indies; 195/3 (46 overs)	The Oval, London; Umpires: Dickie Bird (Eng) and David Constant (Eng); Player of the match: Alvin Kallicharran (WI)
Scorecard	Ross Edwards 58 (74); Andy Roberts 3/39 (10.4 overs)		Alvin Kallicharran 78 (83); Ashley Mallett 1/35 (11 overs)	The Oval, London; Umpires: Dickie Bird (Eng) and David Constant (Eng); Player of the match: Alvin Kallicharran (WI)

14 June 1975	Pakistan; 330/6 (60 overs)	v	Sri Lanka; 138 (50.1 overs)	Pakistan won by 192 runs
Scorecard	Pakistan; 330/6 (60 overs)	v	Sri Lanka; 138 (50.1 overs)	Trent Bridge, Nottingham; Umpires: Arthur Jepson (Eng) and Tom Spencer (Eng); Player of the match: Zaheer Abbas (Pak)
Scorecard	Zaheer Abbas 97 (89); Tony Opatha 2/67 (12 overs)		Anura Tennekoon 30 (36); Imran Khan 3/15 (7.1 overs)	Trent Bridge, Nottingham; Umpires: Arthur Jepson (Eng) and Tom Spencer (Eng); Player of the match: Zaheer Abbas (Pak)

== Knockout stage ==
The knockout stage of the Cricket World Cup consisted of two single-elimination rounds leading to a final. If the match was delayed due to rain there were two reserve days to play out the match.

Semi-finals
18 June – Leeds
England	93
Australia	94/6
18 June – London (Oval)
New Zealand	158
West Indies	159/5

Final
21 June – London (Lord's)
Australia	274
West Indies	291/8

=== Semi-finals ===
The first semi-final was between England and Australia at Headingley. Australia's one change in bringing in Gary Gilmour for Ashley Mallett proved critical in booking the team's spot in the final; this was due to the grassy pitch, which both captains would criticise after the match. After Australia elected to field first, Gilmour took six wickets for 14 runs; after he bowled his 12 overs, England were 37 for seven. Mike Denness attempted to bring England back but lost his wicket as England fell for 93. In the run-chase Australia collapsed to 39 for six before Gilmour partnered with Doug Walters, and they chased the remaining runs to earn Australia a berth in the final.

The second semi-final was between the West Indies and New Zealand at The Oval. Batting first, New Zealand reached 92 for only one loss at the lunch break. After lunch, though, they collapsed to 158 with Geoff Howarth top-scoring for New Zealand with 51, while Bernard Julien was the top wicket taker with four wickets. In the run chase, a 125-run second-wicket partnership between Alvin Kallicharran (top-scoring with 72) and Gordon Greenidge (55 runs) laid the foundation for a five-wicket victory. Richard Collinge was the only bowler to trouble the West Indies, with figures of three for 28 runs from his twelve overs.

18 June 1975
Scorecard

England; 93 (36.2 overs)	v	Australia; 94/6 (28.4 overs)
Mike Denness 27 (60); Gary Gilmour 6/14 (12 overs)		Gary Gilmour 28* (28); Chris Old 3/29 (7 overs)

Australia won by 4 wickets
Headingley, Leeds
Umpires: Bill Alley (Eng) and David Constant (Eng)
Player of the match: Gary Gilmour (Aus)

18 June 1975
Scorecard

New Zealand; 158 (52.2 overs)	v	West Indies; 159/5 (40.1 overs)
Geoff Howarth 51 (93); Bernard Julien 4/27 (12 overs)		Alvin Kallicharran 72 (92); Richard Collinge 3/28 (12 overs)

West Indies won by 5 wickets
The Oval, London
Umpires: Lloyd Budd (Eng) and Arthur Fagg (Eng)
Player of the match: Alvin Kallicharran (WI)

=== Final ===
The final match on 21 June was sold out three days beforehand. The West Indies, favourites to win, were asked by Ian Chappell to bat first and went on to score 291 for eight from 60 overs. After being given a second chance from a Ross Edwards dropped chance at mid-wicket, Clive Lloyd went on to top-score for the West Indies with 102. Gary Gilmour was the best of the Australian bowlers with five wickets for 48 runs. In response, Ian Chappell scored a half-century to set up the foundation for Australia before three run-outs from the hands of Viv Richards put the pressure on Australia as they collapsed to 233 for nine. A final-wicket partnership of 41 from Dennis Lillee and Jeff Thomson brought Australia within 18 runs of victory; but the fifth run-out of the innings saw Australia bowled out for 274 so that the West Indies won by 17 runs, claiming the first men's World Cup.

21 June 1975
Scorecard

West Indies; 291/8 (60 overs)	v	Australia; 274 (58.4 overs)
Clive Lloyd 102 (85); Gary Gilmour 5/48 (12 overs)		Ian Chappell 62 (93); Keith Boyce 4/50 (12 overs)

West Indies won by 17 runs
Lord's, London
Umpires: Dickie Bird (Eng) and Tom Spencer (Eng)
Player of the match: Clive Lloyd (WI)

== Statistics ==
Glenn Turner of New Zealand ended the tournament as the leading run scorer for the 1975 edition with his 333 runs coming in four games which included an unbeaten 171 against East Africa, which was also the highest score of the tournament. In second place was English player Dennis Amiss with Pakistan's Majid Khan rounding out the top three. Australian player Gary Gilmour was the tournament's leading wicket taker with 11 wickets from his two games, which included the best tournament figures in the semi-finals when he took six wickets for 14 against England. Bernard Julien and Keith Boyce (both from the West Indies) finished in second place, both getting 10 wickets for the tournament.

=== Most runs ===
Player	Team	Innings	Runs	High score
Glenn Turner	New Zealand	4	333	171 not out
Dennis Amiss	England	4	243	137
Majid Khan	Pakistan	3	209	84
Keith Fletcher	England	3	207	131
Alan Turner	Australia	5	201	101

- Source: CricInfo

=== Most wickets ===
Player	Team	Matches	Wickets	Best bowling
Gary Gilmour	Australia	2	11	6/14
Bernard Julien	West Indies	5	10	4/20
Keith Boyce	West Indies	5	10	4/50
Dayle Hadlee	New Zealand	4	8	3/21
Andy Roberts	West Indies	5	8	3/39

- Source: CricInfo
