= Alan Turner (cricketer) =

Australian cricketer

Personal information
- Full name: Alan Turner
- Born: 23 July 1950 (age 76); Camperdown, Sydney, New South Wales, Australia
- Nickname: Fitter-an
- Batting: Left-handed

International information
- National side: Australia
- Test debut (cap 273): 10 July 1975 v England
- Last Test: 25 February 1977 v New Zealand
- ODI debut (cap 30): 7 June 1975 v Pakistan
- Last ODI: 20 December 1975 v West Indies

Domestic team information
- Years: Team
- 1968/69–1977/78: New South Wales

Career statistics
Competition	Test	ODI	FC	LA
Matches	14	6	105	21
Runs scored	768	247	5,744	624
Batting average	29.53	41.16	30.88	29.71
100s/50s	1/3	1/0	7/31	1/2
Top score	136	101	156	101
Catches/stumpings	15/–	3/–	80/–	4/–
Medal record
Men's Cricket
Representing Australia
ICC Cricket World Cup
Runner-up	1975 England
- Source: ESPNcricinfo, 24 January 2012

Alan Turner (born 23 July 1950) is a former Australian cricketer. He was a left-handed batsman who played for New South Wales from 1968 until retirement in 1978. He scored over 5,700 runs as a stocky opener with a practised cut shot, though he was not able to prove his abilities at best at international level. He played in fourteen Test matches and six One Day Internationals from 1975 to 1977. On the back of his several good Sheffield Shield seasons he was selected for Australian tours of England and New Zealand. He scored a single Test century against the touring West Indian side in 1975–76. The cricket writer Peter Hanlon described Turner as "an ordinary man in the company of Gods." He was a part of the Australian squad which finished as runners-up at the 1975 Cricket World Cup.

His nickname was "Fitter-an'", as in "fitter and turner".

== Career ==
After leaving school, Turner went to work for British American Tobacco. He stayed there for 43 years, working in management in finance and accounting, sales, marketing, and supply chain.

=== Early first-class cricket ===
Turner made his first-class debut in 1968–69. He was a solid performer for New South Wales, scoring eight fifties in 1969–70. He made his first first-class century in 1971–72.

=== 1975 Tour of England and Canada ===
Turner was selected for the 1975 tour of Canada and England after a 1974–75 season where he scored 578 runs at 32.11 with a top score of 88. Captain Ian Chappell admitted "some might consider" Turner's selection "a surprise, but he is a hard, tough, experienced player with a strong season behind him. Turner has opened the innings for NSW and has batted in a variety of positions. For this reason he must have been given the nod over Ashley Woodcock, who was most unfortunate to have broken down in the last Shield game."

==== 1975 World Cup ====
Turner made his first appearance for Australia in the 1975 Cricket World Cup, scoring 46 against Pakistan. then in a match against Sri Lanka, became the first Australian to score a century in a One Day International. He scored 101 runs from 113 balls, all in the morning session prior to his dismissal, in a partnership of 182 with fellow opening bat Rick McCosker. His blistering innings included 9 fours and a six.

He followed this with 7 against the West Indies, 7 in the semi-final against England and 40 in the final against the West Indies.

==== 1975 Ashes ====
Turner made his Test debut against England in 1975. "No one said much to me before my first Test," he recalled. "You were an Australian, you'd got there because you could play, and you were expected to man up."

He scored 37, taking part in an opening stand of 80 with Rick McCosker, helping Australia win by an innings. Australia had struggled to find a consistent opening combination under Ian Chappell and so Turner's debut was considered promising.

However Turner performed less well in the next match, making 9 and 21. 105 runs in eight first class innings saw him dropped for the third test in favour of Gary Gilmour. A score of 118 against Essex saw him back for the 4th test, making 2 and 8.

"I underestimated the toughness of an Ashes battle," said Turner. "It was a lot more intense than I imagined, and I failed to distinguish myself with the bat."

=== 1975-76 vs West Indies ===
Turner began the 1975-76 summer well, making 106 and 66 for NSW against the West Indies. He was picked in the Australian side for the first test and made 81 and 26.

Turner then scored 23 and 0, 21 and 7 and 53 and 15. In the fifth test Turner made 26 and 136, his debut century. "I wasn't nervous after I reach ed 80 and just put my head down to make sure of the century," he said. "It was a bit of a relief to get the ... 100 because I could then get back to scoring more runs".

In the 6th test Turner made 30 and 21.

"That Australian team was very committed to each other and to the cause," he recalled. "There were no divisions."

He made 46 in a one-day game against the West Indies.

=== 1976-77 ===
Turner was selected against Pakistan. He scored 33 and 48 in the first game, a game memorable for Turner's collision with Jeff Thomson, which put the latter out of action that summer. Turner made 82 and 5 for the second test and 0 and 11 for the third.

Turner was picked on the New Zealand tour. He was going to delay his departure to be with his wife when their son was born. However Turner changed his mind. He later said "There's always the danger that if I arrive late, somebody will get 100 and take my test position."

Against New Zealand he made 3 and 20 and 30 and 20.

Turner was dropped from the Australian team at the end of the 1976-77 summer, missing selection for the Centenary Test. "We had three openers: myself, Rick McCosker and Ian Davis, and the selectors wanted to find room for David Hookes in the middle order," he said. "While we were in New Zealand, Hookes had scored five consecutive Sheffield Shield centuries. That demanded his selection for the Centenary Test."

On the first day of the Centenary Test, Rick McCosker's jaw was broken and the Australian batting collapsed. It was unsure if the Test would last five days and the Queen was meant to attend on day five. If the match finished early they planned to play a one-day game; Turner was asked to bring his gear to Melbourne as McCosker's replacement. However the game ended up going for five days.

Turner also missed selection on the 1977 Ashes.

=== World Series Cricket ===
Turner was offered the chance to join World Series Cricket. He turned it down after he found the matches would be played in opposition to the Australian Cricket Board matches that were being sponsored by his employer, British American Tobacco. "I felt I couldn't turn my back on a company that had supported me in cricket for nearly ten years, and by then I wasn't really enjoying playing cricket for a living," said Turner.

As an experienced test batsman, Turner was considered a strong chance to play for the "establishment" Australian team that summer against India. However he suffered a poor run of form. Turner decided to retire at the end of the summer, aged only 27. "I was trying my guts out this season", he said at the time. "I really was, but things just didn't go my way... I have not gained ground in any direction in the past 12 months. I have been static in my cricket. So I decided to get out now to give some other younger bloke a go in an atmosphere without pressure. I don't want people saying I'm like a rat deserting a sinking ship. Believe me, the ship has sunk".

== Post cricket career ==
Turner continued playing grade cricket for Randwick and was president of the club from 1977 to 1988. From 1986 to 1996 he served on the board of NSW Cricket. During this time he managed sponsorships for Benson & Hedges, including Australian cricket. He was chairman of Benson and Hedges from 1991 to 1994.

== See also ==
- List of New South Wales representative cricketers

Preceded by Ian Chappell	Highest Score by an Australian in ODI Cricket; 101 v Sri Lanka at The Oval 1975	Succeeded by Greg Chappell
