= Gary Gilmour =

Australian cricketer (1951–2014)

Personal information
- Full name: Gary John Gilmour
- Born: 26 June 1951; Waratah, New South Wales
- Died: 10 June 2014 (aged 62); Sydney
- Batting: Left-handed
- Bowling: Left-arm fast-medium
- Role: All-rounder

International information
- National side: Australia
- Test debut (cap 267): 29 December 1973 v New Zealand
- Last Test: 12 March 1977 v England
- ODI debut (cap 22): 30 March 1974 v New Zealand
- Last ODI: 20 December 1975 v West Indies

Domestic team information
- Years: Team
- 1971/72–1979/80: New South Wales

Career statistics
Competition	Test	ODI	FC	LA
Matches	15	5	75	19
Runs scored	483	42	3,126	182
Batting average	23.00	42.00	30.64	14.00
100s/50s	1/3	0/0	5/18	0/0
Top score	101	28*	122	44
Balls bowled	2,661	320	13,830	1,046
Wickets	54	16	233	29
Bowling average	26.03	10.31	31.52	22.34
5 wickets in innings	3	2	6	2
10 wickets in match	0	0	0	0
Best bowling	6/85	6/14	6/85	6/14
Catches/stumpings	12/–	2/–	68/–	4/–
Medal record
Men's Cricket
Representing Australia
ICC Cricket World Cup
Runner-up	1975 England
- Source: ESPNcricinfo, 12 June 2014

Gary John Gilmour (26 June 1951 – 10 June 2014) was an Australian cricketer who played in 15 test matches and five One Day Internationals (ODIs) between 1973 and 1977. He was a part of the Australian squad that finished as runners-up at the 1975 Cricket World Cup.

Gilmour showed early promise as a schoolboy. He was selected to play club cricket for Newcastle as a teenager and, aged 16, he played for Northern New South Wales against New Zealand, and was picked in the Australian Schoolboys team to tour the West Indies. Gilmour made his first-class debut in 1971. By the 1972–73 season, he started to be talked about as an international prospect. A breakout 1973–74 season saw him picked in the Australian side for the first test. On debut, he scored 52 not out off 58 balls and took 4–75. This was followed by a 7 wicket haul in the third test at Auckland, to set up a series-tying victory. He also won man of the match award for the first ODI.

A good domestic summer in 1974–75 earned him selection on the 1975 tour of England. In the semi-final of the 1975 World Cup against England at Headingley, Gilmour finished 6 for 14, and Australia bowled out the opposition for 93. It was the first time that a bowler had taken 6 wickets in an ODI, and remained the best ODI bowling performance until 1983. Gilmour's best season, however, was in 1975–76. The remainder of his career was plagued by injury. After his omission from the 1977 Australian tour of England, he played World Series Cricket for the 1977–78 and 1978-79 summers. He toured the West Indies in 1978 with the Australian World Series team but, following the end of World Series Cricket, Gilmour only played two more first-class games for New South Wales although he continued to play club cricket. A heel injury, however, brought an early end to his 1980–81 season and he retired soon after. In 2009, he was appointed manager of the Newcastle representative cricket team.

At the peak of his career, Gilmour combined "talented hitting" with a "penetrative" left-arm swing bowling and slip catching. He earned comparisons to the Australian all-rounder Alan Davidson. He was called "Newcastle's greatest all-rounder and arguably its greatest cricketer".

== Early life and education ==
Gary John Gilmour was born on 26 June 1951, in Waratah, Newcastle. He attended Waratah Primary School and Newcastle Boys High School. As a schoolboy, he was awarded two sporting "blues" by the New South Wales Combined High Schools Sports Association, one in 1967 for baseball and another in 1969 for cricket.

Gilmour was selected to play club cricket for Newcastle while he was a teenager. At the age of 16, he was picked for Northern New South Wales against New Zealand and took 5–70 for Newcastle against Metropolitan when he was only 17. He was picked in the Australian Schoolboys team to tour the West Indies in 1969–70 and in 1970–71 he was selected in the State Colts team. In 1969 he hit 58 runs in 52 minutes for Northern New South Wales against the West Indies, causing Gary Sobers to predict Gilmour would play test cricket.

== First-class cricket ==
Gilmour made his first-class debut in 1971 and was selected in the New South Wales team to play South Australia in January 1972. This came after a Colts game where Gilmour took 4-38 and hit 106 in 83 minutes. Alan Davidson said "Gary reminds me very much of myself. He is a far better batsman than I ever was but he is not as quick in the bowling. I regard him as a very useful bowler, an explosive batsman and he is capable of brilliant things in the field. I don't think there is any limit to this player's ability. He could be anything, provided he applies himself." In his first game Gilmour scored 122 in New South Wales' second innings. The Age declared "Gilmour announced to the world at large that a new personality player had arrived... Have we had the unbelievable luck to produe another Alan Davidson-type player so soon?"

His third match, against South Australia, saw him take 4–69 in South Australia's second innings. In 1972–73 season, he took five wickets against Victoria and five wickets plus an innings of 73 against Queensland. People began to discuss him as an international prospect. In the 1973–74 season, he had five and seven wicket hauls against Western Australia and had six wickets and 59 runs against SA. A good all round performance for New South Wales against the touring New Zealand team helped his cause, taking seven wickets and making a score of 54. He was picked in the Australian side for the first test.

=== Test debut ===
Gilmour made his test debut against New Zealand. During the match, he scored 52 not out off 58 balls and took 4–75. He only bowled three overs in the second innings as Australia's spinners took the bulk of the wickets; New Zealand only made 200. Gilmour found things slightly tougher in the second test. Gilmour was made twelfth man for the third test so the Australian selectors could trial other bowlers. Peter McFarline in The Age wrote that Gilmour might be at risk of missing the squad to tour New Zealand despite having then taken 44 first class wickets because he "has developed such a lacksidasical attitude to the game" and the selectors were "keen to make Gilmour realise that it takes more than natural ability to make a good test cricketer."

However, he did make the squad . He took first class 45 wickets at 31 for the summer – this would be Gilmour's highest ever aggregate.

In 1974 on the New Zealand tour, Gilmour was made twelfth man for the first two tests. A six wicket haul against the provincial Otago, saw him back in the eleven for the third test. He took 7 wickets in a Test at Auckland, which included 5 for 64 in the first innings to set up a series-tying victory. He also won the man of the match award for the first ODI, taking 2–19 off 7 overs. Gilmour took 20 first class wickets on the tour at an average of just 15.

=== 1974-75: World Cup ===
The 1974–75 competition for fast bowling places in the Australian team was intense due to the excellent form of Max Walker, Dennis Lillee and Jeff Thomson, and Gilmour wasn't selected for the 1974–75 Ashes series. However, he had a good domestic summer against interstate teams. These efforts – 31 Shield wickets at 30 – and his all round ability earned him selection on the 1975 tour of England.

Gilmour was twelfth man in the early stages of the tournament but was selected for the semi-final against England at Headingley. On a day almost tailor-made for his style of bowling, he finished 12 overs with 6 for 14 and Australia bowled out the opposition for 93. It was the first time that a bowler had taken 6 wickets in an ODI, and remained the best ODI bowling performance until Winston Davis claimed 7–51 in the 1983 competition. Although Australia lost the final to West Indies, Gilmour bagged 5–48 and scored 14 off 11 balls.

=== 1975 Ashes ===
Gilmour made a brief appearance at the 197 Ashes. He was called on at Headingley, replacing Alan Turner. He bagged 6 for 85 in the first innings in a game that was famously called off because protestors vandalised the pitch.

In September 1975 Ian Chappell declared "I'm now convinced that Gary Gilmour is ready for test cricket... I can how see him forcing his way into the Australian side as an all rounder. There's no reason at all why he can't secure a place as No. 6 or 7 batsman to complement his bowling. If I was Gary Gilmour I'd concentrate on making a few big scores early in the season."

=== 1975–76: career peak ===
Gilmour's best season was in 1975–76. He started well, taking 5–75 and scoring 40 for NSW against Queensland. He followed this with scores of 65 and 75 and three wickets against WA (Kim Hughes's first-class debut). He scored 74 against South Australia and took three wickets for NSW against the touring West Indians.

Gilmour was picked in the Australian side for the first test and second tests against the West Indies and one ODI.

An injury to Dennis Lillee saw Gilmour back in the side for the fourth test. In the fifth test, Gilmour hit 95 off 94 balls in Australia's first innings and got a duck in the second; he took 2–37 and 3–44 with the ball. In the sixth test, he took 5–34 in the West Indies first innings, helping set up another Australian victory.

He finished the series with 20 wickets at 20.3. He finished the summer with 104 for NSW against Victoria and 80 against South Australia. That summer was his best with the bat, making 708 runs at 37. He also took 39 first class wickets at 30.

=== 1976 tour of South Africa ===
Gilmour toured South Africa in 1976 with an International Wanderers side managed by Richie Benaud. In first game against the South African XI, Gilmour came in to bat at number 11 and proceeded to hit 80 runs in 64 minutes for a partnership of 96 with Alan Hurst, enabling the Wanderers to win the game.

=== 1976–77: decline ===
Gilmour's form dropped off sharply the following summer. He struggled to get wickets in early-season games. Although did take seven wickets in a game against Queensland.

He was chosen for the first test against Pakistan but required a runner during the game due to an injured ankle. He took 1–55 and 1–67 and scored 5 and 3.Jeff Thomson was injured in the game, so Gilmour kept his place for the second test, taking 2–78 and 1–19. In the third test, he took 3–81, making it 8 wickets in 3 Tests at 37.5. Later it was revealed that Gilmour had been bowling all summer with a bone "the size of a five-cent piece" floating around his heel.

Gilmour's weight also led to him coming in for criticism. He would later tell the story of Don Bradman informing him that "If I was a selector you'd never play for Australia. You eat too many potatoes."

=== 1977 tour of New Zealand ===
A brief tour to New Zealand followed, on which it became clear that Gilmour was struggling with a leg injury. He scored 44 in an early tour one day game, but performed poorly with the ball, taking 0–56.

In the first test, Gilmour hit his only Test century, 101 in 146 balls and 187 minutes, combining with Doug Walters for an Australian record seventh-wicket partnership of 217. About his performance, Greg Chappell said "I can't think of a better Gilmour innings for Australia... I know a lot of people thought he should be dropped, but that innings showed why he can't." However, he took 0–48 and 1–48 with the ball and also bowled poorly in the second test, although he did score 64 with the bat.

=== 1977 Centenary Test ===
Gilmour kept his place in the side for the Centenary Test at Melbourne in March 1977 but put up poor numbers. His form saw him omitted for selection on the 1977 Australian tour of England. However, he had an operation to remove the bone shortly afterwards.

== Later career ==
=== World Class Cricket ===
Gilmour signed to play World Series Cricket for the 1977–78 and 1978-79 summers but had a patchy career.

He began the 1978–79 season well with 5–20 in a warm-up game but was suspended for being "a bit overweight" on a tour of New Zealand. He was given a month to lose the weight and succeeded. Highlights of the 1978–79 summer included putting on 75 in 51 minutes with Ian Chappell in a one-day game and taking a hat trick in a one-day game against the West Indies.

He toured the West Indies in 1978 with the Australian World Series team.

=== Representative Cricket ===
Following the end of World Series Cricket, Gilmour only played two more first-class games for New South Wales.

He began the 1979–80 season well taking 5–35 and scoring 35 in a trial game. He was selected in the NSW side for the first Sheffield Shield game of the season, against WA. He took two catches and went for 0–93 and 1–11. He was dropped for the next game in favour of Richard Done.

Gilmour was recalled to play Tasmania in a McDonald's Cup one-day game. He played one more first-class game, against South Australia, taking 1–44 and 0–5. His first class career was over at the age of 27.

However, he continued to play for Belmont in Newcastle District Competition. In 1980–81 he scored 59 for Newcastle against the touring New Zealanders. A heel injury brought an early end to his summer. There was some talk Gilmour might return to NSW ranks in 1981–82 but it did not happen. He did score a 102 off 101 balls for Country Northern against Country Southern.

=== Manager ===
In 2009, Gilmour was appointed manager of the Newcastle representative cricket team.

== Personal life ==
Gilmour was married to wife, Helen, and together they had four children, Clint, Ben, Sam and Brooke. His three sons, Clint, Ben and Sam Gilmour, and his nephews, Mitch and Nathan Gilmour, all played cricket. His elder brother, Greg "Sleepy" Gilmour, played first-grade rugby union for Merewether-Carlton and Wanderers.

== Death ==
Gilmour suffered poor health in the last years of his life. He had a congenital narrowing of the main artery to the liver and underwent a liver transplant in 2005. His ill-health was later exacerbated by a fall. Gilmour died at Royal Prince Alfred Hospital in Sydney on 10 June 2014. He was 62. He had been predeceased by his son, Clint, who died of brain cancer aged 33 in March 2014.

Of Gilmour, his captain Ian Chappell said "He was at the front of the queue when they were handing out talent, but unfortunately he was right at the back of the queue when they handed out health and good luck".

== Awards and legacy ==
Gilmour was made a member of Waratah Primary School's Hall of Fame. In 2007, he was "named one of the best 30 players to have played one-day cricket for Australia". In 2010, the new training nets at Lugar Park, Kotara, were named in his honour.

== Appraisal ==
Teammate Kerry O'Keeffe said on Gilmour's death:

He wasn't a gregarious bloke, really. He was actually quite retiring, but he was always up for a bit of fun. He never seemed to take his cricket all that seriously, in that country way. Numbers didn't mean much to him. In a lot of respects, he had that 'Hookesy' outlook. Why would you get eight not out in 10 overs? He couldn't understand, what's the use of that? His record suggests unfulfilled talent and I guess that's what it was to a certain extent.

Another teammate, Steve Bernard said:

As a cricketer he was the most talented player of my time, a guy who had extraordinary talents in every facet of cricket. In hindsight, he probably didn't reach the heights that he should have, based on his cricket ability, but the guys who played with him and against him will recognise he was a fantastic player, who was dynamic in anything he did in cricket. When he was on he was unplayable. He bowled a swinging ball, he could hit the ball a mile, throw it like a bullet and he was a fantastic catcher either close to the wicket or in the outfield – a supreme cricketer. He was a very popular person, Gus, a bit of a larrikin and very much liked by everyone. He didn't take life all that seriously, played for the enjoyment of it.
