= Peter Hanlon (sportswriter) =

Australian sports writer and editor

Peter Hanlon is an Australian sports writer. As of 2012 he is deputy sports editor of The Age, for whom he has written since 1995.

He has also written for The Guardian, The Sun, The Times, The Sunday Times, Daily Express, and Today. With a focus largely on cricket, he has won "multiple" media awards in Victoria, including Cricket Victoria's leading media award for his 2009 Why Cricket, the "most outstanding written, photographic, radio or television work relating to Victorian cricket".
