= Dennis Amiss =

English cricketer and administrator

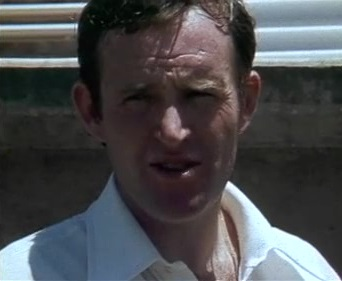
- Amiss in 1977

Personal information
- Full name: Dennis Leslie Amiss
- Born: 7 April 1943 (age 83); Harborne, Birmingham, Warwickshire, England
- Nickname: Sacker
- Height: 5 ft 11 in (1.80 m)
- Batting: Right-handed
- Bowling: Left arm medium Slow left arm orthodox

International information
- National side: England
- Test debut (cap 434): 18 August 1966 v West Indies
- Last Test: 12 July 1977 v Australia
- ODI debut (cap 12): 24 August 1972 v Australia
- Last ODI: 6 June 1977 v Australia

Domestic team information
- Years: Team
- 1960–1987: Warwickshire

Career statistics
Competition	Test	ODI	FC	LA
Matches	50	18	658	404
Runs scored	3,612	859	43,423	12,519
Batting average	46.30	47.72	42.86	35.06
100s/50s	11/11	4/1	102/212	15/77
Top score	262*	137	262*	137
Balls bowled	–	–	1,153	129
Wickets	–	–	18	2
Bowling average	–	–	39.88	62.50
5 wickets in innings	–	–	0	0
10 wickets in match	–	–	0	0
Best bowling	–	–	3/21	1/15
Catches/stumpings	24/–	2/–	417/–	105/–
- Source: Cricinfo, 28 October 2009

Dennis Leslie Amiss MBE (born 7 April 1943) is a former English cricketer and cricket administrator. He played for both Warwickshire and England. Amiss is known for scoring the first ever century in ODI history, which was also his debut match. A right-handed batsman, he was a stroke maker particularly through extra cover and midwicket – his two favourite areas to score runs. He was an accomplished batsman in all forms of the game. He averaged 42.86 in first-class, 35.06 in List-A, 46.30 in Tests and 47.72 in One Day Internationals. In first-class cricket he scored 102 centuries, and his England record amassed over 50 Tests ranks him with the best England has produced.

After retiring as a player in 1987, he served Warwickshire as Chairman of the Cricket Committee, and he followed David Heath as chief executive from 1994 until 2006. In 1992 he was selected as an England selector. In November 2007 he became the deputy chairman of the England and Wales Cricket Board; in August 2011, The Daily Telegraph described his role on the board as providing "cricketing knowledge and expertise [that] complemented Clarke’s business skills."

== Early years ==
Amiss was born at Harborne in Birmingham. He suffered a serious back injury whilst playing football in his teenage years, which entailed him starting each day of his sporting life undergoing stretching routines to loosen up.

== England career ==
Amiss made his Test debut for England in the fifth Test of the 1966 series with West Indies, and he proved an accomplished Test match batsman. He was one of the first batsmen to use a protective helmet. In scoring 3,612 Test runs, Amiss made eleven half-centuries and eleven centuries, including two double centuries against the West Indies. His highest Test match score, also his highest first-class score, was 262 not out against the West Indies in the 1973–74 Kingston Test, an innings that saved the Test match for England after they conceded a first innings lead of 230. The next highest score in England's innings was 38. After being dropped by England in 1975, he made a successful return against the West Indies at the Oval in the final Test of 1976, although his 203 in the first innings did not prevent England losing the match. Amiss's last Test came in 1977 when he was left out to make way for Geoff Boycott's return from self-imposed exile.

His former Warwickshire teammate, Jack Bannister, stated "Dennis was always tinkering with his game, he was a bigger perfectionist than Colin Cowdrey".

In One Day International cricket, Amiss scored 859 runs, including four centuries and one half-century. His top score of 137 against India in the 1975 World Cup was England's highest individual score in the World Cup until surpassed by Andrew Strauss in 2011, it remains England's fifth highest score in the tournament. He has the distinction of scoring the first ever One Day International century (103 in only the second One Day International on 24 August 1972) which is also the first instance of a debutant scoring a century in ODI. Amiss along with Keith Fletcher is also credited to have shared the first ever partnership of hundred runs in the same match. He ended with an ODI batting average of 47.72, which excepting those players to have played fewer than five times, remains the third highest of any England batsman who has completed his career.

Amiss played World Series Cricket in the late 1970s in Australia; during the 1978 World Series Cricket tournament, he became the first player to wear a batting helmet regularly.

Amiss was banned from international cricket for three years for taking part in the first 'rebel' tour of South Africa in 1982.

== Honours ==
Amiss was selected as one of the five Wisden Cricketers of the Year in 1975.

Amiss was awarded an MBE in 1988; in 2007 he received a Doctor of the university from the University of Birmingham.

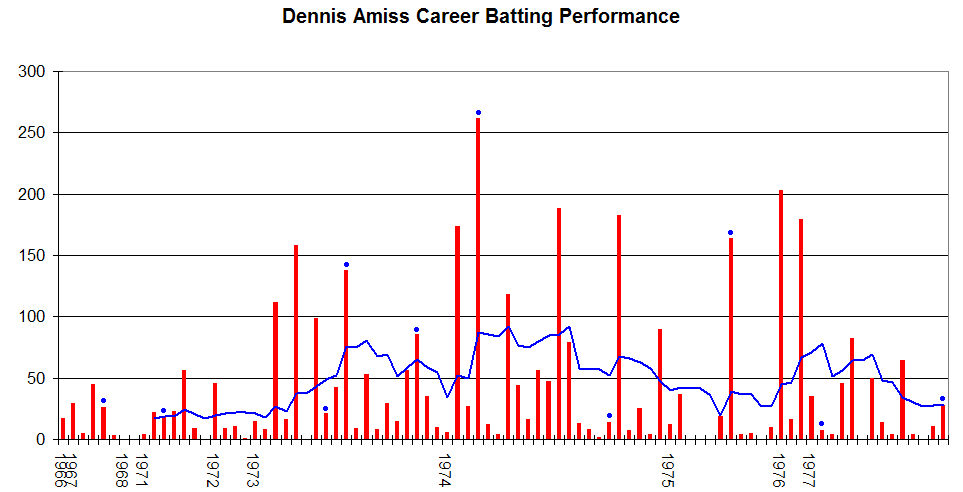
A graph of Dennis Amiss's Test performances.

== Records ==
Dennis Amiss is the first player in ODI cricket to have scored a century on both his debut and in his last match, the only other being Desmond Haynes. On 7 June 1975 at Lord's in the first match of the Prudential World Cup (which was also the very first Cricket World Cup to have been held) Amiss smashed 137 runs in just 147 balls against India powered by 18 boundaries. His innings provided enough leverage for England to post a very imposing and improbable target of 335 for India to be chased down within a span of 60 overs. It was also the first time that a team would score 300 or more runs in an ODI match. The match also featured the infamous and notorious ODI innings of Sunil Gavaskar who in reply to the nearly unreachable target set by England scored an unbeaten 36 in 174 balls with just one boundary to adorn his innings.

Others:

Amiss has shown gratitude to the Indian trio of Bishen Bedi, Venkatraghavan and Abid Ali who had bowled to him in practice which enabled Amiss to get adjusted to Indian condition, especially spin bowling. (Reference: Chapter 3, 'My Debt to Indians' - "In Search of Runs")

Dennis Amiss has written an Autobiography *In Search of Runs" in association with Michael Carey.
