= Keith Boyce =

West Indian cricketer (1943–1996)

Personal information
- Full name: Keith David Boyce
- Born: 11 October 1943; Castle, St Peter, Barbados
- Died: 11 October 1996 (aged 53); Speightstown, Barbados
- Batting: Right-handed
- Bowling: Right-arm fast-medium

International information
- National side: West Indies
- Test debut (cap 137): 19 March 1971 v India
- Last Test: 31 January 1976 v Australia
- ODI debut (cap 1): 5 September 1973 v England
- Last ODI: 20 December 1975 v Australia

Domestic team information
- Years: Team
- 1964–1975: Barbados
- 1966–1977: Essex

Career statistics
Competition	Tests	ODIs	FC	LA
Matches	21	8	285	165
Runs scored	657	57	8,800	2,441
Batting average	24.33	14.25	22.39	17.81
100s/50s	0/4	0/0	4/46	1/7
Top score	95*	34	147*	123
Balls bowled	3,501	470	44,087	7,841
Wickets	60	13	852	268
Bowling average	30.01	24.07	25.02	16.05
5 wickets in innings	2	0	35	3
10 wickets in match	1	0	7	0
Best bowling	6/77	4/50	9/61	8/26
Catches/stumpings	5/–	0/–	215/–	44/–
Medal record
Men's Cricket
Representing West Indies
ICC Cricket World Cup
Winner	1975 England
- Source: Cricket Archive, 17 October 2010

Keith David Boyce (11 October 1943 – 11 October 1996) was a cricketer who played 21 Tests and 8 One Day Internationals for the West Indies between 1971 and 1976. He was a member of the squad that won the 1975 Cricket World Cup.

Boyce was the first man to take eight wickets in a List A match; he achieved the feat when he took 8–26 for Essex against Lancashire in 1971. No other player dismissed eight batsmen in a one-day innings until Kent's Derek Underwood claimed 8–31 against Scotland sixteen years later.

Boyce's finest moment in Test cricket came in the First Test of the 1973 tour of England, when he scored 72, and took 5/70 and 6/77 in a 158-run victory. His highest Test score of 95 not out came in his penultimate Test, at Adelaide in January 1976.

Boyce had been recruited for Essex by Trevor Bailey. In the first innings of his Essex debut against Cambridge University in 1966 he took 9 for 61, which turned out to be the best bowling figures of his career. In that innings, Boyce's future West Indies teammate Deryck Murray scored 58 (not out) in the university's total of 127. Boyce's highest innings of 147 not out came against Hampshire at Ilford in 1969.

In 1974 Boyce was named one of the Wisden Cricketers of the Year. Following an injury, he returned to his home island of Barbados, where he suffered several personal setbacks. He was married twice, and had two daughters. He died from the effects of chronic cirrhosis of the liver, while sitting in a chair at a pharmacist's in Speightstown, Barbados, on his birthday on 11 October 1996.
