= Bernard Julien =

West Indian cricketer (1950–2025)

Personal information
- Full name: Bernard Denis Julien
- Born: 13 March 1950; Carenage, Trinidad and Tobago
- Died: 4 October 2025 (aged 75); Valsayn, Trinidad and Tobago
- Batting: Right-handed
- Bowling: Slow left-arm; Left-arm fast-medium
- Role: All-rounder

International information
- National side: West Indies
- Test debut (cap 148): 26 July 1973 v England
- Last Test: 18 March 1977 v Pakistan
- ODI debut (cap 6): 5 September 1973 v England
- Last ODI: 16 March 1977 v Pakistan

Domestic team information
- Years: Team
- 1968/69–1981/82: Trinidad and Tobago
- 1970–1977: Kent

Career statistics
| Competition | Test | ODI | FC | LA |
|---|---|---|---|---|
| Matches | 24 | 12 | 195 | 115 |
| Runs scored | 866 | 86 | 5,790 | 1,450 |
| Batting average | 30.92 | 14.33 | 24.53 | 18.35 |
| 100s/50s | 2/3 | 0/0 | 3/27 | 1/3 |
| Top score | 121 | 26* | 127 | 104 |
| Balls bowled | 4,542 | 778 | 29,025 | 5,450 |
| Wickets | 50 | 18 | 483 | 153 |
| Bowling average | 37.36 | 25.72 | 28.71 | 21.97 |
| 5 wickets in innings | 1 | 0 | 15 | 2 |
| 10 wickets in match | 0 | 0 | 1 | 0 |
| Best bowling | 5/57 | 4/20 | 9/97 | 5/21 |
| Catches/stumpings | 14/– | 4/– | 126/– | 28/– |
Medal record
Men's Cricket
Representing West Indies
ICC Cricket World Cup
| Winner | 1975 England |
- Source: ESPNcricinfo, 14 October 2025

Bernard Denis Julien (13 March 1950 – 4 October 2025) was a Trinidad and Tobago cricketer who played as an allrounder. As a right-handed batsman who bowled both left-arm pace and spin, Julien played in 24 Tests and 12 One Day Internationals for the West Indies; he was a noteworthy member of the 1975 World Cup winning squad. He played domestic cricket for Trinidad and Tobago and the English side Kent.

== Domestic career ==
Born in 1950, Julien was raised in the Trinidadian village of Carenage. He went on to attend St. Mary's College in his teenage years. As an allrounder who played as a right handed batsman who bowled left arm pace and spin, Julien eventually made his first class debut, at the age of 18, for South Trinidad against North Trinidad in the Beaumont Cup. A year later he played his first game for Trinidad and Tobago at the senior level. During the 1969–70 season he became a regular for the side in regional domestic competitions.

In 1970 Julien join English county cricket club Kent. He made his debut in 1970 and in 1972 was awarded with Kent's 152nd cap. Injuries and the occasional tour with the West Indies meant that he had only four full or mostly full seasons at Kent. In so doing he surpassed 400 first class runs and took over 40 wickets during each of those said seasons with the club.

== International career ==
In his third Test match Julien scored 121 from 127 deliveries, sharing a 150 run partnership with Garry Sobers, at Lord's during the 1973 tour of England. He was a member of the squad for the 1975 Cricket World Cup, taking 4 for 20 against Sri Lanka in a group match, and 4 for 27 against New Zealand in the semi final. During the final against Australia, he scored 26 not out from 27 balls, as the West Indies won the competition.

In 1977 he joined Kerry Packer's Australian based World Series Cricket tournament. Julien's international career came to an end after he joined the rebel tours to South Africa in 1982–83 and 1983–84, defying the international sporting boycott of the apartheid state.

== Personal life and death ==
When his playing days came to a close, Julien worked for Trinidad and Tobago's Ministry of Sports and embarked upon a coaching career. In 2005, he was diagnosed with throat cancer but later made a full recovery. Julien died in Valsayn on 4 October 2025, at the age of 75.
