= Roy Fredericks =

West Indian cricketer

Personal information
- Full name: Roy Clifton Fredericks
- Born: 11 November 1942; Blairmont, West Bank Berbice, British Guiana
- Died: 5 September 2000 (aged 57); New York City, United States
- Batting: Left-handed
- Bowling: Slow left-arm wrist spin
- Relatives: 3 daughters and 1 son

International information
- National side: West Indies
- Test debut (cap 129): 26 December 1968 v Australia
- Last Test: 15 April 1977 v Pakistan
- ODI debut (cap 3): 5 September 1973 v England
- Last ODI: 16 March 1977 v Pakistan

Domestic team information
- Years: Team
- 1963–1983: Guyana
- 1971–1973: Glamorgan

Career statistics
Competition	Tests	ODIs	FC	LA
Matches	59	12	223	68
Runs scored	4,334	311	16,384	1,644
Batting average	42.49	25.91	45.89	24.17
100s/50s	8/26	1/1	40/80	2/9
Top score	169	105	250	119
Balls bowled	1,187	10	5,295	178
Wickets	7	2	75	7
Bowling average	78.28	5.00	37.94	16.57
5 wickets in innings	0	0	0	0
10 wickets in match	0	0	0	0
Best bowling	1/12	2/10	4/36	3/5
Catches/stumpings	62/–	4/–	177/–	33/–
Medal record
Men's Cricket
Representing West Indies
ICC Cricket World Cup
Winner	1975 England
- Source: Cricket Archive, 17 October 2010

Roy Clifton Fredericks (11 November 1942 – 5 September 2000) was a West Indian cricketer who played Test cricket from 1968 to 1977. He was a member of the squad which won the 1975 Cricket World Cup.

He was an opening batsman for the West Indies in both Test cricket and one day cricket, and made 4334 Test runs in a career spanning only nine years. ODIs were infrequent in Fredericks' time, and consequently he only appeared in 12 matches, making 311 runs.

At the first-class level, he represented Glamorgan Cricket Club in English domestic cricket and British Guiana and Guyana. He had a number of opening partners in the Test team before establishing a successful partnership with Gordon Greenidge in the mid-1970s. He was an aggressive batsman who liked to counterattack fast bowlers, but also was capable as a traditional accumulator of runs.

His highest Test score was 169 against Australia at Perth in 1975–76. After Australia had been dismissed early on the second day, in 90 minutes batting before lunch the West Indies scored 130 for 1 off 14 eight-ball overs, and after lunch Fredericks reached his century off only 71 balls, at the time the quickest ever. The West Indies won the match by an innings.

In the inaugural ICC Cricket World Cup held in 1975, Fredericks became the first player in ODI history to be dismissed for being hit wicket and also became the first player to be dismissed for being hit wicket in World Cup history.

Fredericks was nicknamed Freddo by those who knew him. He was an all-round sportsman and represented his country, Guyana, also in table tennis and squash.

Fredericks was a Wisden Cricketer of the Year in 1974.

He was appointed Minister for Youth, Sport and Culture in Guyana in the Forbes Burnham regime.

== Death ==
In 1998, Fredericks underwent an operation for throat cancer. He returned to run cricket programmes for Guyana's Ministry of Youth, Sport and Culture, but had to go back to hospital.
