= Arthur Fagg =

English cricketer

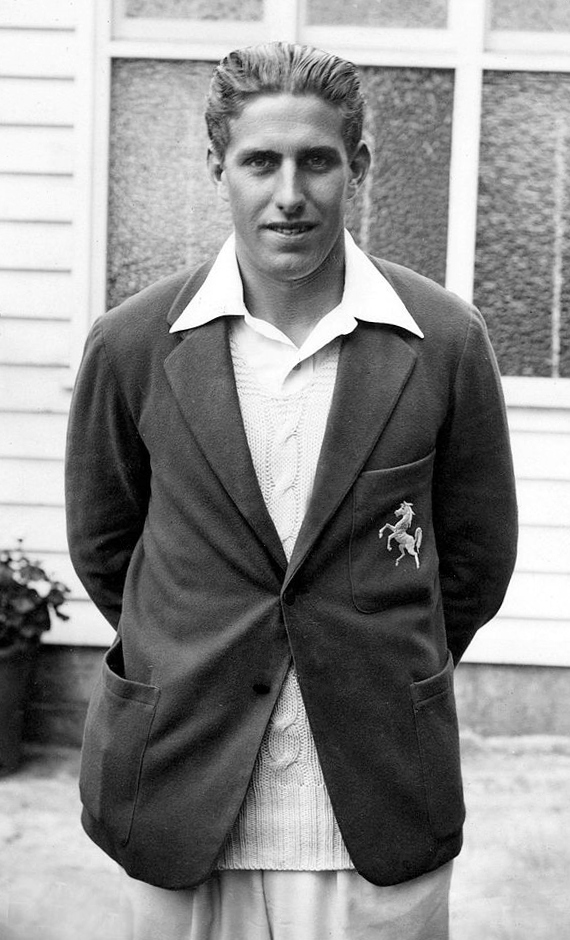
- Fagg in the 1930s

Personal information
- Full name: Arthur Edward Fagg
- Born: 18 June 1915; Chartham, Kent
- Died: 13 September 1977 (aged 62); Tunbridge Wells, Kent
- Batting: Right-handed
- Bowling: Right-arm medium
- Role: Batsman

International information
- National side: England
- Test debut (cap 291): 25 July 1936 v India
- Last Test: 22 July 1939 v West Indies

Domestic team information
- Years: Team
- 1932–1957: Kent

Umpiring information
- Tests umpired: 18 (1967–1975)
- ODIs umpired: 7 (1972–1976)

Career statistics
Competition	Test	First-class
Matches	5	435
Runs scored	150	27,291
Batting average	18.75	36.05
100s/50s	0/0	58/128
Top score	39	269*
Balls bowled	–	72
Wickets	–	0
Bowling average	–	–
5 wickets in innings	–	–
10 wickets in match	–	–
Best bowling	–	–
Catches/stumpings	5/–	425/7
- Source: CricInfo, 10 March 2017

Arthur Edward Fagg (18 June 1915 – 13 September 1977) was an English cricketer who played for Kent County Cricket Club and the English cricket team, and became an umpire after retiring as a player.

A right-handed opening batsman who first played for Kent at the age of 17, Fagg was a Test match player at 21 against India in 1936. He caught rheumatic fever on the tour of Australia the following winter, and missed the whole of the 1937 season.

There was strong evidence that Fagg was back to his best form in 1938. He set a first-class world record playing for Kent against Essex at Colchester, scoring 244 in the first innings and an undefeated 202 in the second innings in a drawn match, becoming the first batsman in first-class cricket history to score double centuries in both innings of a match. This feat was not equalled until 2019, when it was achieved in Sri Lankan domestic cricket by Angelo Perera. The 1938 season was a year of record-breaking, and the young Leonard Hutton cemented his place as England's first choice opener with his 364 against the Australians at The Oval.

Fagg played only one more Test, though he remained a consistent scorer in county cricket until the mid-1950s. In all, he scored 58 centuries and more than 25,000 runs.

After retirement, he became a cricket umpire, officiating in eighteen Test matches and seven One Day Internationals. In an incident at Edgbaston in 1973, he refused to take the field after the West Indies team disputed one of his decisions.

== See also ==
- List of Test cricket umpires
- List of One Day International cricket umpires
