= Tom Spencer (cricketer) =

London-born English cricketer

Personal information
- Full name: Thomas William Spencer
- Born: 22 March 1914; Deptford, London, England
- Died: 1 November 1995 (aged 81); Seaton Delaval, Northumberland, England
- Batting: Right-handed
- Bowling: Right-arm medium
- Role: Batsman

Domestic team information
- Years: Team
- 1935–1946: Kent
- FC debut: 4 September 1935 Kent v Essex
- Last FC: 7 August 1946 Kent v Somerset

Umpiring information
- Tests umpired: 17 (1954–1978)
- ODIs umpired: 6 (1972–1975)
- FC umpired: 701 (1950–1981)
- LA umpired: 193 (1950–1984)

Career statistics
Competition	First-class
Matches	76
Runs scored	2,152
Batting average	20.11
100s/50s	0/12
Top score	96
Balls bowled	30
Wickets	1
Bowling average	19.00
5 wickets in innings	0
10 wickets in match	0
Best bowling	1/19
Catches/stumpings	36/–
- Source: CricInfo, 17 December 2023

Tom Spencer
Personal information
- Position: Winger

Senior career*
Years	Team	Apps	(Gls)
–1933	Hastings & St Leonards		
1933	Bexhill		
1934–1936	Tunbridge Wells Rangers		
1936	Fulham	0	(0)
1936–1937	Lincoln City	4	(1)
1937–1938	Ashford		
1938–1939	Sittingbourne		
- * Club domestic league appearances and goals

Thomas William Spencer OBE (22 March 1914 – 1 November 1995) was an English first-class sportsman who played first-class cricket for Kent County Cricket Club and association football for Lincoln City in the Football League. He was later a notable cricket umpire who stood in 17 Test matches and six One Day Internationals.

== Cricket career ==
=== Playing ===
Spencer played 76 matches for Kent before and after World War II as an attacking batsman. His batting average was 20.11, he took one wicket for 19 runs from the five overs he bowled, and took 36 catches. Although Spencer won his County cap, his career was disrupted by World War II in which he served in the Royal Air Force.

=== Umpiring ===
At the suggestion of Frank Chester, Spencer joined the first-class umpire's list in 1950 and was appointed to his first Test in 1954. For reasons he never understood he had to wait 15 years before he was asked again. Years later he claimed to have been "a bit disgusted," but that he "was determined to plod on and become a bloody good county umpire." Spencer eventually stood in 17 Test matches, the last in 1978, and six One Day Internationals, including the first ODI at Lord's in 1972 and the first World Cup final in 1975. For the last 20 years until his retirement in 1980 he travelled to matches by train rather than car which he said allowed him to rest his eyes between appointments. In all, Spencer stood in a record 570 County Championship matches and 701 first-class fixtures, a total second only to Chester.

== Football career ==
Spencer was with his local club Hastings & St Leonards until September 1933 after which he had a short spell with Bexhill of the Sussex County League. He moved on to Southern League club Tunbridge Wells Rangers and then in July 1936 was signed by Second Division Club Fulham, but he did not make any league appearances for them. In November 1936 Spencer joined Lincoln City of Division 3 North and played in four league matches scoring one goal which he scored on 25 December 1936 against Rotherham United. From the 1937–38 season he returned to playing non-league football in the Kent League, firstly for a season with Ashford and then for the 1938–39 season with Sittingbourne.

== Personal life ==
Spencer was a natural sportsman. He claimed to have played four sports professionally, the other two being table tennis and boxing. After retiring from cricket he moved into professional coaching at Wrekin School and for many years he spent the northern winter coaching at St. Patrick's Christian Brothers' College, Kimberley in South Africa.

Spencer was appointed an Officer of the Order of the British Empire (OBE) in the 1976 Birthday Honours.

In later life he lived for many years in the North East. During June 1981 he wrote a series of historic career articles in the Newcastle based Sunday Sun newspaper. His death in 1995 was reported in his local media, but overlooked in the wider cricketing world. His obituary did not appear in Wisden or The Cricketer until 2003.

== Bibliography ==
- Carlaw, Derek (2020). Kent County Cricketers, A to Z: Part One (1806–1914) (PDF). Cardiff: ACS.
