= Keith Fletcher =

English cricketer

Keith Fletcher OBE
Personal information
- Full name: Keith William Robert Fletcher
- Born: 20 May 1944 (age 82); Worcester, Worcestershire, England
- Batting: Right-handed
- Bowling: Leg break

Career statistics
Competition	Test	ODI	FC	LA
Matches	59	24	730	428
Runs scored	3,272	757	37,665	9,948
Batting average	39.90	39.84	37.77	29.96
100s/50s	7/19	1/5	63/222	2/63
Top score	216	131	228*	131
Balls bowled	285	–	2,980	132
Wickets	2	–	51	4
Bowling average	96.50	–	45.01	27.75
5 wickets in innings	0	–	1	0
10 wickets in match	0	–	0	0
Best bowling	1/6	–	5/41	1/4
Catches/stumpings	54/–	4/–	644/–	133/–
- Source: CricInfo, 13 April 2022

Keith William Robert Fletcher OBE (born 20 May 1944) is an English former first-class cricketer who played for Essex and England. He later became England's team manager. His nickname was "The Gnome of Essex", so christened by his Essex teammate, Ray East, because Fletcher's winklepickers had begun to curl up at the toes due to wear.

Cricket writer Colin Bateman noted that "Fletcher was a tough cookie, a shrewd man who could bluff opponents like the most disarming of poker players. He evoked loyalty in his teammates and admiration from his opponents, even when they were beaten by the sucker punch". Bateman added "the sacking of Fletcher as England captain remains one of English cricket's shabbiest sagas".

Fletcher played 59 Test matches and 24 One Day Internationals. His Test tally of 3,272 runs came at an average of 39.90.

== Life and career ==
Keith started playing for his village team while living with his parents in Caldecote, Cambridgeshire, before moving to Royston, Hertfordshire to play for the local cricket club's second team at the age of 13. It was not long before he moved up to play for the first team.

It was while playing for Royston that Fletcher hit his first-ever century, and he produced his finest bowling figures, taking 9–20 on his first-team debut.

His county cricket career at Essex began at the age of 17. He toured Pakistan with the MCC Under-25 team in 1966–67, and made his England Test debut in 1968 at Headingley against Australia. A baptism of fire, he found hostility from the Yorkshire crowd who felt that Phil Sharpe should have been preferred, and Fletcher's experience was not helped by dropping regulation catches at slip. A first innings duck seemed to be the portent of his early introverted batting stints in the national team.

However, Fletcher was a Wisden Cricketer of the Year in 1974.

His debut century for England did not occur until Fletcher's 20th Test appearance. He went on to score six more centuries, at a rate of one every eight Tests, his highest Test score of 216 coming against New Zealand in 1975. His cricketing nous was used by both Tony Lewis and Tony Greig when they led the national team, but like many England batters of his era he struggled against Australia, and particularly in dealing with the bowling of Jeff Thomson and Dennis Lillee in 1974–5; he did make one Test centuries in that Ashes series, in the final test when Thomson and Lillee were incapacitated by injury. He was dropped by England after the Centenary Test of 1977, and not recalled for over four years. Following Mike Brearley's retirement as England captain and Ian Botham's short tenure, Fletcher re-appeared to captain the team to India in 1981–82. The series did not go well, with negative tactics from both teams, and poor umpiring decisions, which saw Fletcher flick off the bails with his bat after being given out in the Second Test. Worse was to follow for Fletcher when Geoffrey Boycott was sent home, and Fletcher's belated awareness that half of his touring party, led by his county teammate Graham Gooch, were preparing for a rebel tour to South Africa. Fletcher's captaincy of England saw a 1–0 series defeat over six Tests against India, before his only victory in a Test match as captain, in a one-off Test against Sri Lanka. Fletcher took all the blame, despite turning down the chance to join the rebels himself because of his loyalty to the England cause. He was then ignominiously sacked by the chairman of selectors, Peter May.

Fletcher also captained Essex successfully in two spells (1974–1985 and 1988). As Bateman noted, Fletcher "turned a county of cheerful losers into an even happier bunch as the most successful team in the country through the 1980s". He captained Essex to three County Championships, in 1979, 1983 and 1984. He was appointed an OBE in the 1985 New Year Honours.

From 1993 to 1995, Fletcher served as England team coach. During this period, the team played 26 Test matches, of which they lost 15 and won only five.

Later, Fletcher returned to Essex as first-team coach, stepping down in 2001, to be replaced by his former teammate Graham Gooch.

Sporting positions
Preceded by Mike Brearley	English national cricket captain 1981/2	Succeeded by Bob Willis
Preceded by Brian Taylor; Graham Gooch	Essex cricket captain 1974–1985; 1988	Succeeded by Graham Gooch; Graham Gooch
