= East African cricket team in England in 1972 =

A cricket team representing the East African countries of Kenya, Tanzania and Uganda toured England in the 1972 season as part of a drive to encourage the development of cricket in that part of Africa.

The 1972 touring team played 18 matches. Their opponents included the Marylebone Cricket Club and many first-class county teams, although none of the matches had first-class status. The tour helped East Africa to be invited to participate at the 1975 Cricket World Cup where they achieved temporary One Day International status.

== Team ==
Player	Year of Birth	Batting style	Bowling style	National team
Jawahir Shah (c)	1942	Right hand	–	Kenya
Zulfiqar Ali	1947	Right hand	Right arm medium	Kenya
Lawrence Fernandes	1945	Right hand	Leg break googly	Uganda
Duncan Kibaya	1949	Right hand	Right-arm off-break	Uganda
Anil Lakhani	1938	Unknown	Unknown	Kenya
Praful Mehta	1941	Left hand	Wicket-keeper	Tanzania
Raghuvir Patel	1944	Unknown	Wicket-keeper	Kenya
Upendra Patel	1942	Right hand	Right arm fast-medium	Uganda
Mehmood Quaraishy	1942	Right hand	–	Kenya
Harilal Shah	1943	Right hand	Right arm medium	Kenya
Jagoo Shah	1953	Unknown	Leg-break and googly	Kenya
Narendra Thakker	1945	Right hand	Wicket-keeper	Kenya
Charanjive Sharma	1946	Unknown	Unknown	Kenya
Vasant Tapu	1936	Left hand	Left arm fast-medium	Tanzania
Kishore Vasani	1939	Unknown	Slow left-arm orthodox	Uganda
Samuel Walusimbi	1948	Right hand	Left arm medium	Uganda

== Tour matches ==
The following matches were played during the tour:

5 June 1972

Sussex Second XI	v	East Africa

County Cricket Ground, Hove

7 June 1972

Surrey Second XI	v	East Africa

The Oval, London

9 June 1972

Sir FC Hawker's XI	v	East Africa

Lloyds Bank Sports Ground, Beckenham

10 June 1972

Indian Gymkhana	v	East Africa

Indian Gymkhana Cricket Club Ground, Osterley

12-13 June 1972
Scorecard

East Africa	v	Club Cricket Conference
255/6 dec. (64 overs); Jawahir Shah 91; Michael Dunn 3/53 (16 overs)		227/5 dec. (69 overs); N Virk 64; Anil Lakhani 2/37 (13 overs)
151 (46.2 overs); Upendra Patel 32; Michael Dunn 4/42 (10 overs)		144/8 (42 overs); 38 Michael Dunn; Upendra Patel 3/63 (21 overs)

Match drawn
New Malden Cricket Club Ground
Umpires: A.J. Fairs, J.H. Norton

- Toss not known

14 June 1972
Scorecard

Warwickshire	v	East Africa
244; Eddie Hemmings 79; Harilal Shah 4/66		128/8; Harilal Shah 41

Match drawn
Edgbaston, Birmingham

- Toss not known
- No play was possible on the second day

17 June 1972

Marylebone Cricket Club	v	East Africa

Lord's, London

18 June 1972
Scorecard

Cambridge University	v	East Africa
360 (81.1 overs); Majid Khan 222; Zulfiqar Ali 5/76 (22.1 overs)		278 (100.5 overs); Anil Lakhani 110; Keith Steele 4/33 (13 overs)
169 (49.5 overs); Peter Johnson 48; Lawrence Fernandes 7/40 (15.5 overs)		257/6 (71.4 overs); Jagoo Shah 85; Majid Khan 3/79 (18 overs)

East Africa won by 4 wickets
FP Fenner's Ground, Cambridge
Umpires: N.P. Knight and Ernest Basil Wye

- Cambridge University won the toss and decided to bat

21 June 1972

Worcestershire Second XI	v	East Africa

New Road, Worcester

24 June 1972

Hampshire Second XI	v	East Africa

County Ground, Southampton

29 June 1972
Scorecard

Leicestershire; 211/6 (50 overs)	v	East Africa; 198 (46.4 overs)
Jeffrey Tolchard 75; Vasant Tapu 2/12 (10 overs)		Charanjive Sharma 82; Robin Matthews 4/36 (9.4 overs)

Leicestershire won by 13 runs
Dog and Gun, Blaby
Umpires: W.E. Hickling, R. Julian

- Toss not known

3 July 1972
Scorecard

East Africa; 176/4d	v	Olton; 159/7
Vasant Tapu 52*; Ken Stanley 3/55		Mike Ellis 60; Vasant Tapu 2/22

Match drawn
Grange Road, Olton

- East Africa won the toss and decided to bat

4 July 1972

Universities Athletic Union	v	East Africa

Bulls Head Ground, Coventry

5 July 1972

Nottinghamshire	v	East Africa

Trent Bridge, Nottingham

6-7 July 1972
Scorecard

Derbyshire Second XI	v	East Africa
259/4 dec. (67 overs); Harold Cartwright 103*; Zulfiqar Ali 2/75 (24 overs)		244/7 dec. (68.5 overs); Zulfiqar Ali 69; Paul Marshall 4/54 (14 overs)
134/8 dec. (42 overs); Harold Cartwright 53; Upendra Patel 4/51 (20 overs)		129/9 (29 overs); Zulfiqar Ali 47; Phil Russell 4/29 (10 overs)

Match drawn
County Cricket Ground, Derby
Umpires: B.O. Meakin, L.A. Simpson

- East Africa won the toss and decided to field

8-9 July 1972
Scorecard

North Wales	v	East Africa
126; B. Hughes 30; Zulfiqar Ali 4/21		119/4 dec. Jawahir Shah 31*; J. Cooper 2/19
120; T.G. Jones 31; Vasant Tapu 4/29		130/4; Anil Lakhani 32; I Griffiths 3/59

East Africa won by 6 wickets
Penrhyn Avenue, Colwyn Bay
Umpires: F. Carnall, R. Griffiths

- North Wales won the toss and decided to bat

10-11 July 1972
Scorecard

Lancashire Second XI	v	East Africa
194/8 dec. (70 overs); John Sullivan 62; Harilal Shah 3/46 (17 overs)		108/3 dec. (41 overs); Jagoo Shah 57; John Abrahams 2/37 (10 overs)
98/2 dec. 3(1.5 overs); David Bailey 61*; Upendra Patel 2/24 (13 overs)		101/3 (33 overs); Charanjive Sharma 45*; John Savage 1/9 (8 overs)

Match drawn
Alexandra Meadows, Blackburn
Umpires: M. Ditchfield, D.L. Thomas

- Lancashire Second XI won the toss and decided to bat

13 July 1972

Somerset	v	East Africa

County Ground, Taunton

15-18 July 1972
Scorecard

Warwickshire	v	East Africa
376 (83.2 overs); Eddie Hemmings 72; Lawrence Fernandes 4/124 (29.2 overs)		175 (66.4 overs); Anil Lakhani 79; Bill Blenkiron 3/26 (15 overs)
185 (36.2 overs); Alvin Kallicharran 113; Upendra Patel 5/66 (18 overs)		100 (44 overs); Charanjive Sharma 33; Stephen Rouse 6/34 (15 overs)

Warwickshire won by 286 runs
Edgbaston, Birmingham
Umpires: D.G.L. Evans, C.G. Pepper

- Warwickshire won the toss and decided to bat

== Leading players ==
Kenyan Charanjive Sharma was the most consistent batsman, scoring 725 runs in 24 innings. Harilal Shah scored 680 runs in 23 innings and took 22 wickets in 159 overs. Zulfiqar Ahmed took 49 wickets for 308 runs. Jawahir Shah played several good innings and captained the side well.
