= List of Ugandan first-class cricketers =

Below is a list of Ugandan first-class cricketers. First-class cricket matches are those between international teams or the highest standard of domestic teams in which teams have two innings each. Generally, matches are eleven players a side but there have been exceptions. Today all matches must be scheduled to have at least three days duration; historically, matches were played to a finish with no pre-defined timespan.

The list is alphabetical ordered.

Name	Career Span	Matches	Teams
Akbar Baig	2004-2005	4	Uganda
Nehal Bibodi	2004-2005	2	Uganda
Charlie de Souza	1963-1964	1	East African Invitation XI
Peter de Souza	1963-1964	1	East African Invitation XI
Lawrence Fernandes	1967	1	East Africa
Emmanuel Isaneez	2004-2005	2	Uganda
Kenneth Kamyuka	2004-2005	4	Uganda
Salaudin Khan	1967	1	East Africa
Junior Kwebiha	2004-2005	3	Uganda
Ganda Lal	1963-1964	1	East African Invitation XI
Kishore Lalchani	1964	1	Coast Cricket Association XI
Keith Legesi	2004-2005	2	Uganda
Tendo Mbazzi	2004-2005	1	Uganda
Benjamin Musoke	2004-2005	4	Uganda
V. Narrotam	1963-1964	1	East African Invitation XI
Michael Ndiko	2004-2005	3	Uganda
Virani Noordin	1967	1	East Africa
Frank Nsubuga	2004-2005	4	Uganda
Richard Okia	2004-2005	2	Uganda
Joel Olwenyi	2004-2005	4	Uganda
Bhanu Patel	1967	1	East Africa
Nandikishore Patel	2004-2005	4	Uganda
Upendra Patel	1967	1	East Africa
Laurence Sematimba	2004-2005	3	Uganda
Kishore Vasani	1963-1967	3	East African Invitation XI, Coast Cricket Association XI, East Africa
Charles Waiswa	2004-2005	2	Uganda
Samuel Walusimbi	1973-1975	2	East Africa
