= India cricket team in East Africa in 1967 =

A cricket team from India toured East Africa in mid-1967 playing games against Kenya, Tanzania and Uganda as well as against other local teams. A match against the full East African team at the end of the tour was given first-class status.

== Tour matches ==
29-31 July 1967
scorecard

Uganda	v	Indians
146 (77.5 overs); Lawrence Fernandes 29; Rusi Surti 3/21 (9.5 overs)		273 (61.2 overs); Ramesh Saxena 85; Kishore Vasani 4/77 (16.2 overs)
254 (92 overs); Virani Noordin 96; B. S. Chandrasekhar 4/53 (21 overs)		130/4 (35 overs); Chandu Borde 54*; Lawrence Fernandes 1/11 (3 overs)

Indians won by 6 wickets
Lugogo Stadium, Kampala

- Uganda won the toss and decided to bat

5-7 August 1967
scorecard

Kenya	v	Indians
241 (95 overs); Jawahir Shah 96; Bishan Bedi 5/66 (32 overs)		425/2d (85 overs); Ajit Wadekar 179; Don Pringle 4/99 (28 overs)
277/7 (127 overs); Jawahir Shah 134; Sadanand Mohol 4/56 (27 overs)

Match drawn
Suleman Virjee Indian Gymkhana Ground, Nairobi

- Kenya won the toss and decided to bat

12-14 August 1967
scorecard

Indians	v	Tanzania
215 (74.4 overs); Budhi Kunderan 81; Vasant Tapu 4/35 (24 overs)		95 (42.1 overs); Praful Mehta 25; B. S. Chandrasekhar 8/25 (14.1 overs)
203/5d (37.3 overs); Ajit Wadekar 65; Ramnik Volumbia 1/10 (5 overs)		79/1 (22 overs); R. D. Patel 40*; Mansoor Ali Khan Pataudi 1/17 (4 overs)

Match drawn
Gymkhana Club Ground, Dar-es-Salaam

- Toss not known

17 August 1967
scorecard

Indian High Commissioner's XI; 226	v	Indians; 230/8
Jasmer Singh Grewal 57; B. S. Chandrasekhar 3/26		Mansoor Ali Khan Pataudi 98; Zulfiqar Ali 4/67

Indians won by 3 wickets
Nairobi

- Toss not known
- 12 players per side

19-21 August 1967
scorecard

East Africa	v	Indians
308 (110.4 overs); Upendra Patel 105; Sadanand Mohol 4/66 (25 overs)		386/9d (88 overs); Hanumant Singh 109; Vasant Tapu 5/72 (17 overs)
276 (102.4 overs); Anil Lakhani 58; R. D. Patel 58; B. S. Chandrasekhar 5/73 (22 overs)		199/2 (21.5 overs); Ajit Wadekar 86*; Vasant Tapu 1/45 (7 overs)

Indians won by 8 wickets
Lugogo Stadium, Kampala

- Indians won the toss and decided to field
