= John Hutton (cricketer) =

English cricketer

Personal information
- Full name: John Leonard Hutton
- Born: 6 May 1946 (age 80); Pudsey, Yorkshire, England
- Batting: Left-handed
- Bowling: Right-arm medium
- Relatives: Len Hutton (father); Richard Hutton (brother); Frank Dennis (uncle); Simon Dennis (cousin); Ben Hutton (nephew); Oliver Hutton (nephew)

Domestic team information
- Years: Team
- 1973/74: Marylebone Cricket Club

Career statistics
Competition	First-class
Matches	1
Runs scored	51
Batting average	25.50
100s/50s	–/–
Top score	39
Balls bowled	126
Wickets	2
Bowling average	23.50
5 wickets in innings	–
10 wickets in match	–
Best bowling	1/15
Catches/stumpings	–/–
- Source: Cricinfo, 9 August 2021

John Leonard Hutton (born 6 May 1946) is an English former first-class cricketer.

== Early life and career ==
Hutton was born to the Test cricketer and former England captain Len Hutton and his wife, Dorothy, at Pudsey in May 1946. He was educated at Repton School, captaining the school cricket team in 1964. Hutton played for the Yorkshire Second XI, but was unable to follow in the footsteps of his father and brother, Richard, who both played for Yorkshire at senior level. He toured East Africa with the Marylebone Cricket Club in 1973/74, playing a single first-class match against East Africa at Nairobi. He batted in both MCC innings, scoring 12 runs in their first innings before he was dismissed by Vasant Tapu and 39 runs in their second innings, before being dismissed by Zulfiqar Ali. With his right-arm medium pace bowling, he dismissed Jawahir Shah and Jagoo Shah in the East African first and second innings respectively to finish with match figures of 2 for 47. Alongside his brother, he unveiled a blue plaque in honour of his father and Herbert Sutcliffe at Pudsey St Lawrence Cricket Club in October 2016. His uncle Frank Dennis and nephew Ben Hutton both played in over fifty first-class matches.
