= Oliver Hutton =

English cricketer (born 1979)

Oliver Richard Hutton (born 27 May 1979) is a former cricketer. He played one first-class cricket match, for the Oxford University Centre of Cricketing Excellence against Surrey in 2004. He also played for Greece in the 2011 ICC European T20 Championship Division Two.

Hutton was born in Johannesburg, South Africa. His grandfather Sir Leonard Hutton and father Richard Hutton both played Test cricket for England. His other grandfather Ben Brocklehurst, uncle John Hutton, cousin Simon Dennis, great-uncle Frank Dennis, and elder brother Ben Hutton, all played first-class cricket.

He represented Middlesex 2nd XI, Richmond Cricket Club and the Oxford University Centre of Cricketing Excellence as a left-handed batsman and a right-arm medium-fast bowler.

He later became a shipping lawyer in Piraeus, Greece. He played four T20 matches for Greece in the 2011 ICC European T20 Championship Division Two in the Netherlands in 2011, scoring runs and taking wickets against Spain and Finland. He also played club cricket in Greece, playing for Vrillisia cricket club.
