= Bhanu Patel =

Ugandan cricketer

Personal information
- Full name: Bhanu Patel
- Born: Not known Uganda Protectorate
- Batting: Unknown
- Bowling: Unknown

Career statistics
Competition	First-class
Matches	1
Runs scored	0
Batting average	0.00
100s/50s	–/–
Top score	0
Balls bowled	192
Wickets	2
Bowling average	69.00
5 wickets in innings	–
10 wickets in match	–
Best bowling	2/113
Catches/stumpings	–/–
- Source: Cricinfo, 31 January 2022

Bhanu Patel (date of birth not known) is a Ugandan former first-class cricketer.

Patel was born in Uganda Protectorate. He made a single appearance in first-class cricket for the East Africa cricket team against the touring Indians at Kampala in 1967. Batting from the tail, he was dismissed in both East African innings without scoring by Sadanand Mohol and B. S. Chandrasekhar. With the ball, he took the wickets of E. A. S. Prasanna and the Nawab of Pataudi to finish with match figures of 2 for 138. Between 1957 and 1970, Patel also played minor matches for Uganda. It was noted in The History of Cricket in Uganda that he "imparted much influence on the popularity of the game" in Uganda.
