= Len Hutton as England captain =

Len Hutton was an English Test cricketer, who played for Yorkshire County Cricket Club and England in the years around the Second World War as an opening batsman. He was described by Wisden Cricketer's Almanack as one of the greatest batsmen in the history of cricket. In 1952, he became the first professional cricketer to be appointed permanent captain of England in a Test match at home, and the first anywhere in the 20th Century. Up until then, England captains were all amateurs; professionals were considered to be unsuitable captains because of their perceived social status and alleged difficulties for one professional to lead another. (The only exception was Jack Hobbs, who as a professional was temporarily appointed captain for the second and third days of the Fourth Test in 1926 when the regular captain, Arthur Carr, was taken ill).

Hutton won his first series against India and then led England against Australia in the Ashes, which England had not held since 1934. Amid great interest from the public, England won the series in the final match. Hutton then led England in a controversial tour of the West Indies, where local politics and the behaviour of players led to difficulties. Although the series was drawn and Hutton had great personal success, he faced criticism for the behaviour of his team. When he withdrew from cricket for a time in 1954, he was replaced as captain and influential members of the cricket establishment wanted to replace him as captain for the forthcoming tour of Australia. However, he retained the position and led England to a 3–1 victory that winter, after which he retired owing to ill health and mental exhaustion.

== Background ==
From the late nineteenth century, most captains were amateurs. Amateurs were usually from privileged backgrounds, while professionals were mainly from the working classes. Class distinctions pervaded cricket, which was organised and administered by former and current amateurs. They wished to preserve leadership roles for members of the Establishment, in defiance of broader social changes which had reduced their influence in other sports. Administrators reasoned that amateurs were better captains as they were free from worries over employment. The Wisden editor believed that "the professional may have difficulty in enforcing discipline. He would naturally hesitate to suggest to his committee that this player or that should be dropped, and so be instrumental in depriving the man in question of some part of his livelihood. Further, feeling that an error of judgment would prejudice his standing with the committee, he might well hesitate to take risks." In 1925, Lord Hawke, then the Yorkshire president, expressing his hope that an amateur would always be available to captain the national side, had made the impromptu comment, "Pray God, no professional shall ever captain England."

However, in the 1950s, it became difficult to find suitable choices as captain, and the press began to debate the merits of a professional taking the role. When Freddie Brown was a surprise choice as England captain in 1950, the professional Denis Compton was appointed as the vice-captain. However, as the tour progressed the press noticed that Brown consulted Hutton more frequently than Compton.

== Appointment ==
When Freddie Brown resigned from the captaincy of England at the end of 1951, the selectors were left with a difficult decision. England captains in all home Test matches, and in all 20th-century Tests, had been amateurs. In 1952, none of the amateur county captains were considered to be of a high enough standard to represent England in a Test, or were considered experienced enough to be captain. Norman Yardley was a possibility, as was Denis Compton. To solve the problem, the selectors chose Hutton, who became the first professional cricketer in the 20th century to captain England in a Test match. The press had anticipated the appointment, and Hutton had expressed a willingness to accept the captaincy, although he was unwilling to become an amateur, as Hammond had done before him. The editor of Wisden expressed his approval, writing: "In breaking with tradition and choosing a professional as captain the Selection Committee made a vital decision in the interests of England, because it should mean that in future no man will be picked as leader unless he is worth a place in the side." E. W. Swanton and the Yorkshire Post also approved of Hutton's appointment. The Times congratulated the selectors on their boldness, acknowledging that the step of a professional appointment would have been inevitable in the near future but could have been postponed. It also noted precedents such as the appointment of Hammond as captain, and expressed the hope that Hutton's batting would not be affected. Hutton publicly stated his delight, but was privately concerned about how the cricket establishment and M.C.C. members would receive him.

Hutton's first series as captain was against India, although England were far too strong for the tourists in this series. Hutton was only named as captain for the first Test, rather than the whole series, to the surprise of many commentators. The Wisden editor approved of his performance as captain, particularly in the improvement in the English fielding. The only reservation was over Hutton's cautious approach. His first Test was before his home crowd of Headingley, and the Wisden correspondent wrote: "For Hutton the match was a personal triumph. Tradition had been broken with his appointment as a professional captain of England and he must have known that the eyes of the world were upon him. He did not falter and his astute leadership earned him many admirers and, perhaps, guided future policy." England won by seven wickets, with Fred Trueman reducing India to none for four wickets on his debut. Hutton himself only scored ten runs in each innings. Hutton was more successful with the bat in the second Test, scoring 150 out of a total of 537, although he made a very slow start and possibly caused the other players to bat slowly. However, Wisden believed that England owed much to Hutton's tactics in the match in forcing a win, although it criticised his caution in letting the match go into a fifth day through slow batting in England's second innings. Following this match, the selectors appointed Hutton captain for the rest of the series. In the final two Tests, Hutton scored 104 and 86 and his bowlers dominated the Indian batsmen; the final Test was ruined by weather, but England won the four match series 3–0. In the series, Hutton scored 399 runs at an average of 79.80.

== Ashes victory ==
At the start of the 1953 season, England entered the summer facing a Test series against Australia, who had held the Ashes since 1934, captained by Lindsay Hassett. Critics considered that England had a good chance of regaining the Ashes following their form in 1952, but Australia remained confident, particularly after winning six of their first eight games by an innings (including a victory over Yorkshire). Once the Tests began, Hutton began well with scores of 43 and 60 not out in the drawn first Test. He had gone into the match with a cloud over his fitness following a shoulder injury, but top-scored in both innings. However, England's dismissal for just 144 in their first innings made Hutton doubtful about England's prospects for the series; only 14 wickets for Alec Bedser kept England in the match before rain came. Before the second Test, Hutton scored two fifties against the Australians for Yorkshire, but his fitness again came into question before the Test, this time with fibrositis. His movement was restricted while fielding, and he dropped three catches in Australia's first innings, injuring his thumb in the process. Despite these problems, Hutton scored 145 when he batted in England's first innings, reaching 2,000 Test runs against Australia in the process. He added 168 with Tom Graveney, batting with great freedom. Hutton shared another century stand with Compton, surviving a difficult spell with the new ball. Wisden said that the "sight of England batsmen giving free rein to their strokes brought undisguised delight to many who had bemoaned the lack of aggression in so much Test cricket. The spectacle was glorious to behold." The second innings was a different story, with Hutton dismissed early chasing a winnings total of 343, and it took a long stand between Willie Watson and Trevor Bailey to allow England to escape with a draw after a batting collapse.

At this point in the series, Hutton faced pressure from the press: journalists found fault with his caution, the positions in which he placed fielders and his use of bowlers. However, the selectors were also criticised for continuing to appoint Hutton as captain on a match-by-match basis instead of for the whole series. Hutton believed that they may have been looking unsuccessfully for an alternative captain. Hutton again faced fitness concerns going into the third Test, not declaring himself fit until just before the match. Rain prevented a result; Hutton scored 66, Wisden complementing his strokeplay, and earned praise for securing a psychological advantage in pressuring Australia on a turning pitch in their second innings, even though a result was out of the question. Finding the English spinners very difficult to play, Australia collapsed to 35 for eight before time ran out. After the match, the Australians came under pressure from press who began to search for reasons for the team's perceived poor performances. In contrast, Hutton was appointed captain for the rest of the series, as well as for the forthcoming M.C.C. winter tour of West Indies.

The fourth Test, in front of Hutton's home crowd, was Hutton's least successful of the series. Having been put into bat by Hassett, the first time an Australian captain had fielded first against England since 1909, Hutton was bowled second ball by a Yorker from Lindwall. England never recovered, batting very slowly to score 167 and after the first innings, Australia led by 99 with three days left. Hutton scored only 25 in the second innings but England batted for a long time, assisted by rain, leaving Australia 177 in 115 minutes to win the game. The tourists were winning easily when Hutton asked Bailey to use the negative tactic of leg theory, bowling wide of leg stump to make it hard to score runs, while using a long run-up to waste time. Only twelve overs were bowled in the last 45 minutes, then considered slow, Australia lost a wicket and the tactics resulted in Australia being 30 short of their target when the game ended. Wisden noted that only a defensive policy had prevented England losing. Hutton was criticised for negativity by the Australian press, but Bill Bowes wrote that the gravity of the situation justified Hutton's tactics.

With the press noting parallels between the current series and England's win at the Oval in 1926, the deciding Test began amid great interest from the public. Hutton lost his fifth successive toss in the series but England had their most balanced attack of the series with the recall of Trueman, whom Hutton used in short bursts to take four wickets in Australia's first innings of 275. Surviving an early scare when a bouncer from Lindwall nearly knocked his cap onto his wickets, Hutton scored 82, but England only managed a narrow first innings lead. In their reply, Australia collapsed before the England spinners, for which Wisden gave the credit to Hutton, both for realising that the pitch favoured spin and barely using his pace bowlers, and for some of his tactical decisions in the innings. Although Hutton was run out early in England's pursuit of 132 to win the Ashes, the remaining batsmen took England to their first series win against Australia since 1932–33 and their first home series win since 1926. Hutton was widely acclaimed after the series, particularly for the good spirit which he and Hassett maintained. Norman Preston wrote in Wisden, "To my mind not sufficient credit was given to Hutton last summer for his part in lifting England out of the long period of depression ... [He] led his men conscientiously against Australia and, in addition, he shouldered the main responsibility of the batting. He scored nearly 100 runs more than any other player on either side ... His 145 [at Lord's] was easily the finest innings of the whole series. Moreover, Hutton then showed the enterprise we expected..." In the series, he scored 443 runs at an average of 55.37. Hutton ended the summer with another century against the Australians at the Scarborough Festival. However, he had felt the strain of leading England that summer, with some at Yorkshire feeling that he relaxed too much to improve discipline at the county, despite his batting successes.

== Captain in the West Indies ==
In the following winter of 1953–54, Hutton led M.C.C. on a controversial tour of West Indies, becoming the first professional captain of England on a tour in the twentieth century. His appointment as captain had been queried at home by those who believed that a professional might captain at home but would be unsuitable to lead a tour. Hutton also encountered problems as the touring party was being selected. Usually, M.C.C. tours had experienced managers; Hutton had expressed a preference for Billy Griffith, the assistant secretary to the M.C.C. who had toured West Indies as a player in 1947–48. The M.C.C. decided that Griffith could not be spared from his duties. Instead, they appointed Charles Palmer, the captain of Leicestershire, as a player-manager, despite his inexperience in the role as manager and player—he had not played Test cricket at the time. This appointment caused authority on the tour to become muddled as Palmer was tour manager for most of the time, with authority over the captain, but a player for the rest of the time, under the captain's orders. Nor did Palmer have the experience nor temperament for such a difficult position, according to Alan Gibson, while E. W. Swanton described the appointment of Palmer by the M.C.C. as one of the worst it ever made. Hutton also struggled to lead some of the senior professionals on the tour, feeling uncomfortable giving orders to fellow professionals, particularly as some, such as Godfrey Evans, were unco-operative at first, and he found Trueman difficult to handle.

Off field events often overshadowed the cricket. The tour took place while the major territories in the region had growing movements for independence from Britain, which clashed with the British government's plans to establish a West Indies Federation. The resulting friction affected the tour. Before setting off, the cricketers were briefed about the political situation in the West Indies and Hutton believed that the team was being used as a political instrument to support colonial rule. In cricketing terms, the series was being viewed by some journalists as deciding the world champions of cricket, which Wisden's correspondent viewed as increasing the tension before the tour began, as did "the constant emphasis upon victory which the M.C.C. players found to be stressed by English residents in the West Indies." The tourists believed that standards among the umpires were low, particularly when pressure from the home crowds, including the threat of violence, made them reluctant to give decisions against the West Indian players. Hutton protested about the appointment of two particular umpires, but the West Indies board insisted that each match had to be umpired by men from the island on which it was held. In several matches, the crowds made noisy protests against events on the field, usually related to umpiring decisions, but also against the West Indian captain Jeff Stollmeyer. During the first Test, the family of an umpire were attacked after he gave out John Holt six runs short of a hundred. The climax came in the third Test where, following the umpire's ruling of Cliff McWatt as run out, bottles and other missiles were thrown onto the outfield. Hutton managed to keep his side and the umpires on the field, possibly defusing a dangerous situation. There were other diplomatic incidents involving England players. In Barbados, some of the team were alleged to have shown a lack of courtesy to a group of women, but were publicly backed by Hutton and Palmer. In Jamaica, Hutton was accused of insulting the Chief Minister, whom Hutton had not stopped to speak to while coming into the pavilion during a break in his innings. Hutton said that he had not recognised the minister, nor been aware of his attendance at the match, and apologised for any offence caused. Also, some of the reactions of players to events on the field further inflamed feelings, as did the behaviour of some individuals, Trueman in particular. Some critics held Hutton responsible for the perceived lack of sportsmanship by the M.C.C. players, as they felt he should have brought Trueman and other younger tourists under closer control. However, the editor of Wisden later wrote: "[Hutton] was involved in the most thankless task any cricket captain has undertaken when he went to West Indies. Instead of finding a friendly cricket atmosphere he and his players were subjected to the impact of deep political and racial feeling—an experience all of them wish to forget. A few members of the team did not hide their innermost feelings, with the result that Hutton came under severe criticism, although his behaviour was blameless."

The tour itself began uneventfully, although Hutton was dismissed by his first ball of the tour, in a warm up match against Bermuda. The first-class matches began in Jamaica; the M.C.C. team inflicted only the third defeat on Jamaica by a touring side in the first game (Hutton had played in another when Yorkshire won a match on their 1936 tour) and he second was drawn. As the Test series began, Hutton wanted to exploit what he saw as a West Indian weakness against pace which had been exploited by Australia in 1951–52; he picked four fast bowlers but had misread the pitch, which played very slowly. West Indies were able to build up a big score before England collapsed to the West Indies spinners. Stollmeyer batted again, receiving abuse from the crowd for not enforcing the follow-on, and set a target of 457 to win. Although Hutton believed that the target was achievable on the easy batting pitch, England's batsmen again failed, losing by 140 runs. Both captains employed time-wasting tactics in the match, and used negative leg theory bowling, outside leg stump. Hutton himself scored 24 and 56; in the second Test, he scored 72 and 77 but could not prevent another loss. He had lost his seventh consecutive toss in Tests and despite the loss of early wickets, West Indies scored 383. Wisden criticised Hutton for not placing fielders on the boundary to cut off runs. In reply, England batted very slowly, batting nearly 160 overs for a score of 181; Wisden believed that Hutton was weighed down by responsibility, batting for four and a half hours before being caught from a desperate attacking shot, possibly affected by barracking from the crowd. West Indies batted again and set a target of 495. England were bowled out for 313 to lose by 181 runs.

The third Test was won by England by nine wickets, their first victory in the Caribbean since 1935. Hutton, who won the toss for the first time in eight matches, scored 169 in seven hours through concentrating on defence and England's bowlers were able to bowl out West Indies twice. The British press praised Hutton's batting and handling of the tension during the match and the M.C.C. secretary sent a telegram of congratulations to Hutton for his contributions. As the fourth Test was drawn in very easy batting conditions, England had to win the final Test to draw the series. Hutton lost the toss but Trevor Bailey produced his best bowling figures in Tests to bowl out West Indies cheaply in good batting conditions. Hutton then batted for almost nine hours to score 205, his nineteenth and final Test century, increasing his scoring rate after a cautious beginning by the whole team. Previously, no England captain had scored a double century while on tour. Wisden observed that "For concentration and control, Hutton's innings ... scarcely could have been excelled." England's bowlers again bowled out West Indies and England scored the required runs to record a series-levelling nine-wicket victory, West Indies' first defeat in Jamaica in a Test.

Wisden's verdict on Hutton's series was that he showed mastery of every bowler and stood apart from everyone else. He also displayed some excellent attacking shots. The correspondent wrote, "From first to last no batsman compared with Hutton ... Considering the weight of his many responsibilities and worries, Hutton played magnificent cricket..." Many England players later praised Hutton's captaincy and performances on the tour, while the press were generally supportive with a few reservations about his caution. Swanton later wrote that England's recovery to level the series was due to Hutton, who "[drained] himself to the furthest point of nervous and physical exhaustion ... If it was not a happy tour, much was redeemed by its ending." In five Tests, he scored 677 runs, his highest in a series, at an average of 96.71, the highest on either side. Alan Gibson describes the tour as "the bravest effort of his career", crediting him for England's recovery from two games down to level the series.

== Captaincy manoeuvres ==
Writing in Wisden, Norman Preston claimed that reservations about Hutton's captaincy led to "behind the scenes moves to deprive Hutton of his highest ambition—captaincy of M.C.C. in Australia." Hutton's appearances were limited in the 1954 season, missing several matches in the early part of the summer due to neuritis caused by the winter tour. He played in the drawn first Test, Pakistan's inaugural match, but scored a duck in his only innings. Suffering from mental exhaustion and physically unwell, Hutton subsequently missed a month of cricket on medical advice and the selectors appointed the amateur David Sheppard as England captain in his place. Speculation grew in the press that Hutton would surrender the captaincy and that Sheppard, a theology student at the time, was the favoured candidate of the selectors. Sheppard's main supporters were Walter Robins, a selector, and Errol Holmes, a former skipper of Surrey. They pressured Sheppard into putting his name forward to the M.C.C. secretary Ronnie Aird, while the press wanted to know his intentions. He indicated that he could take a leave of absence from his studies if necessary. Meanwhile, Hutton told the M.C.C. that he would go to Australia as captain or player if required. Sheppard captained England in the second and third Tests against Pakistan, winning both matches without particularly distinguishing himself. The press supported Hutton, running stories about the prejudice against professionals among the M.C.C., but neither Hutton nor Sheppard publicly expressed an opinion. Robins, seeing the strength of opinion on the matter, backed down. As Hutton returned to cricket in July, scoring two centuries, he was appointed captain of the M.C.C. for the winter tour. Wisden claimed in 1955 that the selectors only chose Hutton by a margin of one vote. This was retracted the following year, when it reported the M.C.C. had informed them the vote was unanimous. Returning to captain a slightly weakened England side for the fourth and final Test, Hutton failed with the bat, as Pakistan recorded their first Test victory. In his three Test innings of the season, Hutton scored just 19 runs.

== Captain in Australia ==
Expectations before the tour were not high following the confusion over captaincy and England's performances against Pakistan. In addition, the selectors, of whom Hutton was one following his appointment, made some controversial choices, omitting Trueman, Jim Laker and Tony Lock who had been part of the winning England team in 1953, while including Colin Cowdrey, who had not been in good form in 1954, and Vic Wilson as cover to Compton, whose fitness was in question. Hutton had emphasised the need to include pace bowlers for the tour. Unlike the West Indies tour, the M.C.C. party sailed to Australia.

The tourists had some success in their first tour games, winning three matches and drawing two. Hutton played in every other game, resting in between, but made scores of 37, 98, 102 and 87; the latter two innings saved the game against New South Wales. Hutton went into the first Test with no spinner. At the start of the match, he won the toss and chose to bowl. It was he first time an England captain had done so in Australia, but the fifth time the team had done so on tour. The tourists suffered early misfortune, with regular wicket-keeper Godfrey Evans ill and Denis Compton breaking his hand while fielding in Australia's innings. Critics regarded the decision as a mistake at the time and have done so ever since, but Wisden's correspondent believed it may have been successful had England not suffered their bad luck and also dropped around twelve catches. Despite defensive bowling, Australia scored 601 for eight declared before England were bowled out 190 and 257 to lose by an innings; Hutton's scores were 4 and 15. Despite the result, Hutton increasingly saw potential in Tyson's bowling, arranging for Alf Gover, in Australia as a journalist but usually a respected coach, to improve and shorten Tyson's run to the wicket.

The tourists began the second Test with their confidence shaken. Hutton opted for a more balanced bowling attack; to include the spinners Bob Appleyard and Johnny Wardle, he left out Alec Bedser, England's most reliable bowler since the war, doubting that he was fit enough to play. Australia were also weakened by injuries for this Test, but his did not seem to matter when Hutton lost the toss, had to bat first and England collapsed to 154 in their first innings. Hutton batted over two hours for 30 in this innings and scored 28 in the second. However, in a low scoring match, Tyson proved to be the crucial factor and he bowled England to a 38 run win. After a break for Christmas, Hutton was unwell at the start of the third match in the series, suffering from fibrositis and a heavy cold. After deciding to play at the last minute, he again left out Bedser from the side, although he was fit to play. This was an unexpected decision. Hutton did not inform Bedser that he would not play before the match, and the bowler only learned of his fate when he saw the team list displayed in the dressing room before the match. Hutton scored 12 and 42, with the latter innings particularly valuable at a difficult time in the match. However, Peter May and Colin Cowdrey made large scores and Tyson took seven wickets as Australia were bowled out for 111 in their second innings, giving England a 128 run victory in a match where no innings total reached 300.

In the fourth Test, Hutton lost the toss and England bowled first in perfect conditions for batting. He used his bowlers in short spells, frequently rotating them, and they bowled Australia out for 323. In England's reply, Hutton made 80, his only fifty in the series and the highest score of the match, in four and a half hours before he fell to a very good catch. England scored 341. When Australia batted again, his introduction of Appleyard into the attack at a crucial time gave England the upper hand according to Wisden which noted that the move was "hailed as a touch of genius. Appleyard took early wickets, and the fast bowlers followed up to bowl Australia out for 111. England needed 94 to win, but lost early wickets to Miller, including Hutton. When Hutton returned to the dressing room, he said that Miller had "done us again." Compton, the next man in, replied "I haven't been in yet", and stayed at the wicket until the match was won by five wickets. Many critics and players viewed this as a sign that Hutton's reserved had slipped in the critical situation, but Alan Gibson believed that it was a deliberate act to get the best out of Compton. England had retained the Ashes, and went on to draw the final Test in a match ruined by rain. Hutton was out to the fourth ball of the match, but although a win was impossible in the time remaining, he kept the pressure on Australia when England bowled. Australia were forced to follow on for the first time by England since 1938, and Hutton took a wicket with the last ball of the match before time ran out. England won the series 3–1.

Hutton's tactical approach in the series was praised by Australian and English commentators; they noted how Hutton observed his opponents very carefully, leading to an ability to spot weaknesses. He gave nothing away in the field. His caution was criticised, but the main problem which journalists found with his leadership was his tactic of slowing down the speed at which overs were bowled: he used delaying measures to keep his fast bowlers fresh and slow the scoring. He also found it difficult to communicate with his team, or to fully explain himself. Australian commentators also detected technical faults in his batting. Wisden's correspondent wrote that Hutton had four different opening partners in the series; "the burden he carried in this respect, added to all the care and attention he gave to the captaincy both on and off the field, severely taxed him both mentally and physically." With the bat, Hutton scored 220 runs in Tests at an average of 24.44.

The tour ended with two Tests in New Zealand; England won the first by eight wickets. The tourists won the second by an innings and 20 runs. New Zealand were bowled out for 26 in their second innings, which remains the lowest Test score in August 2010. In the latter match, Hutton scored 53 batting at number five in his final Test innings.

== Retirement ==
Hutton returned to England by boat; the rest of the team travelled by air. On his arrival, he was made an honorary member of the M.C.C., which changed its rules to allow a current professional to join the club. The selectors appointed him as England captain for the entire forthcoming series against South Africa, on the condition he reduced time wasting by the team. Usually, captains were appointed for one or two matches; the only other captain to be appointed for a whole summer was C. B. Fry in 1912. However, Hutton's form was uncertain at the start of the 1955 season. He captained M.C.C. against the tourists, but had to withdraw from the final day of the match with lumbago. With his health uncertain, he resigned from the England captaincy. The selectors made Peter May captain in his place and appointed Hutton as a selector. Hutton continued to play for Yorkshire until the end of June. Against Nottinghamshire, he scored 194 in five hours. His last 100 runs came in an hour, a very fast rate of scoring, but this was his final first-class century. After the following match, his back became too painful to continue and he did not play again that season. That June, he was knighted for services to cricket. Following the advice of a specialist, Hutton announced his retirement from first-class cricket in January 1956. At 39, he was considered at the time to be young to retire.

== Bibliography ==
- Birley, Derek (1999). A Social History of English Cricket. London: Aurum Press. ISBN 1-85410-941-3.
- Gibson, Alan (1979). The Cricket Captains of England. London: Cassell. ISBN 0-304-29779-8.
- Howat, Gerald (1988). Len Hutton. The Biography. London: Heinemann Kingswood. ISBN 0-434-98150-8.
- Williams, Jack (1989). Cricket and England: A Cultural and Social History of Cricket in England between the Wars. London: Frank Cass. ISBN 0-7146-4861-2.
