= Frank Dennis =

English cricketer

Personal information
- Born: 11 June 1907; Holbeck, Leeds, Yorkshire, England
- Died: 21 November 2000 (aged 93); Christchurch, New Zealand
- Batting: Left-handed
- Bowling: Right-arm fast

Domestic team information
- Years: Team
- 1928–1933: Yorkshire
- 1935–1939: Cheshire

Career statistics
| Competition | First-class |
|---|---|
| Matches | 92 |
| Runs scored | 1,500 |
| Batting average | 19.73 |
| 100s/50s | 0/4 |
| Top score | 95 |
| Balls bowled | 10,438 |
| Wickets | 163 |
| Bowling average | 29.26 |
| 5 wickets in innings | 5 |
| 10 wickets in match | 0 |
| Best bowling | 6/42 |
| Catches/stumpings | 59/– |
- Source: Cricinfo, 19 February 2026

Frank Dennis (11 June 1907 – 21 November 2000) was an English first-class cricketer, who played in 89 matches for Yorkshire County Cricket Club from 1928 to 1933, and three for the Minor Counties from 1936 to 1939. He was awarded his Yorkshire cap in 1929.

== Life ==
Dennis was born in Holbeck, Leeds, Yorkshire, and learned his cricket in the Scarborough district. He was a right-arm fast bowler, who took 163 wickets at 29.26, with a best of 6 for 42 against Northamptonshire, one of five five-wicket hauls in his career. He was also an aggressive left-handed batsman who scored 1,500 runs at 19.73, with a best of 95 against the West Indies tourists. He also took 59 catches. His best season was 1929, when he took 84 wickets; Wisden praised his pace, but not his accuracy. He was unable to maintain his best form, and played most of his cricket in the 1930s in the leagues and for Cheshire in the Minor Counties Championship. He played for Heckleton Main, Hull, Baildon, and Undercliffe and scored over 1,000 runs as a professional for Oxton (Cheshire) in 1935.

He is part of a cricketing dynasty. His brother-in-law was Len Hutton; one of his nephews, Richard Hutton, likewise played for Yorkshire and England; other nephews, Simon Dennis, played for Yorkshire and Glamorgan, and John Hutton played a game for the Marylebone Cricket Club (MCC).

In 1948, he emigrated to New Zealand to take up fruit farming near Christchurch, and became a selector for the Canterbury Cricket Association. He and his wife Margaret had two sons and a daughter. One of their sons, Andrew (1944–2016), was a noted conservationist and author, and was awarded the MNZM.

Frank Dennis died in November 2000 in Christchurch at the age of 93.
