= Ben Hutton (cricketer) =

English cricketer

Personal information
- Full name: Benjamin Leonard Hutton
- Born: 29 January 1977 (age 49); Johannesburg, South Africa
- Batting: Left-handed
- Bowling: Right-arm fast-medium
- Role: Batsman
- Relatives: Oliver Hutton (brother); Richard Hutton (father); Len Hutton (grandfather); Ben Brocklehurst (grandfather)

Domestic team information
- Years: Team
- 1997–1999: Durham University
- 1998–1999: British Universities
- 1998–2007: Middlesex

Career statistics
Competition	FC	LA	T20
Matches	110	120	22
Runs scored	5,746	1,603	120
Batting average	33.21	20.03	10.00
100s/50s	18/18	0/0	0/0
Top score	152	77	27*
Balls bowled	3,558	1,765	90
Wickets	35	52	5
Bowling average	63.97	31.44	28.40
5 wickets in innings	2	1	0
10 wickets in match	0	0	0
Best bowling	4/37	5/45	2/21
Catches/stumpings	136/–	60/–	8/–
- Source: CricketArchive, 13 March 2012

Benjamin Leonard Hutton (born 29 January 1977), is an English former first-class cricketer.

== Early life ==
Ben Hutton was educated at Radley (1990–95) and Durham University (1996-99) for whom he opened the innings with the former England captain Andrew Strauss.

He came from cricketing stock as the elder son of the cricketer Richard Hutton and his grandfathers Sir Leonard Hutton and Ben Brocklehurst also played first-class cricket.

== Career ==
He represented Middlesex as a left-handed opening batsman, an enthusiastic fielder and occasional right-arm fast-medium bowler. He made his first-class debut in 1999 and was awarded his county cap in 2003. He captained the County between 2005 and 2006. In 108 first-class matches for the county, he scored 5,712 runs (average 33.60) with a highest score of 152 with 18 hundreds and 18 fifties and taking 136 catches. He announced his retirement from first-class cricket in October 2007 at the early age of 30.

== Retirement ==
He commenced a new career in the City and also completed the term of Don Bennett as a member of the Middlesex County Cricket Club Executive Board (2011–2012).

He joined Berenberg Bank in November 2007.

Sporting positions
Preceded by Andrew Strauss	Middlesex County Cricket Captain; 2005–2006	Succeeded by Ed Smith
Preceded by Don Bennett	Middlesex County Cricket Club Executive Board Member; 2011–2012	Succeeded by Alvan Seth-Smith
