= Anil Lakhani =

Kenyan cricketer

Personal information
- Full name: Anil Lakhani
- Born: 1938 (age 87–88); Nairobi, Kenya Colony
- Batting: Unknown
- Bowling: Unknown

Career statistics
Competition	First-class
Matches	1
Runs scored	99
Batting average	49.50
100s/50s	–/1
Top score	58
Balls bowled	6
Wickets	0
Bowling average	–
5 wickets in innings	–
10 wickets in match	–
Best bowling	–
Catches/stumpings	1/–
- Source: Cricinfo, 20 September 2021

Anil Lakhani (born 1938) is a Kenyan former first-class cricketer and medical doctor.

Lakhani was born at Nairobi in 1938 and was educated at Eastleigh High School. He made a single appearance in first-class cricket for a combined East Africa cricket team against the touring Indians at Kampala in 1967. Opening the batting twice in the match alongside the Ugandan Virani Noordin, he was dismissed in the East Africa first innings by B. S. Chandrasekhar for 41 runs, while in their second innings he was dismissed for 58 runs by the same bowler. Lakhani later emigrated to the United Kingdom, where he studied medicine at the University of Glasgow Medical School, graduating in 1976. He subsequently moved to London in 1983 to take up a haematologist post and later became a consultant haematologist at Bromley Hospital. He retired in 2014. Lakhani married Irene in 1979, with the couple having two sons.
