= Charlie de Souza =

Ugandan cricketer

Personal information
- Full name: Charles de Souza
- Born: Not known Uganda Protectorate
- Batting: Unknown
- Bowling: Unknown

Career statistics
Competition	First-class
Matches	1
Runs scored	22
Batting average	11.00
100s/50s	–/–
Top score	22
Balls bowled	120
Wickets	1
Bowling average	75.00
5 wickets in innings	–
10 wickets in match	–
Best bowling	1/75
Catches/stumpings	–/–
- Source: Cricinfo, 31 January 2022

Charles de Souza (date of birth not known) was a Ugandan first-class cricketer.

The son of Deoniz de Souza, he was born in Uganda Protectorate. A figure in Ugandan cricket since 1952 and considered the best Ugandan all-rounder of the time, he made a single appearance in first-class cricket for an East African Invitation XI against the touring Marylebone Cricket Club at Kampala in November 1963. Batting twice in the match from the lower order, he was dismissed for without scoring in the East African first innings by David Larter, while in their second innings he was dismissed for 22 runs by Jeff Jones. With the ball, he took the wicket of Tom Cartwright to finish with match figures of 1 for 75. He played minor matches for Uganda from 1953 to 1970, captaining the side in what would be his final match against Zambia. In 1972, he had once again been named in the Uganda squad for their upcoming internationals, but as an Asian-Ugandan he was expelled from Uganda by Idi Amin in the same year and thus never appeared again for Uganda.
