= Jagoo Shah =

Kenyan cricketer

Personal information
- Full name: Jagoo Chandrakant Shah
- Born: 1953 (age 72–73); Kenya Colony
- Batting: Unknown
- Bowling: Leg break googly

Career statistics
Competition	First-class
Matches	1
Runs scored	61
Batting average	30.50
100s/50s	–/1
Top score	53*
Balls bowled	14
Wickets	1
Bowling average	12
5 wickets in innings	–
10 wickets in match	–
Best bowling	1/12
Catches/stumpings	–/–
- Source: Cricinfo, 19 September 2021

Jagoo Chandrakant Shah (born 1953) is a Kenyan former first-class cricketer.

Shah made a single appearance in first-class cricket for a combined East Africa cricket team against the touring Marylebone Cricket Club (MCC) at Nairobi in 1974. Opening the batting twice in the match alongside Narendra Thakker, he was dismissed by Roger Knight for 53 runs in the East Africa first innings, and for 8 runs by John Hutton in the second. He took the wicket of David Acfield with his leg break googly bowling in the MCC first innings. Shah also played minor matches for Kenya prior to their membership of the International Cricket Council.
