= Simon Dennis (cricketer) =

English cricketer

Simon John Dennis (born 18 October 1960, Scarborough, Yorkshire, England) is an English first-class cricketer, who appeared in 104 first-class matches for Yorkshire County Cricket Club, Glamorgan County Cricket Club and Orange Free State in South Africa.

A left arm fast medium bowler, and right-handed tail end batsman, Dennis was born into a family with strong cricketing credentials. Len Hutton was his uncle, and he is a cousin of fellow first-class cricketers John and Richard Hutton.

Dennis took 254 first-class wickets in a career which spanned from 1980 to 1991, at a cost of 33.17 each, with a best performance of 5 for 35. He took 66 wickets in one day games at 51.09, with a best of 3 for 19. He averaged 9.42 with the bat in the first-class game, with one fifty, and 7.27 in one day matches with a best score of 50.

He played for England Schools and Young England against Young Australia in 1980, before making his debut for his home county in the same year. He won his Yorkshire cap in 1983, and helped them win the Sunday League title. In 1988, Dennis left to play for Glamorgan for three more seasons, taking the last 60 of his first-class scalps despite increasing injury problems.

Dennis played for Orange Free State in 1982/83, and toured North America in 1982 and Argentina in 1990 with the Marylebone Cricket Club (MCC).
