= Charanjive Sharma =

Kenyan cricketer

Personal information
- Full name: Charanjive Kumar Sharma
- Born: 1946 (age 79–80); Kenya
- Role: Batsman

International information
- National sides: Kenya (1965-1982); East Africa (1972–1979)
- Source: CricketArchive, 27 December 2023

Charanjive Kumar Sharma (born 1946) is a former Kenyan cricketer who played internationally for East Africa, including captaining them at the 1979 ICC Trophy.

A regular player for Kenya in regional tournaments, Sharma first played for East Africa in 1972, when he toured England and played against several county teams. He was the most consistent East African batsman on the tour, scoring 725 runs in 24 innings including a top score of 82 against Leicestershire. He missed the 1975 Cricket World Cup, but captained the East African team the 1979 ICC Trophy in England. He was the team's third highest run scorer at the tournament and its second highest wicket taker.
