= Indian Gymkhana Cricket Club Ground =

Cricket ground in Osterley, London

Coordinates: 51.4793°N 0.3509°W

- Interactive map of Indian Gymkhana Cricket Club Ground

Ground information
- Location: Osterley, London
- Country: England
- Establishment: 1916

International information
- Only women's ODI: 26 July 1986: England v India
- As of 6 September 2020; Source: Ground profile

Indian Gymkhana Cricket Club Ground is a cricket ground in Osterley, London (formerly Middlesex). which was founded in 1916. The first recorded match on the ground was in 1932, when Indian Gymkhana played the touring Indians. The ground has also held Middlesex Second XI fixtures, the first of which came in the 1935 Minor Counties Championship when the Middlesex Second XI played the Glamorgan Second XI. From 1935 to 1936, the ground hosted four Minor Counties Championship matches, the last of which saw the Middlesex Second XI play Cornwall.

In 1986, the ground held a single Women's One Day International between England women and India women.

In local domestic cricket, the ground is the home venue of Indian Gymkhana Cricket Club. The ground also has hockey and football playing facilities hosting the Indian Gymkhana F.C.
