= Michael Dunn (cricketer) =

English cricketer (born 1940)

Mike Dunn
Personal information
- Full name: Michael Thomas Dunn
- Born: 14 November 1940; Doncaster, Yorkshire, England
- Died: 17 March 2025 (aged 84)
- Batting: Right-handed
- Bowling: Right-arm fast-medium

Domestic team information
- Years: Team
- 1976–1977: Minor Counties West
- 1973: Minor Counties South
- 1969–1981: Hertfordshire

Career statistics
| Competition | List A |
|---|---|
| Matches | 16 |
| Runs scored | 187 |
| Batting average | 14.38 |
| 100s/50s | 0/0 |
| Top score | 41 |
| Balls bowled | 930 |
| Wickets | 12 |
| Bowling average | 47.00 |
| 5 wickets in innings | 0 |
| 10 wickets in match | – |
| Best bowling | 3/27 |
| Catches/stumpings | 3/– |
- Source: Cricinfo, 5 September 2011

Michael Thomas Dunn (14 November 1940 – 17 March 2025) was an English cricketer. Dunn was a right-handed batsman who bowled right-arm fast-medium. He was born in Doncaster, Yorkshire.

Dunn made his debut for Hertfordshire in the 1969 Minor Counties Championship against Cambridgeshire. He played Minor counties cricket for Hertfordshire from 1969 to 1979, making 43 appearances. He made his List A debut against Surrey in the 1971 Gillette Cup. He made six further List A appearances for the county, the last of which came against Essex in the 1981 NatWest Trophy. In his six List A matches, he scored 44 runs at an average of 7.33, with a high score of 13. With the ball, he took 9 wickets at a bowling average of 28.33, with best figures of 3/27.

He also made a single List A appearance for Minor Counties South in the 1973 Benson & Hedges Cup against Glamorgan, as well as for Minor Counties West, who he first appeared for in the 1976 Benson & Hedges Cup against Glamorgan. He made seven further List A appearances for the team, the last of which came against Worcestershire in the 1977 Benson & Hedges Cup. In his eight appearances for the team, he scored 141 runs at an average of 23.66, with a high score of 41. With the ball he took 3 wickets at an average of 92.66, with best figures of 1/29.
