= Ganda Lal =

Ugandan cricketer

Personal information
- Full name: Ganda Lal
- Born: Not known Uganda Protectorate
- Batting: Unknown
- Bowling: Unknown

Domestic team information
- Years: Team
- 1955/56–1963/64: Uganda
- 1963/64: East Africa

Career statistics
Competition	First-class
Matches	1
Runs scored	0
Batting average	0.00
100s/50s	–/–
Top score	0*
Balls bowled	36
Wickets	0
Bowling average	–
5 wickets in innings	–
10 wickets in match	–
Best bowling	–
Catches/stumpings	–/–
- Source: Cricinfo, 31 January 2022

Ganda Lal (date of birth not known) is a Ugandan former first-class cricketer.

He played cricket for Uganda from 1955 to 1964. He played one First-class match for East Africa against the touring Marylebone Cricket Club (MCC) team in November 1963. In the match, batting at number 11, he was not out without scoring a run. In the second innings he was absent hurt and did not bat. In the MCC innings he opened the bowling but only bowled six overs, conceding 23 runs and taking no wickets with an economy rate of 3.83.
