= Lawrence Fernandes (cricketer) =

Ugandan cricketer

Personal information
- Full name: Lawrence Fernandes
- Born: 1945 (age 80–81); Uganda Protectorate
- Batting: Right-handed
- Bowling: Leg break googly

Career statistics
Competition	First-class
Matches	1
Runs scored	39
Batting average	19.50
100s/50s	–/–
Top score	32
Balls bowled	36
Wickets	0
Bowling average	–
5 wickets in innings	–
10 wickets in match	–
Best bowling	–
Catches/stumpings	–/–
- Source: Cricinfo, 1 February 2022

Lawrence Fernandes (born 1945) is a Ugandan former first-class cricketer.

Fernandes was born in Uganda Protectorate in 1942. He spent sometime in Mombasa in Kenya, before returning to Uganda in the 1960s. An all-rounder and described as the best gully fielder in Uganda, Fernandes made a single appearance in first-class cricket for the East Africa cricket team against the touring Indians at Kampala in 1967. Batting twice in the match, he was dismissed for 7 runs in the East African first innings by Venkataraman Subramanya, while in their second innings he was dismissed for 32 runs by B. S. Chandrasekhar. Between 1963 and 1970, Fernandes also played minor matches for Uganda, in which he formed a potent spin bowling partnership with Kishore Vasani. In 1972, he had been named in the Uganda squad for their upcoming internationals, but as an Asian-Ugandan he was expelled from Uganda by Idi Amin in the same year.
