= Virani Noordin =

Ugandan cricketer

Personal information
- Full name: Virani Noordin
- Born: Not known Uganda Protectorate
- Batting: Unknown

Career statistics
| Competition | First-class |
|---|---|
| Matches | 1 |
| Runs scored | 40 |
| Batting average | 20.00 |
| 100s/50s | –/– |
| Top score | 20 |
| Catches/stumpings | –/– |
- Source: Cricinfo, 31 January 2022

Virani Noordin (date of birth not known) is a Ugandan former first-class cricketer.

Noordin was born in Uganda Protectorate. A figure in Ugandan cricket since the 1960s, when he was considered the most prolific batsman in the country, Noordin made a single appearance in first-class cricket for the East Africa cricket team against the touring Indians at Kampala in 1967. Opening the batting twice in the match, he was dismissed for 20 runs in the East African first innings by Sadanand Mohol, while in their second innings he was dismissed for the same score by Venkataraman Subramanya.
