= Vasant Tapu =

Tanzanian cricketer

Personal information
- Full name: Vasant Tapu Harji Chavda
- Born: 1936; Tanganyika
- Died: August 1988 (aged 51–52)
- Batting: Left-handed
- Bowling: Left-arm fast-medium/Left-arm orthodox spin
- Role: All-rounder

Domestic team information
- Years: Team
- 1967-1974: East Africa
- FC debut: 19 August 1967 East Africa v India
- Last FC: 18 January 1974 East Africa v MCC

Career statistics
Competition	First-class
Matches	2
Runs scored	96
Batting average	24.00
100s/50s	0/1
Top score	55
Balls bowled	246
Wickets	8
Bowling average	21.12
5 wickets in innings	1
10 wickets in match	0
Best bowling	5/72
Catches/stumpings	1/–
- Source: CricketArchive, 22 August 2008

Vasant Tapu Harji Chavda, commonly known as Vasant Tapu (1936–1988), was a Tanzanian cricketer. A left-handed batsman and left-arm fast-medium/left-arm orthodox spin bowler, he played for the Tanzania national cricket team from 1967 to 1974 and also played first-class cricket for East Africa.

== Biography ==
Born in Tanganyika in 1936, Vasant Tapu began to play international cricket in August 1967 with two matches against India. The first was for Tanzania in Dar es Salaam and the second was a first-class match for East Africa in Kampala. In the first-class match, he scored 55 in the East Africa first innings and took 5/72 in the Indian first innings, his best batting and bowling performances in first-class cricket.

He played in the East African Quadrangular tournament in 1969 and 1970, and again in 1971, 1972 and 1974 when it had become a triangular tournament. He also went on a tour of England with East Africa in 1972. His last match for Tanzania was against Zambia in August 1974, and he had played his second and final first-class match earlier in the year, against the MCC in Nairobi. He died in 1988.
