= Upendra Patel =

Ugandan cricketer

Personal information
- Full name: Upendra Raojibhai Patel
- Born: 1942 (age 83–84); Uganda Protectorate
- Batting: Unknown
- Bowling: Right-arm medium-fast

Career statistics
Competition	First-class
Matches	1
Runs scored	111
Batting average	111.00
100s/50s	1/–
Top score	105*
Balls bowled	66
Wickets	2
Bowling average	39.00
5 wickets in innings	–
10 wickets in match	–
Best bowling	1/31
Catches/stumpings	1/–
- Source: Cricinfo, 31 January 2022

Upendra Raojibhai Patel (born 1942) is a Ugandan former first-class cricketer.

Patel was born in Uganda Protectorate in 1942. Patel made a single appearance in first-class cricket for the East Africa cricket team against the touring Indians at Kampala in 1967. Batting at number seven, he scored an unbeaten 105 in East Africa's first innings total of 308 all out, while in their second innings he was dismissed for 6 runs by B. S. Chandrasekhar, having been promoted up the batting order to number four. With his medium-fast bowling, he took the wickets of Farokh Engineer and Budhi Kunderan, to finish with match figures of 2 for 78. Between 1967 and 1971, Patel also played minor matches for Uganda.
