= Len Hutton =

English cricketer (1916–1990)

Sir Len Hutton
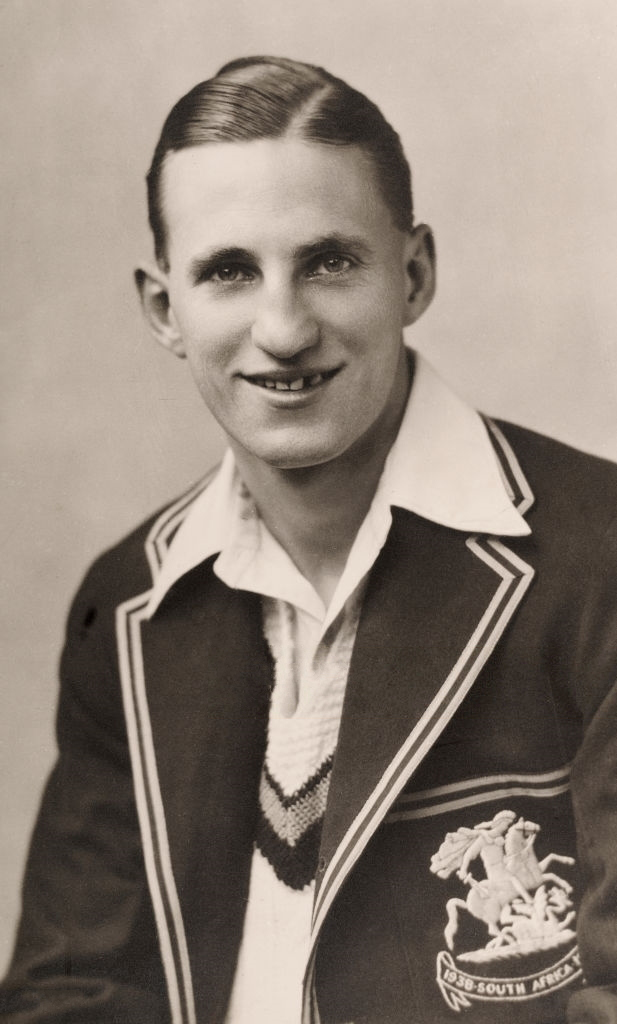
- Hutton in about 1938

Personal information
- Full name: Leonard Hutton
- Born: 23 June 1916; Fulneck, Pudsey, Yorkshire, England
- Died: 6 September 1990 (aged 74); Kingston-upon-Thames, London, England
- Batting: Right-handed
- Bowling: Right-arm leg break
- Role: Opening batsman
- Relatives: Richard Hutton (son); John Hutton (son)

International information
- National side: England
- Test debut (cap 294): 26 June 1937 v New Zealand
- Last Test: 25 March 1955 v New Zealand

Domestic team information
- Years: Team
- 1934–1955: Yorkshire
- 1938–1960: Marylebone Cricket Club

Career statistics
Competition	Test	First-class
Matches	79	513
Runs scored	6,971	40,140
Batting average	56.67	55.51
100s/50s	19/33	129/179
Top score	364	364
Balls bowled	260	9,740
Wickets	3	173
Bowling average	77.33	29.51
5 wickets in innings	0	4
10 wickets in match	0	1
Best bowling	1/2	6/76
Catches/stumpings	57/–	401/–
- Source: CricInfo, 14 August 2007

Sir Leonard Hutton (23 June 1916 – 6 September 1990) was an English cricketer. He played as an opening batsman for Yorkshire County Cricket Club from 1934 to 1955 and for England in 79 Test matches between 1937 and 1955. Wisden Cricketers' Almanack described him as "one of the greatest batsmen in the history of cricket". He set a record in 1938 for the highest individual innings in a Test match in only his sixth Test appearance, scoring 364 runs against Australia, a milestone that stood for nearly 20 years (and remains an England Test record 86 years later as of 2025). Following the Second World War, he was the mainstay of England's batting. In 1952, he became the first professional cricketer of the 20th century to captain England in Tests; under his captaincy England won the Ashes the following year for the first time in 19 years.

Marked out as a potential star from his teenage years, Hutton made his debut for Yorkshire in 1934 and quickly established himself at county level. By 1937, he was playing for England and when the war interrupted his career in 1939, critics regarded him as one of the leading batsmen in the country, and even the world. During the war, he received a serious injury to his arm while taking part in a commando training course. His arm never fully recovered, forcing him to alter his batting style. When cricket restarted, Hutton resumed his role as one of England's leading batsmen; by the time of England's tour to Australia in 1950–51, the team relied heavily on his batting and did so for the remainder of his career. As a batsman, Hutton was cautious and built his style on a sound defence. Although capable of attacking strokeplay, both Yorkshire and England depended on him, and awareness of this affected his style. Hutton remains statistically among the best batsmen to have played Test cricket.

Hutton captained the England Test team between 1952 and 1955, although his leadership was at times controversial. His cautious approach led critics to accuse him of negativity. Never comfortable in the role, Hutton felt that the former amateur players who administered and governed English cricket did not trust him. In 23 Tests as captain, he won eight Tests and lost four with the others drawn. Worn out by the mental and physical demands of his role, Hutton retired from regular first-class cricket during the 1955 season. Knighted for his contributions to cricket in 1956, he went on to be a Test selector, a journalist and broadcaster. He also worked as a representative for an engineering firm until retiring from the job in 1984. Hutton remained involved in cricket and became president of Yorkshire County Cricket Club in 1990. He died a few months afterwards in September 1990, aged 74.

== Early life ==
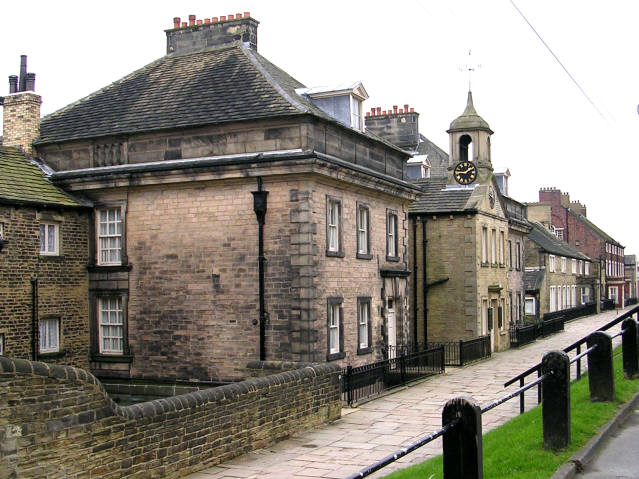
Fulneck, where Hutton grew up

Hutton was born on 23 June 1916 in the Moravian community of Fulneck, Pudsey, the youngest of five children to Henry Hutton and his wife Lily (née Swithenbank). Many of his family were local cricketers and Hutton soon became immersed in the sport, which he both played and read about with enthusiasm. He practised in the playground of Littlemoor Council School, which he attended from 1921 until 1930, and at Pudsey St Lawrence Cricket Club, which he joined as a junior. At the age of 12, he made his first appearance for Pudsey St Lawrence's second eleven and by 1929 had reached the first team. Locals encouraged him to meet the Yorkshire and England cricketer Herbert Sutcliffe, a neighbour, from whom Hutton received coaching in Sutcliffe's garden. Sutcliffe was impressed by the young batsman, and commended him to Yorkshire as a good prospect.

Following this endorsement, Hutton went to the county's indoor practice shed at Headingley in February 1930. George Hirst, a former Yorkshire cricketer responsible for assessing and coaching young players, believed that Hutton's batting technique was essentially already complete. Bill Bowes, the Yorkshire pace bowler, was equally impressed, and helped Hutton to correct a minor flaw in his technique. Hutton was sufficiently encouraged to decide to attempt a career in professional cricket, but at the prompting of his parents decided to learn a trade as well. During 1930, he watched the Australian Don Bradman hit 334 at Headingley in a Test match, then a record individual score in Tests—which he himself would surpass eight years later. Later that year, Hutton enrolled at Pudsey Grammar School where he spent a year studying technical drawing and quantitative work before joining his father at a local building firm, Joseph Verity. After becoming a professional cricketer, Hutton continued to work for the company during winter months until 1939.

== Career before the Second World War ==
=== First years with Yorkshire ===
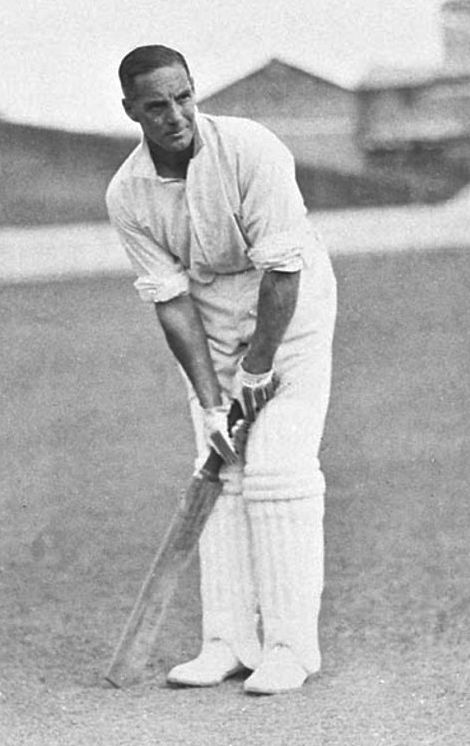
Herbert Sutcliffe in 1924: Sutcliffe recognised Hutton's potential in Pudsey during 1929. He later established an opening partnership with Hutton and wrote that his partner was "a marvel – the discovery of a generation".

By 1933, Hutton was regularly opening the batting for the Pudsey St Lawrence first team in the Bradford Cricket League. By close observation of his opening partner, the former Yorkshire county batsman Edgar Oldroyd, Hutton further developed his batting technique, especially in defence. The local press soon identified Hutton as a player of promise, particularly after he scored a match-winning 108 not out in the Priestley Cup. Senior figures within Yorkshire cricket identified him as a potential successor to Percy Holmes as an opening partner to Sutcliffe; at this stage in his career, Hutton was also considered a promising leg spin bowler. In the 1933 season Hutton was selected for the Yorkshire Second Eleven. Although he failed to score a run in either of his first two innings, over the season he scored 699 runs at an average of 69.90. Yorkshire appointed Cyril Turner as Hutton's mentor; Hedley Verity and Bowes also offered Hutton guidance in his early career.

Hutton made his first-class debut for Yorkshire in 1934, at the age of 17 the youngest Yorkshire player since Hirst, 45 years earlier. In his first match, against Cambridge University, he was run out for a duck but scored an unbeaten 50 runs in his second match; he followed this with another half-century against Warwickshire on his County Championship debut. He played regularly for the rest of the season but to prevent his overexposure to Championship cricket, Yorkshire limited his appearances and returned him periodically to the second eleven. In matches for the first team, Hutton shared large first-wicket partnerships with Wilf Barber and with Arthur Mitchell, before scoring his maiden first-class century in an innings of 196 against Worcestershire. At the time, he was the youngest Yorkshire batsman to score a first-class century. He finished the season with a total of 863 runs at an average of 33.19;

An operation on his nose before the 1935 season delayed Hutton's appearance on the cricket field that year. Attempting to return too quickly, he endured poor health which limited his subsequent appearances and effectiveness; by the middle of August he had scored a total of just 73 runs. A century against Middlesex led to run of bigger scores, and his contribution to Yorkshire's County Championship victory that season was 577 runs at an average in first-class matches of 28.85. In the winter of 1935–36 Hutton went on his first overseas tour, as Yorkshire visited Jamaica. In the 1936 season he reached 1,000 runs in a season for the first time—1,282 runs at an average of 29.81—and was awarded his county cap in July. He took part in several large partnerships through the season, including one of 230 with Sutcliffe, although he experienced a sequence of low scores in May and June.

Throughout his first seasons, Hutton faced press criticism for his caution and reluctance to play attacking shots. Although regarding him a certain England selection in the future, critics thought Hutton slightly dull and pedestrian. Yorkshire remained unconcerned; cricket writer Alan Hill believes Hutton's subsequent success was built on this initial establishment of a defensive technique. His achievements brought limited recognition, owing to the high level of expectation surrounding him. This sense of frustration was heightened by comments from Sutcliffe in 1935, when he wrote that Hutton was "a certainty for a place as England's opening batsman. He is a marvel – the discovery of a generation ... His technique is that of a maestro." Such praise was rare from Sutcliffe, but Hutton found the comments a burden, while others found them embarrassing.

=== Test match debut ===
After Hutton began 1937 with a series of high scores—including an innings of 271 against Derbyshire, the reigning County Champions, and 153 against Leicestershire two days later when he and Sutcliffe shared a 315-run opening partnership—he was chosen to play for England against New Zealand in the first Test match of the season. On 26 June, he made his Test debut at Lord's Cricket Ground, scoring 0 and 1. Retaining his place in the England team after scoring centuries for Yorkshire in the following games, he scored his maiden Test hundred on 24 July in the second Test at Old Trafford, Manchester. He batted for three-and-a-half hours to score exactly 100 runs and shared a century opening partnership with Charlie Barnett. Hutton's remaining two innings in the Test series yielded 14 and 12, giving him 127 runs at an average of 25.40. Also in 1937, Hutton made his first appearance for the Players against the Gentlemen at Lord's. In total that year he scored 2,888 runs, more than double his previous seasonal best, at an average of 56.62 and including ten centuries. He also recorded the best bowling performance of his career, six wickets for 76 against Leicestershire, altogether taking ten wickets in the match—the only time he achieved this. His performances that year earned him selection as one of Wisden's Cricketers of the Year. The citation praised his attitude, technique, fielding and bowling, noting however that some commentators continued to criticise his overcaution.

In early matches of the 1938 season, with an Ashes series against Australia pending, Hutton made three centuries and scored 93 not out. Selected for a Test trial, he shared a century opening partnership with Bill Edrich, and was selected for the first Test at Trent Bridge in Nottingham beginning on 28 June. In just over three hours, Hutton scored 100 from 221 deliveries on his Ashes debut, adding 219 with Charlie Barnett for the first wicket. England, in Wally Hammond's first match as Test captain, posted a total of 658 for eight wickets, but the match was drawn. Hutton failed in the second Test, with two single figure scores in another drawn game. He was generally unsuccessful with the bat in the following weeks, during which the third Test was entirely rained off. Following a sequence of low scores for Yorkshire, Hutton's finger was broken in a match against Middlesex played on a dangerous pitch at Lord's. Consequently, he could not play in the fourth Test, played at his home ground, Headingley, in which England were soundly beaten. After missing a month of cricket, Hutton played just two games before his selection for the final Test of the series.

=== Test record score ===
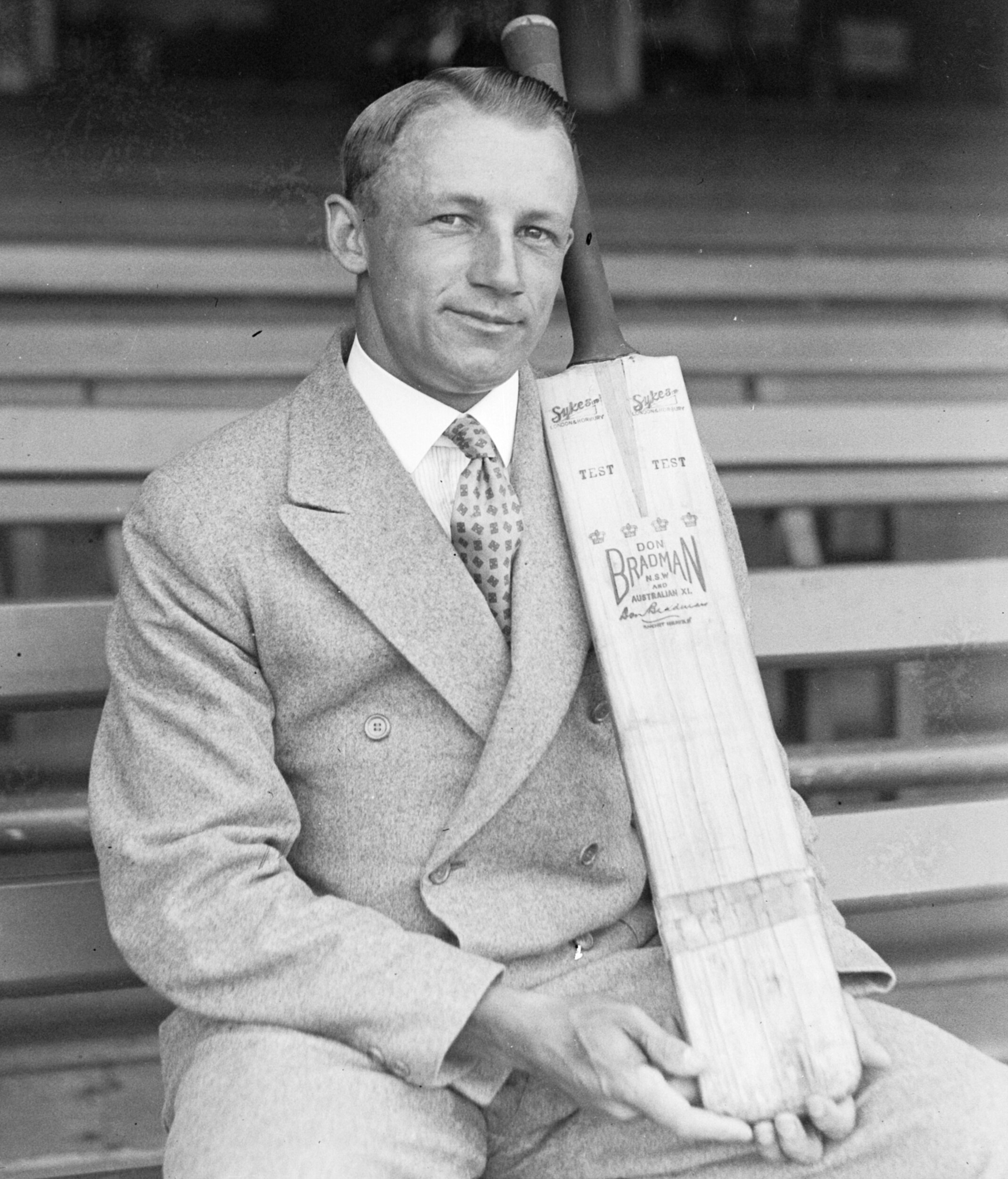
Donald Bradman, whose Ashes record score of 334 Hutton broke in 1938

The last Test was played at The Oval and began on 20 August 1938. Hammond won the toss on a very good pitch for batting, and after an early wicket fell, Hutton and Maurice Leyland, his Yorkshire teammate, took the score to 347 for one wicket after the first day. Hutton was unbeaten on 160 although Australia missed a chance to dismiss him, stumped, when he had scored 40. After a rest day, the Yorkshire batsmen took their partnership to 382 before Leyland was out. Hutton then shared substantial partnerships with Hammond and Joe Hardstaff junior, taking his personal score to 300 at the end of the second day, out of a total of 634 for five. In the process he surpassed the previous highest Test score by an England batsman in a home match. Hutton maintained caution throughout; Wisden commented that his dominance of the bowling had become slightly monotonous after two days, although it recognised his skill. On the third day (23 August), the Australians made a concerted effort to dismiss Hutton before he broke Bradman's 1930 record Ashes score of 334— the record score in a Test match was Hammond's 336 not out against New Zealand, but it was compiled against what was perceived as inferior bowling, and Bradman's total was more prestigious. Although showing nerves as he approached the record, Hutton passed Bradman's score with a cut off Chuck Fleetwood-Smith, and extended his score to 364 before he was out, caught. Lasting for more than 13 hours, with 847 balls faced, Hutton's innings was the longest in first-class cricket at the time. It was only the sixth Test of his career. The innings was the highest individual score in a Test until Garfield Sobers scored 365 not out in 1958; it remains the 6th highest in Tests and is the most runs scored in an innings by an English player. England eventually scored 903, the highest team total in a Test at that time, before Hammond declared the innings closed. Australia were bowled out twice and England won by an innings and 579 runs to draw the series with one victory apiece.

Commentators mainly praised Hutton's concentration and stamina; his slow scoring, particularly when compared to Bradman's innings of 334, was excused on the grounds that the Oval match was played without a time limit, and run accumulation was more important than fast scoring. Furthermore, Hammond had instructed Hutton to bat as long as possible. Among views expressed by Test cricketers, Les Ames believed that while Hutton had shown great skill, a combination of a very easy wicket for batting and an unusually weak bowling attack presented an ideal opportunity. Former England captain Bob Wyatt described the innings as one of the greatest feats of concentration and endurance in the history of the game. Some critics expressed distaste at England's approach, but this opinion was not widely shared. In the aftermath of the innings, Hutton became famous, in constant demand from the public and press who compared him to Bradman. Hutton later described the acclamation he received as one of the worst things that happened to him, not least because expectations were unreasonably high every time he subsequently batted. When the season ended, Hutton had scored 1,874 runs in all matches at an average of 60.45.

=== Leading batsman ===
From October 1938, Hutton toured South Africa with the Marylebone Cricket Club (MCC)—the name by which England teams toured at the time—under the captaincy of Hammond; England won the series 1–0, with the other four games drawn. (Note: Throughout Hutton's career, the MCC organised and administered English cricket. Official English touring teams always played under the name of MCC and were only styled "England" during Test matches.) He scored centuries in two early matches but in a match against Transvaal, a delivery from Eric Davies knocked him unconscious and forced him to miss the first Test. Unsuccessful on his return in the second Test, Hutton scored a double century in the following tour match, but had another low score in the third Test, which England won. He was more successful in the final Tests. In the fourth, on a difficult pitch for batting, he scored 92. The final Test was drawn after ten days of play in a supposedly "timeless" Test. In a match which set a record aggregate of runs, Hutton scored 38 and 55 but his contributions were overshadowed by the heavy scoring of others. Although Hutton scored 265 runs in the Test series, at an average of 44.16, critics were disappointed, expecting more after his record innings of 1938. In all first-class matches, he scored 1,168 runs at an average of 64.88, the highest aggregate among the tourists, and accumulated five centuries. Spectators found his batting attractive and the Wisden correspondent regarded him the most accomplished batsman on the tour.

In its summary of the 1939 season, Wisden noted the development of Hutton into a more exciting batsman to watch, observing that he "gave further evidence of being one of the world's greatest batsmen". He began to dominate opening partnerships with Sutcliffe, in contrast to prior seasons when he was the junior partner. In total, he scored 2,883 runs, over 400 more than any other batsman and his average of 62.27 placed him second in the national averages behind Hammond. Among his twelve centuries, Hutton scored his highest total for Yorkshire, 280 not out in six hours against Hampshire, sharing an opening partnership of 315 with Sutcliffe. His contributions helped Yorkshire to their third successive Championship. He was also successful in representative matches, scoring 86 for the Players against the Gentlemen, and compiling 480 runs (averaging 96.00) in the Test matches against West Indies. England won the series, after recording victory in the first match and drawing the others. Hutton scored 196 in the first Test, hitting his last 96 runs in 95 minutes; he and Denis Compton scored 248 runs together in 133 minutes. After low scores in the second Test, Hutton scored 73 and 165 not out in the final game at the Oval. Facing a West Indian lead of 146, he batted five hours in the second innings, sharing a partnership of 264 with Hammond. He ended his season with a century against Sussex in Yorkshire's final match before the war; two days after its conclusion, the Second World War began.

== Wartime injury and recovery ==
At the beginning of the war, Hutton volunteered for the army and was recruited to the Army Physical Training Corps as a sergeant-instructor. Although no first-class cricket was played during the war, league and charity cricket matches continued and Hutton played several high-profile matches in 1940. But in March 1941, his future in cricket was threatened by a serious injury. On the last day of a commando training course in York, Hutton fell in the gymnasium when a mat slipped from under him. He suffered a fractured left forearm and dislocated his ulna at the wrist. By the summer, surgery and rest initially looked to have repaired the injury; Hutton returned to his unit and resumed cricket, scoring a century in one game. However, he began to suffer increasing pain and underwent more surgery to graft bone from his legs onto the injured arm. A first operation failed, but the second attempt at the end of 1941 eventually proved successful. The surgery left him with a left arm almost two inches shorter than the right. He was discharged from the army in the summer of 1942 and, after a period of recovery, began work as a civilian for the Royal Engineers, inspecting the condition of government-owned properties. Hutton's recovery and return to cricket was closely followed by the wartime press, which kept track of many pre-war cricketers.

Hutton resumed professional cricket with Pudsey St Lawrence in 1943, briefly captaining the team before poor results and a disagreement with the committee led him to resign the captaincy. He played for Pudsey until 1945, batting successfully and helping the team to the Priestley Cup, but his relationship with the club remained strained and he did not play for them again after 1945. When the war ended in 1945, a programme of first-class matches was organised, involving counties and other teams. A series of matches was played between England and an Australian Services cricket team, called Victory Tests although they were not official Test matches. Hutton played in all three games with mixed success. He scored 46 in the second match, but was struck painfully on his weak arm by a short ball from Keith Miller, whom he encountered for the first time. After scoring 81 for Yorkshire against the Australian team, Hutton scored 104 and 69 in the final "Test". Another century followed for Yorkshire against the Australians, taking his first-class run aggregate to 782 runs at an average of 48.87 in nine games. Commentators were satisfied that his batting technique remained effective and that he could still succeed at the highest level. The showpiece match of the season was England against the Dominions at Lord's, but Hutton was prevented from appearing by his commitments to Pudsey.

== Career after the war ==
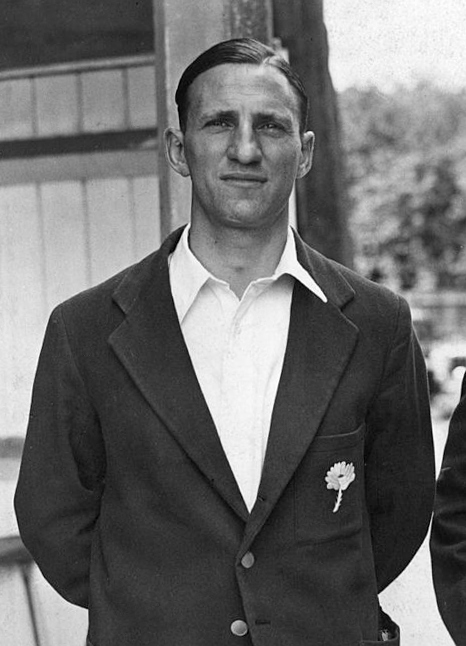
Hutton on 12 July 1946

=== First tour to Australia ===
County cricket fully resumed in 1946. Hutton was troubled by his injury; his wrists no longer rotated fully and he abandoned the hook shot. Nevertheless, he scored 1,552 runs at an average of 48.50, and was recognised by Wisden as Yorkshire's most effective batsman as the county won their fourth consecutive championship title. His four centuries included 183 not out against the touring Indian team, but he was less successful in the three Tests, scoring 123 runs at an average of 30.75. England won the series 1–0 but Hutton's only fifty was a defensive innings in the second Test, when he was troubled by a bad back. He was omitted from the Gentlemen and Players match, but was part of the MCC team touring party for the 1946–47 tour of Australia.

The MCC were reluctant to tour so soon after the war, but the Australian authorities were insistent. The tourists, led once more by Wally Hammond, were beaten 3–0 in the Test series, finding their opponents much stronger than expected. Hutton began the tour well, scoring two early centuries, the latter of which was described by Wisden as the best English innings of the tour. A string of other good performances drew praise from press and former players; one such report named him the best batsman in the world. However, Hutton failed to reach a score of 50 runs in the first three Tests; in the first, he was out for a first ball duck, and in the second, a short ball from Keith Miller struck him on his injured arm. In the second innings of the latter game, he quickly scored 37, frequently driving the bowling of Miller and Fred Freer before the bat slipped from his hand and hit the wicket, ending the innings. Even so, the display was praised by critics.

In the final two Tests, Hutton shared three consecutive century opening partnerships with Cyril Washbrook. A four-hour 94 in the first innings was followed by 76 in the second. Press opinion was divided over Hutton's performance; some critics, including the Australian bowlers, detected insecurity against fast bowling, particularly the bouncers with which Ray Lindwall and Miller targeted him. Hutton's preferred tactic of ducking under the ball reinforced the impression that he was afraid. In the final Test, Hutton scored a century, batting through the first day to score 122 not out, his first Test century in Australia, despite another barrage from Lindwall and Miller. The Sydney Morning Herald criticised the high number of short balls bowled by the Australian pacemen, bowled at Hutton as often as three times per over. After the second day was rained off, Hutton was taken ill overnight with tonsillitis, missed the remainder of the match and flew home soon after. In all first-class matches on tour, Hutton scored 1,267 runs at an average of 70.38, while in the Tests, he managed 417 runs at an average of 52.12; he topped both sets of averages. Wisden noted that it took him time to find form in the Tests, but that he often batted well despite ill health. Bill Bowes, covering the tour as a journalist, believed that Hutton was unable to master bowling faster than he had encountered for eight years, but acquitted himself reasonably well.

=== Series against South Africa and West Indies ===
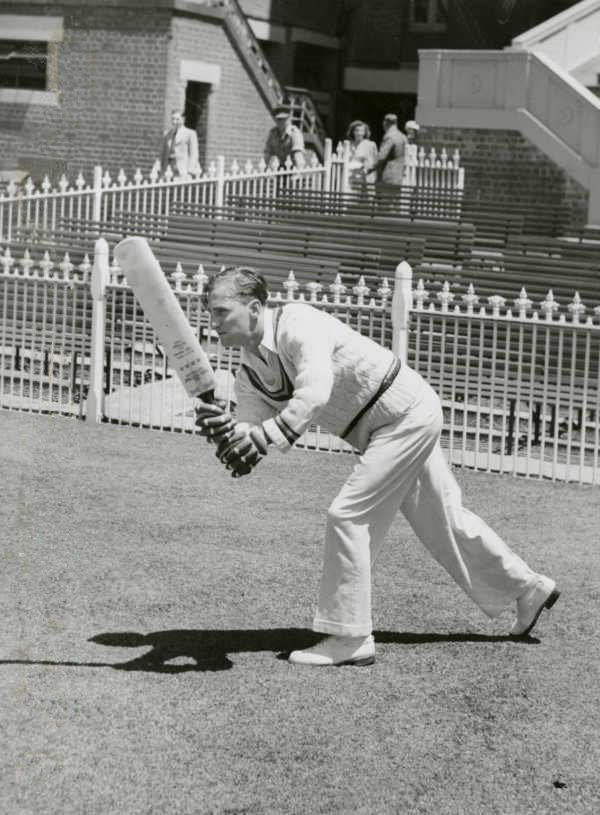
Hutton in 1947

Hutton's tonsils were removed before the start of the 1947 season but his poor health continued, forcing him to miss some games at the start of the season. Nevertheless, his form remained good and he scored four centuries in early matches. Yorkshire dropped to equal seventh in the County Championship, affected by the retirement of key players and the frequent loss of Hutton to representative cricket. In the Test matches Hutton did not initially score heavily. His highest innings after three Tests was only 24 runs, and critics called his place into question. He returned to form during the fourth Test, his first at Headingley, with a four-and-a-half-hour century on a difficult pitch for batting. Hutton scored 83 and 36 in the drawn final Test, and England won the series 3–0 with the other two games drawn. Hutton hit 344 runs in the Test series at an average of 44.00; in all first-class matches, he scored eleven centuries and totalled 2,585 runs at an average 64.62, although his achievements that season were overshadowed by those of Denis Compton and Bill Edrich, who both broke the previous record for most runs scored in a season.

After 16 months of continuous cricket, Hutton chose to miss the 1947–48 winter MCC tour of the West Indies. However, injuries severely affected that team, and its captain Gubby Allen requested reinforcements. Subsequently, Hutton flew out to join the tour; Immediately after he arrived, having travelled for four days, Hutton played against British Guiana, scoring 138 and 62 not out, before appearing in the third Test. After a century against Jamaica, Hutton played innings of 56 and 60 in the fourth and final Test, giving him 171 runs at an average of 42.75 in the series. He came top of the first-class averages for the tourists, with 578 runs at an average of 64.22, and was judged by Wisden as one of the few batting successes in a team which lost the four-Test series 2–0 and failed to win a single match on tour.

=== Struggles against pace ===
During 1948, Hutton scored heavily for Yorkshire. Despite missing more than half the County Championship matches, he scored more runs at a better average than anyone else in the side. In county matches, Hutton averaged 92.05 and scored eight centuries. Some Yorkshire critics expressed concern at the team's dependence on Hutton and the poor performance of other batsmen. Hutton's main challenge that season came from the Australian side which toured England undefeated and won the Test series 4–0. In the early part of the tour, the Australians, and particularly the pace bowlers Lindwall and Miller, tried to shake Hutton's confidence by targeting him. Although Hutton failed on a difficult pitch in Yorkshire's match against the tourists, he was the only successful batsman against them when he appeared for MCC shortly after.

Hutton was selected for the first Test, but England were overwhelmed by the Australian fast bowlers and lost the match. After a failure in the first innings, Hutton scored 74 in the second, and briefly established dominance over Miller, who responded with a series of bouncers, one of which struck Hutton on the shoulder and provoked an angry reaction from the crowd. Miller bowled him in very poor light at the start of the fourth day's play. At Lord's in the second Test, also lost by England, Hutton scored 20 and 13, but of more concern to critics was the manner in which he batted. In the second innings, England had to bat for a long time to save the game, Wisden noted that Hutton, in contrast to his opening partner Washbrook, looked "plainly uncomfortable". He was nearly dismissed several times before he was out for 13, and returned to the pavilion to an uncomfortable silence from the crowd. The former Australian batsman Jack Fingleton, covering the tour as a journalist, described it as Hutton's worst effort in a Test. Bill O'Reilly, another former Australian player working as a journalist, said Hutton seemed to be struggling with concentration and was a shadow of his former self.

Following his struggles at Lord's, Hutton was omitted from the team for the third Test. Observers had noticed Hutton backing away from the fast bowlers, which the English selectors saw as a poor example from a leading batsman. The decision generated considerable acrimony, but surprised and pleased the Australians, who felt Hutton was their most formidable opponent with the bat. Press and critics generally judged the omission a mistake, although the Wisden correspondent believed the decision to be correct as Hutton benefited from a break. In later years, Norman Yardley, the England captain, agreed that the choice was a poor one. Hutton, who escaped most of the debate by playing in Scotland for Yorkshire, found the situation unsettling and Patrick Murphy, a sports journalist, writes that it "served to drive a reserved man further in on himself." Meanwhile, Hutton was chosen to captain the Players against the Gentlemen at Lord's; he scored 59 and 132 not out.

Recalled to the England team for the fourth Test at Headingley, Hutton scored 81 and 57. Given an excellent reception by his home crowd, he shared a century opening partnership with Washbrook in both innings, the second time they had accomplished this feat. Critics considered Hutton to be a better batsman when he returned and that these innings repaired his damaged reputation. Australia needed 404 to win on a pitch favouring spin, but the poor performances of the main bowlers allowed Australia to record a seven wicket win described by Wisden as "astonishing". Hutton's contribution to the second Australian innings was to bowl four overs and concede 30 runs. Australia's dominance in the series was sealed by a crushing win in the fifth Test. England were bowled out for 52 runs in the first innings, of which Hutton scored 30 before being last out to an exceptional catch down the leg side from wicketkeeper Don Tallon. Wisden described Hutton as "the one exception to complete failure", while other critics noted he always looked comfortable. Facing a huge deficit in their second innings, England were bowled out for 188. Hutton scored 64, playing a similar defensive role to his first innings. In the Test series, Hutton scored 342 runs at an average of 42.75. In all first-class matches, he reached 2,654 runs at an average of 64.73.

=== Leading batsman again ===
Hutton toured South Africa in the winter of 1948–49 with the MCC under the captaincy of George Mann. Wisden described Hutton's tour as a succession of triumphs until he tired at the end: "Hutton's driving aroused the greatest admiration, but all his strokes were stamped with the hallmark of class." Before the Test matches began, Hutton scored three centuries and then contributed 83 as England won the first Test. The next three Tests were drawn. In the second match, Hutton and Washbrook set a new Test match record opening partnership. In easy batting conditions, they shared 359 runs on the first day before Hutton was out for 158 after almost five hours batting. In more favourable bowling conditions in the third Test, Hutton scored 41 and 87, followed by 123 in the fourth game which settled England's second innings at a dangerous time. England won the final game to take the series 2–0, and Hutton finished the Test series with 577 runs at an average of 64.11, while in all first-class matches he recorded 1,477 runs at an average of 73.85.

The most successful season of Hutton's career in terms of runs scored was 1949; he scored 3,429 runs at an average of 68.58, the fourth highest aggregate of runs in an English season. In both June and August he scored over 1,000 runs; his 1,294 runs in June was a record for a single month and only Herbert Sutcliffe had previously passed 1,000 runs for a calendar month twice in a season. He scored a double century against Lancashire, only the second for a Yorkshire batsman in the fixture. With Hutton available for more matches than in the previous few seasons, Yorkshire shared the County Championship with Middlesex, their last success until 1959. In the four Test matches against the touring New Zealanders, all of which were drawn, Hutton scored 469 runs at an average of 78.16. He scored 101 in the first Test, and fifties in the second and third matches, before ending the series with an innings of 206 in the fourth Test, in which the second hundred runs took only 85 minutes.

Hutton scored 2,049 runs at an average of 56.91 in the 1950 season. Batting effectively on a succession of early season rain-affected wickets, Hutton frequently top-scored for Yorkshire. Hutton's benefit match against Middlesex was affected by rain, but other events, collections and insurance for loss of play gave Hutton £9,713, a record at that point for a Yorkshire cricketer. Two-thirds of the amount was invested on Hutton's behalf by the Yorkshire committee, following their usual practice; Hutton resented this paternalism from the committee, particularly as he did not receive the full amount until 1972. Hutton played in three of the four Tests against West Indies. In the first Test, hampered by a finger injury, he scored 39 and 45 as England recorded their only victory of the series. The West Indies won the second Test, their first Test victory in England, and won the final two Tests to take the series 3–1; Hutton missed the third Test with lumbago but in the fourth Test scored 202 not out, carrying his bat through England's first innings. The West Indian spinners Sonny Ramadhin and Alf Valentine caused difficulties for all the batsmen except Hutton, who always appeared comfortable. Wisden praised his effort as unforgettable.

=== Australia 1950–51 ===
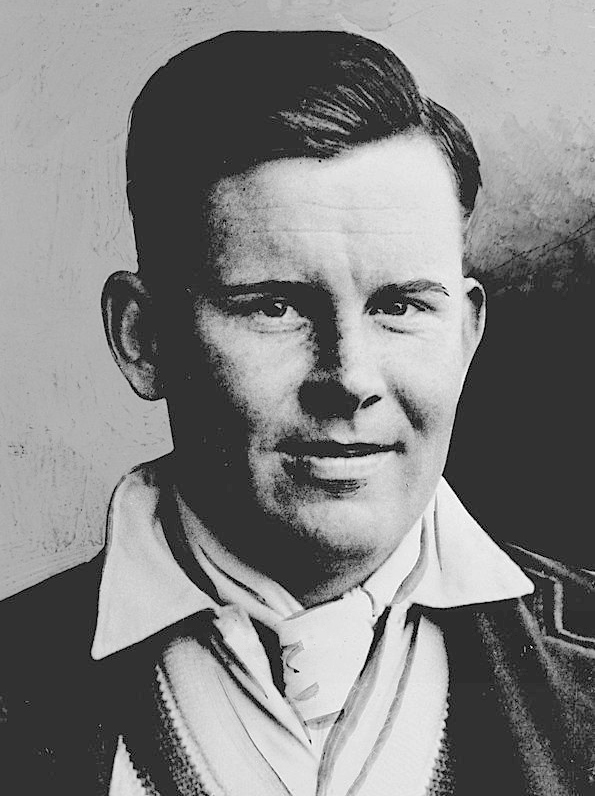
Freddie Brown, who led the MCC team in Australia in 1950–51, was Hutton's predecessor as England captain.

Hutton was chosen to go on the MCC tour of Australia in 1950–51, under the captaincy of the amateur Freddie Brown. The latter was an unexpected choice as captain, after a struggle to find a suitable amateur for the role. (Note: At the time, England captains were always amateur cricketers.) As a compromise aimed at critics who favoured the appointment of a professional captain, the professional Denis Compton was made vice-captain, but Brown came to rely more on Hutton than on Compton for advice. The tour selectors, in an attempt to strengthen the batting line-up, asked Hutton to bat in the middle order rather than his usual position as opener. He batted well in the early games but the team struggled. In the first Test, England dismissed Australia for 228 before rain made the pitch difficult for batting. In reply, England collapsed to 68 for seven before Brown declared to make Australia bat again while the pitch was still treacherous. Australia in turn struggled to 32 for seven, before declaring to leave England needing 193 to win. By the end of the third day's play, victory seemed unlikely as England were 30 for six. Next morning on a slightly easier pitch, Hutton scored 62 not out, an innings which was widely acclaimed in the press. Wisden observed that he had "given yet another exhibition of his wonderful batsmanship on tricky turf ... Hutton thrashed the fast bowlers majestically and played the turning or lifting ball with the ease of a master craftsman." However, the team were bowled out for 122 and Australia won by 70 runs.

Hutton remained in the middle order for the second Test, which England lost by 28 runs, but resumed his role as opener for the rest of the tour and scored a century in the following state game. Hutton scored 62 in the third Test, but the Australian spinner Jack Iverson, who caused the touring batsmen huge problems all series, bowled Australia to victory. Hutton's form continued in the fourth Test as he carried his bat for the second time in six months. Wisden observed: "Against Hutton the bowling looked almost mediocre, but most of the other batsmen made it appear lethal." He scored 156 not out and added 45 more runs in the second innings, but Australia won by 274 runs. With the series lost, England won the final game, their first victory over Australia since the war and Australia's first defeat in 26 matches; Hutton contributed scores of 79 and 60 not out and struck the winning run. Hutton scored 553 Test runs at an average of 88.83, and in all first-class matches accumulated 1,199 runs with five centuries and an average of 70.52. In contrast to his previous Australian tour, Hutton played the short ball comfortably. Reviewing the tour, Wisden stated, "With Hutton, figures did not lie. He stood head and shoulders above every other batsman and, taking all factors into consideration, worthily earned the description of the finest present-day batsman in the world."

=== 100th century ===
Hutton scored 2,145 runs in 1951 with nine centuries, including his 100th in first-class cricket. The South Africans toured England, losing the Test series 3–1. After Hutton scored fifty in the first Test, which was won by South Africa, his 100th century almost came during the third Test, when he scored an unbeaten 98 in the second innings to take England to victory. But the innings provoked controversy when Hutton's teammates seemed to decline easy runs to allow Hutton the opportunity to reach his hundred before the end of the match, thereby jeopardising England's chances of victory in unsettled weather. The 100th century came a week later, against Surrey, when Hutton became the thirteenth player to achieve the landmark. He followed this immediately with 194 not out against Nottinghamshire and 100, in the drawn fourth Test at Headlingley. In the final Test, which England won to take the series, Hutton became the first man in Tests, and only the fourth in all first-class cricket, to be given out obstructing the field: he edged a ball in the air and legitimately knocked it away from his wickets with his bat; in doing so, he prevented a catch being taken and was given out. This remains the only such instance in Tests. Hutton ended the Test series with 378 runs at an average of 54.00. Late in the season, he scored a century against Gloucestershire to become the second Yorkshire player after Sutcliffe to complete centuries against the other 16 first-class counties.

== Captain of England ==
=== Appointment ===
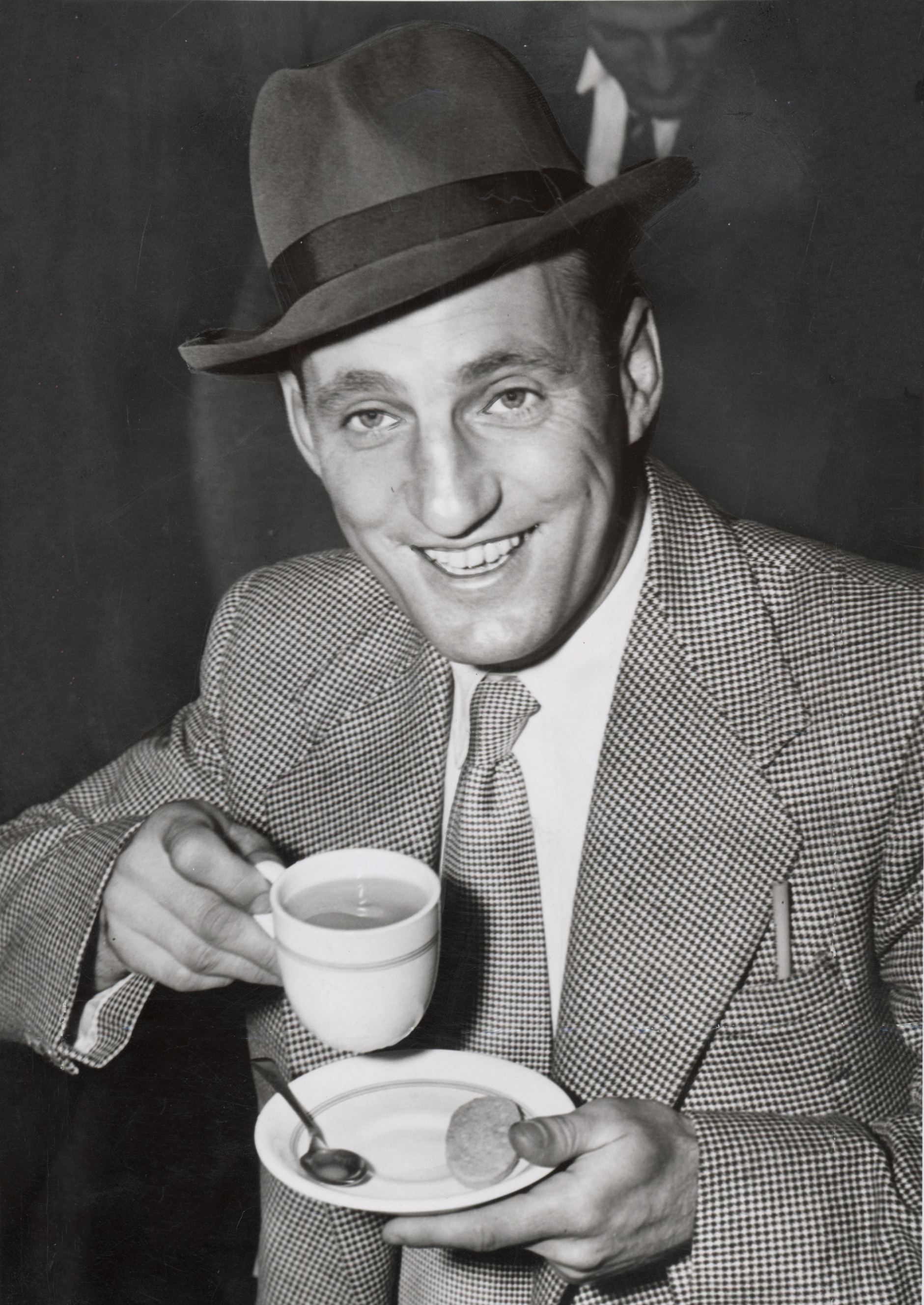
Hutton in Australia in 1951

Brown's resignation from the captaincy of England at the end of 1951 left no obvious replacement candidate. Traditionally, captains in county or Test cricket were amateurs, who usually came from privileged backgrounds, in contrast to professionals, who often came from the working classes. Consequently, class distinction pervaded cricket which was organised and administered by former and current amateurs, many of whom reasoned that professionals would not make good captains owing to their worries over safeguarding their contracts or concerns about affecting the livelihoods of other professionals. In 1952, the selectors judged that none of the serving amateur county captains possessed the required ability or experience to fill the role of England captain. Consequently, the selectors decided to radically depart from tradition and appoint a professional captain. All previous England captains in home Test matches had been amateurs, and no professional had captained England in any match in the 20th century. But, as widely anticipated by the press, Hutton was appointed to captain England in the first Test of a four-match series against the 1952 Indian tourists. He harboured private doubts whether the cricket establishment would accept a professional captain, but declined to turn amateur, as Wally Hammond had done in 1938. The decision met with broad approval from the press, and the editor of Wisden wrote: "In breaking with tradition and choosing a professional as captain the Selection Committee made a vital decision in the interests of England, because it should mean that in future no man will be picked as leader unless he is worth a place in the side." Hutton had not expected to be asked and had thought an amateur would have been appointed as usual. He presumed his appointment was an interim measure until a more suitable candidate could be found.

Before his home crowd at Headingley, Hutton's first match as captain was a success, although his tactics were cautious. The Wisden correspondent wrote: "For Hutton the match was a personal triumph. Tradition had been broken ... and he must have known that the eyes of the world were upon him. He did not falter and his astute leadership earned him many admirers". England won comfortably, although Hutton failed with the bat. In the second Test, Hutton scored 150 out of a total of 537, and although cautious once more, the Wisden editor believed his captaincy helped to secure a win. Following this match, the selectors appointed Hutton captain for the rest of the series. In the final two Tests, Hutton scored 104 and 86 and his bowlers dominated the Indian batsmen. The drawn final Test was ruined by weather, but England won the four match series 3–0, and Hutton scored 399 runs at an average of 79.80; in the whole summer he scored 2,567 first-class runs at an average of 61.11 with eleven centuries.

=== Ashes victory ===
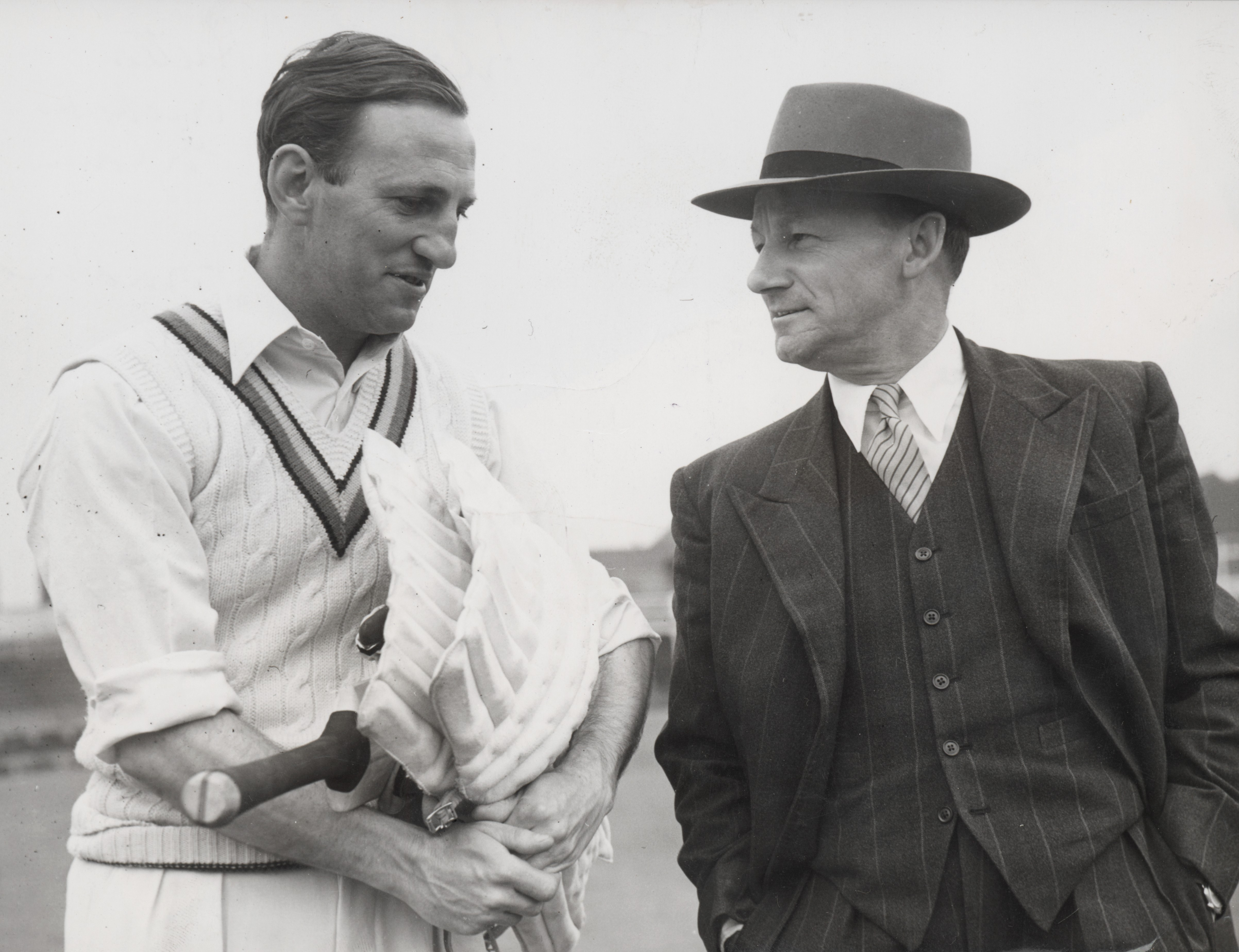
Hutton and Bradman at a 1953 test

During the 1953 season, Australia toured England having held the Ashes since 1934 but critics considered England to have a good chance of winning the series. Hutton was retained as England captain initially on a match-by-match basis. His health was uncertain and he was troubled by fibrositis which restricted his movement and adversely affected his fielding. He top-scored in both England innings with 43 and 60 not out in the drawn first Test, and batted effectively for Yorkshire against the Australians. After dropping three catches in Australia's first innings in the second Test, Hutton scored 145 runs in his first innings. However, he was dismissed early in the second innings; England managed to draw the match, but Hutton faced press criticism for his cautious tactics. Rain prevented a result in the third Test, but Hutton scored 66 and his tactics were praised. After the match, he was confirmed as captain for the remainder of the series, and the forthcoming MCC winter tour of West Indies.

The fourth Test, in front of Hutton's home crowd, was his least successful of the series. He was bowled second ball by a yorker from Lindwall and England struggled to remain competitive throughout the match. In the fourth innings of the game, Australia needed 177 runs to win, with 115 minutes of play remaining. Hutton used Trevor Bailey to bowl negatively and slow Australia down; his tactics, including time-wasting and the use of leg theory, meant Australia could not score the runs in the available time and the match was drawn. It is possible that the idea came from Bailey himself, but the Australian press criticised Hutton for his negativity. In contrast, English critics believed the tactics were justified. Amid great public interest for the deciding fifth Test, Hutton lost his fifth successive toss but replying to Australia's first innings of 275, England established a narrow first-innings lead. Surviving an early scare when a bouncer from Lindwall nearly knocked his cap onto his wickets, Hutton scored 82. In reply, Australia collapsed before the England spinners and England scored the necessary 132 runs to win their first series against Australia since 1932–33 and their first such home series win since 1926. Wisden praised Hutton's strategy and tactical sense, and he was widely acclaimed in the press, particularly for the good spirit which he and Hassett, the Australian captain, maintained. Hutton scored 443 runs at an average of 55.37 in the Tests, but found it mentally tiring to lead England. Meanwhile, some Yorkshire observers felt he should do more to improve discipline at the county. In the whole summer, he scored 2,458 runs at an average of 63.02.

=== Captain in the West Indies ===
In the winter of 1953–54, Hutton led the MCC on a tour of West Indies. Before the team left England, critics queried his appointment, arguing that a professional captain was unsuitable to lead a tour. Hutton's authority was also compromised by the MCC, who did not give him the tour manager he requested; instead, they appointed the inexperienced Charles Palmer, the Leicestershire captain, who had already been selected as a player on the tour. Palmer's dual role as player and manager blurred the lines of command. Hutton also found some of the professionals in the team to be difficult to lead, particularly Godfrey Evans, and Fred Trueman. Off-field events often overshadowed the cricket. Amid growing independence movements in the region, Hutton believed his team was used as a political instrument to support colonial rule. The situation was further inflamed as journalists and English residents in the Caribbean placed great emphasis on an English victory, and the perception was that the series would establish the unofficial world champions. The standards of local umpiring were a further source of controversy. The crowds often made noisy protests about on-field events, often related to umpiring. The climax came in the third Test when missiles were thrown onto the outfield when the umpire judged Cliff McWatt was out; Hutton kept his team and the umpires on the field, possibly defusing a dangerous situation. The attitude of some English players inflamed feelings, either through a perceived lack of courtesy, or their negative reactions to events on the field. Some critics held Hutton responsible for this, but the editor of Wisden later wrote: "[Hutton] was involved in the most thankless task any cricket captain has undertaken when he went to West Indies. Instead of finding a friendly cricket atmosphere he and his players were subjected to the impact of deep political and racial feeling—an experience all of them wish to forget. A few members of the team did not hide their innermost feelings, with the result that Hutton came under severe criticism, although his behaviour was blameless."

Hutton wanted to exploit what he saw as a West Indian weakness against pace, picking four fast bowlers for the first Test. In doing so, he misjudged the pitch; West Indies made a large score and won by 140 runs. Both captains employed time-wasting tactics in the match, and used negative leg theory bowling, outside leg stump. In the second Test, Hutton scored 72 and 77 but could not prevent another defeat after losing his seventh consecutive toss in Tests. England batted slowly throughout; Hutton was himself barracked for his slow, defensive batting during the match. England won the third Test by nine wickets, their first victory in the Caribbean since 1935. Hutton, who finally won the toss, scored 169 in seven hours and West Indies were bowled out twice. After a drawn fourth Test, England had to win the final Test to draw the series. Hutton lost the toss but his bowlers dismissed West Indies cheaply in good batting conditions. Hutton then batted for almost nine hours to score 205, his nineteenth and final Test century. Wisden observed that "For concentration and control, Hutton's innings ... scarcely could have been excelled." The innings ended amid another controversy when local officials and journalists accused Hutton of snubbing the congratulations of the Chief Minister Alexander Bustamante during a tea interval. Hutton apologised, not having noticed Bustamante speaking to him, but was dismissed immediately when play resumed; the incident was prominently reported the following day. England's bowlers bowled out West Indies a second time and England scored the required runs to record a series-levelling victory, West Indies' first defeat in Jamaica in a Test. In its summary of the tour, Wisden said that Hutton showed mastery over every bowler. The correspondent wrote, "From first to last no batsman compared with Hutton ... Considering the weight of his many responsibilities and worries, Hutton played magnificent cricket". The press were generally supportive despite reservations over his caution. Swanton and Alan Gibson later credited England's recovery in the series to Hutton's batting and leadership. In five Tests, he scored 677 runs—his largest aggregate in a series—at an average of 96.71, the highest on either side. In all first-class matches, he made 780 runs at an average of 78.00.

=== Appointment of Sheppard ===
Hutton missed large parts of the 1954 season on medical advice, suffering from mental and physical exhaustion brought about by the West Indian tour. He played in the first Test against Pakistan, on their first tour of England, scored a duck and missed the next two matches. In Hutton's absence, the selectors appointed the amateur David Sheppard, a theology student at the time; Sheppard achieved little batting success, but England won one of the two Tests in which he was captain. According to Wisden editor Norman Preston, influential figures within the cricket hierarchy blamed Hutton for the previous winter's events and attempted to replace him as captain. Two former England cricketers, Errol Holmes and Walter Robins, the latter also a selector that year, favoured Sheppard over Hutton and persuaded him to offer his candidacy to captain the MCC in Australia that winter. Sheppard indicated he would accept the post and take a leave of absence from his studies if required. The press speculated that Hutton would step aside, but most newspapers favoured his continued leadership and ran stories alleging MCC prejudice against professional cricketers. Neither Hutton nor Sheppard publicly expressed an opinion, although Hutton informed the MCC he would tour Australia as captain or player as required, and both men remained on good personal terms throughout. (Note: Following Hutton's death in 1990, Sheppard, then the Bishop of Liverpool, gave the address at a memorial service at York Minster.) Robins, seeing the strength of opinion, backed down. When Hutton returned to cricket in July, scoring two centuries, he was appointed captain of the MCC for the winter tour. Returning to captain a slightly weakened team for the fourth and final Test, Hutton failed with the bat, and Pakistan recorded their first Test victory. In his three Test innings of the season, Hutton scored just 19 runs. Owing to his reduced appearances, Hutton failed to reach 1,000 first-class runs for the first time since 1936, reaching 912 runs at an average of 35.07.

=== Captain in Australia ===
Expectations before the Australian tour were low after the confusion of the 1954 summer and some controversial selections. Trueman, Jim Laker and Tony Lock, part of the winning 1953 team, were omitted; Colin Cowdrey and Vic Wilson were included. Hutton further downplayed his team's chances through exaggerating its inexperience to the Australian press; newspapers were already sympathetic to Hutton as a professional captain of a class-driven country. The team began the tour well. Hutton made a series of good scores in the opening games. But for the first Test, Hutton did not include a spinner in the team and chose to bowl on winning the toss, an unusual strategy in Australia. The home side scored 601, England dropped 12 catches and, with the key players Evans and Compton injured, lost by an innings; the press blamed Hutton for choosing to bowl. Despite the result, Hutton saw potential in Frank Tyson's bowling and arranged for Alf Gover, a respected coach who was in Australia as a journalist, to improve and shorten Tyson's run to the wicket. For the second Test, Hutton left out the unfit Alec Bedser, England's most reliable bowler since the war, to include two spinners, but in a low-scoring game, Tyson made the difference and England won by 38 runs. Hutton was unwell before the third Test, suffering from fibrositis and a heavy cold, and had to be persuaded out of bed by members of his team. He decided to play at the last minute and unexpectedly left out Bedser again, although he was fit to play. Hutton neglected to inform Bedser, who only learned of his omission when he saw the team list displayed in the dressing room before the match. Hutton contributed few runs, but Cowdrey and Peter May made large scores and Tyson took seven wickets as Australia were bowled out for 111 in their second innings, giving England a 128-run victory. The fourth Test was crucial, and Hutton's innings of 80 runs in four-and-a-half hours was the highest of the game. Wisden believed Hutton's tactics were instrumental in giving his team the upper hand, and in the final innings, England needed 94 to win and retain the Ashes. Early wickets, including Hutton's, fell to Miller, and when the captain returned to the dressing room, he said that Miller had "done us again." Compton, the next man in, replied "I haven't been in yet", and stayed at the wicket until the match was won by five wickets. Many commentators viewed this as a sign that Hutton's reserve had slipped in the critical situation, but Alan Gibson believes it was a deliberate ploy to inspire Compton. England went on to draw the final Test in a match ruined by rain. Hutton was out to the fourth ball of the match, but Australia were forced to follow on for the first time by England since 1938, and Hutton took a wicket with the last ball of the match before time ran out. This ended the series, which England won 3–1.

Hutton's tactical approach in the series was praised by Australian and English commentators; they noted how Hutton observed his opponents carefully to spot weaknesses. His caution was criticised, but the main complaint was that he deliberately slowed the speed of play, reducing the number of overs bowled, allowing the fast bowlers to rest and restricting the rate at which Australia scored. With the bat, Hutton scored 220 runs in Tests at an average of 24.44. In all first-class matches in Australia, he scored 959 runs at 50.47. The tour ended with two Tests in New Zealand; England won the first by eight wickets, and the second by an innings and 20 runs. New Zealand were bowled out for 26 in their second innings, which, in 2018, remains the lowest Test score. In the latter match, Hutton scored 53 batting at number five in his final Test innings. He had played in 79 Test matches, scoring 6,971 runs at an average of 56.67 with 19 hundreds. As England captain in 23 matches, he won eight Tests and lost four, and along with Percy Chapman was the only England captain to win consecutive series against Australia.

=== Retirement ===
On Hutton's return to England, he was made an honorary member of the MCC, which changed its rules to allow a current professional to join the club. The selectors appointed him England captain for the entire forthcoming series against South Africa, a rare indication of confidence. (Note: Usually, captains were appointed for one or two matches; the only previous captain to be appointed for a whole summer was C. B. Fry in 1912.) After a poor start to the season, Hutton captained MCC against the tourists, but withdrew from the final day of the match with lumbago. His uncertain health led him to resign the England captaincy. The selectors made Peter May captain in his place and appointed Hutton as a selector. Hutton played for Yorkshire until the end of June. Against Nottinghamshire, he scored 194 in five hours, his final first-class century. His last 100 runs came in an hour. After the following match, his back was too painful to continue and he did not play again that season. In eleven first-class matches, he scored 537 runs at an average of 29.83. In June, he was knighted for services to cricket. Following the advice of a specialist, Hutton announced his retirement from first-class cricket in January 1956. He was 39, an early retirement age for the period. He played one further match in 1957 for MCC against Lancashire, and two matches in 1960 for MCC and L. C. Stevens' XI. In all first-class cricket, he scored 40,140 runs at an average of 55.51 with 129 hundreds.

== Style and technique ==
=== Batting ===
Wisden viewed Hutton, with Jack Hobbs, as "one of the two most accomplished professional batsmen to have played for his country", and following the Second World War, critics regarded him as the best batsman in the world. In October 2010, he was chosen as part of the ESPNCricinfo All-time World XI, a team selected by a panel of respected commentators and cricket writers to represent the greatest cricketers of all time. As part of the same process, he was also chosen in England's greatest team; The official Yorkshire history describes him as "technically and aesthetically the best batsman to play for Yorkshire". E. W. Swanton believed that if Hobbs was the greatest professional batsman, Hutton, along with Hammond and Compton, came next. Hutton was more cautious than these others. Following the lead of Herbert Sutcliffe, he saw the role of an opening batsman as defensive. The basis of his game was a good defensive technique, although he was able to accelerate and play attacking shots when the situation demanded.

Cricket historian David Frith believes that "there was an apparent touch of genius about his batsmanship", and Alan Gibson described Hutton's off drive as "the glory of the game." He was particularly effective on difficult batting pitches. Of the next generation of England batsmen, Peter May tried to adopt Hutton's mental approach to both batting and captaincy, while Colin Cowdrey later said "I had tried to model myself on Len Hutton ever since I started playing serious cricket." Statistically, Hutton stands near the highest achievers. When he retired, only two men had scored more than his 6,971 Test runs; his average of 56.67 is ninth highest of those who played at least fifty Test matches, while only Sutcliffe has a higher average among openers who scored over 4,000 runs. He also displayed consistency; his annual average only fell below 50 three times, he averaged over 50 each year from 1947 to 1954 and scored 20 or more in 90 of his 138 innings.

Hutton's batting technique was orthodox and conventional. John Woodcock writes that he seemed to possess great intuition, for example playing mystery spinners Ramadhin and Iverson with ease. His batting stance was relaxed and still, his first movement being to slide his right foot back and across towards middle stump. He often played the ball off the back foot, getting right back onto his stumps, but never played as far forward, preferring to let the ball come to him and play it late. Occasionally, he left a slight gap between his bat and pads, meaning he was sometimes bowled through it when out of form. This arose mainly through the wartime injury to his arm and by 1950 he had adjusted his technique to compensate and had fewer problems. Immediately before the war, Hutton batted in a more attacking style and several of his contemporaries remembered his attractive strokeplay. By his own admission, Hutton was not the same player after the war. A combination of the effects of his injury and the responsibility of opening the batting in generally weak Yorkshire and England teams, whose success often depended on Hutton, meant that he batted cautiously.

Hutton only played attacking shots when they presented no risk, and he rarely lifted the ball in the air; he hit just seven sixes in Test matches. However, Patrick Murphy writes: "Just now and again he would play an innings of genius, when bowlers could not contain him." One such innings was his score of 37 in the second Test of 1946–47 in which the attacking shots he played reminded older spectators of Victor Trumper, regarded as the ultimate Australian strokeplayer. In all his innings, he was expert at hitting the ball just out of the reach of fieldsmen to allow runs to be taken. Several of his contemporaries believed he did not get enough credit for surviving the short-pitched attacks of the Australian bowlers following the war.

=== Captaincy ===
Achievement and fulfilment were all-in-all to Hutton ... His cricket was never meant to be a joyride, yet he was not a joyless man without humour. His own brand was never far away and might be seen in the twinkle in his blue eyes, a warm smile, in his delphic utterances and enigmatic remarks.

— Gerald Howat in the Oxford Dictionary of National Biography

As captain, Hutton believed that the key to success was a strong pace attack, stemming from his experiences against Lindwall and Miller, which influenced his selection of several promising fast bowlers. His natural inclination and the background to his appointment made him a cautious captain, for example slowing down the game to allow the fast bowlers to rest, which set a precedent for other captains. Tactically, Norman Yardley found him "sound rather than venturesome". Run saving was his main priority, but during matches, he quickly adjusted his approach to attack the weakness of particular batsmen. Jim Kilburn believed that Hutton pursued a serious approach to all matches, to the point where he missed some enjoyment of the game. Kilburn wrote that the "outstanding characteristic of his captaincy was shrewdness. He made no romantic gestures; he lit no fires of inspiration. He invited admiration rather than affection and would have exchanged either or both for effective obedience."

Some of his selections as captain were widely debated. Following incidents in the Caribbean, Trueman did not play for England again under Hutton's captaincy, although he was still regarded as an England prospect. Jim Laker was also omitted from the team, possibly because Hutton doubted Laker's commitment. Both Jim McConnon, Laker's replacement, and Vic Wilson were controversial choices for the 1954–55 Australian tour, whose selections Trevor Bailey attributed to Hutton; neither played a substantial role on the tour. A poor communicator, Hutton distanced himself from his team when a stronger lead was required. Trueman and Bailey thought Hutton found it hard to talk to his players: amateur critics considered this an inevitable consequence of a professional leading other professionals. On the other hand, Hutton played a key role in the development of fast bowlers Trueman, Tyson and Brian Statham. Tyson and Statham later acknowledged his advice and encouragement as factor in their subsequent success. Cowdrey also acknowledged Hutton's advice and assistance when the former began his career. Furthermore, on the 1954–55 tour of Australia, Hutton took a close interest in him and was a particular comfort when Cowdrey's father died during the tour.

Cricket followers from the south of England remained slightly distrustful of Hutton owing to the perception that he occasionally carried professionalism to excess. When he was appointed England captain, many in the cricketing establishment held his professionalism against him with the result that Hutton never felt comfortable dealing with the amateurs who ran English cricket at the time. While captain, he was criticised for caution and negativity but also was expected to lead a successful team at a time when results began to assume a far greater importance than in previous years. Consequently, Hutton never felt secure in the position and was often uncomfortable around the amateur establishment. Like Herbert Sutcliffe, he attempted to alter his accent to match that of leading southern amateurs to help him to fit in. But he did not enjoy the attention that went with the captaincy, and he often worried about the impression he was making.

Hutton rarely captained Yorkshire, except in the absence of the official captain, through a combination of poor health, frequent absences with England and the presence of the amateur Norman Yardley in the side. Yardley claimed several times that he would have stood down in Hutton's favour, but the committee remained distrustful of professional captaincy and thought Hutton a hypochondriac who used his health as an excuse not to play. Hutton was a reserved man for whom the Yorkshire dressing room clashes of the 1950s held little appeal. As the side's senior professional, he did not always provide the guidance which younger players in the side were seeking. The team was divided and the players frequently clashed with each other; some critics believe this was a factor in the county's failure to win the County Championship in the 1950s. Ray Illingworth, a player at the time, believes that Hutton was the only man who could have changed the negative attitude around the team, but "he didn't do anything about it". Illingworth recalled that he was a "distant hero", saying: "He was a funny man was Len—slightly sarcastic all the time. He'd hear an argument in the dressing room and he'd throw a bit of wood on the fire to keep it going. He looked after himself, he was very much of a loner."

== Later life ==
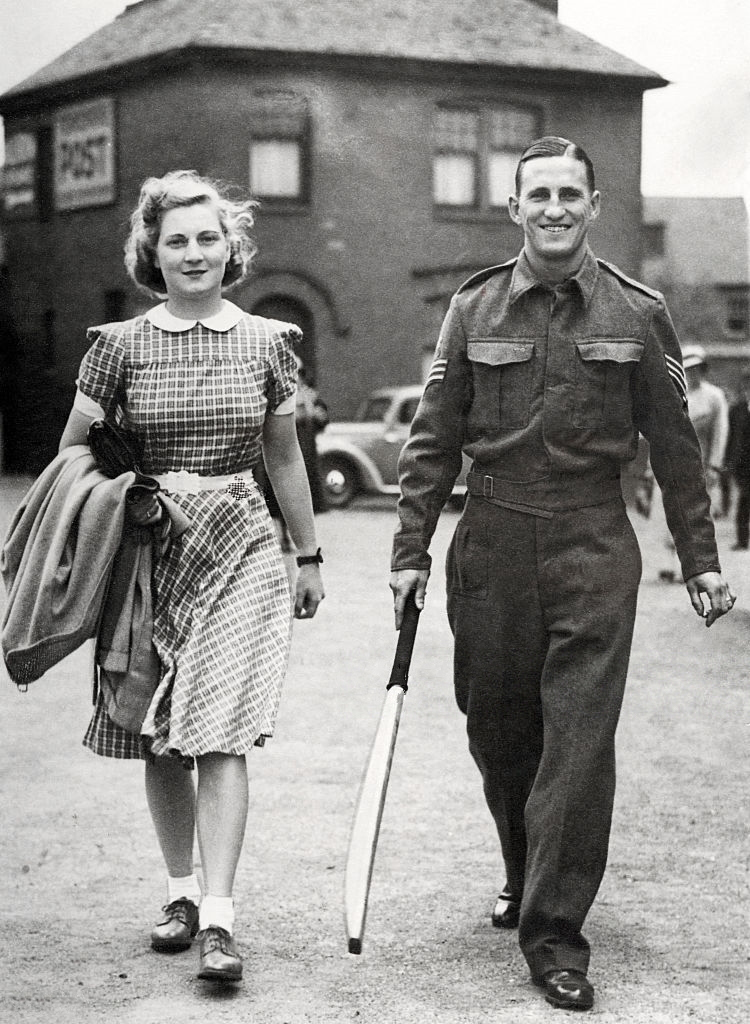
Hutton with wife c. 1945

Hutton married Dorothy Mary Dennis, the sister of former Yorkshire cricketer Frank Dennis, on 16 September 1939 at Wykeham near Scarborough; they met at an end-of-season dance which Dorothy had attended with her brother. They had two sons: Richard, who later played cricket for Yorkshire and England, in 1942, and John in 1947.

During and after the war, Hutton worked for a paper manufacturer, but writing and journalism provided a more permanent career. Hutton worked with Thomas Moult, a journalist and writer, to produce a book of memoirs, Cricket is My Life in 1949, and he wrote for the News of the World while still playing. Following his cricketing retirement, Hutton worked in broadcasting until 1961, and after 1955, he wrote for the London Evening News until 1963. A second book, Just my story, followed in 1956 in collaboration with journalist, R. J. Hayter. In 1958–59, Hutton travelled to Australia to cover the MCC tour as correspondent for the Evening News, again assisted by a professional journalist, while between 1963 and 1986, he wrote for The Observer. He wrote a third book, Thirty Years in Cricket, in 1984. Hutton's increasing commitments in the south of England meant he moved to North London in 1959. In 1960, Hutton was invited to join the engineering firm of J. H. Fenner, mainly working in a public relations capacity. Later, he moved into marketing and overseas promotion of products, became a director of the firm in 1973, and retired in 1984.

Although he disliked committees, Hutton served as an England Test selector in 1975 and 1976, but business commitments limited his availability so he resigned in 1977. Hutton became involved with Surrey cricket in later years but maintained links with Yorkshire, and became president of Yorkshire county cricket in January 1990. In his final years, Hutton suffered from ill health and became increasingly frail. In September 1990, he suffered a ruptured aorta shortly after watching a cricket match at the Oval. After an unsuccessful operation, he died on 6 September.

== Bibliography ==
- Birley, Derek (1999). A Social History of English Cricket. London: Aurum Press. ISBN 1-85410-941-3.
- Bowes, Bill (1949). Express Deliveries. London: Stanley Paul. OCLC 643924774.
- Chalke, Stephen; Hodgson, Derek (2003). No Coward Soul. The remarkable story of Bob Appleyard. Bath: Fairfield Books. ISBN 0-9531196-9-6.
- Fingleton, Jack (1985). Brightly Fades the Don. London: The Pavilion Library. ISBN 0-907516-82-3.
- Gibson, Alan (1979). The Cricket Captains of England. London: Cassell. ISBN 0-304-29779-8.
- Hill, Alan (2007). Herbert Sutcliffe. Cricket Maestro. Stroud: Stadia. ISBN 978-0-7524-4350-8.
- Hodgson, Derek (1989). The Official History of Yorkshire County Cricket Club. Ramsbury: The Crowood Press. ISBN 1-85223-274-9.
- Howat, Gerald (1988). Len Hutton. The Biography. London: Heinemann Kingswood. ISBN 0-434-98150-8.
- Marshall, Michael (1987). Gentlemen and Players: Conversations with Cricketers. London: Grafton Books. ISBN 0-246-11874-1.
- Murphy, Patrick (2009). The Centurions: From Grace to Ramprakash. Bath: Fairfield Books. ISBN 978-0-9560702-4-1.
- Swanton, EW (1999). Cricketers of My Time. London: Andre Deutsch. ISBN 0-233-99746-6.
- Woodcock, John (1991). "Sir Leonard Hutton". Wisden Cricketers' Almanack. London: John Wisden & Co. pp. 53–55. ISBN 0-947766-16-2.

Records
Preceded by Wally Hammond	World Record – Highest individual score in Test cricket 364 v. Australia at The Oval 1938	Succeeded by Garfield Sobers
