= Richard Hutton (cricketer) =

English cricketer

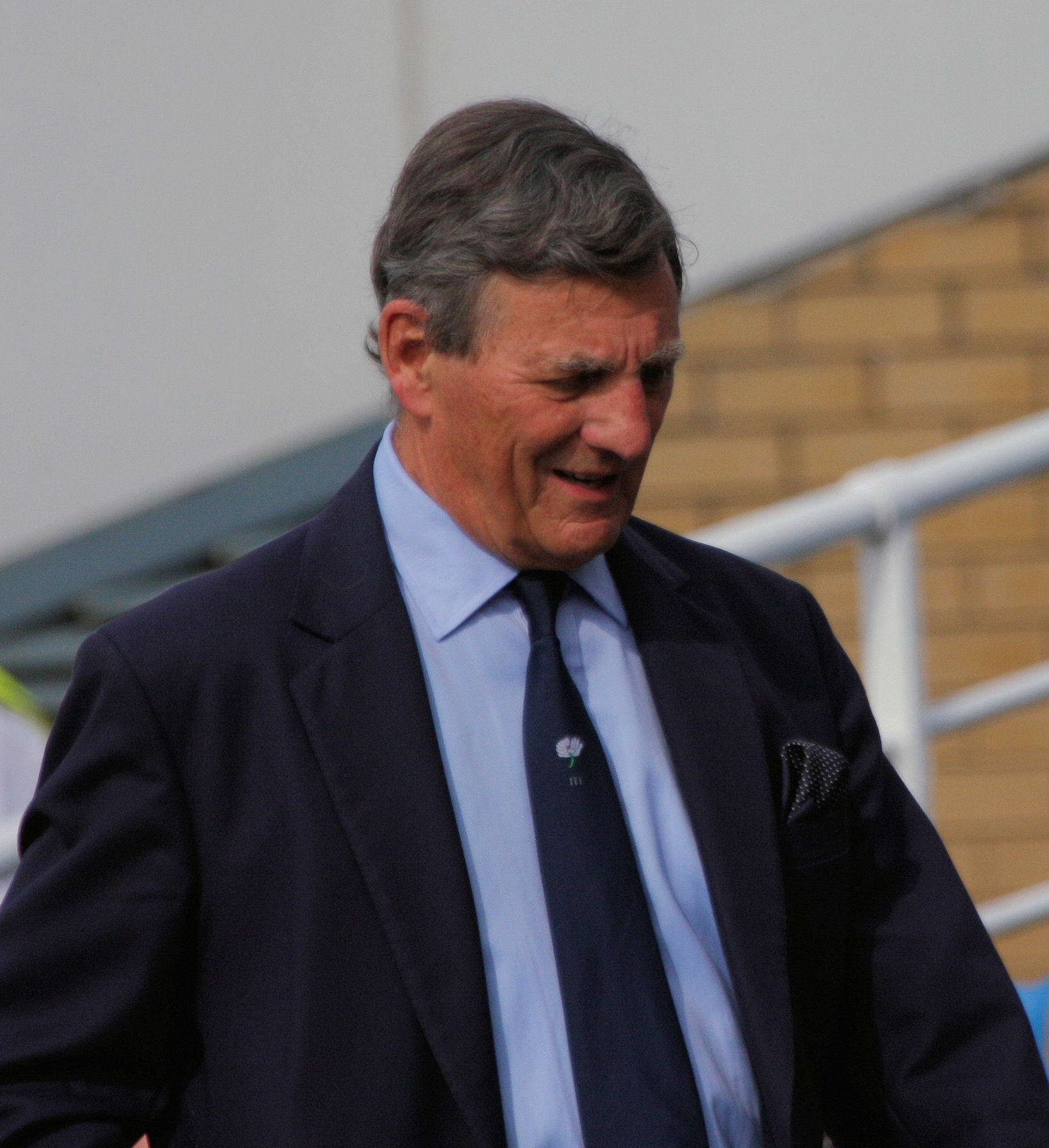
- Hutton in 2017

Personal information
- Full name: Richard Anthony Hutton
- Born: 6 September 1942 (age 84); Pudsey, Yorkshire, England
- Batting: Right-handed
- Bowling: Right-arm fast-medium
- Relatives: Len Hutton (father)

International information
- National side: England
- Test debut: 17 June 1971 v Pakistan
- Last Test: 19 August 1971 v India

Domestic team information
- Years: Team
- 1962–1964: Cambridge University
- 1962–1974: Yorkshire
- 1975/76: Transvaal

Career statistics
Competition	Tests	FC	LA
Matches	5	281	111
Runs scored	219	7,561	1,085
Batting average	36.50	21.48	18.70
100s/50s	0/2	5/29	0/4
Top score	81	189	65
Balls bowled	738	34,225	5,069
Wickets	9	625	133
Bowling average	28.55	24.01	23.58
5 wickets in innings	0	21	1
10 wickets in match	0	3	0
Best bowling	3/72	8/50	7/15
Catches/stumpings	9/–	216/–	28/–
- Source: CricInfo, 16 April 2019

Richard Anthony Hutton (born 6 September 1942) is a former English cricketer, who played in five Test matches for the England cricket team in 1971. A right-handed batsman and right-arm seam bowler, Hutton's bowling was probably his stronger discipline, but he was considered an all-rounder. He played first-class cricket for Yorkshire County Cricket Club. He is the son of cricketer Len Hutton, described by Wisden Cricketers' Almanack as "one of the greatest batsmen in the history of cricket."

== Life and career ==
He was educated at Repton School, where he developed a reputation as an all-round cricketer, and Christ's College, Cambridge, being awarded a blue at Cambridge. He played for Yorkshire from 1962 until 1974, and for Transvaal in South Africa.

Hutton made his Test debut in a drawn match against Pakistan in 1971, being promoted to open in the second innings and scoring 58 not out in his maiden Test innings. His highest Test score of 81 came in his last Test match, at The Oval against India. He shared a century partnership for the seventh wicket with the wicket-keeper Alan Knott, after the Indian spinners did some early damage. A surprise choice for the World XI tour of Australia in 1971–72, he struggled playing alongside the biggest names in international cricket.

In 1980–81, he toured Bangladesh with the Marylebone Cricket Club (MCC) team. Hutton had a spell as editor of The Cricketer magazine.

His father, Sir Leonard Hutton, captained England, while his elder son, Ben Hutton, captained Middlesex in 2005 and 2006. His brother, John, also appeared in first-class cricket.

== See also ==
- Marylebone Cricket Club cricket team in Bangladesh in 1980–81
