= Sadanand Mohol =

Indian cricketer (1938–2022)

Personal information
- Full name: Sadanand Namdeo Mohol
- Born: 6 October 1938; Bassein, Bombay Presidency, British India
- Died: 30 July 2022 (aged 83); Pune, Maharashtra, India
- Batting: Right-handed
- Bowling: Right-arm medium-fast

Domestic team information
- Years: Team
- 1959–60 to 1970–71: Maharashtra
- 1964–65 to 1966–67: West Zone
- 1966–67: Indian Starlets

Career statistics
Competition	First-class
Matches	45
Runs scored	535
Batting average	13.04
100s/50s	0/0
Top score	40
Balls bowled	10,032
Wickets	165
Bowling average	21.32
5 wickets in innings	9
10 wickets in match	2
Best bowling	8/42
Catches/stumpings	20/–
- Source: Cricket Archive, 2 December 2014

Sadanand Namdeo Mohol (6 October 1938 – 30 July 2022) was an Indian medium-fast bowler who played first-class cricket in India from 1960 to 1971. He toured England with the Indian team in 1967, but did not play Test cricket.

== Career ==
Mohol made his first-class debut for Maharashtra against Gujarat in the Ranji Trophy in 1959–60, taking six wickets, including 3 for 8 off 18.3 overs in the second innings. He established himself in the Maharashtra team in 1961–62. In 1962–63 his bowling was a major factor in Poona University's victory in the Rohinton Baria Trophy, the annual competition among the Indian universities. In Poona University's two outright victories in the semi-final and final he took 14 wickets for 150 off 122.3 overs, as well as making useful runs in the middle order.

In 1963–64 he opened the bowling for a team of young players, the Indian Board President's XI, against the touring MCC, taking two wickets. In 1964–65 he took 3 for 54 and 8 for 42 against Saurashtra. He opened the bowling for West Zone in a semi-final of the Duleep Trophy later that season, but was not selected for the final. In April 1966, in a first-class match staged to raise money for the National Defence Fund, he took four wickets in four balls.

He had his best season in 1966–67, taking 43 wickets in eight matches at an average of 19.27. He began the season with 7 for 23 for Indian Starlets against Hyderabad Cricket Association XI in the Moin-ud-Dowlah Gold Cup Tournament in October. In December he played for West Zone against the touring West Indians, taking 4 for 107 off 36 overs. A few days later he took 5 for 37 and 6 for 69 for Maharashtra against Saurashtra.

He was selected as one of the two specialist pace bowlers for the tour of England, along with Subrata Guha. India preferred to rely almost entirely on its spin bowlers, however, and Guha played only one of the three Tests and Mohol none at all. Mohol played in only seven of the 18 first-class matches, and apart from the match against Oxford University, when he took 5 for 39 off 34 overs, he had few chances to run into form before a leg injury hampered the later stages of his tour. He finished with 12 wickets at 20.00, and headed the team's first-class averages.

He began the 1967–68 season with 11 wickets in the first two matches in the Ranji Trophy, but he did not play again until the final stages of the Ranji Trophy in 1970–71. His last match was the final, when he took four wickets (match figures of 52–22–65–4) in Maharashtra's closely fought loss to Bombay.
