= Kishore Vasani =

Ugandan cricketer

Personal information
- Full name: Kishore Lalchani
- Born: Uganda Protectorate
- Batting: Unknown
- Bowling: Slow left-arm orthodox

Career statistics
Competition	First-class
Matches	3
Runs scored	31
Batting average	6.20
100s/50s	–/–
Top score	9*
Balls bowled	576
Wickets	7
Bowling average	40.71
5 wickets in innings	–
10 wickets in match	–
Best bowling	3/68
Catches/stumpings	2/–
- Source: Cricinfo, 21 September 2021

Kishore Vasani (date of birth unknown) was a Ugandan first-class cricketer.

Vasani played minor matches for Uganda from 1956 to 1970. In 1962 he played for East Africa in a minor match against an International XI at Nairobi, during which Basil D'Oliveira struck five sixes off of the bowling of Vasani or the Tanzania C. D. Patel. Vasani made his debut in first-class cricket for an East African Invitation XI against a touring Marylebone Cricket Club side at Kampala in 1963. He made a further two first-class appearances for the Kenyan Coast Cricket Association against a touring Pakistan International Airlines team at Mombasa in 1964, before featuring for East Africa against the touring Indians at Kampala in 1967. In three first-class matches, Vasani scored 31 runs with a highest score of 18, while with his slow left-arm orthodox bowling he took 7 wickets at an average of 40.71, with best figures of 3 for 68.
