= Deaths in January 2000 =

The following is a list of notable deaths in January 2000.

Entries for each day are listed alphabetically by surname. A typical entry lists information in the following sequence:

- Name, age, country of citizenship at birth, subsequent country of citizenship (if applicable), reason for notability, cause of death (if known), and reference.

== January 2000 ==
=== 1 ===
- Larry Bearnarth, 59, American Major League Baseball player (New York Mets, Milwaukee Brewers), heart attack.
- W. D. Borrie, 86, New Zealand-born Australian demographer and academic.
- Oliver Bowen, 57, Canadian engineer.
- George Carl, 83, American clown, cancer.
- Edward Gonzalez Carroll, 89, American bishop.
- Marcello Creti, 77, Italian inventor.
- Chon Day, 92, American cartoonist.
- Maurice Hallam, 68, English cricket player.
- Dick Pabich, 44, American gay rights activist, AIDS.
- Stan Patrick, 77, American NBA basketball player.
- Gerda Paumgarten, 92, Austrian alpine skier and world champion.
- Liu Songsheng, 83-84, Chinese Olympic footballer (1948).
- Andy Spognardi, 91, American baseball player (Boston Red Sox).
- Colin Vaughan, 68, Australian-Canadian television journalist, architect, and urban activist, heart attack.

=== 2 ===
- Gary Adams, 56, American salesman.
- Nat Adderley, 68, American jazz musician, stroke.
- Bill Armstrong, 67, American television game show announcer.
- Princess María de las Mercedes of Bourbon-Two Sicilies, 89, Spanish royal, mother of King Juan Carlos I, heart attack.
- George Cooper, 92, Australian cricketer.
- Sylvester Croom Sr., 73, American football player.
- Ed Doherty, 81, American football player and coach.
- Henri René Guieu, 73, French science fiction writer, cancer.
- Patrick O'Brian, 85, English author (Master and Commander).
- Ullin Place, 75, British philosopher and psychologist.
- Anna Maria Martínez Sagi, 92, Spanish poet, trade unionist, journalist, and feminist.
- Elmo Zumwalt, 79, United States Navy officer, cancer.

=== 3 ===
- Anita Aarons, 87, Australian-Canadian artist.
- Tony Aslangul, 76, Australian Olympic alpine skier (1956).
- June Brae, 82, British ballet dancer.
- Gabriela Brimmer, 52, Mexican writer and activist, heart attack.
- Isabel Cooley, 75, American actress.
- Harmonica Fats, 72, American blues harmonica player.
- Henry H. Fowler, 91, American lawyer and politician, Secretary of the Treasury, pneumonia.
- Viktor Kolotov, 50, Soviet/Ukrainian football player and Olympian (1972, 1976).
- Frank Miller, 83, Irish cricket player.

=== 4 ===
- Charles M. Allen, 83, American district judge (United States District Court for the Western District of Kentucky).
- Alex Bartolome, 41, Filipino rapist, execution by lethal injection.
- Alfred Bohrmann, 95, German astronomer.
- Tom Fears, 77, Mexican-American football player (Los Angeles Rams) and member of the Pro Football Hall of Fame, complications from Alzheimer's disease.
- Jaroslav Kadavý, 87, Czech Olympic skier (1948).
- Diether Krebs, 52, German actor, cabaret artist and comedian, lung cancer.
- Edward H. Kruse, 81, American politician, member of the United States House of Representatives (1949-1951).
- Spyros Markezinis, 90, Greek politician, Prime Minister.
- John Milner, 50, American baseball player (New York Mets, Pittsburgh Pirates, Montreal Expos), lung cancer.
- Louis Mucci, 90, American jazz trumpeter.
- Henry Pleasants, 89, American music critic and intelligence officer, ruptured aorta.
- Al Schrecker, 82, American basketball player.
- Keith Wallace, 38, British boxer and Olympian (1980), cancer.

=== 5 ===
- Turid Balke, 78, Norwegian actress, playwright and artist.
- Xie Bingying, 93, Chinese soldier and writer.
- Bernard Braine, 85, British politician.
- George Cawthray, 86, English cricketer.
- Goseki Kojima, 71, Japanese manga artist.
- Pete Morin, 84, Canadian ice hockey player (Montreal Canadiens).
- Kumar Ponnambalam, 61, Sri Lankan Tamil lawyer and politician, assassinated.
- Hopper Read, 89, English cricketer.
- Vic Schoen, 83, American bandleader, arranger and composer, pneumonia.
- K. L. Shrimali, 90, Indian politician and educationist.
- Tony Steponovich, 92, American football player (Minneapolis Red Jackets, Frankford Yellow Jackets).
- Bernhard Wicki, 80, Austrian actor and film director.
- Adam Yarmolinsky, 77, American academic, author and government official, leukemia.

=== 6 ===
- Celia, unknown, the Last known full blooded Pyrenean ibex, tree fall.
- Leonard F. Chapman, Jr., 86, United States Marine Corps general, cancer.
- Michael Rex Horne, 78, English structural engineer, scientist and academic.
- Byron L. Johnson, 82, American economist and politician.
- Thomas Jamison MacBride, 85, American jurist.
- Don Martin, 68, American cartoonist (MAD Magazine), cancer.
- Kjeld Østrøm, 66, Danish rower and Olympian (1956).
- Edward Pain, 74, Australian Olympic rower (1952).
- Sven-Pelle Pettersson, 88, Swedish Olympic swimmer and water polo player (1928, 1936).
- Malvina Polo, 96, American film actress.
- Horst Seemann, 62, German film director and screenwriter.
- Ajit Pratap Singh, 82, Indian politician.
- Robert McG. Thomas, Jr., 60, American journalist and obituarist, abdominal cancer.
- Clarence Tommerson, 84, American football player (Pittsburgh Pirates).
- Alexey Vyzmanavin, 40, Russian chess Grandmaster, heart attack.

=== 7 ===
- Zainal Abidin, 71, Indonesian actor.
- Gary Albright, 36, American professional wrestler, heart attack.
- Teddy Brenner, 81, American boxing matchmaker, Parkinson's disease.
- Robert B. Crosby, 88, American politician.
- Dorothy Damaschke, 82, American baseball player.
- Makhmud Esambayev, 75, Soviet and Russian actor and dancer, natural causes.
- Ken Keyworth, 65, English football player.
- Bob McFadden, 76, American voice actor, amyotrophic lateral sclerosis.
- Bernice Petkere, 98, American songwriter.
- Dorian Shainin, 85, American quality consultant, aeronautics engineer, and author.
- Rodica Simion, 44, Romanian-American mathematician.
- Klaus Wennemann, 59, German television and film actor, lung cancer.

=== 8 ===
- Karl Adamek, 89, Austrian football player and manager.
- Ephraim Akpata, 72, Nigerian lawyer.
- Rudy Cipolla, 99, Italian American mandolinist and composer.
- Bernard Cunniffe, 83, English rugby player.
- Dominick DeJoseph, 84, American politician.
- Bill Domm, 69, Canadian politician.
- Henry Eriksson, 79, Swedish middle-distance runner and Olympic champion (1948).
- Ray Huang, 81, Chinese historian and philosopher, heart attack.
- Ismael Ramzi, 82, Egyptian Olympic diver (1936, 1948).
- Hilary Smart, 74, American sailor and Olympic champion (1948), natural causes.
- Jack Stokes, 76, Canadian politician, lung cancer.
- Fritz Thiedemann, 81, German equestrian and Olympian (1952, 1956, 1960).
- Warren H. Wagner, 79, American botanist.

=== 9 ===
- Réal Bouvier, 54, Canadian navigator and a Quebec journalist.
- Marguerite Churchill, 89, American film actress, natural causes.
- Edward R. Cony, 76, American journalist and newspaper executive, pneumonia and complications from Alzheimer's.
- Seby Coutinho, 70, Indian actor.
- Burr Folks, 84, American Olympic canoeist (1936).
- Arnold Alexander Hall, 84, British aeronautical engineer, scientist and industrialist.
- Poul Mejer, 68, Danish football player and Olympian (1960).
- Nigel Tranter, 90, Scottish writer, influenza.
- Sir David Young, 73, British general.
- Bruno Zevi, 81, Italian architect, historian, curator and author.

=== 10 ===
- Arthur Batanides, 76, American actor (Police Academy, Rod Brown of the Rocket Rangers, Johnny Midnight).
- Jens Björklund, 89, Swedish Olympic weightlifter (1936).
- Wesley Drewett Black, 89, Canadian educator and politician, pneumonia.
- Jim Blevins, 65, American football player.
- Maxine Elliott Hicks, 95, American actress.
- Sam Jaffe, 98, American motion picture agent, producer, studio executive.
- Gibson Jalo, 60, Nigerian army general.
- Richard Jameson, 47, Northern Irish loyalist and paramilitary commander, shot.
- Cliff Lloyd, 83, Welsh football player.
- John Newland, 82, American director and actor, stroke.

=== 11 ===
- Raymond Ameijide, 75, American illustrator.
- Betty Archdale, 92, English-Australian sportswoman and educationalist.
- Phil Carrick, 47, English cricketer, leukemia.
- Helena Carter, 76, American actress.
- Barney Childs, 73, American composer and teacher, Parkinson's disease.
- Ivan Combe, 88, American inventor.
- Wilhelm Grewe, 88, German diplomat and professor of international law.
- Bob Lemon, 79, American baseball player and manager.
- Solomon Mamaloni, 56, Solomon Islands politician and Prime Minister, kidney disease.
- William Andrew McDonald, 86, American archaeologist.
- Ralph Purchase, 83, American competition rower and Olympic champion (1948).
- Gordon Wright, 87, American historian, complications from diabetes.
- Pavao Žanić, 81, Yugoslav prelate of the Catholic Church.

=== 12 ===
- Coventry Brown, 89, Scottish footballer and Olympian (1936).
- Peter Curtis, 66, Australian rules footballer.
- Marc Davis, 86, American animator (Cinderella, Sleeping Beauty, Bambi).
- Bob DeFruiter, 81, American football player (Washington Redskins, Detroit Lions, Los Angeles Rams).
- Dan Duchaine, 47, American bodybuilder, author, and convicted felon, polycystic kidney disease.
- Ivan Filin, 73, Soviet Russian marathon runner and Olympian (1956).
- Emmett Mortell, 83, American football player (Philadelphia Eagles).
- V. R. Nedunchezhiyan, 79, Indian politician, Chief Minister of Tamil Nadu, heart failure.
- Bobby Phills, 30, American basketball player (Cleveland Cavaliers, Charlotte Hornets), car accident.
- Margaret Hutchinson Rousseau, 89, American chemical engineer.
- Alex Wright, 69, Scottish football player and manager.

=== 13 ===
- Toivo Ahjopalo, 86, Finnish Olympic sprinter (1936).
- Yves Bonsang, 49, French Olympic bobsledder (1972).
- Phil Crowe, 89, Irish rugby player.
- Murray Davison, 61, Canadian ice hockey player (Boston Bruins).
- Eric Dodson, 79, British actor.
- Herbert S. Gutowsky, 80, American chemist.
- Peter Henderson, Baron Henderson of Brompton, 77, British public servant, Clerk of the Parliaments.
- Antti Hyvärinen, 67, Finnish ski jumper, coach and Olympic champion (1952, 1956).
- Elizabeth Kerr, 87, American actress (Mork & Mindy).
- Alvin Liberman, 82, American psychologist, complications during heart surgery.
- John Ljunggren, 80, Swedish race walker and Olympic champion (1948, 1952, 1956, 1960, 1964).
- Alfred Nzo, 74, South African political activist, stroke.
- Susumu Ohno, 71, Japanese-American geneticist and evolutionary biologist.
- Enric Valor i Vives, 88, Spanish writer and grammarian.

=== 14 ===
- Yoshinotani Akitoshi, 50, Japanese sumo wrestler, multiple organ failure.
- Meche Barba, 77, American-Mexican film actress and dancer, heart attack.
- Bud Barbee, 85, American baseball player.
- Alphonse Boudard, 74, French novelist and playwright.
- Pat Boyette, 76, American broadcaster and comic book artist (Peacemaker), esophagus cancer.
- Giusi Raspani Dandolo, 83, Italian stage, film, television and radio actress.
- Guadalupe Huerta, 79, American hispanic activist and lobbyist.
- Bijan Jalali, 72, Iranian poet and writer.
- Hans-Joachim Kahler, 91, German general during World War II.
- Alain Poiré, 82, French film producer, cancer.
- Clifford Truesdell, 80, American mathematician.
- M. V. Venkatram, 79, Indian writer from Tamil Nadu.
- Leonard Weisgard, 83, American children's writer and illustrator.
- Tomislav Zografski, 65, Macedonian composer.

=== 15 ===
- Beryl Clark, 82, American gridiron football player (Chicago Cardinals).
- Andrew Devane, 82, Irish architect.
- Gustav Jung, 54, German footballer.
- Marie Kazmierczak, 79, American baseball player.
- Jim LaMarque, 78, American baseball player.
- Georges-Henri Lévesque, 96, Canadian Dominican priest and sociologist.
- Yves Mariot, 51, French football player, aneurysm.
- Annie Palmen, 73, Dutch singer.
- Arkan, 47, Serbian mobster and paramilitary commander, shot.
- Alf Ringstead, 72, Irish football player.
- Fran Ryan, 83, American actress (Pale Rider, Days of Our Lives, The Wizard).

=== 16 ===
- Wolf Ackva, 88, German actor.
- James Card, 84, American film preservationist.
- Harry Cavan, 83, Irish football official.
- Adrian Deamer, 77, Australian journalist, newspaper editor and lawyer, cancer.
- Gene Harris, 66, American jazz pianist, kidney failure.
- Will "Dub" Jones, 71, American R&B singer, diabetes.
- T. N. Kaul, 87, Indian diplomat, cardiac arrest.
- Ladislao Odescalchi, 79, Italian Olympic sports shooter (1952).
- By Saam, 85, American sportscaster.
- Robert R. Wilson, 85, American physicist and team member of the Manhattan Project.

=== 17 ===
- Norman Blamey, 85, English painter.
- Marion Elizabeth (Walsh) de Chastelain, 89, American-born Canadian spy.
- Elisabeth Collins, 95, British painter and sculptor.
- Vasile Cristea, 93, Romanian Greek Catholic hierarch.
- Carl Forberg, 88, American racecar driver.
- Stephen Fuchs, 91, Austrian Catholic priest, missionary, and anthropologist.
- Andrej Hieng, 74, Slovene writer, playwright and theatre director.
- Philip Jones, 71, British trumpeter.
- Ralph Ambrose Kekwick, 91, British biochemist.
- Ion Rațiu, 82, Romanian diplomat, journalist, writer, and politician.
- Arthur Sager, 95, American track and field athlete and Olympian (1928).
- Hüseyin Velioğlu, 48, Kurdish Hezbollah leader, killed in a police shootout.

=== 18 ===
- Alfred Nash Beadleston, Jr., 87, American politician.
- Gordon Chalmers, 88, American swimmer, swimming coach, and Olympian (1932).
- Alton Cianchette, 69–70, American businessperson and politician, twice member of the Maine Senate, plane crash.
- Nancy Coleman, 87, American actress.
- Frances Drake, 87, American actress.
- Jester Hairston, 98, American actor and composer, natural causes.
- Francis Haskell, 71, English art historian, liver cancer.
- Raymond Brendan Manning, 65, American carcinologist.
- Gordon J. McCann, 92, Canadian thoroughbred horse trainer, pneumonia.
- Arthur Nash, 85, Canadian ice hockey player and Olympian (1936).
- Margarete Schütte-Lihotzky, 102, Austrian communist resistance member during World War II.

=== 19 ===
- Victor Brooks, 81, English film and television actor.
- M. A. Chidambaram, 81, Indian industrialist and cricket administrator.
- Luigi Chinazzo, 67, Italian Olympic wrestler (1956, 1960).
- Josh Clayton-Felt, 32, American singer-songwriter and multi-instrumentalist, choriocarcinoma.
- Bettino Craxi, 65, Italian politician, Prime Minister (1983-1987), diabetes.
- Édouard des Places, 99, French philologist.
- Billy Dewell, 83, American gridiron football player (Chicago Cardinals).
- Anselmo Fernandez, 81, Portuguese architect and football manager.
- Victoria Fromkin, 76, American linguist, colorectal cancer.
- Frederick Irving Herzberg, 76, American psychologist.
- Hedy Lamarr, 85, Austrian actress (Samson and Delilah, Algiers, White Cargo), cardiovascular disease.
- Manny Montejo, 64, Cuban baseball player (Detroit Tigers).
- Lynn Myers, 85, American baseball player (St. Louis Cardinals).
- Alan North, 79, American actor (Serpico, Highlander, Glory), lung and kidney cancer.
- Irra Petina, 91, Russian-American actress, singer, and contralto.
- Heinrich Schroeteler, 84, German sculptor and U-boat commander during World War II.
- George Ledyard Stebbins, 94, American botanist, cancer.
- Chhean Vam, 83, Cambodian politician and nationalist.
- Stanley Weston, 76, British Olympic basketball player (1948).
- Rex Willis, 75, Welsh rugby union player.

=== 20 ===
- Trini Alonso, 76, Spanish actress.
- Robert Christmas, 75, Canadian Olympic rower (1948).
- Chuck Courtney, 69, American actor and stuntman, suicide by gunshot.
- Han Dekker, 86, Dutch Olympic rower (1948).
- Enzo Diena, 76, Italian philatelist.
- Robert J. Henle, 90, American Catholic priest, jesuit, and philosopher.
- Ron Herbel, 62, American baseball player, heart attack.
- Slavko Janevski, 80, Macedonian poet, prose and script writer.
- Jacques Lavoie, 63, Canadian politician, member of the House of Commons of Canada (1975-1979).
- Don Samuelson, 86, American politician, Governor of Idaho, heart attack.
- Izabella Yurieva, 100, Soviet Russian romance singer.

=== 21 ===
- Kristian Asdahl, 79, Norwegian politician.
- D. Brook Bartlett, 62, American district judge (United States District Court for the Western District of Missouri), multiple myeloma.
- Pedro Antonio Blanco, 47, Spanish colonel, bombing.
- John A. Calhoun, 81, American diplomat, pneumonia and kidney failure.
- Dagmar Edqvist, 96, Swedish writer and screenwriter.
- Saeb Salam, 95, Lebanese politician and Prime Minister, heart attack.
- Bernard Unett, 63, British racing driver, cancer.

=== 22 ===
- Victor Cavallo, 52, Italian actor and underground writer, hepatitis C.
- Craig Claiborne, 79, American restaurant critic.
- Ed Clark, 88, American photographer.
- Carlo Cossutta, 67, Italian opera singer, liver cancer.
- Al Costello, 80, Italian-Australian professional wrestler, pneumonia and heart problems.
- Peter Gould, 67, American geographer and academic.
- Masao Harada, 87, Japanese athlete and Olympic silver medalist (1936).
- Anne Hébert, 83, French Canadian author and poet, bone cancer.
- Alan Pryce-Jones, 91, British book critic, writer, journalist and politician.
- Dai Suli, 80, Chinese politician.
- Ernest William Swanton, 92, British cricket commentator, heart failure.
- Balaupasakage Yasodis Tudawe, 84, Sri Lankan politician.

=== 23 ===
- Kay Cavendish, 89, British pianist and entertainer.
- Ecaterina Ciorănescu-Nenițescu, 90, Romanian chemist.
- Ellen Walker Craig-Jones, 93, American politician.
- Willie Hamilton, 82, British politician.
- George Hoskins, 71, New Zealand runner and Olympian (1952).
- Wilbur Lansing, 71, American baseball player.
- Nicholas Nagy-Talavera, 70, Hungarian-American dissident, historian and writer.
- Roderick O'Connor, 90, Northern Irish politician.
- William Alexander Sutton, 82, New Zealand painter.

=== 24 ===
- Jeffrey Boam, 53, American screenwriter (Indiana Jones and the Last Crusade, The Lost Boys, Lethal Weapon 2), heart failure from a rare lung disease.
- Theodor Brinek, Jr., 78, Austrian football player and Olympian (1948).
- Satish Chandra, 75, Indian judge.
- Carl Thomas Curtis, 94, American politician, member of the U.S. House of Representatives (1939-1954) and U.S. Senate (1955-1979).
- Bobby Duncum, Jr., 34, American professional wrestler, accidental overdose.
- Massimo Severo Giannini, 84, Italian lawyer and politician, heart attack.
- Gunnar Kroge, 69, Norwegian ice hockey player and Olympian (1952).
- Jean Lansiaux, 70, French Olympic boxer (1952).
- Tatyana Petrenko-Samusenko, 61, Soviet fencer and Olympic champion (1960, 1964, 1968, 1972).
- Reynolds Shultz, 78, American politician, Lieutenant Governor of Kansas.

=== 25 ===
- Dale Alford, 83, American ophthalmologist and politician, congestive heart failure.
- Mike Berticelli, 48, American college soccer coach.
- Hermia Boyd, 68, Australian artist.
- John Cadusch, 86, Australian rules footballer.
- Don Coulton, 78, Australian rules footballer.
- Bobby Cunliffe, 71, English footballer.
- Folke Ekström, 93, Swedish chess master.
- Herta Freitag, 91, Austrian-American mathematician.
- Lin Halliday, 63, American saxophonist.
- Aleksander Illi, 87, Estonian Olympic basketball player (1936).
- P. Lankesh, 64, Indian poet, writer, playwright and journalist, heart attack.
- Tom Pedigo, 59, American set decorator (Terms of Endearment, Star Trek III: The Search for Spock, Brainstorm).

=== 26 ===
- Don Budge, 84, American tennis player, traffic collision.
- Jack Danckert, 77, Australian rules footballer.
- John A. DeNovo, 83, American historian.
- Kathleen Hale, 101, British artist, illustrator, and children's author.
- Jean-Claude Izzo, 54, French poet, playwright, and novelist, cancer.
- Frankie Pack, 71, American baseball player (St. Louis Browns).
- Adolf Pilch, 85, Polish resistance fighter during World War II.
- Don Ralke, 79, American music arranger.
- Bill Strickland, 91, American baseball player (St. Louis Browns).
- Adib Taherzadeh, 78, Iranian Baháʼí author.
- A. E. van Vogt, 87, Canadian science fiction writer, pneumonia.

=== 27 ===
- Don Abney, 76, American jazz pianist, complications from kidney dialysis.
- Joseph Castaldo, 72, American composer.
- Roberto Dávila, 71, Chilean lawyer and judge.
- Mae Faggs, 67, American sprinter and Olympian (1948, 1952, 1956), cancer.
- Friedrich Gulda, 69, Austrian pianist, heart failure.
- Matateu, 72, Portuguese footballer.
- Setsuo Nara, 63, Japanese basketball player and Olympian (1956, 1960, 1964).
- Jerzy Potz, 46, Polish ice hockey player and Olympian (1972, 1976, 1980, 1988), carcinoma.
- Abner W. Sibal, 78, American politician, member of the U.S. House of Representatives (1961-1965).
- Bert Sproston, 85, English footballer.

=== 28 ===
- Robert B. Aird, 96, American educator.
- Beans Bowles, 73, American jazz and session musician, prostate cancer.
- Sarah Caudwell, 60, British detective story writer and barrister, throat cancer.
- Tony Doyle, 58, Irish television and film actor.
- George Eastham Sr., 86, English footballer.
- Lauris Edmond, 75, New Zealand poet and writer.
- Ron Feiereisel, 68, American basketball player (Minneapolis Lakers), and coach.
- Ted Gullic, 93, American baseball player (St. Louis Browns).
- Hugh Guthrie, 89, Australian politician.
- Ed Hirsch, 78, American gridiron football player (Buffalo Bills).
- El-Sayed Kandil, 82-83, Egyptian Olympic wrestler (1948).
- Bertel Lauring, 72, Danish film actor.
- Rómulo Parés, 74, Argentine Olympic boxer (1952).
- Gad Rausing, 77, Swedish industrialist.
- Enrique Rettberg, 81, Argentine Olympic fencer (1952).
- Joy Shelton, 77, English actress, pulmonary emphysema.
- Toni Siebenhaar, 76, German Olympic rower (1952).
- Kenneth Waller, 72, British actor.

=== 29 ===
- Ben Burns, 86, American print editor.
- Francesco Cergoli, 78-79, Italian football player and coach.
- Harold H. Greene, 76, American district judge (United States District Court for the District of Columbia), cerebral hemorrhage during brain surgery.
- George McTurnan Kahin, 82, American historian and political scientist.
- Herbert Schiller, 80, American media critic, sociologist, and author.
- Hannes Schmidhauser, 73, Swiss actor and football player.
- E. L. Senanayake, 79, Sri Lankan politician.
- Harry Thompson, 84, English football player and manager.

=== 30 ===
- Martin Aldridge, 25, English footballer, car crash.
- Russ Bixler, 72, American chief executive.
- Isidore Dollinger, 96, American politician, member of the U.S. House of Representatives (1949-1959).
- Sigvard Arne Eklund, 88, Swedish politician.
- Angelo Innocent Fernandes, 86, Indian Roman Catholic archbishop.
- Karl-Friedrich Höcker, 88, German war criminal and SS commander during World War II.
- Steve Little, 34, American boxer, colon cancer.
- Veneranda Nzambazamariya, 43, Rwandan peace activist, founding member of Pro-Femmes Twese Hamwe, plane crash.
- Joseph Rothschild, 68, American historian and political scientist.

=== 31 ===
- Martin Benrath, 73, German film actor, cancer.
- Georges Conan, 86, French cyclist and Olympian (1932).
- John R. Devitt, 82, American lawyer and politician.
- Ralph Fife, 80, American football player (Chicago Cardinals, Pittsburgh Steelers), and coach.
- Bendt Jørgensen, 75, Danish football player and manager.
- Gil Kane, 73, American comic book artist (Green Lantern, Spider-Man, Atom), lymphoma.
- Vasant Shankar Kanetkar, 79, Indian Marathi language playwright and novelist.
- Ralph Manza, 78, American actor (Get Shorty, The D.A.'s Man, Godzilla), heart attack.
- Ross Russell, 90, American jazz producer and writer.
- Jafar Salmasi, 81, Iranian weightlifter and Olympic medalist (1948).
- K. N. Singh, 91, Indian actor.
- Morris Thompson, 60, American businessman and politician (Bureau of Indian Affairs), plane crash.
- Leo VanderKuy, 70, American college basketball player (Michigan Wolverines).
- Arthur Wilson, 91, English footballer.
- Si Zentner, 82, American trombonist and jazz big-band leader, leukemia.
