= Philip Crowe =

Philip Crowe may refer to:

- Philip Crowe (rugby union), English-born Australian surgical oncologist, cricketer and rugby union international
- Philip K. Crowe, American journalist, author, intelligence officer and diplomat
- Phil Crowe (ice hockey), Canadian ice hockey winger
- Phil Crowe (rugby union), Irish international rugby union player
