= Clive Taylor =

British journalist

- Born: Clive Taylor; 1926 or 1927; London, England
- Died: 18 April 1977 (aged 50); Dorset, England
- Occupation: Journalist
- Known for: Sports journalism

Clive Taylor (1926/27 – 18 April 1977) was a British journalist who worked as the cricket correspondent of The Sun from 1964 to 1977.

A "slim, handsome man", Taylor was a useful club cricketer in his youth. He started his career in Reg Hayter's sports reporting agency and the Morning Advertiser. His work in the latter impressed Bernie Coleman, a member of the Test and County Cricket Board committee, who recommended him to The Sun. He was hired by Frank Nicklin, the sports editor of The Sun, in September 1964. Unusually for the newspaper, Taylor was given the freedom to write "as he pleased". The Sun billed him as "The Man The Players Read". Taylor continued at The Sun till his death.

Taylor died following an illness contracted while touring India with the England team in 1976-77. John Woodcock, the then cricket correspondent of The Times wrote on his death that Taylor "could have done any of our jobs, only better". John Arlott wrote in The Guardian that Taylor's "writing was as orderly as his thought, yet constantly enlivened" by interesting phrases. Perhaps the most famous of Taylor's phrases was about David Steele, bespectacled and grey-haired going out to face Dennis Lillee and Jeff Thomson in 1975, who he described as the "bank clerk who went to war".

Taylor was born in London but shortly after his marriage with Elsa, he moved to Bridport near Dorset. They had a daughter Lynn. The Clive Taylor Prize is given to a student in Oxford University for outstanding sport journalism.

== Notes ==
- The date of his death appears as 18 April in Wisden, 19 April in The Cricketer.
