= 240th Division =

240th Division may refer to:

- 240th Infantry Division (Wehrmacht), Germany
- 240th Fighter Aviation Division, Soviet Union
- 240th Rifle Division, Soviet Union

== See also ==
- List of military divisions by number
