= Creti =

Creti is a surname. Notable people with the surname include:

- Donato Creti (1671–1749), Italian painter
- Marcello Creti (1922–2000), Italian inventor, gem prospector, and reported healer
- Vasco Creti (1874–1945), Italian film actor

== See also ==
- Poboru
