= Australian cricket team in England in 1975 =

International cricket tour

- Date: 10 July 1975 – 3 September 1975
- Location: England
- Result: Australia won the 4-Test series 1–0
Teams
- England: Australia
Captains
- MH Denness (1st Test) AW Greig (2nd, 3rd, 4th Tests): IM Chappell
Most runs
- JH Edrich (428 @ 53.50) DS Steele (365 @ 60.83): IM Chappell (429 @ 71.50); RB McCosker (414 @ 82.80)
Most wickets
- JA Snow (11 @ 32.27) AW Greig (8 @ 40.25): DK Lillee (21 @ 21.90); JR Thomson (16 @ 28.56)

Following the 1975 Cricket World Cup, the Australian cricket team remained in England in the 1975 season to play a four-match Test series against England.

For England, the principal resistance came from veteran opening batsman John Edrich and David Steele, who received a maiden international cap after a decade of county cricket for Northants and whose silver-haired, bespectacled appearance led the press to dub him "the bank clerk who went to war". Steele went on to be named the BBC Sports Personality of the Year 1975, the first cricketer to win the accolade since Jim Laker in 1956. Nonetheless, in the absence of Geoffrey Boycott, the batting was again broadly unable to withstand the pace-bowling partnership of Dennis Lillee and Jeff Thomson, with swing bowler Max Walker providing admirable support; the trio shared 51 wickets in the four Tests. The tour was Ian Chappell's last as captain; he met with considerable success with the bat, compiling Australia's highest aggregate, but announced his retirement from the captaincy following the final Test.

Australia won the series 1–0 with three matches drawn. Australia therefore retained The Ashes.

== Series summary ==
=== First Test ===
10–14 July 1975
scorecard
report

Australia	v	England
359 (121 overs); RW Marsh 61; JA Snow 3/86, GG Arnold 3/91		101 (45.3 overs); JH Edrich 34; DK Lillee 5/15, MHN Walker 5/48
		173 (f/o) (75.2 overs); KWR Fletcher 51; JR Thomson 5/38

Australia won by an innings and 85 runs
Edgbaston
Umpires: HD Bird (ENG) and AE Fagg (ENG)

In overcast conditions, England captain Mike Denness asked Australia to bat; Rick McCosker (59) and debutant Alan Turner (37) added 80 for the first wicket, and further contributions from Ian Chappell (52), Ross Edwards (56), Rod Marsh (61) and Jeff Thomson (49) enabled Australia to total 359. Shortly after the commencement of England's reply, a thunderstorm produced treacherous batting conditions; devastating spells from Dennis Lillee and Max Walker reduced England to 83/7 at the end of the second day and 101 all out the following morning, John Edrich (34) providing the only resistance. The pace of Jeff Thomson accounted for England's second innings demise, bowled out for 173 to hand Australia an innings victory, Keith Fletcher (51) top-scoring for England. Graham Gooch, on Test debut, scored a pair. England captain Denness scored 3 and 8, and was dropped from the side before the second Test, to be replaced as captain by Tony Greig.

=== Second Test ===
31 July – 5 August 1975
scorecard
report

England	v	Australia
315 (87.4 overs); AW Greig 96; DK Lillee 4/84		268 (77.4 overs); R Edwards 99, DK Lillee 73*; JA Snow 4/66
436/7 dec (147.4 overs); JH Edrich 175; AA Mallett 3/127		329/3 (147.4 overs); IM Chappell 86; AW Greig 2/82

Match drawn
Lord's
Umpires: WE Alley (ENG) and TW Spencer (ENG)

Dennis Lillee's four-wicket opening spell reduced England to 49/4 before David Steele (50), on debut, bailed England out. Steele set a platform for more positive contributions from new England captain Tony Greig (96) and Alan Knott (69), with Bob Woolmer (33), also on debut, shoring up the tail. In reply, John Snow reduced Australia to 37/3 and 81/7, but Ross Edwards (99) was well supported by the tail, especially Lillee (73 not out, with three sixes). John Edrich (175) anchored England's second innings, sharing partnerships of 111 for the first wicket with Barry Wood (52), 104 for the second with Steele (45), 66 for the fourth with Graham Gooch (31). Sedate at first, Edrich hit out as a declaration neared, adding 65 for the fifth with Greig (41 from 42 balls), before a hard-hitting cameo from Woolmer (31 from 25 balls, with two sixes) heralded Greig's declaration. Thanks to Rick McCosker (79), Ian Chappell (86), Greg Chappell (73 not out) and Edwards (52 not out), Australia did not struggle to salvage a draw, losing only three wickets in one-and-a-half days.

=== Third Test ===
14–19 August 1975
scorecard
report

England	v	Australia
288 (101.2 overs); DS Steele 73; GJ Gilmour 6/85		135 (76.5 overs); IM Chappell 35; PH Edmonds 5/28
291 (94 overs); DS Steele 92; AA Mallett 3/50, GJ Gilmour 3/72		220/3 (73 overs); RB McCosker 95*; DL Underwood 1/40

Match drawn
Headingley
Umpires: DJ Constant (ENG) and AE Fagg (ENG)

John Edrich (62) and David Steele (73) added 112 for England's second wicket, and Tony Greig contributed 51, but following Greig's run-out, England's last five wickets fell for 20 runs, the last four all to Gary Gilmour, as England were bowled out for 288. In reply, left-arm spinner Phil Edmonds, on debut, claimed 5/28 as Australia collapsed to 135 all out. With typical stoicism, Steele (92) anchored England's second innings. Chasing a target of 445, contributions from Rick McCosker (95 not out) and Ian Chappell (62) led Australia to 220/3 at the close of the fourth day; with the match thus poised and McCosker set to make a maiden Test century, overnight pitch vandalism (carried out by supporters alleging the wrongful conviction of George Davis) ensured that no play was possible on the final day. A potentially exciting finish was ruined although heavy rain fell in the afternoon meaning the match would likely have ended in a draw anyway.

=== Fourth Test ===
28 August – 3 September 1975
scorecard
report

Australia	v	England
532/9 dec (181 overs); IM Chappell 192, RB McCosker 127; CM Old 3/74, AW Greig 3/107		191 (69.1 overs); DS Steele 39; JR Thomson 4/50, MHN Walker 4/63
40/2 (17.1 overs); RB McCosker 25*; DL Underwood 1/5, AW Greig 1/9		538 (f/o) (233.5 overs); RA Woolmer 149; KD Walters 4/34, DK Lillee 4/91

Match drawn
The Oval
Umpires: HD Bird (ENG) and TW Spencer (ENG)

Rick McCosker (127, his maiden Test century) and Ian Chappell (192) took Australia to 280/1 at the end of the first day, setting up a total of 532/9. In reply, Barry Wood (30), John Edrich (12 from 98 balls) and David Steele (39 from 106 balls) painstakingly defied the Australians as England reached 78/1, but following the dismissals of Wood and Edrich, Jeff Thomson and Max Walker combined to reduce England to 147/8; only the tail-end efforts of Chris Old (25 not out) and John Snow (30) enabled England to reach an eventual total of 191 all out. Chappell asked England to follow on; with two-and-a-half days of a six-day Test remaining, defeat seemed almost inevitable. Still further resistance from Edrich (96) and Steele (66) saw England close the fourth day on 179/1; after Lillee dismissed both in quick succession the following morning, England continued to resist. Bob Woolmer (149, his maiden Test century) defied Australia for more than eight hours, sharing partnerships of 122 with Graham Roope (77) and 151 with Alan Knott (64) as England held out for 14 hours to reach 522/5. Only a spell of medium pace from Doug Walters eventually conquered England's lower order. In the limited remaining time, Australia reached 40/2. Chappell announced his retirement from the captaincy at the end of the match.

== Annual reviews ==
- Playfair Cricket Annual 1976
- Wisden Cricketers' Almanack 1976
