= Mica, Mureș =

Mica Mikefalva
- Commune
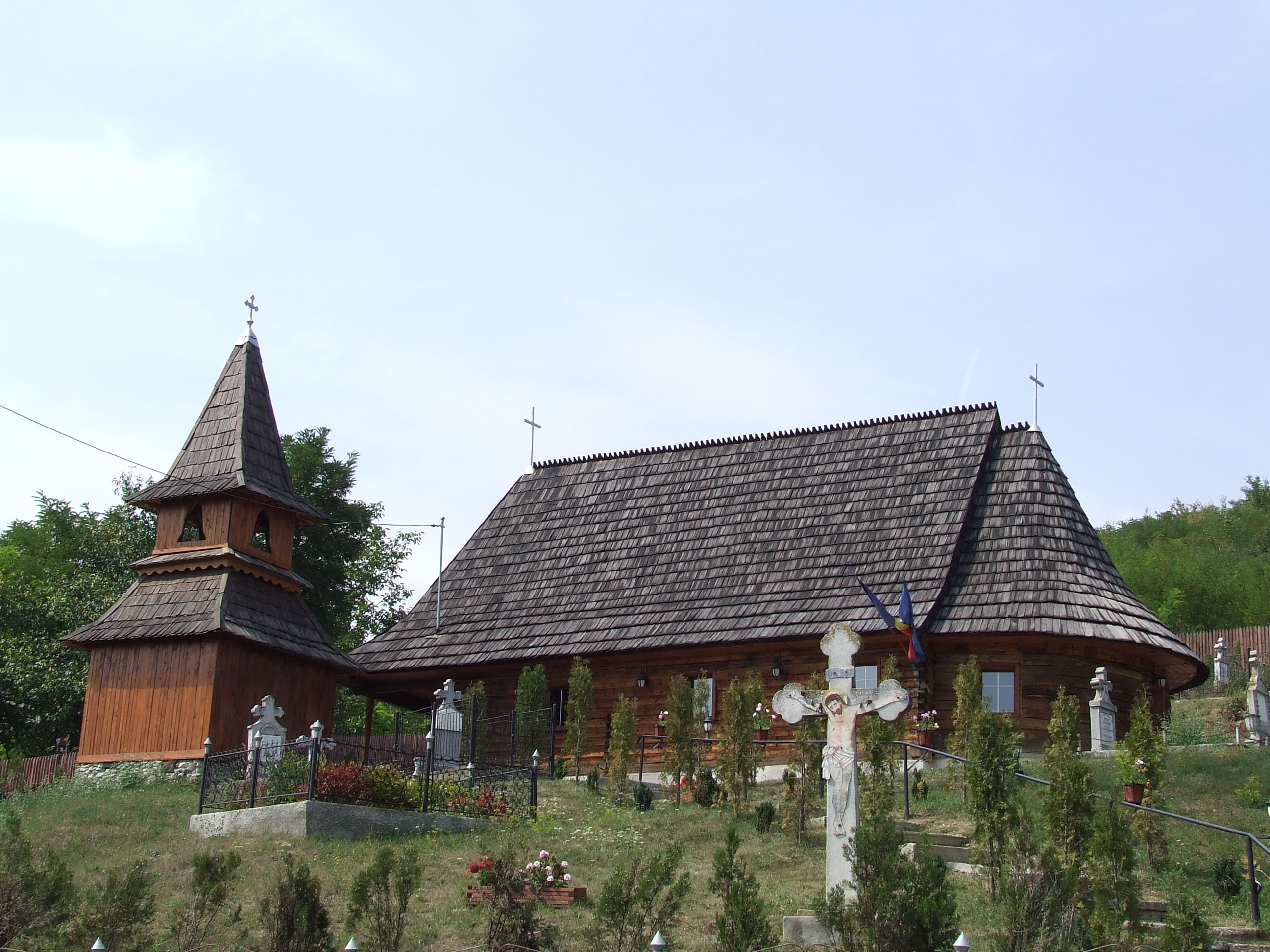
- Wooden church in Abuș

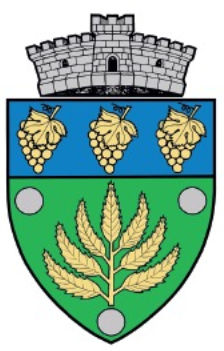
- Coat of arms

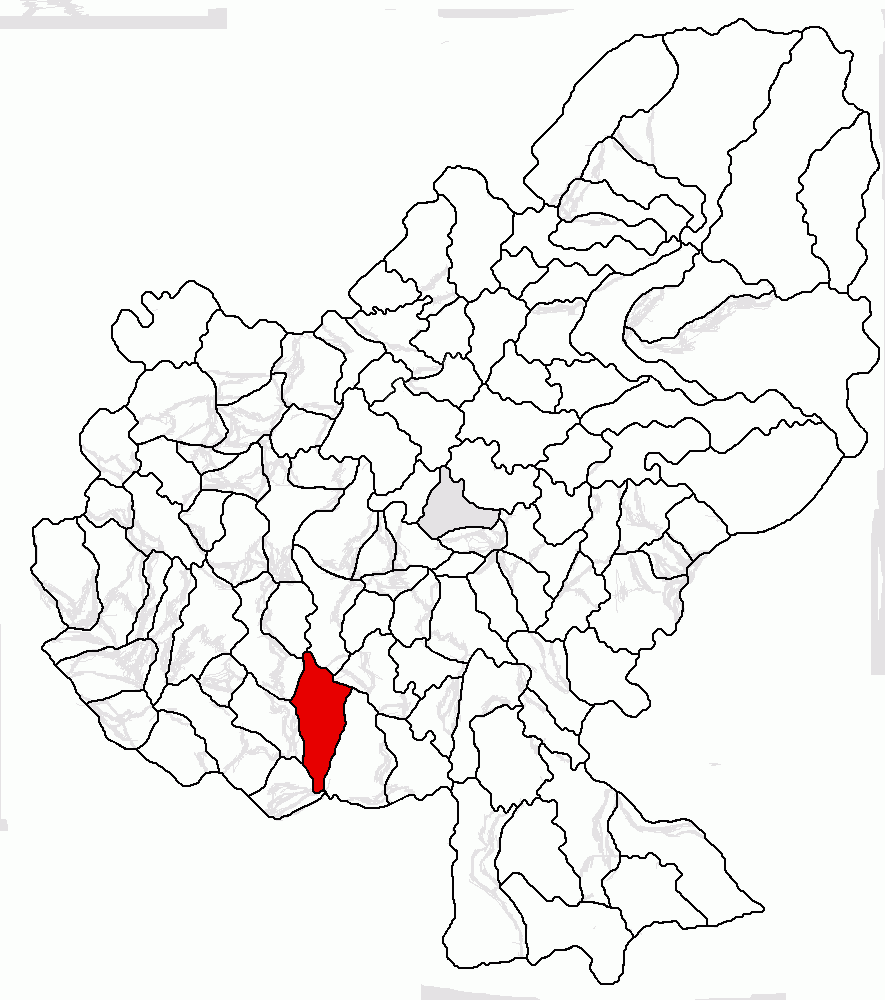
- Location in Mureș County

- Location in Romania
- Coordinates: 46°21′N 24°23′E
- Country: Romania
- County: Mureș

Government
  - Mayor (2024–2028): János Beres (UDMR)
- Area: 63.9 km^{2} (24.7 sq mi)
- Elevation: 308 m (1,010 ft)
- Population (2021-12-01): 4,821
  - Density: 75.4/km^{2} (195/sq mi)
- Time zone: UTC+02:00 (EET)
  - Summer (DST): UTC+03:00 (EEST)
- Postal code: 547400
- Area code: (+40) 0265
- Vehicle reg.: MS
- Website: primaria-mica.ro

Mica (Hungarian: Mikefalva, Hungarian pronunciation: [ˈmikɛfɒlvɒ]; German: Nickelsdorf) is a commune in Mureș County, Transylvania, Romania. It is composed of seven villages: Abuș (Abosfalva; Abtsdorf), Căpâlna de Sus (Felsőkápolna), Ceuaș (Szászcsávás), Deaj (Désfalva), Hărănglab (Harangláb), Mica, and Șomoștelnic (Somostelke).

== History ==
The locality formed part of the Székely Land region of the historical Transylvania province. Until 1918, it belonged to the Maros-Torda County of the Kingdom of Hungary. In the aftermath of World War I, the Union of Transylvania with Romania was declared in December 1918. At the start of the Hungarian–Romanian War of 1918–1919, the locality passed under Romanian administration; it officially became part of the territory ceded to the Kingdom of Romania in June 1920 under the terms of the Treaty of Trianon.

== Demographics ==
At the 2021 census, the commune had a population of 4,821; of those, 44.16% were Hungarians, 35.45% Roma, and 17.09% Romanians.

== Natives ==
- Vasile Cristea (1906 – 2000), Greek Catholic hierarch

== Villages ==
=== Abuș ===
Abuș is situated 9 km (5.6 mi) away from Târnăveni, on the county road DJ 142, and on the Blaj-Târnăveni-Praid railway. It was first attested in a document in 1361 with the name Obusfaolua (Abosfalva). In 1910 it had 460 people, and according to the 1992 census it had 358 inhabitants.

== See also ==
- List of Hungarian exonyms (Mureș County)
