= George Cawthray =

English cricketer

George Cawthray (28 September 1913 – 5 January 2000) was an English first-class cricketer, who played four matches for Yorkshire in a first-class career which spanned thirteen years. He appeared against Warwickshire and Essex in 1939, then reappeared against Glamorgan and Derbyshire in 1952.

Born in Selby, Yorkshire, England, Cawthray was a right-handed batsman, who scored 114 first-class runs at an average of 19.00, with a best of 30 against Glamorgan. He took four wickets with his right arm medium pace at 76.00 each, three of these coming in his last match against Derbyshire. He played for the Yorkshire Second XI in 1938 and 1939.

He played for Brayton School from 1924 to 1927, once taking five wickets in five balls, and represented Selby Schools in the Yorkshire Shield. He played for Brayton village side from 1928, along with Cawood and Selby Londesborough, before joining Hull Cricket Club where, from 1938 to 1959, he scored 8,384 runs at 29.30, and took 872 wickets at 12.91. In 1946, he was appointed groundsman/professional at Hull C.C., and took a similar post at Headingley in 1964. He was stated to have scored 30,000 runs, and taken 3,000 wickets during a long successful career which was interrupted by World War II, during which he was a glider pilot.

Early on 19 August 1975, Cawthray discovered that campaigners calling for the release from prison of George Davis, had dug holes in the pitch and poured oil over one end of the wicket. This led to the match between England and Australia being abandoned. The match was declared a draw, denying England of the chance to win back the Ashes.

He retired as groundsman at Headingley in 1978, aged 65, and died in January 2001, at the age of 87.
