= David Steele (cricketer) =

English cricketer

Personal information
- Full name: David Stanley Steele
- Born: 29 September 1941 (age 85); Bradeley, Stoke-on-Trent, England
- Nickname: Crime
- Batting: Right-handed
- Bowling: Slow left-arm orthodox

International information
- National side: England
- Test debut (cap 462): 31 July 1975 v Australia
- Last Test: 17 August 1976 v West Indies
- Only ODI (cap 36): 26 August 1976 v West Indies

Domestic team information
- Years: Team
- 1963–1978: Northamptonshire
- 1979–1981: Derbyshire
- 1982–1984: Northamptonshire

Career statistics
Competition	Test	ODI	FC	LA
Matches	8	1	500	260
Runs scored	673	8	22,346	4,381
Batting average	42.06	8.00	32.47	23.05
100s/50s	1/5	0/0	30/117	1/20
Top score	106	8	140*	109
Balls bowled	88	6	36,693	3,323
Wickets	2	0	623	81
Bowling average	19.50	–	24.89	28.27
5 wickets in innings	0	–	26	0
10 wickets in match	0	–	3	0
Best bowling	1/1	–	8/29	4/21
Catches/stumpings	7/–	0/–	546/–	91/–
- Source: ESPNcricinfo, 19 July 2013

David Stanley Steele (born 29 September 1941) is an English former international cricketer. Tony Greig picked him for England in 1975 when he was close to retirement from county cricket for Northamptonshire.

Steele, who was born in Bradeley, Stoke-on-Trent, was a middle-order batsman. In his eight Test matches, he played against fast bowlers including Dennis Lillee and Jeff Thomson for Australia; and Andy Roberts, Michael Holding, Wayne Daniel and Vanburn Holder for the West Indies. His arrival followed a period of great difficulty for the national team mired in a difficult 1975 Ashes series. It led to the phrase, coined by Clive Taylor of The Sun, that he was like a "bank clerk who went to war".

He was appointed as county captain of Derbyshire in 1979 but resigned after six weeks. He played for the club from 1979 to 1981.

== Life and career ==
Making his debut against Australia at Lord's in 1975, Steele got lost in the pavilion as he went out to bat. He went down one too many flights of stairs and found himself in the basement toilets. Once he did arrive at the crease, fast bowler Jeff Thomson gave him a typically Australian welcome. Eyeing Steele's prematurely greying hair at 33, Thomson asked: "Bloody hell, who've we got here, Groucho Marx?"

That summer, however, Steele scored 50, 45, 73, 92, 39 and 66 against the Australians in his trademark staunch, courageous and steady manner. When presenting Steele his cap in the dressing room before his debut, captain Tony Greig felt tears fall on his hand and considered that "Here was a man who would fight for me to the death". His ability to stand up to hostile fast bowling, which other batsmen had struggled to cope with, and attack with the hook shot, raised morale among his teammates and spectators alike.

In the following year, he commenced against the even more fearsome fast bowling attack of the West Indies by scoring a century at Trent Bridge. Oddly, he was overlooked for that winter's tour to India based on the theory that he could not play spin bowlers. He duly returned to county cricket and finished his career back at Northampton in 1984 having scored over 22,000 runs, of which 673 came in Tests.

Steele was voted BBC Sports Personality of the Year in 1975, and was named as one of the Wisden Cricketers of the Year in 1976.

Sporting positions
Preceded by Eddie Barlow	Derbyshire cricket captain 1979	Succeeded by Geoff Miller

Preceded by Brendan Foster	BBC Sports Personality of the Year; 1975	Succeeded by John Curry
