= Édouard des Places =

20th and 21st-century French philologist

- Born: 24 July 1900; Le Coudray, France
- Died: 19 January 2000 (aged 99); Paris, France
- Awards: Legion of Honour

Academic background
- Education: University of Montpellier University of Paris
- Thesis: [ Études sur quelques particules de liaison chez Platon] (1929)
- Doctoral advisor: Paul Mazon

Édouard des Places SJ (born 24 July 1900 in Le Coudray near Vineuil, Indre; died 19 January 2000 in Paris) was a French classical philologist.

== Life ==
Édouard des Places, the only son of a cavalry officer, initially received private lessons and then attended the Jesuit school in Montpellier, the Notre Dame de Mongré High School in Villefranche-sur-Saône and the Jesuit school in Sainte-Foy-lès-Lyon. After graduating from school, he decided to work as a teacher in Jesuit schools himself. In the First World War he did not take part as a soldier, but he taught rhetoric at the Jesuit school in Beirut as part of military service. After a visit to the Holy Land (1921) he was sent to the island of Jersey. From 1924 he taught Ancient Greek at the Jesuit school in Yzeure and at the same time prepared his doctorate at the Sorbonne in Paris. On 6 June 1929 he received his doctorate with a dissertation on grammatical particles in Plato supervised by Paul Mazon.

When the Second World War broke out, des Places was in Germany and volunteered as a chaplain to the 240th Infantry Regiment. In May and June 1940 he was praised for his work. At the Battle of Dunkirk he was taken prisoner by the Germans and taken together with other French soldiers and officers to the internment camp in Klomino near Gdańsk. While in captivity, Des Places held lectures with Paul Ricœur and others for the French prisoners of war.

After his repatriation in January 1941, des Places taught first in Mongré, and from 1944 again in Yzeure. In 1945 he worked for a short time as a chaplain in French-occupied Germany. From 1946 he held representative positions at the Institut Catholique de Paris and at the Institut des Hautes Études Scientifiques. In 1948 he got a permanent job at the Pontifical Biblical Institute in Rome, where he was library director until his retirement (1966). In addition to this activity, he also held lectures at the institute until 1982. In 1995, at the age of 95, he moved to Paris, where he died on 19 January 2000, at age 99.

== Works ==
- Études sur quelques particules de liaison chez Platon (1929)
- Une formule platonicienne de récurrence (1929)
- Oeuvres spirituelles de Diadoque de Photicé (1943-1955)
- Pindare et Platon (1949)
- Lois de Platon (1951)
- Épinomis (1956)
- Syngeneia. La parenté de l’homme avec Dieu, d’Homère à la patristique (1964)
- Les mystères de l’Égypte (1966)
- La religion grecque. Dieux, cultes, rites et sentiment religieux dans la Grèce antique (1969)
- Oracles chaldaïques (1971)
- Fragments de Numénius (1973)
- La Préparation évangélique d’Eusèbe de Césarée (1974-1991)
- Fragments d Atticus (1977)
- Eusèbe de Césarée commentateur. Platonisme et Écriture Sainte (1982)
- Protreptique (1989)
- Études platoniciennes, publié (1981)
- Chronique de la philosophie religieuse des Grec (1990)
