= Headingley Cricket Ground =

Cricket ground in Leeds, England

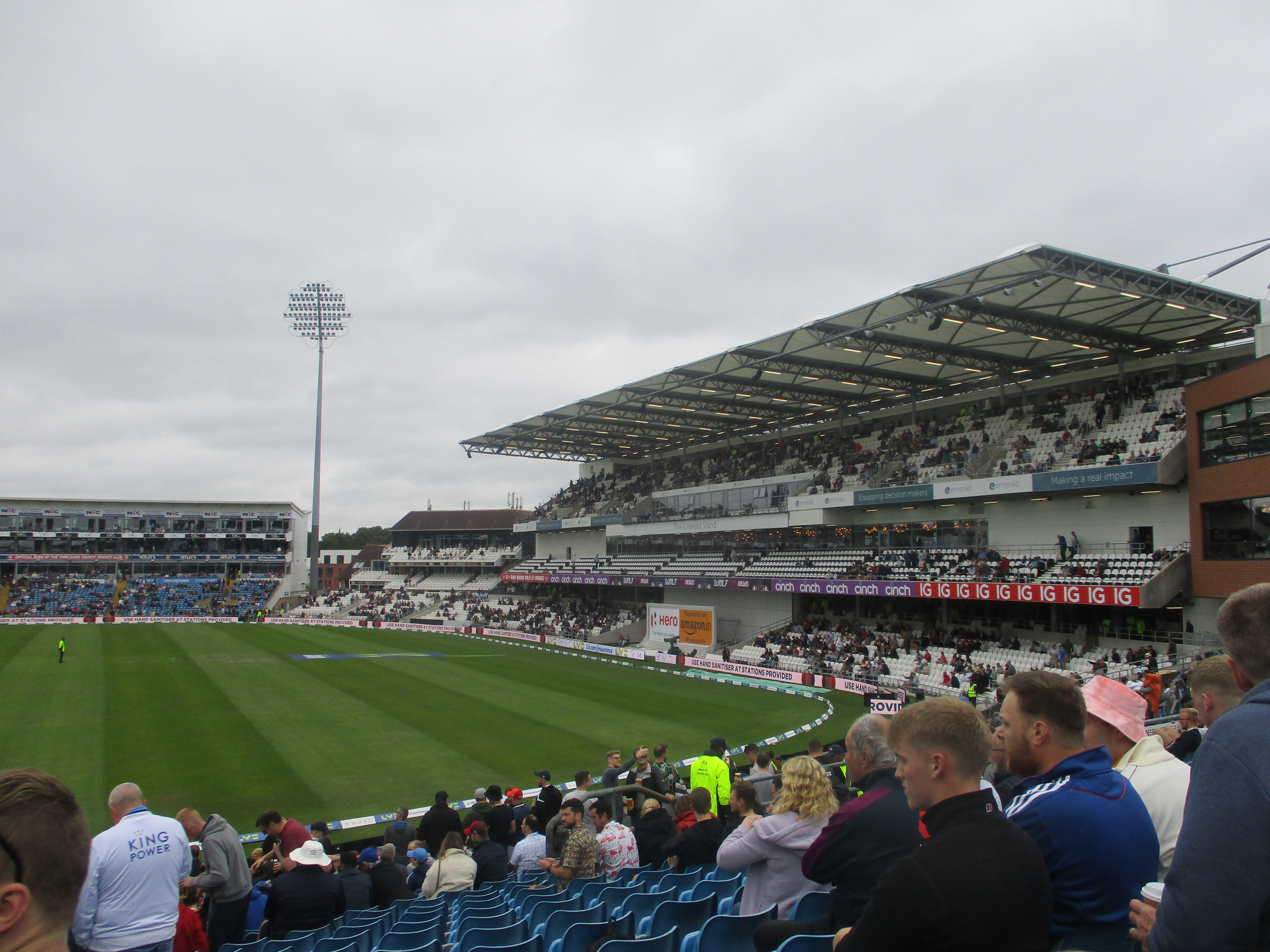
- Interactive map of Headingley Cricket Ground

Ground information
- Location: St. Michael's Lane, Headingley, Leeds
- Country: England
- Coordinates: 53°49′3.58″N 1°34′55.12″W
- Establishment: 1890
- Capacity: 18,350
- Owner: Yorkshire County Cricket Club
- End names
- Kirkstall Lane End Football Stand End

International information
- First men's Test: 29 June – 1 July 1899: England v Australia
- Last men's Test: 19–21 August 2026: England v Pakistan
- First men's ODI: 5 September 1973: England v West Indies
- Last men's ODI: 2 September 2025: England v South Africa
- Only men's T20I: 18 July 2021: England v Pakistan
- First women's Test: 12–16 June 1954: England v New Zealand
- Last women's Test: 6–10 July 2001: England v Australia
- Only women's ODI: 7 July 2018: England v New Zealand
- First women's T20I: 19 May 2024: England v Pakistan
- Last women's T20I: 23 June 2026: Australia v Pakistan

Team information
| Yorkshire | (1891–present) |
| Sunrisers Leeds | (2019–present) |
- As of 21 September 2024; Source: ESPNcricinfo

Headingley Cricket Ground is a cricket ground in the Headingley Stadium complex in Headingley, Leeds, England. It adjoins the Headingley Rugby Stadium through a shared main stand, although the main entrance to the cricket ground is at the opposite Kirkstall Lane end. It has hosted Test cricket since 1899 and has a capacity of 18,350.

== History ==
A sports ground at Headingley was developed by a group of benefactors led by Lord Hawke who was instrumental in the establishment of Yorkshire County Cricket Club; initially the ground was intended to be used for six sports; cricket, rugby, football, tennis, bowls and cycling. The first recorded first class cricket match took place at Headingley in September 1890. Prior to 1890 Yorkshire played matches around the county with the initial headquarters being at Bramall Lane in Sheffield. Yorkshire continued to use Bramall Lane as a secondary ground until 1973. In 1903 Yorkshire moved their base to Headingley. The mainstand shared between cricket and rugby was destroyed by fire in 1932; this was promptly replaced by a structure which stood until being demolished in 2018. In 2005 the ground was acquired by Yorkshire County Cricket Club from Leeds Cricket, Football and Athletic Company, the company established by Lord Hawke when the ground was first established. The first redevelopment of the ground undertaken under ownership of Yorkshire County Cricket Club was the development of the Carnegie Pavilion which was completed in 2010.

== Notable sporting moments ==
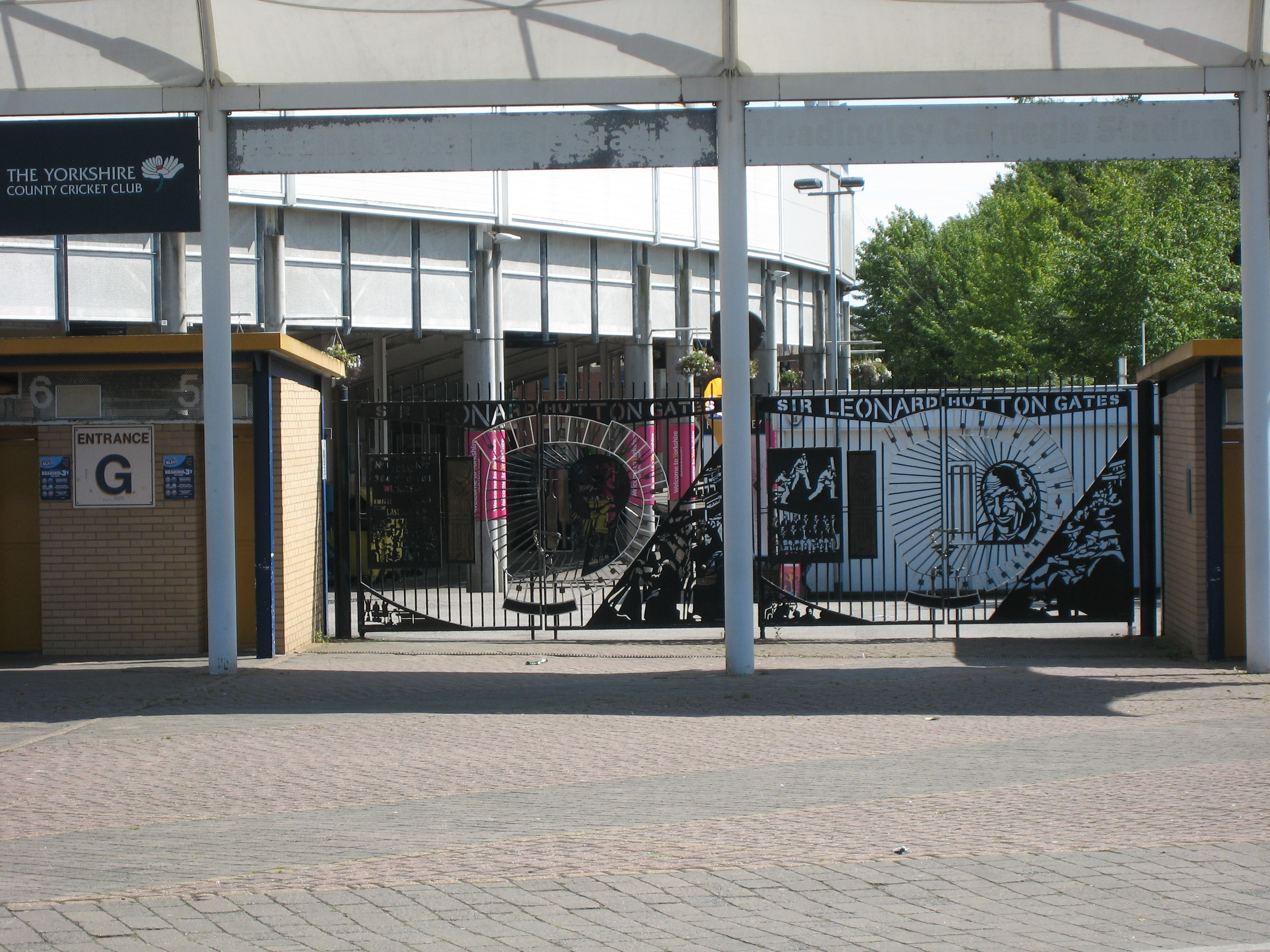
The Leonard Hutton Gates at the Headingley Stadium

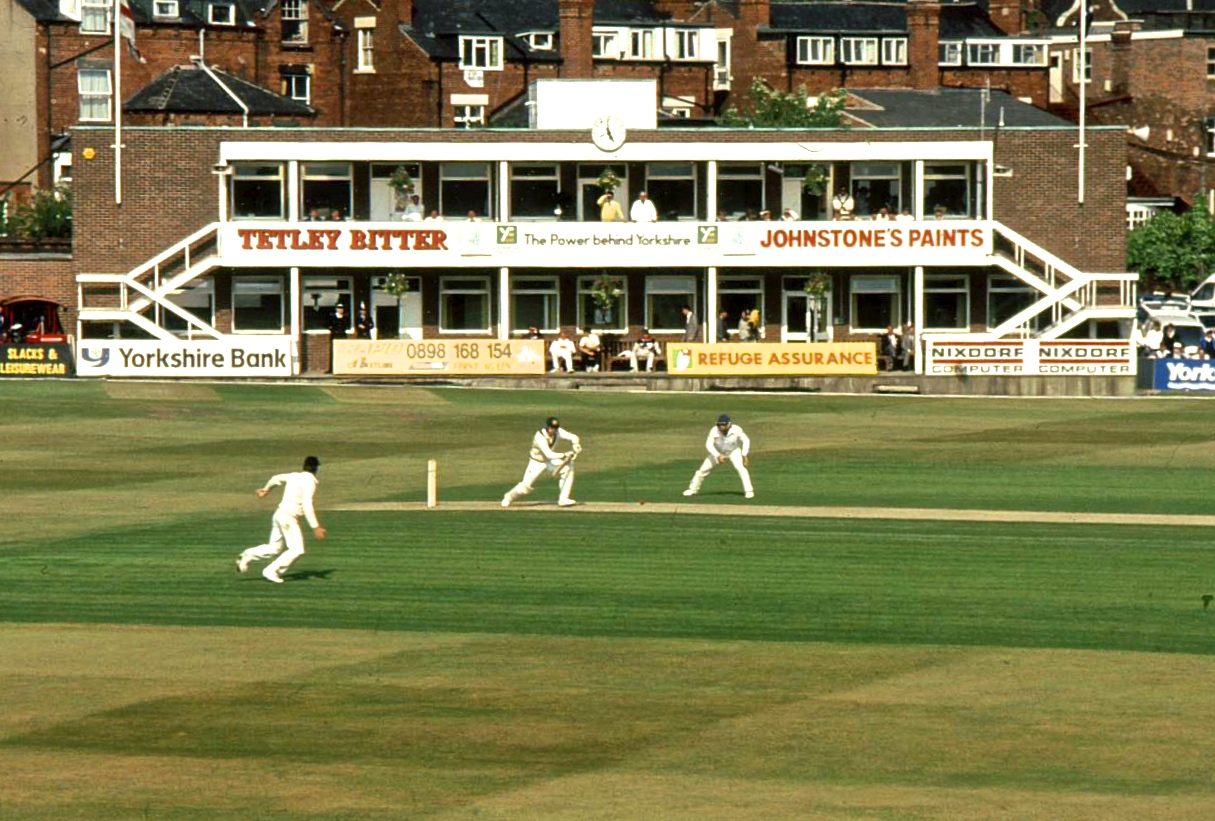
The Players Pavilion (now demolished) in 1983

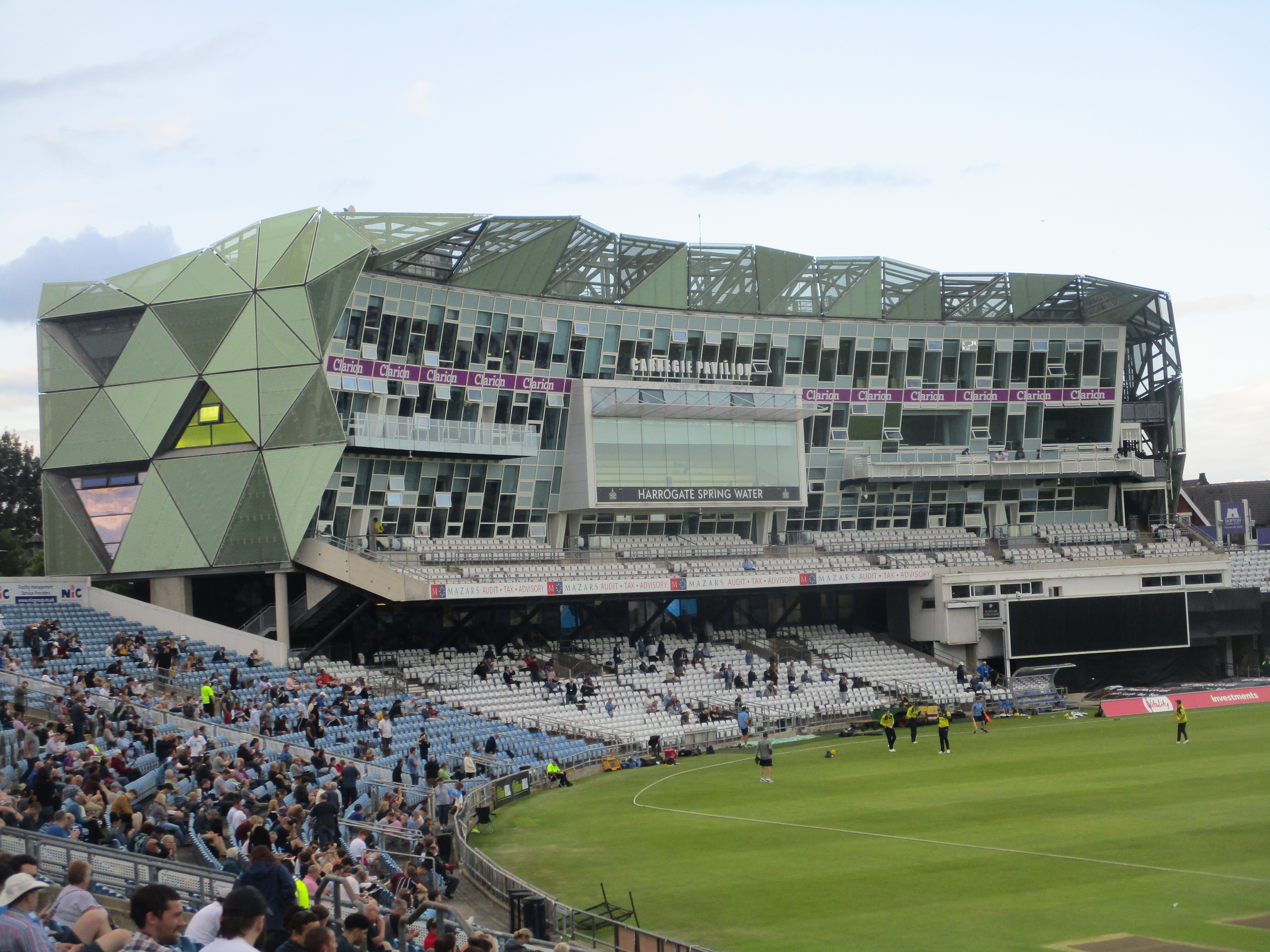
The Carnegie Pavilion in 2021

In 1902, Yorkshire beat the touring Australians by five wickets, after dismissing them for 23 in their second innings with George Herbert Hirst and Stanley Jackson taking five wickets each.

Donald Bradman's innings of 334 in the 1930 Ashes Test included 309 runs on the first day, and he followed it in the Australians' next test at Headingley in 1934 with an innings of 304.

Spinner Hedley Verity took 10 wickets for 10 runs in 1932 for Yorkshire v. Nottinghamshire, still the best bowling analysis ever in first-class cricket. Verity had also taken all ten against Warwickshire at Headingley in 1931.

In the Fourth Test of the 1948 Ashes series, Australia scored 404 for three on the last day to beat England. Arthur Morris scored 182 and Bradman scored 173 not out.

In the Third Test against New Zealand in 1965 John Edrich hit 53 fours and 5 sixes in his 310 not out. Captain M. J. K. Smith declared before Edrich had a chance to pass Gary Sobers' Test record 365 not out, and England won by an innings and 187 runs.

In the third test match of the 1975 Ashes series (a four-Test series), early on Tuesday 19 August head groundsman George Cawthray discovered that campaigners calling for the release from prison of George Davis had dug holes in the pitch and poured oil over one end of the wicket. This led to the match being abandoned and declared a draw, denying England the chance to win back the Ashes.

In the 1977 Ashes test, Geoff Boycott scored his hundredth first-class hundred. Four days later, by winning the same game, England won the series and regained the Ashes.

In the third Test of the 1981 Ashes England were forced to follow on. However Ian Botham scored 149 not out, and then Bob Willis took eight wickets for 43, to give England an eventual 18-run victory. Two members of the Australian team had taken the 500–1 odds. This was only the second time in the entire history of Test cricket that a side had followed-on and won; something which would not occur again until 2001.

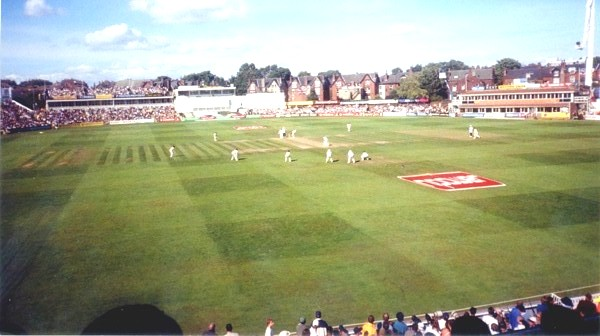
Headingley during 2001 Test series

In the Test of 1991, Graham Gooch scored a match-winning 154 not out, carrying his bat throughout England's second innings of 252, against the West Indies including Malcolm Marshall, Curtly Ambrose and Courtney Walsh.

In a game they had to win to stay in the 1999 ICC Cricket World Cup, the eventual cup-winners Australia chased down South Africa's 271 for seven after being 48 for three. Steve Waugh, who had been dropped by Herschelle Gibbs as he attempted to throw the ball up in celebration, scored 120 not out.

In 2000, England dismissed the West Indies for 61 to win in two days, with Andy Caddick taking four wickets in an over. England won again seven years later in 2007, as Ryan Sidebottom took eight wickets for 86 in two innings as England subjected the Windies to their worst Test defeat ever, an innings and 283 runs.

In August 2001, England successfully chased 315 to beat Australia, with Mark Butcher scoring an unbeaten 173 as England won by six wickets. However, in August 2009 in the 4th test of The Ashes series, Australia beat England in 2 1/2 days by an innings and 80 runs. Australia took twenty wickets with an attack without a spin bowler. England's middle order batsmen (Ravi Bopara, Ian Bell and Paul Collingwood) scored 16 runs between them in two innings. However, these were rogue results, with the 2009 series being won by England and the 2001 series won by Australia.

Sachin Tendulkar, Sourav Ganguly, Rahul Dravid slammed centuries when India played England at Headingley from 22 to 26 August 2002. A venue where England used to bank on for home comforts showcased Team India's convincing win as the then visitors thrashed the Three Lions to clinch the 3rd Test of the four-match series.

While Tendulkar top-scored for India with his majestic 193 off 330 balls, Ganguly played an entertaining knock of 128 off 167 balls. Ganguly and Tendulkar added 249 runs for the 4th wicket to help India register its highest total against England in 2002. In reply, Nasser Hussain's team folded for 273 in their 1st innings and India opted to impose a follow-on.

Skipper Hussain then lifted England with his 110 off 194 in the 2nd innings. However, Hussain's century went in vain as England only mustered 309 in their 2nd innings. India recorded one of the biggest wins over England by winning the 3rd Test by an innings and 46 runs.

On 17 August 2017, Yorkshire Vikings posted the highest ever T20 score in English domestic cricket of 260–4, with Adam Lyth scoring the highest individual score (161) in English T20 domestic cricket.

Twelve days later, Shai Hope scored two centuries in the test match between England and the West Indies, making him the first batsman in first-class cricket at Headingley to score a century in both innings of a match.

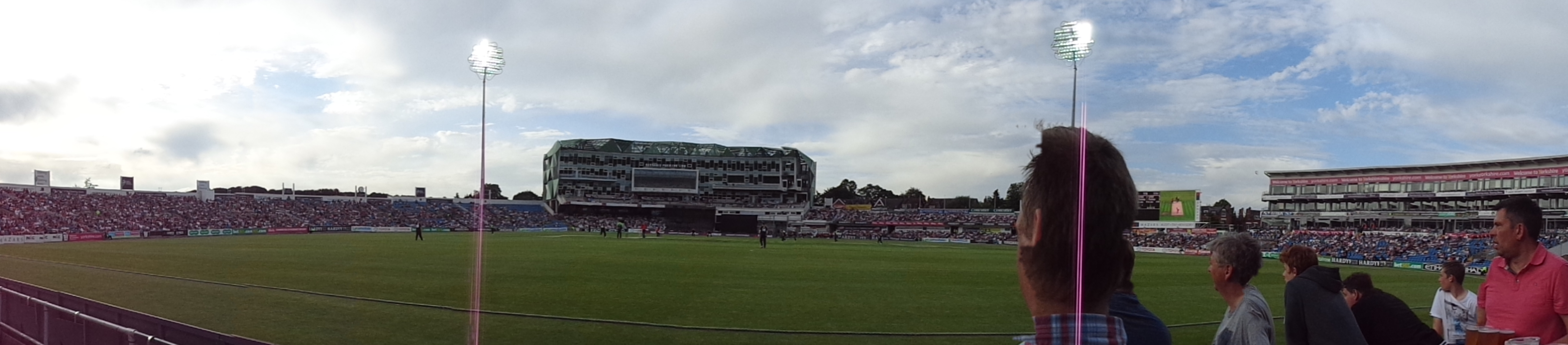
The ground during a T20 game against Durham Jets

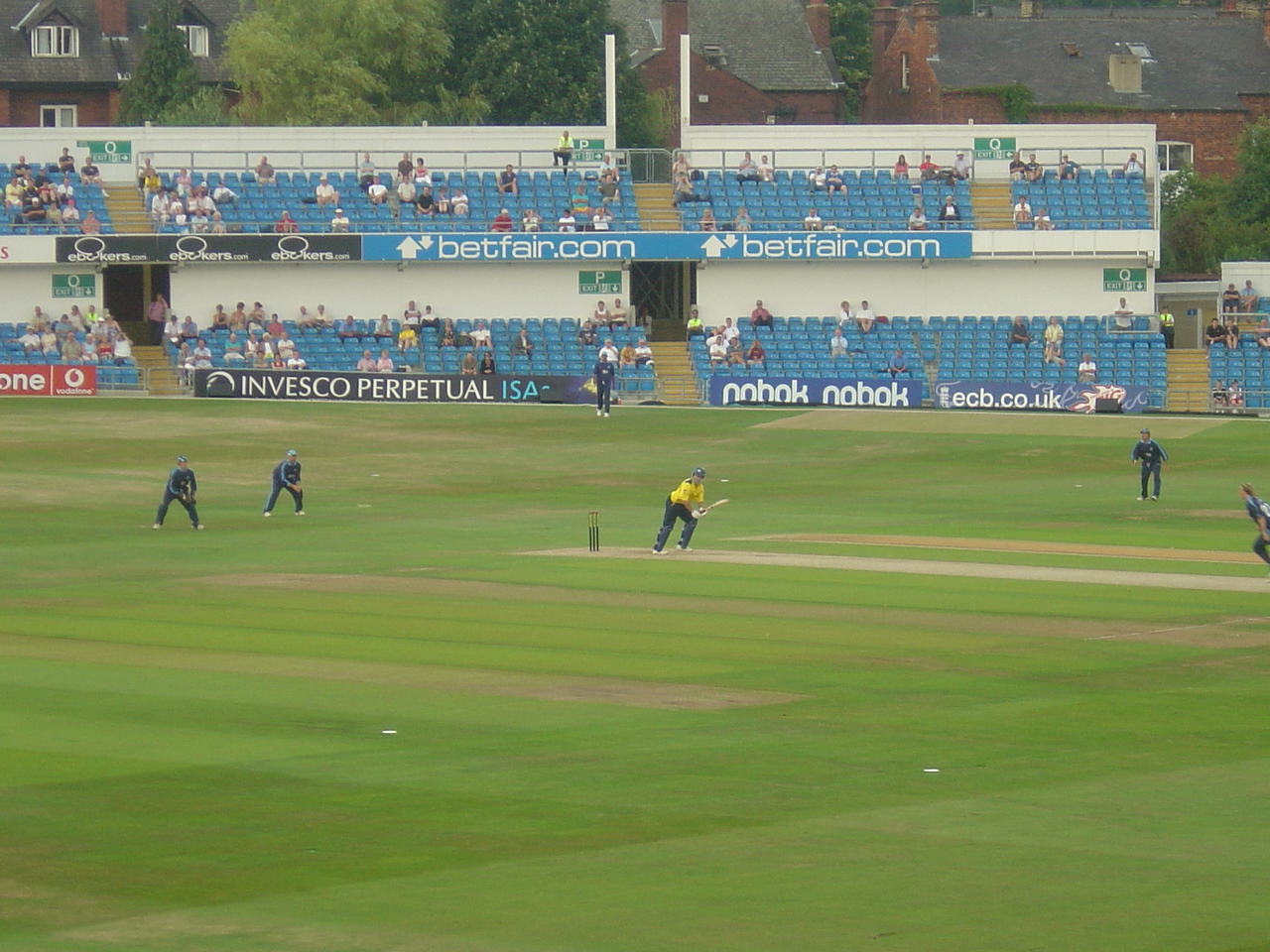
Yorkshire v Surrey 2005

It hosted four matches at the 2019 ICC Cricket World Cup.

On 25 August 2019, England chased down their highest ever fourth innings target in the third Test of the 2019 Ashes series against Australia. England scored 362–9 to win, with Ben Stokes scoring 135*, while being latterly partnered by Jack Leach who scored 1*.

In the third test of the 2023 Ashes, England had a 3-wicket win against Australia.

== Present facilities ==
The ground presently has a spectator capacity of 18,350 making it the fifth largest cricket ground in the United Kingdom by capacity. There is a large media centre to the north of the ground. Corporate facilities are situated in the Emerald Stand, the Carnegie Pavilion and the East Stand. The East Stand also contains banqueting facilities and the Headingley Lodge Hotel. The ground has floodlights enabling late play.

== Recent and future developments ==
Yorkshire County Cricket Club are expanding the ground according to a six phase masterplan with points as follows

- Phase one – the erection of four floodlights (completed 2015)
- Phase two – the rebuild of the rugby ground end in conjunction with the redevelopment of the North Stand on the rugby side (completed 2019)
- Phase three – the addition of 915 seats in the north east corner (not yet undertaken)
- Phase four – the development of a five level new pavilion, members long room and dressing facilities to sit over the existing north west corner adjacent to the Carnegie Pavilion (not yet undertaken)
- Phase five – A translucent cantilever roof to be erected over the White Rose Stand (not yet undertaken)
- Phase six – landscaping on the White Rose Stand and North East concourses (not yet undertaken)

== Test cricket records ==
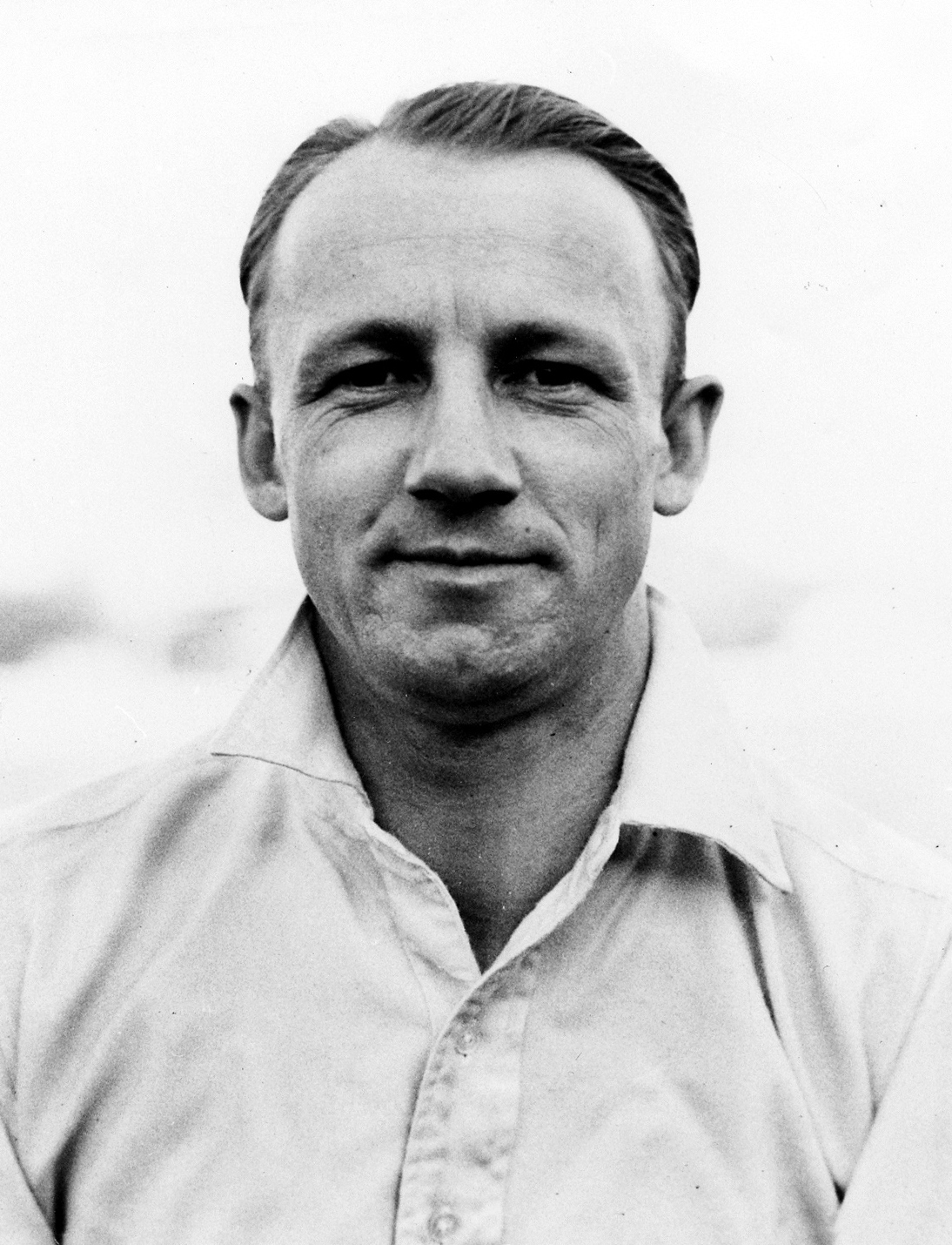
Don Bradman holds the record for most career runs at Headingley.

=== Batting ===
Most career runs
| Runs | Player | Period |
|---|---|---|
| 963 (6 innings) | (Australia) Don Bradman | 1930–1948 |
| 897 (16 innings) | (England) Geoffrey Boycott | 1964–1981 |
| 849 (17 innings) | (England) John Edrich | 1964–1975 |
| 776 (22 innings) | (England) Graham Gooch | 1978–1994 |
| 763 (19 innings) | (England) Joe Root | 2013–2025 |

Most career runs (non-England)
| Runs | Player | Period |
|---|---|---|
| 963 (6 innings) | (Australia) Don Bradman | 1930–1948 |
| 493 (6 innings) | (Australia) Ricky Ponting | 1997–2010 |
| 427 (8 innings) | (Australia) Neil Harvey | 1948–1961 |
| 374 (7 innings) | (Australia) Allan Border | 1981–1993 |
| 374 (7 innings) | (Cricket West Indies) Garfield Sobers | 1957–1969 |

Highest individual scores
| Runs | Player | Date |
|---|---|---|
| 334 v. England | (Australia) Don Bradman | 11 Jul 1930 |
| 310* v. New Zealand | (England) John Edrich | 8 Jul 1965 |
| 304 v. England | (Australia) Don Bradman | 20 Jul 1934 |
| 246* v. India | (England) Geoffrey Boycott | 8 Jun 1967 |
| 236 v. England | (South Africa) Eric Rowan | 26 Jul 1951 |

Most centuries
| Centuries | Player | Period |
|---|---|---|
| 4 (6 innings) | (Australia) Don Bradman | 1930–1948 |
| 4 (16 innings) | (England) Geoffrey Boycott | 1964–1981 |
| 3 (7 innings) | (England) Kevin Pietersen | 2006–2012 |
| 3 (11 innings) | (England) Len Hutton | 1947–1953 |
| 3 (11 innings) | (England) Peter May | 1951–1961 |

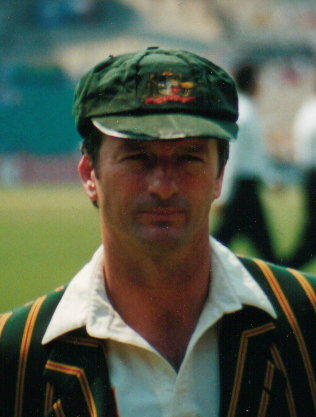
Steve Waugh averaged 338.00 with the bat, the highest of any player with 3+ matches at the ground.

Highest batting average (3+ matches)
| Average | Player | Period |
|---|---|---|
| 338.00 (3 innings, 2 NO) | (Australia) Steve Waugh | 1989–1997 |
| 192.60 (6 innings, 1 NO) | (Australia) Don Bradman | 1930–1948 |
| 108.66 (5 innings, 2 NO) | (Pakistan) Saleem Malik | 1987–1996 |
| 101.80 (7 innings, 2 NO) | (England) Cyril Washbrook | 1947–1956 |
| 85.14 (7 innings, 0 NO) | (England) Kevin Pietersen | 2006–2012 |

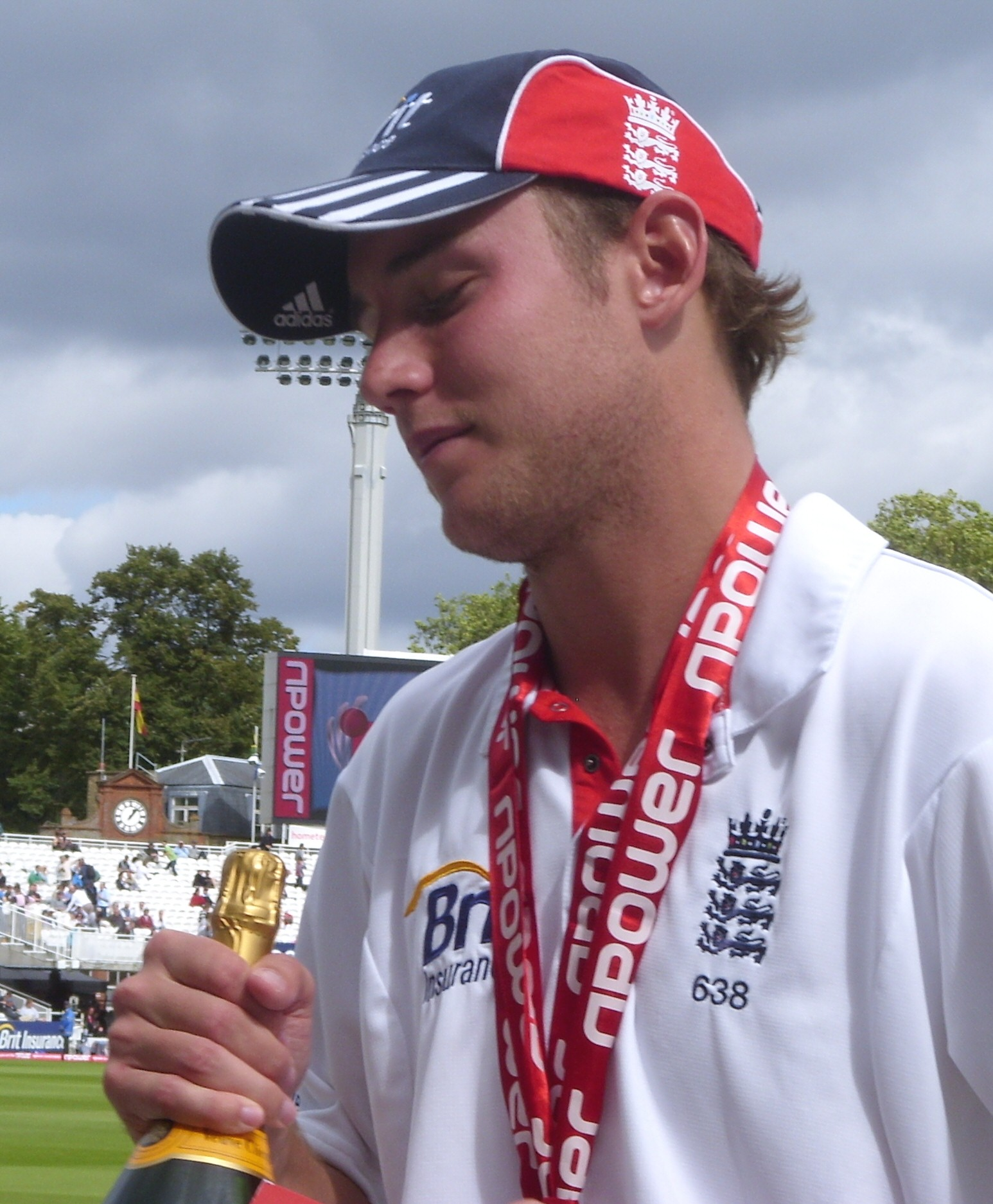
Stuart Broad has taken the most wickets at the ground, with 54.

=== Bowling ===
Most career wickets
| Wickets | Player | Period |
|---|---|---|
| 54 (23 innings) | (England) Stuart Broad | 2008–2023 |
| 44 (18 innings) | (England) Fred Trueman | 1952–1964 |
| 43 (20 innings) | (England) James Anderson | 2003–2021 |
| 40 (14 innings) | (England) Bob Willis | 1976–1984 |
| 33 (14 innings) | (England) Ian Botham | 1977–1987 |

Most career wickets (non-England)
| Wickets | Player | Period |
|---|---|---|
| 23 (7 innings) | (Cricket West Indies) Curtly Ambrose | 1988–2000 |
| 23 (8 innings) | (Cricket West Indies) Malcolm Marshall | 1980–1991 |
| 21 (6 innings) | (Pakistan) Imran Khan | 1974–1987 |
| 20 (6 innings) | (Australia) Clarrie Grimmett | 1926–1934 |
| 19 (4 innings) | (Australia) Terry Alderman | 1981–1989 |
| 19 (7 innings) | (Cricket West Indies) Garfield Sobers | 1957–1969 |

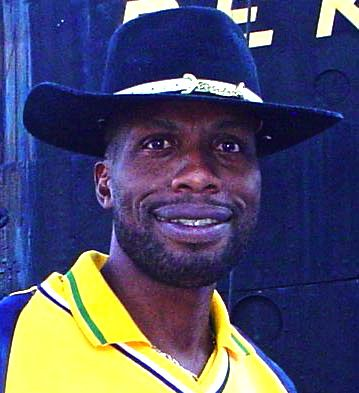
Curtly Ambrose took 23 wickets at the ground, the most by a non-Englishman.

Best innings figures
| Figures | Player | Date |
|---|---|---|
| 8/43 v. Australia | (England) Bob Willis | 16 Jul 1981 |
| 8/59 v. South Africa | (England) Colin Blythe | 29 Jul 1907 |
| 8/107 v. Pakistan | (England) Neil Foster | 2 Jul 1987 |
| 7/37 v. England | (Australia) Jason Gillespie | 24 Jul 1997 |
| 7/40 v. South Africa | (England) Colin Blythe | 29 Jul 1907 |
| 7/40 v. England | (Pakistan) Imran Khan | 2 Jul 1987 |
| 7/51 v. New Zealand | (England) Tony Lock | 3 Jul 1958 |
| 7/53 v. England | (Cricket West Indies) Malcolm Marshall | 12 Jul 1984 |
| 7/58 v. England | (Australia) Charles Macartney | 1 Jul 1909 |
| 7/70 v. England | (Cricket West Indies) Frank Worrell | 25 Jul 1957 |

Note: best innings figures limited to 10; there have actually been ten 7-wicket match hauls at Headingley.

Best match figures
| Figures | Player | Date |
|---|---|---|
| 15/99 v. South Africa | (England) Colin Blythe | 29 Jul 1907 |
| 11/65 v. New Zealand | (England) Tony Lock | 3 Jul 1958 |
| 11/85 v. England | (Australia) Charles Macartney | 1 Jul 1909 |
| 11/132 v. Australia | (England) Fred Trueman | 6 Jul 1961 |
| 11/113 v. Australia | (England) Jim Laker | 12 Jul 1956 |

Lowest strike rate (4+ innings)
| Strike rate | Player | Period |
|---|---|---|
| 22.2 (19 wickets) | (England) Colin Blythe | 1905–1907 |
| 27.3 (15 wickets) | (South Africa) Aubrey Faulkner | 1907–1912 |
| 29.9 (13 wickets) | (England) Liam Plunkett | 2007–2014 |
| 30.8 (12 wickets) | (England) Mark Wood | 2015–2023 |
| 31.5 (4 wickets) | (England) Kevin Pietersen | 2006–2012 |

=== Team records ===
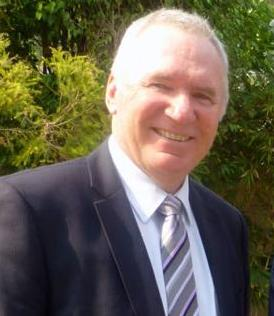
Allan Border topscored with 200*, as Australia totalled 653/4d in 1993.

Highest innings scores
| Score | Team | Date |
|---|---|---|
| 653/4d | Australia v. England | 22 Jul 1993 |
| 628/8d | India v. England | 22 Aug 2002 |
| 601/7d | Australia v. England | 8 Jun 1989 |
| 584 | Australia v. England | 20 Jul 1934 |
| 570/7d | England v. West Indies | 25 May 2007 |

Lowest completed innings
| Score | Team | Date |
|---|---|---|
| 61 | West Indies v. England | 17 Aug 2000 |
| 67 | New Zealand v. England | 3 Jul 1958 |
| 67 | England v. Australia | 22 Aug 2019 |
| 75 | South Africa v. England | 29 Jul 1907 |
| 76 | England v. South Africa | 29 Jul 1907 |

=== Partnership records ===
Highest partnerships
| Runs | Wicket | Players | Match | Date |
|---|---|---|---|---|
| 388 | 4th | Don Bradman (304) & Bill Ponsford (181) | Australia v. England | 20 Jul 1934 |
| 369 | 2nd | John Edrich (310*) & Ken Barrington (163) | England v. New Zealand | 8 Jul 1965 |
| 363 | 3rd | Mohammad Yousuf (192) & Younis Khan (173) | Pakistan v. England | 4 Aug 2006 |
| 332* | 5th | Allan Border (200*) & Steve Waugh (157*) | Australia v. England | 22 Jul 1993 |
| 301 | 2nd | Arthur Morris (182) & Don Bradman (173*) | Australia v. England | 22 Jul 1948 |

Highest partnerships by wicket
| Runs | Wicket | Players | Match | Date |
|---|---|---|---|---|
| 192 | 1st | Gordon Greenidge (115) & Roy Fredericks (109) | West Indies v. England | 22 Jul 1976 |
| 369 | 2nd | John Edrich (310*) & Ken Barrington (163) | England v. New Zealand | 8 Jul 1965 |
| 363 | 3rd | Mohammad Yousuf (192) & Younis Khan (173) | Pakistan v. England | 4 Aug 2006 |
| 388 | 4th | Don Bradman (304) & Bill Ponsford (181) | Australia v. England | 20 Jul 1934 |
| 332* | 5th | Allan Border (200*) & Steve Waugh (157*) | Australia v. England | 22 Jul 1993 |
| 160 | 6th | Kevin Pietersen (226) & Matt Prior (75) | England v. West Indies | 25 May 2007 |
| 241 | 7th | Jonny Bairstow (162) & Jamie Overton (97) | England v. New Zealand | 23 Jun 2022 |
| 150 | 8th | Gary Kirsten (130) & Monde Zondeki (59) | South Africa v. England | 21 Aug 2003 |
| 108 | 9th | George Macaulay (76) & George Geary (35*) | England v. Australia | 10 Jul 1926 |
| 103 | 10th | Tuppy Owen-Smith (129) & Sandy Bell (26*) | South Africa v. England | 13 Jul 1929 |

Last updated 25 October 2025.

== One Day International records ==
In ODIs, the highest team score achieved at Headingley is 351–9 by England against Pakistan on 19 May 2019. The leading run scorers at the ground are Eoin Morgan (477 runs), Joe Root (421 runs) and Marcus Trescothick (408 runs). The leading wicket takers are Adil Rashid (15 wickets), Chris Old (12 wickets) and Ian Botham (11 wickets).

== Other events ==
Headingley Cricket Ground's first concert occurred on Friday 18 September 2015 when ska band Madness performed in front of an audience of 7,500.

== Sponsorship ==
The ground was named the Headingley Carnegie Stadium from 2006 to 2013 under a sponsorship deal with Leeds Metropolitan University. Upon the expiry of this deal the grounds name had no sponsor and was named simply Headingley Stadium until 2017 when a deal was done with the Emerald Group Search and Selection making it the Emerald Headingley Stadium. In 2021, Emerald Group pulled out of their sponsorship with immediate effect in the aftermath of the club's racism scandal.

== Access ==
The ground is served by Headingley and Burley Park railway stations as well as the First Leeds routes 19, 19A, 56 and 91 which stop right outside the front entrance of the stadium on Kirkstall Lane. Other buses stop a short walk away on Otley Road in Headingley, including First Leeds services 22, 23, 24, 25, 27, 28, and X84.

On certain match dates the R66 Shuttle Bus will run from Leeds City Centre to the stadium bus stop on Kirkstall Lane operated by First Leeds.
