= George Cooper (cricketer) =

Australian cricketer (1907–2000)

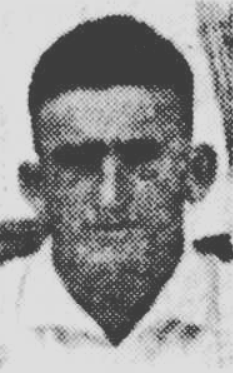

Personal information
- Full name: George Henry Cooper
- Born: 15 February 1907; Gympie, Queensland, Australia
- Died: 2 January 2000 (aged 92); Mudgeeraba, Queensland, Australia
- Source: Cricinfo, 1 October 2020

George Henry Cooper (15 February 1907 – 2 January 2000) was an Australian cricketer. He played in two first-class matches for Queensland in 1930.

== Cricket career ==
Cooper was a leg-break bowler, also described as a "dashing left-hand batsman... and very good in the field", who played for Warwick in Queensland Country cricket. He was sent to represent Warwick during a Country Week cricket carnival in 1930 which earned him selection in the Queensland State side. When he departed Warwick to play in his first match the staff of the railway station office assembled to see him off with the assistant general manager presenting him with a cricket bat. He was selected for his batting and not his bowling, however he injured his knee while fielding which prevented him from batting. He was selected for Queensland a second time in late 1930.

By 1934, he had moved to Bundaberg and played some seasons for the Millaquin team in the local competition. In 1936, he married and found work in Brisbane moving to the city with a local paper reporting he would be a good recruit for a district team, and as of 1937 he was playing for Northern Suburbs. In 1942, he played in a special cricket match organized to entertain Troops stationed in Brisbane.

== Military service ==
During World War II, Cooper served in the Australian Army between September 1942 and November 1945, reaching the rank of corporal. His final posting on discharge was the 2/123rd Brigade Workshops.

== See also ==
- List of Queensland first-class cricketers
