= Liu Songsheng =

Chinese footballer (1916–2000)

Personal information
- Date of birth: 1916
- Date of death: 1 January 2000 (aged 83–84)

International career
Years	Team	Apps	(Gls)
- China

Liu Songsheng (1916 – 1 January 2000) was a Chinese footballer. He competed in the men's tournament at the 1948 Summer Olympics.
