= Gunnar Kroge =

Norwegian ice hockey player

Personal information
- Born: 18 October 1930 Oslo, Norway
- Died: 24 January 2000 (aged 69)

Sport
- Sport: Ice hockey

Gunnar Kroge (18 October 1930 – 24 January 2000) was a Norwegian ice hockey player, born in Oslo, Norway. He played for the Norwegian national ice hockey team, and participated at the 1952 Winter Olympics in Oslo, where the Norwegian team placed 9th.
