= Vasile Cristea =

Vasile Cristea, A.A.
- Official of the Roman Curia; Titular Bishop of Lebedus
- Church: Romanian Greek Catholic Church
- In office: 2 July 1960—10 October 1987

Orders
- Ordination: 27 March 1932
- Consecration: 8 September 1960 by Bishop Giovanni Mele

Personal details
- Born: 24 February 1906 Șomoștelnic, Kis-Küküllő County, Austria-Hungary (now Romania)
- Died: January 17, 2000 (aged 93) Rome, Italy

Vasile Cristea, A.A. (24 February 1906 – 17 January 2000) was a Romanian Greek Catholic hierarch, an Official of the Roman Curia, an Apostolic Visitor for the Romanian Greek Catholic Church in diaspora, and as Titular Bishop of Lebedus.

Born in Șomoștelnic, Austria-Hungary, now in Romania, Cristea joined the Assumptionist Fathers and was ordained as a Greek Catholic priest on 27 March 1932. In 1936 he was appointed as the first rector of the Pio Romeno Pontifical College in Rome. He was made a bishop by Pope John XXIII on 2 July 1960, being consecrated to the Episcopate on 8 September 1960. The principal consecrator was Bishop Giovanni Mele, assisted by Bishops Giuseppe Perniciaro and Platon Kornyljak.

As Apostolic Visitor for the Romanian Greek Catholic Church in diaspora, Bishop Cristea always resided in the Vatican and had the care of Romanian Greek Catholic missions in Europe (including Paris, Munich, Madrid, France, Germany, and England) and the United States. Notably, he visited St. Helena Parish in Cleveland, Ohio, in 1961 – becoming the first Romanian Bishop to visit parishes in America after the Greek-Catholic Church in Romania had been dissolved. He returned to the parish in 1966, consecrating the church once more.

Bishop Cristea retired on 10 October 1987. He died in Rome on 17 January 2000.
