= Ismael Ramzi =

Egyptian diver

Personal information
- Nationality: Egyptian
- Born: 29 August 1917
- Died: 8 January 2000 (aged 82)

Sport
- Sport: Diving

Ismael Ramzi (29 August 1917 – 8 January 2000) was an Egyptian diver. He competed at the 1936 Summer Olympics and the 1948 Summer Olympics.
