= John Cadusch =

Australian rules footballer, born 1914

Personal information
- Full name: John Cadusch
- Born: 14 January 1914
- Died: 25 January 2000 (aged 86)
- Original team: East Malvern Amateurs
- Height: 178 cm (5 ft 10 in)
- Weight: 80 kg (176 lb)

Playing career^{1}
Years	Club	Games (Goals)
1936	Fitzroy	7 (0)
- ^{1} Playing statistics correct to the end of 1936.

John Cadusch (14 January 1914 – 25 January 2000) was an Australian rules footballer who played with Fitzroy in the Victorian Football League (VFL).
