= 240th Infantry Division =

- Country: Nazi Germany
- Branch: Army
- Type: Infantry
- Size: Division
- Garrison/HQ: Bielefeld

The 240th Infantry Division for special deployment (German: 240. Infanterie-Division z.b.V.) was a z.b.V. staff of the German Heer during World War II. While nominally a divisional staff, it was de facto a corps-level unit. It was only active from April to June 1942.

== Operational history ==
The 240. Infanterie-Division z.b.V. was formed in Bielefeld on 16 April 1942 for deployment in the occupied Netherlands. The division's only commander was Joseph Lehmann.

Throughout its short lifespan, which lasted from 16 April 1942 to 15 June 1942, the 240th Infantry Division oversaw the 82nd Infantry Division, 167th Infantry Division and 719th Infantry Division.

On 15 June 1942, the 240th Infantry Division, which had already effectively been a corps command, was formally upgraded and redesignated LXXXVIII [88th] Army Corps.

== Noteworthy individuals ==
- Joseph Lehmann, commander of the 240th Infantry Division.
