= Phil Crowe (rugby union) =

Irish rugby union player

- Full name: Philip Martin Crowe
- Born: 24 August 1910 Dublin, Ireland
- Died: 13 January 2000 (aged 89) Sandymount, Dublin, Ireland
- School: Blackrock College
- Notable relative(s): Morgan Crowe (brother); James Crowe (nephew)

Rugby union career
- Position: Centre
International career
Years	Team	Apps	(Points)
1935–38	Ireland	2	(2)

Philip Martin Crowe (24 August 1910 — 13 January 2000) was an Irish international rugby union player.

Born in Dublin, Crowe was the younger brother of Ireland centre Morgan Crowe and attended Blackrock College.

Crowe played for Blackrock College RFC and gained two international caps, debuting at Twickenham as a centre against England in Ireland's championship-winning 1935 Home Nations campaign, despite them dropping this match. His second cap came against the same opponent at Lansdowne Road in 1938, which he had to play out of position at fullback

== See also ==
- List of Ireland national rugby union players
