= Marcello Creti =

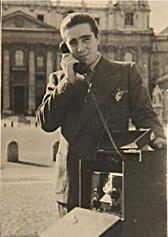
Marcello Creti

Marcello Creti (16 April 1922, in Rome – 1 January 2000, in Sutri) was an Italian inventor, gem prospector, and reported healer who for a time led a group in a farm called Sapientia. In youth he was hailed for his inventions and in 1940 won the Gold Medal of the Fascist Syndicate of Inventors. One of these inventions involved the automobile. Later in life he became known for his eccentric views and was included in The Big Book of Weirdos by Carl A Posey and Gahan Wilson.

== Biography ==
Born in Rome into a wealthy family, Creti claims that, from an early age, he would see complex machines and diagrams in his dreams or while in a trance, which he would then reproduce when he regained consciousness and begin to patent.

His father, a Kardecist spiritism, believes that his son's activity is attributable to other entities and therefore encourages his son to participate in séances until Marcello himself becomes convinced that he is a Mediumship. He immediately attracted the attention of newspapers (which referred to him as Italy's youngest inventor) and Benito Mussolini himself, who received him and encouraged him. In 1947, he purchased the ruins of the Benedictine monastery of San Luca located in the municipality of Guarcino to establish the Centro Romano Esperimenti Tecnico Industriali (C.R.E.T.I.) (Roman Center for Technical and Industrial Experiments), where, among other activities, he gave free lessons to underprivileged children. In the 1960s, he set aside, albeit not completely, his work as an inventor to devote himself to exploration, which was another of his great passions.

He undertook numerous journeys; the most famous, which was followed by the production of a documentary, was to the North Pole. In the 1970s, his studies focused on Archaeology and Mineralogy. The large amount of material he found enabled him to open a permanent mining exhibition at the Marcello Creti Cultural Association in Sutri.

He founded the Ergoniani group in Sutri, which aims to prepare “supermen and superwomen” thanks to Ergos, or the radiant energy that governs all scienceref. However, Creti subsequently abolished this name and everything related to it, continuing its activities as the “Marcello Creti Cultural Association.”

He died in 2000 shortly after appearing on the Maurizio Costanzo Show.
