= George Davis (robber) =

British criminal

- Born: 1941 (age 84–85); Bletchley, England
- Occupation: Stoppo (getaway) driver
- Spouse(s): Rose (div. 1976); Jennifer
- Children: 2
- Conviction: Armed robbery (three times)
- Penalty: 20 years (released under Prerogative of Mercy); 15 years 18 months

George Davis (born 1941) is an English armed robber, born in Bletchley,. He became known through a successful campaign by friends and supporters to free him from prison after his wrongful conviction in March 1975, for an armed payroll robbery at the London Electricity Board (LEB) offices in Ilford, Greater London, on 4 April 1974. Following his release, Davis was jailed for two cases of armed robbery.

== Evidence ==
A number of blood samples (matching different blood groups) were recovered and formed part of the prosecution case. At a number of specific locations, Davis was identified but the blood obtained from each location did not match his; neither did it match any of his 4 co-accused. Of the four, only Davis was convicted.

A further complication turned on the fact that Davis might never have been committed for trial from the lower courts had blood test results been disclosed at the committal stage. Although it subsequently became clear that evidence had by then become available to police, it was suppressed and this abuse of due process became one of the core allegations relied upon by those campaigning for the release of Davis.

"The blood samples taken from ... Davis ... at Walthamstow on 18 May 1974 were passed on to the Yard's Senior Scientific Officer, Peter Martin, on 21 May and he reported his negative findings to the police officer in charge of the case on 20 June. At as late as November 1974 on a third bail application, this time before a judge in chambers, and after committals had been completed (28 October) the police were saying that they still awaited the blood results from forensic."

== Campaign for release ==
=== Public activism ===
On 19 August 1975, while Davis was serving a 20-year prison sentence for the Ilford LEB robbery, his supporters dug holes in the pitch and poured oil over one end of the wicket at the Headingley Cricket Ground, preventing further play in the Test match between England and Australia. This direct action protest by relatives and friends of George Davis was accompanied by Davis Campaign graffiti proclaiming "FREE GEORGE DAVIS ... JUSTICE FOR GEORGE DAVIS ... GEORGE DAVIS IS INNOCENT ... SORRY IT HAD TO [BE] DONE". Three men and one woman were tried for this incident, and one, Peter Chappell, was eventually jailed for 18 months. The Davis campaigners who were remanded to prison to await trial for the Headingley sabotage continued their campaigning in support of one another within the prison system. One, Geraldine Hughes, refused to accept bail until it had also been granted to all of her co-accused. The campaign was also characterised by the graffiti “GEORGE DAVIS IS INNOCENT OK” or some variant thereof, in plain white paint, appearing on dozens of walls and bridges in London and on motorways.

=== Celebrity support ===
Roger Daltrey of The Who went on stage in 1975 wearing a T-shirt saying "George Davis Is Innocent". "George Davis Is Innocent" was a song on Sham 69's 1978 debut album Tell Us the Truth, and the song "The Cockney Kids Are Innocent" ends with a namecheck. Patrik Fitzgerald also showed support with "George" on the 1979 EP The Paranoid Ward. Davis was mentioned in the Duran Duran song "Friends of Mine" on the album Duran Duran (1981): the chorus begins "Georgie Davis is coming out".

The back cover of the Tom Robinson Band's LP Power in the Darkness (1978) contains a cropped photo of the band seated on a street in front of a wall; the 2004 CD issue of that album shows the uncropped photo, showing the wall contained the graffito "GEORGE DAVIS IS GUILTY".

=== Related campaigns ===
Importantly, the original campaign to free Davis overlapped with, variously influenced, and was in turn influenced by other criminal justice campaigns in London, particularly the Free George Ince Campaign. Ince, another London victim of identification evidence, was also eventually freed. Although the "EAST END SOLIDARITY CAMPAIGN...TO STOP EAST END FIT UPS" (October 1975, UPAL/INCE Campaign political poster) had pre-dated the Davis Campaign, it went on to parallel it.

Both campaigns had support from London political activists who had a history of organising radical defence campaigns around the criminal justice system. In particular, among these core activists (who had supported and helped organise "defence campaigns" in connection with The Angry Brigade arrests and criminal prosecutions) were a number who went on to establish Up Against The Law (UPAL), a London-based "political collective". This Collective publicised the Ince case and went on to produce the most detailed publicly available investigation of the 1974 Davis Case armed robbery.

In September 1975, Peter Chappell while awaiting trial in prison for the August 1975 Headingley sabotage, wrote to UPAL:

"When this campaign started 18 months ago I was completely on my own and, if the truth were known, I was probably being labelled as a well meaning nut case, even in East London with no friends at all that I could seriously talk to about Davis’s case… I value UPAL’S help a great deal … I thought that I must find other people and that if I make sacrifices then sooner or later others would join the fight…. George Davis is not on his own any more thanks to people like you. There are more things twixt life and death than a pound note."

Some of UPAL's core activists, involved with both the Davis and Ince Campaigns, had also had late '60s early '70s activist connections with the Release Collective.

== Release ==
In May 1976, despite a then-recent Court of Appeal decision (11 December 1975) not to overturn Davis's criminal conviction, the Home Secretary, Roy Jenkins, on partial completion of a police review of the case, agreed to recommend the release of Davis without further referral back to the Court of Appeal. Jenkins undertook this highly exceptional exercise of the Royal Prerogative of Mercy because of doubts over the evidence presented by the police which helped convict Davis. Davis's release was announced on 11 May 1976.

At the time of Davis's release, former Home Office Minister Alex Lyon wrote at some length to explain the genuine difficulties he had faced in seeking to resolve the constitutional difficulties he saw as preventing Davis's release from a conviction that he had regarded as unsafe.

According to a BBC Radio 4 documentary, although Davis was released because his conviction was deemed to be "unsafe" by the Home Secretary he extraordinarily held that Davis was not held to be "innocent". The period of official embargo on the release to the Public Record Office of official papers, related to the 1976 decision to free Davis, has now been extended by 20 years until 2026.

However, according to a report in The Independent written by the newspaper's Law Editor, Robert Verkaik, Davis and one of his original trial barristers, David Whitehouse, later a QC, intended to make representations to the Criminal Cases Review Commission in the hope that they would return to court citing new evidence and establish Davis's innocence and seek compensation for his period of imprisonment. The appeal was heard "explicitly on the basis that (Davis) has no expectation of compensation or other recognition. His reputation is, clearly, that of an armed robber whatever the result".

On 24 May 2011, Davis's conviction for the 1974 raid on the London Electricity Board was quashed by three judges at the Court of Appeal. One of the judges, Lord Justice Hughes, said that the conviction, based on dubious identification evidence, was unsafe but that the court was not able positively to exonerate Davis.

== Further robberies ==
In 1978, two years after his release from prison, Davis was jailed again, having pleaded guilty to involvement in an armed bank raid on 23 September 1977 at the Bank of Cyprus, Seven Sisters Road, London. Davis was caught at the wheel of the getaway van with weapons beside him; in the raid shots were fired and a security guard clubbed to the ground. He was released early in 1984 but jailed again in 1987 for attempting to steal mailbags. Davis pleaded guilty.

== Personal life ==
Some time after his release from prison in 1976, Davis separated from his first wife Rose. Some years later he married Jennifer, the daughter of a North London police Chief Inspector.

His first wife, Rose Dean-Davis (d. 31 January 2009), wrote a book, The Wars of Rosie: Hard Knocks, Endurance and the 'George Davis Is Innocent' Campaign in 2008.
