= 1983 Cricket World Cup final =

1983 Prudential World Cup Final match
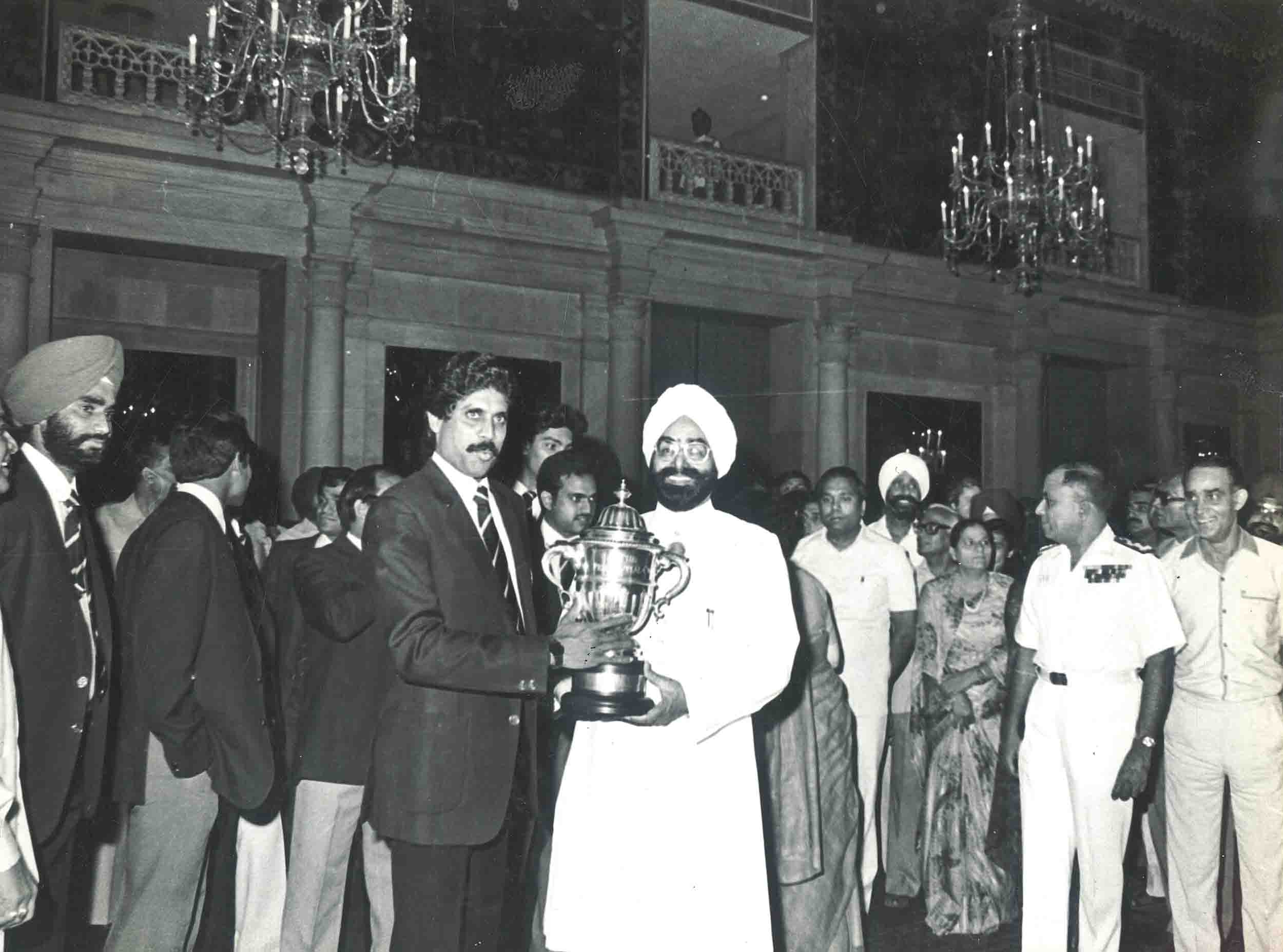
- Kapil Dev with the Indian President Zail Singh after the team's return to India post winning the World Cup. They are holding the Cricket World Cup Trophy.
- Event: 1983 Prudential Cup
India	West Indies
(India)	(Cricket West Indies)
183	140
54.4 overs	52 overs
- India won by 43 runs
- Date: 25 June 1983
- Venue: Lord's Cricket Ground, London
- Player of the match: Mohinder Amarnath (Ind)
- Umpires: Dickie Bird (Eng) and Barrie Meyer (Eng)
- Attendance: 24,609

The final of the 1983 Cricket World Cup was played between India and the West Indies at Lord's, London on 25 June 1983. This was the third consecutive World Cup final appearance for the West Indies, having won the last two Cricket World Cups. India, playing in their first final, defeated the West Indies to claim their first World Cup title. Mohinder Amarnath was awarded with the man of the match award for scoring 26 runs and taking 3 wickets.

== Background ==
The match was the third consecutive World Cup final hosted at Lord's, following those in 1975 and 1979. India was making their first appearance at a World Cup final after defeating England by 6 wickets in the first semi-finals. This was also the first appearance by an Asian nation in a World Cup final. In fact, in the prior two world cups in 1975 and 1979, the Indian team had won only one match (against East Africa) and lost every other match. On the other hand, the West Indies had won both previous editions of the World Cup. They had reached a third consecutive final after defeating Pakistan by 8 wickets in the second semi-final and were looking for their third consecutive World Cup win.

As a result, the Indian team was only given odds of 66–1 at the start of the final.

== Match details ==
After losing the toss, India was asked to bat first against a West Indies team that arguably boasted the world's best bowling attack. Sunil Gavaskar, who had a generally unsuccessful tournament, got dismissed early on for two. A partnership between Krishnamachari Srikkanth and Mohinder Amarnath took India past the 50 mark, before the former was taken lbw by Marshall. Amarnath was then bowled by Holding for 26, and only eleven more runs were made before Yashpal Sharma fell. Kapil Dev, the Indian captain, took 8 balls to reach 15, but was caught off the bowling of Larry Gomes; leaving India at 110/5. Kirti Azad didn't score any runs. Roger Binny was caught on two, while Sandeep Patil made 27 to get India to 153/8. All-rounder Madan Lal soon followed for 17, and 10th wicket partnership made 22 runs before Michael Holding bowled Syed Kirmani for 14. India were thus bowled out for 183 in 54.4 overs, which many thought was easily reachable. Andy Roberts had claimed three wickets, and Malcolm Marshall, Michael Holding and Larry Gomes took two wickets each. Sandeep Patil and Madan Lal saved the game to get the team past the 150-run mark at a critical point in the match where India scored 183 runs. After India was bowled out for just 183 runs, Kapil Dev told everyone to fight for every single run. The first over by Kapil Dev was a Maiden.

The West Indies set out to chase the low target of 184 but lost an early wicket when Balwinder Sandhu famously clean bowled Gordon Greenidge. Desmond Haynes and Viv Richards, batted smoothly past 50, but both batsmen were removed by the bowling of Madan Lal, leaving the West Indies at 57/3. Lal soon claimed a third wicket – that of Gomes – and Dev then caught West Indies captain Clive Lloyd, leaving the West Indies at 66/5. Ten runs later, Faoud Bacchus was removed by Sandhu. Jeff Dujon and Malcolm Marshall put on a partnership of 43 runs before Mohinder Amarnath dismissed them on 119 and 124 respectively. Soon, Kapil Dev trapped Andy Roberts for an lbw, and Amarnath got Michael Holding out LBW. The West Indies were thus all out for 140, and India had won their maiden Cricket World Cup by 43 runs. The Indian bowlers had completed one of the biggest upsets in cricket history, defeating the previously invincible West Indies. Both Amarnath and Lal had taken three wickets for India, while Sandhu claimed two. Amarnath was awarded the Man of the Match for his all-round performance. There was no "Man of the Series" award in 1983.

25 June 1983
Scorecard

India; 183 (54.4 overs)	v	West Indies; 140 (52 overs)
Krishnamachari Srikkanth 38 (57); Andy Roberts 3/32 (10 overs)		Viv Richards 33 (28); Mohinder Amarnath 3/12 (7 overs)

India won by 43 runs
Lord's, London, England
Attendance : 24,609
Umpires: Dickie Bird (Eng) and Barrie Meyer (Eng)
Player of the match: Mohinder Amarnath (Ind)

- West Indies won the toss and elected to field.
- Faoud Bacchus (WI) played his final international match.

== Scorecard ==
1st innings

India batting
Player	Status	Runs	Balls	4s	6s	Strike rate
Sunil Gavaskar	c †Dujon b Roberts	2	12	0	0	16.66
Krishnamachari Srikkanth	lbw b Marshall	38	57	7	1	66.66
Mohinder Amarnath	b Holding	26	80	3	0	32.50
Yashpal Sharma	c sub (AL Logie) b Gomes	11	32	1	0	34.37
Sandeep Patil	c Gomes b Garner	27	29	0	1	93.10
Kapil Dev *	c Holding b Gomes	15	8	3	0	187.50
Kirti Azad	c Garner b Roberts	0	3	0	0	0.00
Roger Binny	c Garner b Roberts	2	8	0	0	25.00
Madan Lal	b Marshall	17	27	0	1	62.96
Syed Kirmani †	b Holding	14	43	0	0	32.55
Balwinder Sandhu	not out	11	30	1	0	36.66
Extras	(b 5, lb 5, w 9, nb 1)	20				
Total	(all out; 54.4 overs)	183		15	3	3.34

Fall of wickets: 1/2 (S. Gavaskar), 2/59 (K. Srikkanth), 3/90 (M. Amarnath), 4/92 (Y. Sharma), 5/110 (K. Dev), 6/111 (K. Azad), 7/130 (R. Binny), 8/153 (S. Patil), 9/161 (Madan Lal), 10/183 (S. Kirmani)

West Indies bowling
Bowler	Overs	Maidens	Runs	Wickets	Econ	Wides	NBs
Andy Roberts	10	3	32	3	3.20	0	0
Joel Garner	12	4	24	1	2.00	0	0
Malcolm Marshall	11	1	24	2	2.18	0	0
Michael Holding	9.4	2	26	2	2.68	0	0
Larry Gomes	11	1	49	2	4.45	0	0
Viv Richards	1	0	8	0	8.00	0	0

2nd innings

West Indies batting
Player	Status	Runs	Balls	4s	6s	Strike rate
Gordon Greenidge	b Sandhu	1	12	0	0	8.33
Desmond Haynes	c Binny b Madan Lal	13	33	2	0	39.39
Viv Richards	c K. Dev b Madan Lal	33	28	7	0	117.85
Clive Lloyd *	c K. Dev b Binny	8	17	1	0	47.05
Larry Gomes	c Gavaskar b Madan Lal	5	16	0	0	31.25
Faoud Bacchus	c †Kirmani b Sandhu	8	25	0	0	32.00
Jeff Dujon †	b Amarnath	25	73	0	1	34.24
Malcolm Marshall	c Gavaskar b Amarnath	18	51	0	0	35.29
Andy Roberts	lbw b K. Dev	4	14	0	0	28.57
Joel Garner	not out	5	19	0	0	26.31
Michael Holding	lbw b Amarnath	6	24	0	0	25.00
Extras	(lb 4, w 10)	14				
Total	(all out; 52 overs)	140		10	1	2.69

Fall of wickets: 1/5 (G. Greenidge), 2/50 (D. Haynes), 3/57 (V. Richards), 4/66 (L. Gomes), 5/66 (C. Lloyd), 6/76 (F. Bacchus), 7/119 (J. Dujon), 8/124 (M. Marshall), 9/126 (A. Roberts), 10/140 (M. Holding)

India bowling
Bowler	Overs	Maidens	Runs	Wickets	Econ	Wides	NBs
Kapil Dev	11	4	21	1	1.90	0	0
Balwinder Sandhu	9	1	32	2	3.55	0	0
Madan Lal	12	2	31	3	2.58	0	0
Roger Binny	10	1	23	1	2.30	0	0
Mohinder Amarnath	7	0	12	3	1.71	0	0
Kirti Azad	3	0	7	0	2.33	0	0

== In popular culture ==
- 1983, a 2014 Indian Malayalam language film that had the core of its story based on the 1983 Cricket World Cup. It centered on Rameshan, played by Nivin Pauly, and his memories from 1983, when India won its first World Cup title.
- Sachin: A Billion Dreams, a 2017 sports documentary film in which the 1983 victory is a central theme and it is depicted as pivotal, life-changing moment that inspired Sachin Tendulkar to pursue a career in cricket and dream of winning the World Cup himself.
- The 2021 Indian biographical film 83 portrays team India's triumph in the World Cup. Indian actor Ranveer Singh played the role of India's captain Kapil Dev.

== See also ==
- ICC Cricket World Cup
