= International cricket in 1976 =

International cricket season

The 1976 International cricket season was from May 1976 to August 1976.

== Season overview ==
International tours
Start date (Note: Date of the first match between the two sides, not including any warm-up matches.)	Teams (Note: Men's teams unless otherwise noted.)		Results (matches)			
Start date	Home	Away	Test	ODI	FC	LA
3 June 1976	England	West Indies	0–3 (5)	0–3 (3)	—	—
19 June 1976	England women	Australia women	0–0 (3)	2–1 (3)	—	—
7 August 1976	Scotland	Ireland	—	—	0–0 (1)	—
27 August 1976	West Indies Young Cricketers	England Young Cricketers	0–1 (1)	0–1 (1)	—	—

== International tours ==
=== West Indies in England ===
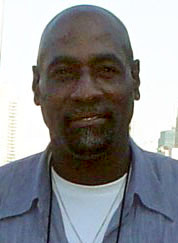
Viv Richards scored the most runs during the West Indies tour of England.

The West Indies travelled to England on the back of a busy schedule which had seen them play Australia and India during the 1975–76 season, which led some commentators to speculate that they might be jaded. The first two Test matches were drawn; the Wisden editor blamed the West Indies' lack of a spin bowler as preventing them from winning the first match, while in the second match a whole day was lost to rain with England on top. The West Indies won the three remaining Test matches to win the series 3–0, largely due to their fast bowlers. Viv Richards scored two double centuries, and finished as the leading run-scorer on either team, despite missing the second Test with an injury.

In the three-match One Day International series, Richards was again dominant in the first two games, scoring 119 and 97 to help the West Indies to victories. In the third ODI, when Richards was dismissed without scoring, Gordon Greenidge scored 42 and Clive Lloyd made 79 to guide their side to a 50-run win. The last two matches were each affected by rain; the second ODI was spread over two days, while the third utilised the reserve day after no play was possible at all on first day.

Wisden Trophy Test series: West Indies won 3–0
Test no.	Date	Venue	Result
777	3–8 June	Trent Bridge, Nottingham	Match drawn
778	17–22 June	Lord's, London	Match drawn
779	8–13 July	Old Trafford, Manchester	West Indies won by 425 runs
780	22–27 July	Headingley, Leeds	West Indies won by 55 runs
781	12–17 August	The Oval, London	West Indies won by 231 runs

Prudential Trophy ODI series: West Indies won 3–0
ODI no.	Date	Venue	Result
37	26 August	Old Trafford, Manchester	West Indies won by 6 wickets
38	28–29 August	Lord's, London	West Indies won by 36 runs
39	30–31 August	Edgbaston, Birmingham	West Indies won by 50 runs

=== Australia women in England ===
The Australia national women's cricket team was invited to England to help celebrate the fiftieth anniversary of the Women's Cricket Association.

Test series: Series drawn, 0–0
Test no.	Date	Venue	Result
49	19–21 June	Old Trafford, Manchester	Match drawn
50	3–5 July	Edgbaston, Birmingham	Match drawn
51	24–27 July	The Oval, London	Match drawn

ODI series: England won 2–1
ODI no.	Date	Venue	Result
21	1 August	St Lawrence Ground, Canterbury	Australia won by 87 runs
22	4 August	Lord's, London	England won by 8 wickets
23	8 August	Trent Bridge, Nottingham	England won by 9 wickets

=== Ireland in Scotland ===
Ireland in Scotland
Match no.	Classification	Date	Venue	Result
31,204	First-class	7–10 August	Hamilton Crescent, Glasgow	Match drawn
14,455	Unclassified 60-over match	8 August	Titwood, Birmingham	Scotland won by 102 runs

=== England Young Cricketers in the West Indies ===
Test series: England won 1–0
Youth Test no.	Date	Venue	Result
4	27–30 August	Queen's Park Oval, Port of Spain, Trinidad and Tobago	England won by 22 runs

ODI series: England won 1–0
Youth ODI no.	Date	Venue	Result
1	31 August	Guaracara Park, Pointe-a-Pierre, Trinidad and Tobago	England won on faster scoring rate

== Bibliography ==
- Preston, Norman (1977). "West Indies in England, 1976". In Preston, Norman (ed.). Wisden Cricketers' Almanack 1977 (114 ed.). London: Sporting Handbooks. ISBN 085020-052-0.
- Rheinberg, Netta (1977). "Women's cricket, 1976". In Preston, Norman (ed.). Wisden Cricketers' Almanack 1977 (114 ed.). London: Sporting Handbooks. ISBN 085020-052-0.
