= International cricket in 1980 =

International cricket season

The 1980 International cricket season was from May 1980 to August 1980.

== Season overview ==
International tours
Start date	Home team	Away team	Results [Matches]			
Start date	Home team	Away team	Test	ODI	FC	LA
28 May 1980	England	West Indies	0–1 [5]	1–1 [2]	—	—
20 August 1980	England	Australia	0–0 [1]	2–0 [2]	—	—

== May ==
=== West Indies in England ===
Prudential Trophy ODI series
No.	Date	Home captain	Away captain	Venue	Result
ODI 89	28–29 May	Ian Botham	Clive Lloyd	Headingley, Leeds	West Indies by 24 runs
ODI 90	30 May	Ian Botham	Vivian Richards	Lord's, London	England by 3 wickets
Wisden Trophy Test series
No.	Date	Home captain	Away captain	Venue	Result
Test 880	5–10 June	Ian Botham	Clive Lloyd	Trent Bridge, Nottingham	West Indies by 2 wickets
Test 881	19–24 June	Ian Botham	Clive Lloyd	Lord's, London	Match drawn
Test 882	10–15 July	Ian Botham	Clive Lloyd	Old Trafford Cricket Ground, Manchester	Match drawn
Test 883	29–24 July	Ian Botham	Clive Lloyd	Kennington Oval, London	Match drawn
Test 884	7–12 August	Ian Botham	Vivian Richards	Headingley, Leeds	Match drawn

== August ==
=== Australia in England ===
Prudential Trophy ODI series
No.	Date	Home captain	Away captain	Venue	Result
ODI 91	20 August	Ian Botham	Greg Chappell	Kennington Oval, London	England by 24 runs
ODI 92	22 August	Ian Botham	Greg Chappell	Edgbaston Cricket Ground, Birmingham	England by 3 wickets
Centenary Test Match
No.	Date	Home captain	Away captain	Venue	Result
Test 885	28 Aug–2 September	Ian Botham	Greg Chappell	Lord's, London	Match drawn
