= 83 (film) =

2021 Indian film by Kabir Khan

- Theatrical release poster
- Directed by: Kabir Khan
- Written by: Kabir Khan; Sanjay Puran Singh Chauhan; Vasan Bala
- Dialogues by: Kabir Khan; Sumit Arora
- Produced by: Kabir Khan; Vishnu Vardhan Induri; Sajid Nadiadwala; Deepika Padukone
- Starring: Ranveer Singh; Deepika Padukone; Pankaj Tripathi; Jiiva; Tahir Raj Bhasin; Saqib Saleem; Jatin Sarna; Chirag Patil; Dinker Sharma; Nishant Dahiya; Harrdy Sandhu; Sahil Khattar; Ammy Virk; Adinath Kothare; Dhairya Karwa; R. Badree
- Cinematography: Aseem Mishra
- Edited by: Nitin Baid
- Music by: Songs: Pritam; Score: Julius Packiam
- Production companies: Reliance Entertainment; Phantom Films; Vibri Media; KA Productions; Nadiadwala Grandson Entertainment; Kabir Khan Films
- Distributed by: PVR Pictures
- Release dates: 15 December 2021 (Red Sea International Film Festival); 24 December 2021 (India)
- Running time: 160 minutes
- Country: India
- Languages: Hindi; English
- Budget: ₹225–270 crore
- Box office: est. ₹193.73 crore

83 is a 2021 Indian Hindi-language biographical sports drama film written and directed by Kabir Khan and produced by Deepika Padukone, Kabir Khan, Vishnu Vardhan Induri and Sajid Nadiadwala. Based on the India national cricket team led by Kapil Dev, which won the 1983 Cricket World Cup, and jointly written by Khan, along with Sanjay Puran Singh Chauhan, Vasan Bala and Sumit Arora, it features an ensemble cast including Ranveer Singh, Deepika Padukone, Pankaj Tripathi, Tahir Raj Bhasin, Jiiva, Saqib Saleem, Jatin Sarna, Chirag Patil, Dinker Sharma, Nishant Dahiya, Harrdy Sandhu, Sahil Khattar, Ammy Virk, Adinath Kothare, Dhairya Karwa and R. Badree.

Vishnu Vardhan Induri who first owned the rights for the film and Madhu Mantena, the co-producer in Phantom Films, formally met the Indian squad of 1983 during mid-July 2016, and its frontman Kapil Dev, where they signed a Memorandum of understanding (MoU) to make the official biopic. In September 2017, Reliance Entertainment co-financed the project and officially announced the biopic with members of the winning team, with Singh and Khan brought on board. Following an extensive casting and pre-production process, the film began principal photography on 5 June 2019, where it was majorly shot in and around England for three months and a brief schedule took place in India, before filming being wrapped up on 7 October.

Originally scheduled for a theatrical release in April 2020, the film was delayed several times due to the casting and pre-production works that delayed filming, and also due to the COVID-19 pandemic in India, resulting in the film being delayed until December 2021. It premiered at the Red Sea International Film Festival on 15 December and released worldwide on 24 December 2021 (Christmas Eve) in conventional 2D and 3D formats, distributed by PVR Pictures in Tamil, Telugu, Malayalam and Kannada languages, apart from the original version. The film received widespread acclaim from critics and audiences alike, praising the performances of the cast, screenplay, direction and technical aspects. However, the film was unsuccessful at the Indian box office, although it became the highest grossing Hindi film of 2021 overseas.

At the 67th Filmfare Awards, 83 received 14 nominations, including Best Director (Khan), Best Supporting Actor (Tripathi) and Best Male Playback Singer (Arijit Singh for "Lehra Do"), and won two awards – Best Actor (Ranveer Singh) and Best Lyricist (Munir for "Lehra Do").

== Plot ==
In 1983, the Board of Control for Cricket in India receives an official invitation for the Indian national cricket team to participate in the Prudential Cricket World Cup in England. Upon arriving in London, the under-rated Indian team witnesses the media and paparazzi swarming the West Indies squad. Despite substandard performance in their warm-up matches and skepticism from the international press, Indian captain Kapil Dev confidently declares that victory is their goal. At a reception hosted at Buckingham Palace, Queen Elizabeth II wishes the participating teams good luck, and Dev rallies his teammates in his developing English.

Placed in Group B alongside teams from Australia, the West Indies, and Zimbabwe, India begins their campaign on a surprisingly high note. They unexpectedly win against two-time champions West Indies at Old Trafford, driven by Yashpal Sharma's Player of the Match performance of 89 runs. India next defeats Zimbabwe at Grace Road, thanks to a half-century from Sandeep Patil and crucial bowling from Madan Lal. However, the team suffers a heavy loss to Australia when key batsman Sunil Gavaskar is sidelined with a leg injury.

The team faces another defeat in their rematch against the West Indies, as Viv Richards scores an impressive 119 runs, while Malcolm Marshall's hostile bouncer attack injures Dilip Vengsarkar's chin, requiring seven stitches and sidelining him for the rest of the tournament. Despite Mohinder "Jimmy" Amarnath's valiant 80 runs, India loses by 66 runs. Initially discouraged, the players are reinspired after spotting a young boy waving the Indian national flag while celebrating West Indies fans temporarily block their team bus.

On June 18, India faces Zimbabwe at Nevill Ground in a high-stakes sudden-death match. With Gavaskar returning to the side and the players' wives in attendance, India's innings opens disastrously, collapsing to 9 runs for 4 wickets. After lunch, Dev uses the Mongoose bat and hits boundaries. Mid-innings, Dev is momentarily confused by a standing ovation for a single run, only for the umpire to inform him that he has broken the world record for the highest individual ODI score, finishing 175, the first-ever ODI century scored by an Indian. India wins by 31 runs, sustaining their campaign. At a subsequent High Commissioner's party, Krishnamachari Srikkanth jests that while everyone initially thought Kapil was crazy for aiming to defeat the West Indies, the team will now aim towards lifting the World Cup trophy.

India advances to the semi-finals by defeating Australia by 118 runs at Chelmsford, with Roger Binny named Player of the Match. Meanwhile, in India, Prime Minister Indira Gandhi orders nationwide expansion of television broadcasting infrastructure so citizens can watch the semi-finals against hosts England. In the match, England is bowled out for 213, aided by Kirti Azad's crucial wicket of Ian Botham and resilient bowling from Balwinder Sandhu, who overcomes a breakup from his fiancée. During the run chase, Amarnath, Yashpal, Patil, and Dev carry the team forward, with Patil striking a four to seal their place in the final. Amarnath is awarded Player of the Match.

On June 25, India faces the West Indies in the final at Lord's. Gavaskar is dismissed for 2 and Srikkanth makes 38, leaving India all out for a modest 183, the lowest total defended in a World Cup final. During the break, a determined Dev rallies his team to defend every run.

In the second innings, Sandhu provides an early breakthrough by bowling Gordon Greenidge. Viv Richards launches a fierce assault, hitting rapid boundaries off Madan Lal. However, Madan Lal convinces Dev to give him another over; consequently, Richards hits a high mistimed shot that Dev catches after a sensational backward running effort. The West Indies batting order rapidly collapses. With the West Indies nine wickets down, Amarnath bowls to tailender Michael Holding, trapping him LBW. Following a loud appeal, the umpire raises his finger, declaring India's victory by 43 runs.

Ecstatic fans immediately swarm the field as the team rushes back to the dressing room. In Mumbai, a young Sachin Tendulkar watches the televised victory, inspired to one day play cricket for India. Amarnath is named Player of the Match for his all-round performance, and Dev steps onto the Lord's balcony to hoist the World Cup trophy.

== Cast ==
- Ranveer Singh as Kapil "Kuku" Dev a.k.a. "Kaps": The captain of the Indian Cricket Team at the 1983 Cricket World Cup
    - Dev also appears himself briefly in a scene as an Indian spectator catching a ball
- Deepika Padukone as Romi Bhatia Dev, Kapil's wife
- Pankaj Tripathi as P. R. Man Singh: Manager of the Indian Cricket Team at the 1983 World Cup
- Tahir Raj Bhasin as Sunil "Sunny" Gavaskar a.k.a. "Little Master"
- Jiiva as Krishnamachari Srikkanth aka "Cheeka"
- Saqib Saleem as Mohinder "Jimmy" Amarnath aka "Jim Pa"
- Jatin Sarna as Yashpal "Yash" Sharma
- Chirag Patil as Sandeep "Sandy" Patil aka "Patla"
- Dinker Sharma as Kirti Azad
- Nishant Dahiya as Roger Binny
- Harrdy Sandhu as Madan Lal aka "Madi Pa"
- Sahil Khattar as Syed Kirmani a.k.a. "Kiri"
- Ammy Virk as Balwinder "Ballu" Singh Sandhu
- Adinath Kothare as Dilip Vengsarkar a.k.a. "Colonel"
- Dhairya Karwa as Ravi Shastri
- R Badree as Sunil Valson alias "Vally"
- Neena Gupta as Rajkumari Nikhanj, Kapil's mother
- Boman Irani as Farokh Engineer
- Rajeev Gupta as Journalist Mishra
- Aditi Arya as Inderjit Bhardwaj, Jimmy's wife
- Samreen Kaur as Simran Singh, Ballu's fiancée
- Satish Alekar as S. K. Wankhede
- Wamiqa Gabbi as Annu Lal, Madan's wife
- Parvati Nair as Marshneil Gavaskar, Sunil's wife
- Mohinder Amarnath as Lala Amarnath, Jimmy's father
- Avantika Akerkar as Indira Gandhi
- Rukhsar Rehman as Salma Sultan
- Ashok Banthia as Rajiv Khanna
- Chandramouli Kalyanachakravarthy as Mr. Natarajan
- Rajie Vijay Sarathy as Mrs. Natarajan
- Swetha Vinod as Kalyani Natarajan
- Anjum Batra as Kulwant Singh Toor
- Akshay Kumar Jinagal as Vijay
- Quin Huntley as Imran Khan
- Happy Sharma as Gill
- Jacques Taylor as Viv Richards
- Carl Greenidge as Gordon Greenidge
- Tagenarine Chanderpaul as Larry Gomes
- Jason Clive Lloyd as Joel Garner a.k.a. "Big Bird"
- Baharul Islam as the Major of Indian Army
- Orson Nurse as Clive Lloyd
- Foozi Artan as Wayne Daniel
- Sebastian Burchell as Dave Richardson
- Mali Marshall as Malcolm Marshall
- Sheryl Bennett as Vidya Srikkanth, Chika's wife
- Neil Durand as Kevin Curran
- Duncan Fletcher the spectator with a beer glass in his hand when Kapil Dev takes a running catch of Amarnath's bowling in India vs Zimbabwe match

== Production ==
=== Origin ===
A film based on the 1983 Cricket World Cup and India's win at the tournament was first ideated by Vishnu Vardhan Induri the founder and managing director of Celebrity Cricket League in 2014 and he approached Kapil Dev with the Idea initially. In mid-July 2016, Phantom Studios — a joint production company owned by Madhu Mantena, featuring the collaborations of directors Anurag Kashyap, Vikas Bahl and Vikramaditya Motwane also expressed their interest in co-producing the film, citing their passion for cricket. 83 is touted to be the first venture of Vishnu Vardhan Induri's newly formed production house, Vibri Media. The squad members of the 1983 team, along with former Indian cricketer Kapil Dev met the producers at a suburban hotel in Mumbai, discussing about the film. In the process, the two production companies had signed a Memorandum of understanding (MoU) with the 1983 team to make an official biopic, where according to the norms, the producers will get to use the actual names of the players as well as use real incidents from their lives. In an official statement regarding the biopic, Dev stated that "the journey of the 1983 team is a story of inspiration which proves that one can achieve anything if they aim for it and work for it no matter what the world thinks".

=== Development ===
Despite the official announcement, the makers were yet to finalise the cast and crew members and the director of the project. Rumours surfaced that Kabir Khan was going to direct the project with either Ranveer Singh, Arjun Kapoor or Sushant Singh Rajput playing the role of Kapil Dev. When Khan was asked about his role in the biopic, he stated that "he was fascinated on the story of India's journey at the 1983 Cricket World Cup" but remained silent on the claims of directing the film. Akshay Kumar was also rumoured to act in the film, which was later declined. On 25 September 2017, Phantom Films announced that Singh would play the role of Kapil Dev, and Kabir Khan too confirmed that he will direct the film.

As a young schoolboy when I watched India win the 1983 Cricket World Cup. I had no idea that from that day onwards cricket in India will change forever. As a filmmaker, for me, the journey to that win, filled with raw energy and sheer passion of that young Indian team, is probably one of the most exciting stories I have worked on.

— Kabir Khan, on directing the film

A launch event was hosted at JW Marriott Mumbai on 27 September 2017 by Reliance Entertainment and Vibri Media to announce the biopic officially under the title 83. Singh and the entire former team that won the Cricket World Cup in 1983 were present at the event. Speaking at the event, Khan said that the makers will begin pre-production and location scouting by late-November 2017, and has planned to shoot the film in real locations, in order to create authenticity and also "to give youngsters to celebrate the milestone in the history of Indian Cricket which happened when many were not even born".

This film was considered to be one of the last productions of Phantom Films, the other being Super 30 (2019) and Ghoomketu (2020). The company dissolved in October 2018 after its response to a sexual assault allegation on Bahl by a former women employee of the company, and its collaborators later moved to work on independent projects. Bahl was ousted from the project. In May 2019, Sajid Nadiadwala joined the film as one of the co-producers.

=== Casting ===
The casting and pre-production works were delayed extensively as Kabir Khan wanted "a cast that authenticates the 1983 Indian squad". Initially, Vicky Kaushal was rumoured to play a prominent role in the film, but Kaushal denied Khan's offer due to his commitments in Uri: The Surgical Strike (2019). Similarly, Telugu actor's Allu Arjun and Vijay Deverakonda too were considered to play the role of Krishnamachari Srikkanth, both declining the offer. Later, Tamil actor Jiiva was signed to reprise Srikkanth, marking his Hindi debut. His inclusion was officially confirmed on late-January 2019. On 23 January, Punjabi actor-singer Ammy Virk was signed to play the role of Balwinder Sandhu. The makers further cast Tahir Raj Bhasin and ex-cricketer and singer Harrdy Sandhu, to play the roles of Sunil Gavaskar and Madan Lal respectively. Chirag Patil, son of former cricketer and a member of 1983 Indian cricket squad, Sandeep Patil reprised his father's role for the film, thereby making his acting debut.

The casting process continued till mid-February 2019, with Saqib Saleem playing the role of Mohinder Amarnath, and Dhairya Karwa was assigned to reprise Ravi Shastri. Pankaj Tripathi roped in to play PR Man Singh, former cricketer, who managed the Indian Cricket Team playing for 1983 World Cup. Vijay Varma was initially reported to play Roger Binny, but the role went to Nishant Dahiya. Amiya Dev, Kapil Dev's daughter joined as an assistant director to Kabir Khan. R. Badree, who acted in Khan's web-series The Forgotten Army, assigned to play the role of Sunil Valson. In mid-April 2019, Adinath Kothare was assigned to play Dilip Vengsarkar, and Jatin Sarna was signed in to play Yashpal Sharma. Mali Marshall was cast to play his father and West Indies fast bowler Malcolm Marshall. In May 2019, Pritam was announced as the music director, and in June, Deepika Padukone joined the cast as Kapil Dev's wife, Romi Bhatia, while also co-producing the film. While Katrina Kaif was initially rumoured to play the role, Khan stated that she was never in talks for the film.

=== Pre-production ===
Singh began preparing for the role during mid-August 2018, and learnt lessons from former professional cricketer Sachin Tendulkar. Khan also joined the team at the Lord's Cricket Stadium in St John's Wood, London where he began pre-production works on the film. He also trained under the guidance of Kapil Dev, to fit for his role in the film. When the final cast being announced, former cricketer-politician Kirti Azad gave to Khan on how they enact the former cricketers on-screen. He further gave inputs on his former teammates nature and mannerisms. In March 2019, the team underwent practice sessions at Mumbai for three hours, starting from 7:00–10:00 am, while Singh prepared for an extra hour. The training sessions consisted of physical, skill training and establishing different styles. A source from The Indian Express said that "Ranveer practiced for about 2 hours every alternate day with Balwinder Singh Sandhu. Post that, they discuss the mindset of the 1983 team during the tournament and dissect Kapil Dev's captaincy that Balwinder saw from close quarters." Then, in April 2019, the cast trained at cricket with former cricketers Balwinder Sandhu and Yashpal Sharma, at a camp at Dharamshala Cricket Stadium for 10 days. He was further trained with Kapil Dev at Delhi in May 2019, closer to the start of the film's shoot, and also attended practice sessions at Lord's in June 2019.

=== Filming ===
Khan announced that the filming would start in London and will be extensively shot there for three months, starting from May 2019. The entire cast flew to London on 28 May to become part of the shooting schedule. Principal photography began on 5 June at Glasgow, Scotland where filming took place for one week. Padukone joined film team in Glasgow for her part of shooting. On 25 June 2019, celebrating the anniversary of India's win at the 1983 Cricket World Cup, Khan stated about the shooting of the climax scene, which was the finals, saying that, the shooting will begin after 2019 Cricket World Cup tournament (14 July 2019). Filming also took place at the Nevill Ground, Royal Tunbridge Wells. On 4 July, Pankaj Tripathi stated that he wrapped the shooting of the film.

On 17 July, post the 2019 World Cup Final, the team began preparation for shooting for the climax scene with Chirag Patil, sharing behind-the-scenes video from the practice sessions. The team went to Lord's stadium in late-August to shoot the climax scene for five days, and after its completion, the team wrapped the three-month filming schedule in London on 1 September 2019. The team returned to India, to shoot few sequences for the film at Mumbai. On 10 September 2019, the team kickstarted the second and final schedule of the film. Padukone finished her portion of shooting in mid-September. The filming was completed on 7 October 2019.

== Music ==
The film's soundtrack is composed by Pritam, who worked with Kabir Khan's previous films including New York (2009), Bajrangi Bhaijaan, Phantom (2015) and Tubelight (2017). The film score is composed by Julius Packiam. Pritam began composing for the film's soundtrack during mid-2019, and complete within mid-2021. The original soundtrack featured 14 compositions, with six original tunes, five alternatives and three instrumentals. Lyrics for the songs are written by Kausar Munir, Jaideep Sahni, Prashant Ingole and Ashish Pandit, and vocals were provided by Arijit Singh, Benny Dayal, Tushar Joshi, Krishnakumar Kunnath, Amit Mishra, Papon and Raghav Chaitanya. The songs — "Lehra Do" and "Bigadne Do" — were released as lead singles from the album on 6 and 13 December 2021 respectively. The full soundtrack album was released on 23 December by Zee Music Company label, a day prior to the film's release.

== Marketing ==
Prior to the shooting of the film, in October 2017, Singh, Khan and Phantom Films signed a contract with Bartle Bogle Hegarty (BBH), a British-based creative agency, for bring branded entertainment and strategic partnerships. On 6 July 2019, coinciding Singh's birthday, he released a still from the film, featuring him transforming as Kapil Dev. His look received praise from fans and celebrities alike. On 10 January 2020, the promotions for the film kickstarted with the first title logo being launched. The character posters from the film were launched starting from 11 January. On 25 January 2020, the cast and crew members along with the former 1983 Indian cricket team attended a special event held at Sathyam Cinemas, Chennai to launch the first look from the film, with Kamal Haasan as the chief guest. The official trailer of the film released on 30 November 2021, which coincided with the launch event in Mumbai. The trailer was attached with the prints of Tadap.

The makers collaborated with several brands to promote the film including, Mobil, Aqua Pura Mountain Water, Fevicol, Carrera Eyewear, Tide, KromaColor, Nestlé, Rupa Company, Finolex and Toothsi. A source from Reliance Entertainment, stated that "83 is one of the major films that has roped in multiple brands, in the post-pandemic era. We have roped in close to 35 brands for the perimeter branding, in-film associations, and out-of-film placement. These brand tie-ups are a good strategy for us to garner more media and also it helps the film to reach more audiences and territories." It has been reported that the cost of out-of-film and in-film branding is estimated to be ₹20 lakh (US$21,000) to ₹1 crore (US$100,000). Even before the theatrical release, in March 2021, Singh and Kabir Khan, in collaboration with Indian tennis sportsperson, Mahesh Bhupathi launched a merchandise brand based on the film named as 83 Believe. The brand is reportedly valued around ₹20 crore (US$2.1 million), becoming the widest consumer product range launched by any film-based property in India.

The film's team launched stills and trailer of the film at Burj Khalifa in Dubai, as a part of the promotions. On 23 December, the team further launched collectibles based on the film through non-fungible tokens (NFT) — which includes autographed physical cricket memorabilia, video scenes, animated digital avatars, and unseen posters and images from the film. The film's producers partnered with NFT Labs, and Social Swag, an influencer-led fan engagement platform for the launch of NFTs. Prithviraj Sukumaran, the distributor of the film's Malayalam version promoted the film, by enacting as an interviewer to Ranveer Singh, sharing his experiences about the film. Sudeep further announced that the glimpse of his film, Vikrant Rona will be attached to the prints of 83, where the film's Kannada version will be screened across 500 cinema theatres in Karnataka. Amul India released a doodle based on the film, as a part of the promotions.

== Release ==
=== Theatrical ===
In November 2017, Reliance Entertainment announced that the film would be theatrically released on 5 April 2019. However, due to the extensive pre-production works which further delaying the film's shooting process, the makers postponed the release to 30 August, and to 10 April 2020. Following the closure of theatres in mid-March 2020, in order to control the COVID-19 pandemic in India, the film's release was withheld. On late-June 2020, trade analyst Taran Adarsh reported that 83 will release on the occasion of Christmas (25 December 2020). Shibashish Sarkar, executive producer and CEO of Reliance Entertainment, reinstated the plans of theatrical release despite rumours of a direct-streaming release, while Kabir Khan also said that "the film has been envisioned and made to be experienced on the big screen and we are ready to wait for things to get normal and then release it in cinemas".

However, in November 2020, Reliance Entertainment announced that the release had been postponed to the first quarter of 2021 (January–March), due to the worst occupancy report of audience towards theatres due to continuity of the pandemic. Also, the lack of time to plan a promotional campaign and shutting down of international markets were attributed as the factors for the delay. In mid-February 2021, following the government's permission to have a 100% seating occupancy in theatres, the producers planned for theatrical release on 4 June 2021. But, in late-May 2021, the film was postponed indefinitely, due to the closure of theatres in Maharashtra in concern over the Delta variant of COVID-19. In September 2021, after the Maharashtra government permitted to resume theatrical-based operations by 22 October 2021, the film was planned for a release on 24 December 2021, which coincided with Christmas Eve. Its release semi-clashed with that of the Hollywood film The Matrix Resurrections (2021), which released across the world, two days earlier.

=== Screenings ===
It was announced that the film would exclusively premiere at the Red Sea International Film Festival in Jeddah, Saudi Arabia (6–15 December 2021). The film was showcased at the closing day of the festival and was received a standing ovation from the audience. A special screening of the film was held at Delhi on 22 December. Along with the entire cast of 83, and the original 1983 Indian team squad, the premiere saw the attendance of numerous celebrities from the film fraternity including Ananya Pandey, Sara Ali Khan, Ayan Mukerji, Arjun Kapoor, Vaani Kapoor, Nora Fatehi, Ayushmann Khurrana, Malavika Mohanan, Pooja Hegde, Suniel Shetty, Richa Chadha, Rohit Shetty and Janhvi Kapoor amongst others. Sajid Nadiadwala, showcased another premiere show for the film in Delhi to political personalities, including Anurag Thakur, Union Minister for Information and Broadcasting and Sports and Youth Affairs, Piyush Goyal, Minister for Commerce and Industry, Textiles and Consumer Affairs and 10 MPs and MLAs. The film was later given tax free in Delhi.

=== Statistics ===
83 was released in over an estimated 4,000–5,000 screens across the world, which is considered to be the "biggest release in India in the post-pandemic era", according to trade analysts Taran Adarsh and Girish Johar. It was released in 2D and 3D formats. The makers planned to release the film in IMAX formats in order to give "a larger-than-life experience for a sports film". However, the plan was dropped after the IMAX officials in North America declined their approval, in concern of the Hollywood big-budget releases such as Spider-Man: No Way Home and The Matrix Resurrections; the management did not encourage the release of too many IMAX films in the same period.

The film released in over 3,741 screens across India, with the Hindi version being played 3,374 screens at 1,727 theatres. The dubbed versions of the film were released over 367 screens in India, with the Telugu version played on 137 screens, Tamil version on 184 screens, Malayalam version on 13 screens and the Kannada version on 33 screens. The film was screened in over 1,512 screens in 80 countries, which is considered to be the "widest opening in overseas centres". The film was screened at 44 theatres in Saudi Arabia, thereby being the biggest release in that country. It was the first Indian film to be released in Cambodia. It was also screened at the PictureTime Digiplex mobile theatre in Ladakh, which is located at the highest attitude of 11,562 feet (3,524 metres). On the day of the opening release, Gaiety Galaxy and Maratha Mandir theatre removed the screening of the film due to revenue-sharing issues, with the distributor.

=== Controversies ===
Prior to the film's theatrical premiere, a UAE-based finance company, Future Resource FZE, has sought issuance of process against the producers on grounds of alleged conspiracy and cheating. The company further approached the Andheri Metropolitan Magistrate Court in Mumbai to issue a complaint regarding the same. They claimed that the makers of 83 had allegedly committed offences under Sections 405, 406 (criminal breach of trust), 415, 418, 420 (cheating) and 120B (criminal conspiracy) of the Indian Penal Code. The spokesperson of one of the producers, Vishnu Induri had issued a statement regarding the same and said: "In the wake of the ongoing reports of a legal case filed against the makers of the upcoming film 83, on behalf of Vibri Media, we would like to deny the claims of the complainant and clarify the makers of 83 are in no way concerned with the case. The complaint of Future Resources FZE against the producers of the film 83 is false, baseless and motivated." A scene in which the Pakistan Army stopped border firing to let the Indian Army listen to the score of the final match, received criticism from fans, whom accused Khan for his propaganda towards Pakistan, though Singh claimed that the scene is "one of the special moments that Pakistanis would love" in his interview to the journalists in Dubai.

=== Worldwide distribution ===
The film was distributed worldwide through PVR Pictures. On 23 January 2020, actors Kamal Haasan and Nagarjuna Akkineni announced that they will present the Tamil and Telugu versions of the film, under their Raaj Kamal Films International and Annapurna Studios banners, with the rights for the distribution were acquired by YNOT X and Global Cinemas, respectively. In November 2021, Prithviraj Sukumaran roped in to present the film's Malayalam-dubbed version under his Prithviraj Productions banner, which will be distributed by E4 Entertainment. Actor Sudeep presented the Kannada version of the film through his Kichcha Creations and its distributor Shalini Arts. The overseas theatrical rights are with Phars Film LLP.

=== Home media and streaming services ===
The streaming rights were purchased by Netflix and Disney+ Hotstar, for ₹30 crore and Star India network acquired the broadcasting rights for the film in all languages. The producers announced that the film will be streamed on the digital platforms only after eight weeks of its theatrical run. But, it was later called off as the production team decided to broadcast the film first over streaming release in order to connect with the "nostalgic factor of an entire generation – an audience group which primarily is found on the medium of television". As a result, the film was premiered first on Star Gold on 20 March 2022, and later released through digital platforms, the following day.

== Reception ==
=== Critical response ===
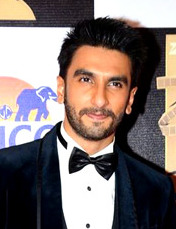
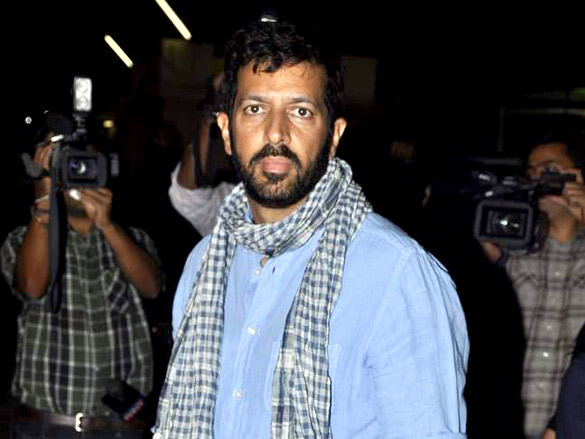
Ranveer Singh received acclaim from critics for his portrayal of Kapil Dev in the film, while Kabir Khan was praised for his direction.

On the review aggregator website Rotten Tomatoes, 80% of 15 critics' reviews are positive, with an average rating of 7.6/10. 83 received critical acclaim. Taran Adarsh from Bollywood Hungama gave 4 stars (out of 5), saying that "83 is a winner on pitch and on-screen too". He further wrote "Those who witnessed the victory would be glad to relive the experience, while those who didn't, will get a chance to witness how things unfolded during one of the greatest episodes of Indian sports history". Rachana Dubey of The Times of India too gave four out of five stars, stating that "You realise this film is not about winning on a world stage, it's about earning respect and director Kabir Khan does set a high benchmark for himself, once again". She also praised Ranveer Singh's performance for enacting Kapil Dev, and further concluded "83 does play on the nationalism rhetoric, way more than was required. At the surface, '83' is about an underdog team's win. As you go deeper, with each actor effortlessly presenting himself as an iconic cricketer from the 1983 team, you tend to feel that this picture has been crafted with a skillfully written narrative, supported by nuanced and internalised performances, and each department lending its technical brilliance to it." Anuj Kumar of The Hindu reviewed that "The film not only captures the emotional heft of the success story of the underdogs, but also delivers a well-researched document in the popular idiom".

Pooja Biraia Jaiswal of The Week gave four-and-a-half out of five stars saying "The film is a compelling watch and you don't want to miss a single frame as every minute is accounted for". She added, "The profound feeling of a nation's victory; an underdog's unimaginable success and the emotional high of achieving the world's greatest title is something that the film has managed to bring out", further praising Singh's performance and Khan's direction. Shubhra Gupta of The Indian Express gave three-and-a-half out of five, stating "Kabir Khan's '83 recreates the day of 1983 Cricket World Cup Final with fidelity, and, yes, let it be said, in full Bollywood style, suffused with song, dance, drama, colour. It pads the film with a few (fictional) elements meant strictly to play to the gallery, and it skates dangerously close to pandering to the overbearing nationalistic sentiments playing out in today's India." Monika Rawal Kukreja of Hindustan Times wrote that "Making a film based on such a historic milestone was quite a risky proposition for director Kabir Khan because you can't afford to go wrong with facts here. But the minute details and nuances in the story that he highlights in the film makes you believe in his research and dedication towards the project [...] At several places, 83 gets high on nationalism, which couldn't been easily avoided. But that's something one kind of overlooks for the pride and joy you experience on seeing the team lift that trophy. If you needed a reason to walk into a theatre, 83 is that film which calls for a big screen experience."

Arnab Banerjee of Outlook gave four out of five, writing that "The film is a breezy entertainer fast-forwarded with deft editing and unemotional tracks." Anna M. M. Vetticad of Firstpost gave three-and-a-half out of five saying "83 is a stirring reminder of a time when pride in a national team's achievement united India and national pride had not yet been weaponised by the mob [...] It works nevertheless because it is a celebration, it understands the difference between opponents and enemies, and because of its cast. Each one not only looks like an actual player on the sporting field, but they imbue their respective characters with a believability that is particularly noteworthy because acted scenes are interspersed in places with actual matches yet the difference between the real cricketers and the actors playing them is not jarring." Saibal Chatterjee in his review for NDTV, gave four stars and stated that "83 comes pretty close to achieving the impossible. No mean feat that. The film and its principal star go for broke and, as one feeds off the other, the result is an absolute cracker." Uday Bhatia of Mint stated "Kabir Khan's film underlines everything but gets cricket right, is overwrought but joyful".

Sneha Behangani of CNBC TV18 stated "83 also plays masterfully with nostalgia and trivia. Khan ensures that he treats cricket lovers to little surprises (including but not limited to guest appurtenances and real footage) strewn carefully throughout the film." Stutee Ghosh of The Quint gave four out of five, stating "83 is a competently made ode to the game of cricket and the team that made all Indians feel like champions. In its review for The Guardian, Phil Hoad gave four out of five and said "83 doesn't delve any further than that into what degree sporting victory ever translates to social and political progress. But it is an endearing sports film with just enough awareness of where it stands, now that Britain's imperial legacy is being questioned more than ever, on a larger field." Nandini Ramanath of Scroll.in said "Khan's fan tribute to a can-do and did-do spirit revivifies the black-and-white photographs, grainy footage and memories embedded in the memories of generations of Indians [...] Ranveer Singh's Kapil Dev is the man of this series for all practical purposes. Singh deftly underplays the heroics and coolly leads the ensemble cast out of the doghouse and into the big league." Sukanya Verma of Rediff.com gave 4 stars (out of 5) saying "Kabir Khan's '83 is an ode to a game changing chapter of Indian cricket history, pitch-perfect partnerships between openers and tail enders, knowing your mate's strengths as well as your own, the everlasting tradition of superstitions and sledging and seizing that one moment that defines the rest of your life." A critic from BBC wrote "Kabir Khan relies on well-known anecdotes to build a narrative. The film is loaded with clichés and the signature touches of his earlier films. But such is the sweet flavour of that singular victory, so thrilling the drama, that it shouldn't fail to gratify the viewer."

The members of the 1983 squad, Sunil Gavaskar, Ravi Shastri and Madan Lal praised the team after watching the premiere of the film. Gavaskar said that "It is simply brilliant and the way every actor has got the mannerisms, the walk, the look, the style of every player was unbelievably uncanny. Full marks to Kabir Khan and his team for their efforts." While Shastri said that "I was left teary-eyed while watching the movie, not because I was part of the team that won it. I really had tears in my eyes when the film got over, because it brought back so many memories" and appreciated Kabir Khan for the direction. Madan Lal stated "83 a must-watch, on the big screen". Several publications listed 83 as one of the best Bollywood films of 2021, which includes: The Indian Express (Shubhra Gupta and Minnasa Shekhar), Film Companion (Anupama Chopra), Hindustan Times (Devarsi Ghosh), The Hindu (Anuj Kumar), India Today (Anandita Mukherjee) and Firstpost (Subhash K. Jha).

=== Box office ===
According to Box Office India, the film is the second-highest grossing Hindi opener of 2021, collecting about ₹12.64 crore (US$1.3 million), the first being Sooryavanshi, which collected ₹26.29 crore (US$2.7 million). By the second day of the release, the film had earned ₹25.73 crore (US$2.7 million), and had earned about ₹30.91 crore (US$3.2 million) in the third day of its release, thereby earning about ₹83 crore (US$8.6 million) in the opening weekend. Its collections, however saw a downward trend after first three days of its release, due to the heavy competition with Pushpa: The Rise and Spider-Man: No Way Home, the rise of COVID-19 cases due to the Omicron variant, and the sudden restrictions imposed by the state governments, which included night curfew in Maharashtra and the closure of theatres in Delhi from 28 December 2021, as per the orders of Delhi government to control the pandemic. This had impacted the collections of the film, as these territories significantly contribute to the Hindi film box office. Experts further analysed that the postponement of other films which included Jersey, RRR, Radhe Shyam and Samrat Prithviraj, is a minimal hope for the film, so that the film might have a good run at the box-office.

The film crossed the 100-crore mark on the sixth day of its release, earning about ₹106.03 crore (US$11 million) by 29 December 2021. By the first week, the worldwide box-office collection is estimated to be around ₹135 crore (US$14 million). Within ten days of its release, the film managed to earn around ₹146.54 crore (US$15 million). It was considered to be a box-office disappointment considering the higher production costs involved. As of 10 March 2022, the film grossed ₹129.79 crore in India and ₹63.94 crore overseas, for a worldwide gross collection of ₹193.73 crore.

==== Pre sale records ====
The advance bookings of the film began on 19 December 2021, five days prior to the release. Despite a middling response, national multiplex chains reported that the film sold nearly 1 lakh tickets with a gross of ₹3.5 crore (US$360,000). PVR reported that 46,000 tickets have sold for the opening day, while INOX and Cinépolis had sold 54,000 tickets. The film's cumulative advance ticket sales were reportedly less than that of Gully Boy (2019) which sold 2.12 lakh tickets in advance for the first day of the release. Trade analysts Taran Adarsh and Girish Johar predicted that "the film's opening day collections will be in the range of ₹12–15 crore (US$1.6–2.0 million), if the film gets positive word-of-mouth". They also opined that "The success of Pushpa: The Rise and Spider-Man: No Way Home released in theatres, a week prior, also followed by the threat of Omicron variant, and the occupancy restrictions prevailing in Maharashtra, might affect the collections. However, the film has generated positive buzz among the audience, with its trailer and people will come to watch the film, if it is worth their while."

Film critic and trade journalist Komal Nahta, stated about the early predictions of the opening day box-office. He watched the screening of the film in Mumbai and reviewed that "83 has everything that the audience wants in a film — there's the thrill, excitement, fun, light drama, melodrama and emotions and to top it all, there are a lot of things of patriotism. The feeling for the motherland is so high that your chest swells with pride. The whole thrill of the game, feeling of patriotism, and Ranveer's Singh's performance are the major aspects that would translate into great box office numbers." In Mumbai and Bangalore, the film generated 40–45% occupancy on the opening day, while in Hyderabad, more than 50% shows were booked for the film. More than 20–25% shows were booked in advance in the Delhi–NCR regions, whereas about 30–35% shows were booked in Chennai and Pune. The film had an average 10–15% occupancy reported in Chandigarh, and 10% in Kolkata, while, it had a poor advance booking sale in Ahmedabad, with occupancy ranging from 8–10%.

==== India ====
In its opening day, the film earned ₹12.64 crore (US$1.3 million) at the box-office, (Note: The Indian Express and Hindustan Times estimated the opening day collections to be around ₹13–14 crore (US$1.7–1.9 million).) while trade analyst Taran Adarsh of Bollywood Hungama had estimated that it collected ₹15.25 crore (US$1.6 million). The film had an excellent opening at metropolitan cities including Delhi and Mumbai, with a strong hold in multiplexes, but saw a below average performance in single screens. The dubbed versions of the film (Tamil, Telugu, Malayalam and Kannada) had collected ₹1.5 crore (US$160,000) approximately. On the second day of its release (25 December 2021), the film saw an increase of 30% compared to the first-day collection (owing to the Christmas holidays), as the film had earned ₹16 crore (US$1.7 million) worldwide. The two-day collections were reported to be around ₹29.59 crore (US$3.1 million), It further saw an increase on the third day (26 December), where the film had earned ₹17.41 crore (US$1.8 million). The collections in the first weekend were reported to be around ₹47 crore (US$4.9 million). The Tamil-dubbed version of the film had earned about ₹3 crore (US$310,000) in the opening weekend at Tamil Nadu.

The film saw a 40% drop, on the fourth day of its release (27 December), where it had collected ₹7.29 crore (US$760,000). It collections saw further decline after it earned ₹6.70 crore (US$700,000) on the fifth day. The Times of India reported that the film performed well at the Mumbai and Pune theatres in the opening week, but Gujarat and Saurashtra circuit barely contributed to the film's collections. By the first week of its release, the film had earned ₹71.87 crore (US$7.5 million) net collection at the domestic box-office, and a gross of ₹86.50 crore (US$9.0 million).

By entering the second week (31 December 2021), the film had collected ₹4.36 crore (US$450,000). However, on New Year's Day (1 January 2022), the film picked-up pace and had earned ₹7.73 crore (US$800,000) at the box-office, and on the eleventh day, the film collected about ₹7.31 crore (US$760,000). However, it slowed down on the third Monday, where it had collected around ₹2.01 crore (US$210,000). The dubbed versions of the film had accounted to ₹5.04 crore (US$520,000) until the second week of its release. The Telugu version earned about ₹1.1 crore (US$110,000) and the Tamil-dubbed version had collected ₹2.63 crore (US$270,000), and the Kannada and Malayalam versions earned ₹71 lakh (US$74,000) and ₹60 lakh (US$62,000) respectively. By the sixteenth-day of its release, the film collected about ₹100 crore (US$10 million) net collection in India, with a gross of ₹120.48 crore (US$13 million).

==== Other territories ====
On the overseas circuits, the film earned about US$1.57 million (₹11.79 crore), in the first day of its release. It surpassed the opening day collections of Sooryavanshi, which earned US$1.08 million (₹8.02 crore). The film also earned US$391,651 United Arab Emirates and US$90,843 from G.C.C territories, thereby collecting AED 1.77 million (US$482,494) from the regions. In the second day of its release, the film had collected US$1.01 million (₹7.6 crore), whereas in the third day, the film had collected US$900,000 (₹6.72 crore). By the fourth day of its release, the film collected US$680,000 (₹5.07 crore), totalling its estimated revenue about US$4.17 million (₹31.14 crore). It was considered to be the Singh's seventh highest-grosser at opening weekend in the overseas box-office, behind Goliyon Ki Raasleela Ram-Leela (2013), Dil Dhadakne Do, Bajirao Mastani (2015), Padmaavat, Simmba (2018) and Gully Boy (2019). It further grossed AED 3.46 million (US$941,983) in UAE and GCC.

By the end of the first week, the film earned around US$5.8 million (₹43 crore) and surpassed the opening week collections of Sooryavanshi at the overseas centres. In United States, the film earned around US$3,502,876 (₹26.01 crore), and at United Kingdom, the film had collected £445,160 (US$44.9 million). In the UAE and GCC territories, the film had collected AED 5.29 million (US$1,440,200). The film had collected about US$8,333 in Spain, NZD$229,103 (US$155,389.07) across New Zealand, MR 11,781 (US$2,799) in Malaysia, €52192 (US$59,295.33) in Germany, A$1,208,667 (US$868,112) in Australia. At the North American box-office, the film outperformed several Hollywood films including The Matrix Resurrections, The King's Man, West Side Story and American Dog. It was ranked in one among the top 10 films at the Australia, New Zealand and United Kingdom box office. Closer to the second weekend, the film had earned US$7.15 million (₹53.17 crore). The film eventually became one the highest-grossing Indian film of 2021 in overseas circuits with an adjusted collection of ₹62.54 crore (US$6.5 million) within 31 days.

=== Commercial analysis ===
In its article about Bollywood Hungama, Fenil Seta stated about the significant reasons, that led to its box-office decline, with problems regarding the technical aspects, casting and the storyline which did not connect with the youngsters apart from the aforementioned factors. Trade analyst Komal Nahta too considered that "One whole chunk of the audience — the 15 to 35 age group — didn't see the film. You can't ignore them if you make a film on such a huge budget. But, the youth doesn't believe in the past, and are not interested in historical facts. Their cricketing heroes are MS Dhoni and Virat Kohli. They couldn't identify with Kapil Dev and his team. 83 did not have much for the youth [...] If the film had a personalised and emotional storyline about the characters, it would have been successful in drawing the youth, like Sushant Singh Rajput's M.S. Dhoni: The Untold Story managed to do." Taran Adarsh also stated that "83 gives a feeling of a docu-drama. People who are looking for a masala entertainer will not find it there. Of course, looking at the subject, you can't have an item song or commercial ingredients, but that is one of the deterrents. But there are certain films that go down in history as wonderful ones, which might not have worked when they had been released." Analysts further believed that, the film was targeted towards the older audiences (the 35 to 50 age group), who were likely reluctant to go theatres, particularly with the rise in the Omicron variant, citing as the reason for the film's underpeformance.

According to Box Office India, the film sold less than 38 lakh tickets in the first week of its release, marginally lower than that of Shah Rukh Khan's Zero (2018), which sold 69 lakh tickets. Trade analysts reported that the film almost incurred a loss of ₹80 crore (US$8.3 million) to the makers, surpassing Bombay Velvet (2015), which incurred a ₹70 crore loss. Bollywood Hungama reported that the film's production costs were about ₹195 crore (US$20 million) with an additional ₹15 crore (US$1.6 million) being added for print and advertising costs, with interests due to delayed release being increased to ₹30 crore (US$3.1 million). While the overall expenditures were amounted to be ₹240 crore (US$25 million), the distributors' share from both domestic and overseas theatrical were reported to be about ₹53.87 crore (US$5.6 million) and ₹28.77 crore (US$3.0 million). It further recovered ₹105 crore (US$11 million) from non-theatrical revenues which includes satellite and digital rights for Hindi and regional languages and music rights. The production team received a subsidy of ₹30 crore (US$3.1 million) for shooting the film majorly in the United Kingdom. However, the total recovery was estimated to be ₹217.64 crore (US$23 million) from theatrical and non-theatrical revenue, resulting in a loss of ₹22.35 crore (US$2.3 million) to Reliance Entertainment with a negative 9.32% rate of ROI.
