= Sunil Valson =

Indian cricketer (born 1958)

Personal information
- Born: 2 October 1958 (age 68); Secunderabad, Andhra Pradesh, India
- Batting: Right-handed
- Bowling: Left-arm medium-fast

Domestic team information
- Years: Team
- 1977/78–1985/86: Delhi
- 1981/82: Tamil Nadu
- 1987/88: Railways
Medal record
Men's Cricket
Representing India
ICC Cricket World Cup
Winner	1983 England and Wales
- Source: CricketArchive, 20 January 2022

Sunil Valson (born 2 October 1958) is an Indian former cricketer who was selected for the 1983 Cricket World Cup but was the only player in the squad who did not play a single match. He represented the state Tamil Nadu in 1981–82. He performed extremely well in that season and got 26 wickets in 5 matches. This performance helped him get selected in the South Zone squad in the Duleep and Deodhar Trophy, he performed well in those tournaments. In the next season he decided to represent Delhi. He performed reasonably well, overall with the performance for Tamil Nadu and Delhi helping him to get the nod for the World Cup. He was the 12th man during the famous knock of 175 by Kapil Dev. Still, he did not get a chance to represent India. He later played for Railways and was part of the team that reached the 1987 Ranji Trophy Final. He played 75 first-class cricket matches between 1977 and 1988. Valson served as team manager of Delhi Capitals.

== In popular culture ==
R Badree portrayed Valson in 2021 film 83, a film based on India's World Cup win.
