= Asehi Ekada Vhave =

- Asehi Ekada Vhave Poster
- Directed by: Sushrut Bhagwat
- Story by: Sharvani Pillai; Sushrut Bhagwat
- Produced by: Madhukar Rahane; Ravindra Shingne
- Starring: Umesh Kamat; Tejashri Pradhan; Kavita Lad; Chirag Patil; Sharvani Pillai; Nikhil Rajeshirke; Narayan Jadhav
- Cinematography: Salil SahastrBuddhe
- Edited by: Rajesh Rao
- Music by: Avadhoot Gupte
- Production company: Zelu Entertainments Pvt. Ltd.
- Release date: 6 April 2018
- Country: India
- Language: Marathi

Asehi Ekada Vhave is a 2018 Indian Marathi language romance drama film directed by Sushrut Bhagwat, who also co-wrote the story with Sharvani Pillai. The film stars Umesh Kamat, Tejashri Pradhan, Kavita Lad, Chirag Patil and Sharvani Pillai in the lead roles. It also stars Dr. Nikhil Rajshirke, Ajit Bhure and Narayan Jadhav in supporting roles. It was released on 6 April 2018.

== Synopsis ==
A Love Story... a simple unconventional love story... story of operating ancestral business... A Story of ‘Siddharth’ (Umesh Kamat) and ‘Revati’ (Sharvani Pillai) fortifying their spice company to the next level...A Story of expressed and unexpressed relationship between ‘Kiran’ (Tejashri Pradhan) and ‘Kirit’ (Chirag Patil). A Story adorned of ‘Anirudha’ (Ajit Bhure) and ‘Renuka’ (Kavita Lad Medhekar) ... Story of camaraderie and reliance between ‘Tejas’ (Nikhil Rajeshirke) and ‘Siddharth’. A Story of brother – sister bond between ‘Siddharth’ and ‘Revati’.Story of Love, Commitment, Possessiveness, Possession, Companionship, Relations Film is about journey of affiliations.

== Cast ==
- Umesh Kamat as Siddharth Vaidya
- Tejashri Pradhan as Kiran Paranjape
- Kavita Lad as Renuka Paranjpe
- Chirag Patil as Kirit
- Sharvani Pillai as Revati Vaidya
- Ajit Bhure as Aniruddh Paranjpe
- Nikhil Rajeshirke as Tejas
- Narayan Jadhav

== Awards ==
- Maharashtra State Film Award for Best Female Playback Singer For Song "Savare Rang Main" - Savani Shende.
