= Madan Lal =

Indian cricket player (born 1951)

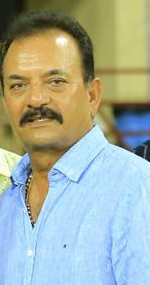

Personal information
- Full name: Madan Lal Udhouram Sharma
- Born: 20 March 1951 (age 75); Amritsar, Punjab, India
- Nickname: Maddi Paa, Maddat Lal
- Batting: Right-handed
- Bowling: Right-arm medium
- Role: All-rounder

International information
- National side: India
- Test debut (cap 130): 6 June 1974 v England
- Last Test: 19 June 1986 v England
- ODI debut (cap 5): 13 July 1974 v England
- Last ODI: 20 March 1987 v Pakistan

Domestic team information
- Years: Team
- 1968–1972: Punjab
- 1973–1991: Delhi

Head coaching information
- Years: Team
- 1996-97: India

Career statistics
Competition	Test	ODI	FC	LA
Matches	39	67	232	111
Runs scored	1,042	401	10,204	1,171
Batting average	22.65	19.09	42.87	25.45
100s/50s	0/5	0/1	22/50	0/5
Top score	74	53*	223	64
Balls bowled	5,997	3,164	33,123	5,456
Wickets	71	73	625	119
Bowling average	40.08	29.27	25.50	30.20
5 wickets in innings	4	0	27	0
10 wickets in match	0	0	5	0
Best bowling	5/23	4/20	9/31	4/20
Catches/stumpings	15/–	18/–	141/–	31/–
Medal record
Men's Cricket
Representing India
ICC Cricket World Cup
Winner	1983 England and Wales
ACC Asia Cup
Winner	1984 United Arab Emirates
- Source: ESPNcricinfo, 4 August 2014

Madan Lal Udhouram Sharma (born 20 March 1951) is a former Indian cricketer (1974–1987) and Indian national cricket coach. He was a member of the 1983 Cricket World Cup winning India squad. He was also a part of the Indian squad which won the 1985 World Championship of Cricket.

== Playing career ==
Madan Lal enjoyed outstanding all-round success at first-class level scoring 10,204 runs (av 42.87), including 22 hundreds, also capturing 625 wickets (av 25.50). He had a side-on bowling action.

He played 39 Test matches for India, scoring 1,042 runs at an average of 22.65, taking 71 wickets at 40.08 and holding 15 catches. He was a fairly competent lower order batsman, often extricating the Indian team from tricky situations which earned him the nickname, Maddad Lal by grateful Indian fans.

He made 67 One Day Internationals appearances and was also a member of the 1983 World Cup final winning team where he teamed up with Kapil Dev, Balwinder Sandhu, Roger Binny, Mohinder Amarnath and Kirti Azad to contain and destroy the opposition. In the 1983 world cup finale Kapil Dev took the extraordinary catch of Vivian Richards off the bowling of Madan Lal. Madan Lal played for Punjab but later played for Delhi. Madan Lal also bowled the first ball to Dennis Amiss of England in the 1975 World Cup

== Coaching career ==
In his retirement, Madan Lal has been actively involved in the game in various capacities. Madan Lal coached the UAE team for 1996 Cricket World Cup. Madan Lal had a stint as India's national cricket coach between September 1996 and September 1997

He was member of the Selection Committee from 2000 and 2001. He joined and served as the coach of the Delhi Giants (known as the Delhi Jets till 2008) in the Indian Cricket League till it became defunct. He later applied for BCCI's amnesty offer since the ICL was not a recognized Twenty20 League.

Madan Lal ran a cricket academy at the Siri Fort Sports Complex, Delhi. He was appointed as chief coach of the Sanjay Jagdale MPCA Academy in 2010.

== Political career ==
In March 2009, the Indian National Congress decided to field Madan Lal as their candidate for the Hamirpur Parliamentary constituency bye elections in Himachal Pradesh. Madan Lal was chosen to contest the bye elections against Anurag Thakur, son of the Himachal Pradesh BJP leader, Prem Kumar Dhumal.

== Acting career ==
In April 2013, Madan Lal appeared on a crime show called Hum Ne Li Hai- Shapath.

== In popular culture ==
A Bollywood film titled 83 was released in 2021 and is about the event of India's first world cup win at Lords. The film features Harrdy Sandhu as Madan Lal and is directed and produced by Kabir Khan and Anurag Kashyap respectively.

Preceded by Sandeep Patil	Indian National Cricket Coach (Manager); September 1996 – October 1997	Succeeded by Anshuman Gaekwad
Preceded by unknown	United Arab Emirates national cricket coach 1996	Succeeded by Abdul Razzaq Kazim
