= International cricket in 1975–76 =

International cricket season

The 1975–76 international cricket season was from September 1975 to April 1976.

== Season overview ==
International tours
Start date	Home team	Away team	Results [Matches]				
Start date	Home team	Away team	Test	ODI	FC	LA	Other
22 October 1975	Papua New Guinea	West Indies	—	—	—	—	0–2 [2]
28 November 1975	Australia	West Indies	5–1 [6]	1–0 [1]	—	—	—
24 January 1975	New Zealand	India	1–1 [3]	2–0 [2]	—	—	—
10 March 1976	West Indies	India	2–1 [4]	—	—	—	—

== October ==
=== West Indies in Papua New Guinea ===
Friendly series
Date	Home captain	Away captain	Venue	Result
22 October	Richard Unsworth	Clive Lloyd	Lae	West Indies by 6 wickets (25-over match)
23 October	George Wolstenhome	Clive Lloyd	Port Moresby	West Indies by 4 wickets (40-over match)

== November ==
=== West Indies in Australia ===
Test series
No.	Date	Home captain	Away captain	Venue	Result
Test 764	28 Nov–2 December	Greg Chappell	Clive Lloyd	The Gabba, Brisbane	Australia by 8 wickets
Test 765	12–16 December	Greg Chappell	Clive Lloyd	WACA Ground, Perth	West Indies by an innings and 87 runs
Test 766	26–30 December	Greg Chappell	Clive Lloyd	Melbourne Cricket Ground, Melbourne	Australia by 8 wickets
Test 767	3–7 January	Greg Chappell	Clive Lloyd	Sydney Cricket Ground, Sydney	Australia by 7 wickets
Test 768	23–28 January	Greg Chappell	Clive Lloyd	Adelaide Oval, Adelaide	Australia by 190 runs
Test 770	31 Jan–5 February	Greg Chappell	Clive Lloyd	Melbourne Cricket Ground, Melbourne	Australia by 165 runs
One-off ODI Match
No.	Date	Home captain	Away captain	Venue	Result
ODI 34	20 December	Greg Chappell	Clive Lloyd	Adelaide Oval, Adelaide	Australia by 5 wickets

== January ==
=== India in New Zealand ===
Test series
No.	Date	Home captain	Away captain	Venue	Result
Test 769	24–28 January	Glenn Turner	Sunil Gavaskar	Eden Park, Auckland	India by 8 wickets
Test 771	5–10 February	Glenn Turner	Bishan Singh Bedi	AMI Stadium, Christchurch	Match drawn
Test 772	13–17 February	Glenn Turner	Bishan Singh Bedi	Basin Reserve, Wellington	New Zealand by an innings and 33 runs
ODI series
No.	Date	Home captain	Away captain	Venue	Result
ODI 35	21 February	Glenn Turner	Bishan Singh Bedi	AMI Stadium, Christchurch	New Zealand by 9 wickets
ODI 36	22 January	Glenn Turner	Srinivas Venkataraghavan	Eden Park, Auckland	New Zealand by 80 runs

== March ==
=== India in the West Indies ===
Test Series
No.	Date	Home captain	Away captain	Venue	Result
Test 773	10–13 March	Clive Lloyd	Bishan Singh Bedi	Kensington Oval, Bridgetown	West Indies by an innings and 97 runs
Test 774	24–29 March	Clive Lloyd	Bishan Singh Bedi	Queen's Park Oval, Port of Spain	Match drawn
Test 775	7–12 April	Clive Lloyd	Bishan Singh Bedi	Queen's Park Oval, Port of Spain	India by 6 wickets
Test 776	21–25 April	Clive Lloyd	Bishan Singh Bedi	Sabina Park, Kingston	West Indies by 10 wickets
