= Chirag Patil =

Indian actor

- Born: Chirag Patil; 10 March 1987 (age 38); Mumbai, India
- Education: BSc (Hospitality Management)
- Occupation: Actor/Hotelier
- Years active: 2011–2021
- Spouse: Sana Ankola (m. 2016)
- Children: 2
- Father: Sandeep Patil

Chirag Patil (born 10 March 1987) is an Indian Actor/Hotelier who appears in Hindi and Marathi films. He is best known for his role as Omkar in Vazandar (2016) directed by Sachin Kundalkar. Patil made his big screen debut with Raada Rox (2011), the film was directed by Rahul Thackeray and Heyramb S Khot. He made his Bollywood debut with Chargesheet (2011) directed by Dev Anand. He is the son of a famous Indian cricketer Sandeep Patil and played the role of his father in the movie 83 based on the 1983 Cricket World Cup win by the Indian Cricket team.

Chirag is also the founder of 'R.C.S.P Hotels & Resorts' under which he owns and operates 'The Farmhouse' a boutique lakefront resort in Karjat.

'R.C.S.P Hotels & Resorts' also manage & operate several other properties in Maharashtra.

== Media image ==
Most Desirable Men of Maharashtra
Sponsor	Year	Rank	
Sponsor	Year	Film	Ref.
The Times of India, Maharashtra Times	2019	22	
The Times of India, Maharashtra Times	2020	13	

== Filmography ==
=== Hindi films ===
Year	Title	Director	Notes	Ref.
2011	Chargesheet	Dev Anand		
2012	Le Gaya Saddam	Amjad Khan		
2012	No Smoking	Prateek Patil	Short Film	
2013	Wake Up India	Babloo Seshadri		
2013	Villa	Prateek Patil		
2014	Lost and Found	Avi Vasu	Short film	
2021	83	Kabir Khan		

=== Marathi films ===
Year	Title	Director	Ref.
2011	Raada Rox	Rahul Thackeray, Heramb Khot	
2016	Vazandar	Sachin Kundalkar	
2016	Nidray	Rohit Dhiwar	
2017	Whatsup Lagna	Vishwas Joshi	
2018	Asehi Ekada Vhave	Sushrut Bhagwat	
2018	Love Betting	Raju Meshram	
2019	Dil Dosti Deewangi	Shirish Rane	
2019	Marathi Paul Padate Pudhe	Swapnil Mayekar	

=== Marathi TV series ===
Year	Title	Director	Character played	Channel	Ref.
2015	Yek Number	Girish Mohite	Deva	Star Pravah	
