= Jason Clive Lloyd =

English-Guyanese footballer

Personal information
- Full name: Jason Clive Lloyd
- Date of birth: 1981 (age 44–45)
- Place of birth: Stockport, England
- Position: Goalkeeper

International career
Years	Team	Apps	(Gls)
2006–2010	Guyana	12	(0)

Jason Clive Lloyd is a retired professional footballer who played for the Guyana national football team as a goalkeeper.

His father is West Indies cricketer Clive Lloyd.

In August 2010 it was reported that he was on trial with English Football League club Stockport County. He also had a trial at Crewe Alexandra FC in 2006. He had a brief stint at Sun Sports F.C. in 2014.

Jason Clive Lloyd played the role of cricketer Joel Garner in the Bollywood film 83.
