= Sanjay Jagdale MPCA Academy =

Sanjay Jagdale MPCA Academy is located in Holkar Stadium, Indore. The academy was named after Sanjay Jagdale. Academy was established in 2008 is a cricket facility of the Madhya Pradesh Cricket Association for training young cricketers who are identified as having the potential to represent the Madhya Pradesh cricket team. The academy provides regular cricket coaching, specific nutrition, health check up, fitness management, and purposeful recreation along with the education to the potentially talented young cricketers. The academy has sub-academies in Gwalior, Sagar, Bhopal, Hoshangabad, Rewa and Jabalpur.
