= Balwinder Sandhu =

Indian cricketer

Personal information
- Full name: Balwinder Singh Sandhu
- Born: 3 August 1956 (age 70); Bombay, Bombay State, India
- Batting: Right-handed
- Bowling: Right arm medium-fast
- Role: Bowler

International information
- National side: India (1982–1984)
- Test debut (cap 162): 14 January 1983 v Pakistan
- Last Test: 12 November 1983 v West Indies
- ODI debut (cap 42): 3 December 1982 v Pakistan
- Last ODI: 31 October 1984 v Pakistan

Domestic team information
- Years: Team
- 1980/81–1986/87: Bombay

Career statistics
Competition	Test	ODI	FC	LA
Matches	8	22	55	42
Runs scored	214	51	1,003	159
Batting average	30.57	12.75	21.80	17.66
100s/50s	0/2	0/0	0/8	0/0
Top score	71	16*	98	32*
Balls bowled	1,020	1,110	9,277	2,178
Wickets	10	16	168	36
Bowling average	55.70	47.68	27.91	40.80
5 wickets in innings	0	0	5	0
10 wickets in match	0	0	0	0
Best bowling	3/87	3/27	6/64	3/27
Catches/stumpings	1/–	5/–	19/–	12/–
Medal record
Men's Cricket
Representing India
ICC Cricket World Cup
Winner	1983 England and Wales
- Source: CricketArchive, 30 September 2008

Balwinder Singh Sandhu (born 3 August 1956) is a former Indian international cricketer. He represented India in eight Tests and twenty-two One Day International (ODIs) matches as a medium pace bowler who could swing the ball both ways and was a useful lower order batsman. Sandhu was a member of the Indian team that won the 1983 Cricket World Cup.

== Career ==
A late starter in cricket, Sandhu's break came when he was spotted during a summer coaching camp by the former first class cricketer Yeshwant 'Baba' Sidhaye. Next year, he came under the influence of the famous coach Ramakant Achrekar and later the Ranji player Hemu Dalvi.

Sandhu's chance in first class cricket came in 1980-81 when Karsan Ghavri, the regular opening bowler for Bombay, was away with the national side. Sandhu did not play in the first two matches of the season but then he debuted against Gujarat where he claimed nine wickets. He was not part of the side to play in the final against Delhi that season, but was included at the last moment when the originally chosen Ravi Kulkarni dropped out. In a sensational spell, he reduced Delhi to 18–5 on the first morning and finished with nine wickets in the match. His 25 wickets in the season came at an average of 18.72.

Early in the 1982–83 season, in the Duleep Trophy match for West Zone against South, he took eight wickets and scored 56 while batting at No.11. Another five wicket haul in the Irani Trophy put him in the Indian team that toured Pakistan.

Following a heel bone injury to Madan Lal, Sandhu made his debut in the fourth Test at Hyderabad. His first two wickets came off successive balls when he dismissed Mohsin Khan and Haroon Rashid. Those were India's only successes for a long time as Javed Miandad and Mudassar Nazar then went about setting a world record partnership. Sandhu scored 71 quick runs batting at No.9.

He scored 68 in the first innings at Bridgetown against West Indies following an Indian collapse. In the next Test, his opening spell reduced the West Indies to three down for one run.

Sandhu played a significant role in the Indian team that won the 1983 World Cup. Batting at No.11 in the final, he put on 22 runs with Syed Kirmani during which he was hit on his head by a bouncer. Later, he famously clean bowled Gordon Greenidge with a huge inswinger to which the batsman had shouldered arms. That was the third time within 3 months he had bowled Greenidge. He bowled Greenidge for the fourth time in a 1983 tour match between West Zone and the West Indies. His last Test was also against the West Indies later that year at Ahmedabad. He took a single wicket in that match, which was the only that was missed by Kapil Dev who took 9 for 83 in the same innings. Thereafter he did little in any form of cricket. His 98 against Tamil Nadu was important in Bombay taking the first innings lead in the Ranji semifinal of 1984–85.

He served as the coach of Mumbai and Punjab, and worked with the National Cricket Academy. In the 1990s he played club cricket in Kenya and did some coaching there.

He was associated with the Indian Cricket League (ICL) for some time. He has two daughters.

== In popular culture ==
Punjabi Singer and actor Ammy Virk played his role in the film 83 (2021) directed by Kabir Khan based on the 1983 Cricket World Cup.
