= Clive Lloyd =

West Indies cricketer

Sir Clive Lloyd CBE AO CM
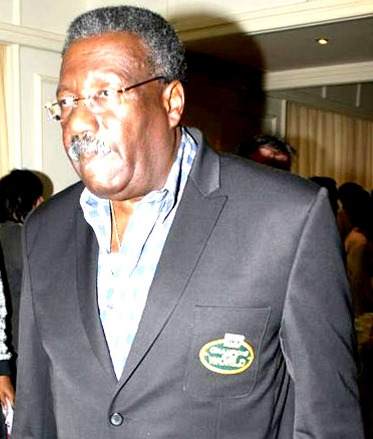

Personal information
- Full name: Clive Hubert Lloyd
- Born: 31 August 1944 (age 82); Georgetown, British Guiana (now Guyana)
- Nickname: Big C, Hubert, Super Cat
- Height: 6 ft 5 in (1.96 m)
- Batting: Left-handed
- Bowling: Right-arm medium
- Role: Batsman
- Relatives: Lance Gibbs (cousin)

International information
- National side: West Indies (1966–1985)
- Test debut (cap 125): 13 December 1966 v India
- Last Test: 30 December 1984 v Australia
- ODI debut (cap 9): 5 September 1973 v England
- Last ODI: 6 March 1985 v Pakistan

Domestic team information
- Years: Team
- 1964–1983: Guyana/British Guiana
- 1968–1986: Lancashire

Career statistics
Competition	Test	ODI	FC	LA
Matches	110	87	490	378
Runs scored	7,515	1,977	31,232	10,915
Batting average	46.67	39.54	49.26	40.27
100s/50s	19/39	1/11	79/172	12/69
Top score	242*	102	242*	134*
Balls bowled	1,716	358	9,699	2,926
Wickets	10	8	114	71
Bowling average	62.20	26.25	36.00	27.57
5 wickets in innings	0	0	0	0
10 wickets in match	0	0	0	0
Best bowling	2/13	2/4	4/48	4/33
Catches/stumpings	90/–	39/–	377/–	146/–
Medal record
Men's Cricket
Representing West Indies
ICC Cricket World Cup
Winner	1975 England
Winner	1979 England
Runner-up	1983 England and Wales
- Source: Espncricinfo, 24 January 2009

Sir Clive Hubert Lloyd (born 31 August 1944) is a Guyanese-British former cricketer and captain of the West Indies cricket team. Widely regarded as one of the greatest captains of all time, Lloyd captained the West Indies between 1974 and 1985 and oversaw their rise to become among the greatest Test and One Day International teams of the 20th century. During his captaincy, West Indies won the 1975 Cricket World Cup (with Lloyd scoring a century) and 1979 Cricket World Cup, while losing the 1983 Cricket World Cup final to India. He is also one of the most successful Test captains of all time: during his captaincy the team had a run of 27 matches without defeat, which included 11 wins in succession (Viv Richards acted as captain for one of the 27 matches, against Australia at Port of Spain in 1983–84). He was the first West Indian player to earn 100 international caps. In 1971, he was named a Wisden Cricketer of the Year.

Lloyd was a 6' 5" powerful middle-order batsman with stooping shoulders, and occasional medium-pace bowler. In his youth he was also a strong cover point fielder. He wore glasses as a result of being poked in the eye with a ruler. His Test match debut came in 1966. Lloyd scored 7,515 runs at Test level, at an average of 46.67. He hit 70 sixes in his Test career, which is the 20th-highest number of any player. He played for his home nation of Guyana in West Indies domestic cricket, and for Lancashire (he was made captain in 1981) in England. Lloyd was the first West Indian player to take a wicket on his first ball on ODI debut. Since retiring as a player, Lloyd has remained heavily involved in cricket, managing the West Indies in the late 1990s, and coaching and commentating. He was an ICC match referee from 2001 to 2006. In 2009, Lloyd was inducted into the ICC Cricket Hall of Fame. He was knighted in the 2020 New Year Honours for services to cricket.

== Early life ==
Lloyd grew up in Georgetown, British Guiana, where his father worked as a chauffeur for a local doctor. He was the second oldest of two boys and four girls. Lloyd was the captain of the Chatham High School cricket team from the age of 14. His father died in 1958, and Lloyd left school to work in the administrative section of the Georgetown hospital to help support the family at age 16. He then played club cricket for Demerara Cricket Club. He first represented British Guiana in 1964.

One of his childhood memories is of sitting in a tree outside the ground overlooking the sightscreen watching Garry Sobers score two centuries for West Indies v Pakistan.

== Career ==
Lloyd made his Test debut during the West Indian tour to India on 13 December 1966 against India. He scored 82 in the first innings and 78 not out in the second. After the tour to India, Lloyd joined Haslingden and played in the Lancashire League. Lloyd said of it "It was a real culture shock when I first got there because it was pretty cold. It was windy and raining and I hadn't been that cold in my life". He scored 861 runs in 1967 and then 1226 runs in 1968. He said of the experience "...it gave you a chance to hone your skills and your technique because the conditions were so different than what I was used to". He also played for the Derrick Robin's XI in 1967. He then played for Lancashire from 1968 until 1986. Lloyd scored 521 runs in John Player league matches in 1970 at an average of 57.88 and Lancashire won both the John Player League and Gillette Cup in 1970.

In 1971–72, Lloyd suffered a back injury while playing for a Rest of the World team at the Adelaide Oval. He was fielding in the covers when Ashley Mallett hit a lofted drive towards his area. He made an effort to take the catch but it bounced out of his hands when he hit the ground awkwardly. When he went to get up, he felt a stabbing pain in his back and he was unable to move. He spent the next few weeks in an Adelaide hospital flat on his back. Lloyd was able to return to the West Indies in February 1972 and played for Guyana against Barbados on 26 February and scored 60 runs. He then scored 133 and 104 not out for Guyana against the touring New Zealand team. He was recalled to play for the West Indies in the fourth test against New Zealand and was run out for 43 runs in the first innings. This led to bottles being thrown on the pitch. Lloyd had to go to the radio commentary team and broadcast an appeal for calm which allowed the game to be restarted 20 minutes later.

In the fifth test match in Mumbai against India in 1975, Lloyd scored his highest first-class score of 242 not out. This helped the West Indies win the final test match after the series was tied (2-2) after first four matches. Lloyd batted for 429 minutes and had a 250 run partnership with Deryck Murray. Lloyd said of the innings: "I went past 200 and really felt that I could have got to 300 that day had not a crowd riot halted play. What happened was that a lone spectator, a young lad in his teens, jumped the fence and came on to shake my hand after I got 200. Since it was not a mass invasion, I thought nothing of it but the police had other ideas. In front of everyone they used their long bamboo sticks, the lathis, with a vengeance on the poor boy and incensed the crowd to such an extent that, by tea, there was a full-scale riot which left the place looking like a battlefield. We remained in our dressing room and were never in any danger".

In the 1975 Cricket World Cup Final against Australia, the West Indies were deep in trouble at 3/50 when Lloyd strode to the crease. He duly made 102 from 85 balls, the only limited overs international century of his career. Lloyd was described as "more than able to handle everything the Australians threw at him after his team’s sedate start". At one stage during his innings, he hooked Dennis Lillee for six runs. With Rohan Kanhai he added 149 for the West Indies to win by 17 runs. Play ended at 8:40pm and was the longest day's play ever at Lord's.

The 1975–76 West Indies tour of Australia was considered a disappointment for the West Indies as they lost the test series 5–1. Lloyd however had a successful tour with the bat scoring 469 runs at an average of 46.9. The humiliation of the defeat in Australia coupled with the incessant racism encountered during the matches documented in Fire in Babylon, served as an impetus for Lloyd to nurture fast bowling talent and remake the existing image of West Indian cricket from "Caribbean crowd pleasers" to fierce competitors and winners. Subsequently, the quartet of Andy Roberts, Michael Holding, Joel Garner and Colin Croft heralded an era of unprecedented success for West Indian cricket, in which they avenged all their humiliating losses to Australia and England.

Lloyd captained the West Indies on their tour of New Zealand in 1979. He said of the tour "We were jaded and Viv Richards had gone home with a sore back". The tour was noted for some controversial umpiring decisions and bad blood between the teams. Lloyd said "They were just bad umpires but we should not have behaved in that manner. I think if I'd had my time over again I'd have handled it differently. I regret it even until this day, that things went so far".

On 22 January 1985, Lloyd was made an honorary Officer of the Order of Australia for his services to the sport of cricket, particularly in relation to his outstanding and positive influence on the game in Australia.

In 2005, Lloyd offered his patronage to Major League Cricket for their inaugural Interstate Cricket Cup in the United States, to be named the Sir Clive Lloyd Cup. His son, Jason Clive Lloyd, was a goalkeeper for the Guyana national football team. In 2007, Lloyd's authorised biography, Supercat, was published. It was written by the cricket journalist Simon Lister.

In 2022, Lloyd received a knighthood at an investiture ceremony at Windsor Castle.

Clive is regarded as one of the greatest captains in the history of the game.

== Personal life ==
Lloyd is a fan of English football club Everton FC. He is the cousin of spin bowler Lance Gibbs.
