= East Africa at the Cricket World Cup =

The East Africa cricket team was a cricket team representing Kenya, Uganda, Tanzania and Zambia. Their first game was against a South African, Non-European side in 1958, and they appeared in the 1975 World Cup. East Africa was an Associate Member of the ICC from 1966 to 1989, after which its place was taken by East and Central Africa.

== Cricket World Cup Record ==
Cricket World Cup record								Qualification record				
Year	Round	Position	GP	W	L	T	NR	Pld	W	L	T	NR
(England) 1975	Group Stage	8/8	3	0	3	0	0	No qualifier held (qualified by invitation)				
(England) 1979	Did not qualify							4	2	1	0	1
(England) 1983	Did not qualify							7	1	3	0	3
(India) (Pakistan) 1987	Did not qualify							6	2	4	0	0
(Australia) (New Zealand) 1992	Not eligible – not an ICC member							Not an ICC member (part of East and Central Africa)				
(India) (Pakistan) (Sri Lanka) 1996	Not eligible – not an ICC member							Not an ICC member (part of East and Central Africa)				
(England) (Scotland) (Republic of Ireland) (Netherlands) 1999	Not eligible – not an ICC member							Not an ICC member (part of East and Central Africa)				
(South Africa) (Zimbabwe) (Kenya) 2003	Not eligible – not an ICC member							Not an ICC member (part of East and Central Africa)				
Total	Group Stage	0 titles	3	0	3	0	0	17	5	8	0	4

=== World Cup Record (By Team) ===
Cricket World Cup matches (By team)
Total : 3 Wins – 0 Ties – 3 Losses – 3 games played
Against	Wins	Draws	Losses	Total
England	0	0	1	1
India	0	0	1	1
New Zealand	0	0	1	1

== Tournament results ==
=== 1975 Cricket World Cup ===
East Africa qualified for the first Cricket World Cup in 1975 by invitation, and were drawn against hosts England, India and New Zealand. They lost all three matches, and failed to qualify for the Knockout stage.

Squad

- Harilal Shah (c)
- Frasat Ali
- Jawahir Shah
- Ramesh Sethi
- Zulfiqar Ali
- Yunus Badat
- Hamish McLeod
- Mehmood Quaraishy
- Don Pringle
- Praful Mehta
- John Nagenda
- Parbhu Nana
- Shiraz Sumar
- Samuel Walusimbi

Results

Group stage (Group A)				Semifinal	Final	Overall Result
Opposition Result	Opposition Result	Opposition Result	Rank	Opposition Result	Opposition Result	Overall Result
New Zealand; L by 181 runs	India; L by 10 wickets	England; L by 196 runs	4	Did not advance		Group stage

Scorecards

Group stage (Group A)

7 June 1975
Scorecard

New Zealand; 309/5 (60 overs)	v	East Africa; 128/8 (60 overs)
Glenn Turner 171* (201); Parbhu Nana 1/34 (12 overs)		Frasat Ali 45 (123); Dayle Hadlee 3/21 (12 overs)

New Zealand won by 181 runs
Edgbaston, Birmingham
Umpires: Dickie Bird (Eng) and Arthur Fagg (Eng)
Player of the match: Glenn Turner (NZ)

- New Zealand won the toss and elected to bat.
- Frasat Ali, Harilal Shah, Jawahir Shah, Hamish McLeod, Mehmood Quaraishy, John Nagenda, Parbhu Nana, Ramesh Sethi, Shiraz Sumar, Samuel Walusimbi and Zulfiqar Ali (all East Africa) all made their ODI debuts.

11 June 1975
Scorecard

East Africa; 120 (55.3 overs)	v	India; 123/0 (29.5 overs)
Jawahir Shah 37 (60); Madan Lal 3/15 (9.3 overs)		Sunil Gavaskar 65 (86); Don Pringle 0/14 (3 overs)

India won by 10 wickets
Headingley, Leeds
Umpires: Dickie Bird (Eng) and Arthur Jepson (Eng)
Player of the match: Farokh Engineer (Ind)

- East Africa won the toss and chose to bat.
- Praful Mehta, Don Pringle and Yunus Badat (all East Africa) made their ODI debuts.

14 June 1975
Scorecard

England; 290/5 (60 overs)	v	East Africa; 94 (52.3 overs)
Dennis Amiss 88 (116); Zulfiqar Ali 3/63 (12 overs)		Ramesh Sethi 30 (102); John Snow 4/11 (12 overs)

England won by 196 runs
Edgbaston, Birmingham
Umpires: Bill Alley (Aus) and John Langridge (Eng)
Player of the match: John Snow (Eng)

- East Africa won the toss and chose to field.

== Records and statistics ==
=== Team records ===
Highest innings totals

Score	Opponent	Venue	Season
128/8 (60 overs)	New Zealand	Birmingham	1975
120/10 (55.3 overs)	India	Leeds	1975
94/10 (52.3 overs)	England	Birmingham	1975
Last updated: 14 June 1975

=== Batting records ===
Most runs

Runs	Player	Mat	Inn	Avg	100s	50s	Period
57	Frasat Ali	3	3	19.00	—N/a	—N/a	1975–-1975
54	Ramesh Sethi	3	3	18.00	—N/a	—N/a	1975–-1975
46	Jawahir Shah	3	3	15.33	—N/a	—N/a	1975–-1975
41	Mehmood Quaraishy	3	3	20.50	—N/a	—N/a	1975–-1975
39	Zulfiqar Ali	3	3	19.50	—N/a	—N/a	1975–-1975
Last updated: 14 June 1975

Highest individual innings

Score	Player	Opponent	Venue	Season
45	Frasat Ali	New Zealand	Birmingham	1975
37	Jawahir Shah	India	Leeds	1975
30	Zulfiqar Ali	New Zealand	Birmingham	1975
30	Ramesh Sethi	England	Birmingham	1975
23	Ramesh Sethi	India	Leeds	1975
Last updated: 14 June 1975

Highest partnerships

Runs	Players	Opposition	Venue	Season
42 (6th wicket)	Ramesh Sethi & Jawahir Shah	v India	Leeds	1975
37 (7th wicket)	Zulfiqar Ali & Mehmood Quaraishy	v New Zealand	Birmingham	1975
30 (1st wicket)	Samuel Walusimbi & Frasat Ali	v New Zealand	Birmingham	1975
30 (1st wicket)	Ramesh Sethi & Mehmood Quaraishy	v England	Birmingham	1975
26 (1st wicket)	Samuel Walusimbi & Frasat Ali	v India	Leeds	1975
Last updated: 14 June 1975

=== Bowling statistics ===
Most wickets

Wickets	Player	Matches	Avg.	Econ.	BBI	4W	5W	Period
4	Zulfiqar Ali	3	41.50	4.74	3/63	0	0	1975–1975
3	Mehmood Quaraishy	3	31.33	5.22	2/55	0	0	1975–1975
1	John Nagenda	1	50.00	5.55	1/50	0	0	1975–1975
1	Ramesh Sethi	3	100.00	5.00	1/51	0	0	1975–1975
1	Parbhu Nana	3	116.00	4.02	1/34	0	0	1975–1975
Last updated: 14 June 1975
