= 1975 Cricket World Cup squads =

This is a list of cricket squads that were selected for the 1975 Cricket World Cup which took place in England between 7 and 21 June 1975. The eight teams competing in the competition were restricted to selecting a 14-member squad before the tournament began.

== Australia ==
Manager: F.W. Bennett

Player	Date of birth	Batting style	Bowling style	First class team
Ian Chappell (c)	26 September 1943	Right-handed	Right-arm leg spin	South Australia
Greg Chappell (vc)	7 August 1948	Right-handed	Right-arm medium	Queensland
Ross Edwards	1 December 1942	Right-handed	Wicket-keeper	Western Australia
Gary Gilmour	26 June 1951	Left-handed	Left-arm fast medium	New South Wales
Alan Hurst	15 July 1950	Right-handed	Right-arm fast	Victoria
Bruce Laird	21 November 1950	Right-handed	–	Western Australia
Dennis Lillee	18 July 1949	Right-handed	Right-arm fast	Western Australia
Rick McCosker	11 December 1946	Right-handed	Right-arm legbreak	New South Wales
Ashley Mallett	13 July 1945	Right-handed	Right-arm offbreak	South Australia
Rod Marsh (wk)	4 November 1947	Left-handed	Wicket-keeper	Western Australia
Jeff Thomson	16 August 1950	Right-handed	Right-arm fast	Queensland
Alan Turner	23 July 1950	Left-handed	–	New South Wales
Max Walker	12 September 1948	Right-handed	Right-arm fast-medium	Victoria
Doug Walters	21 December 1945	Right-handed	Right-arm medium	New South Wales

- Sources: The Canberra Times; The Times

== East Africa ==
Manager: Jasmer Singh Grewal

Player	Date of birth	Batting style	Bowling style	National team
Harilal Shah (c)	14 April 1943	Right-handed	Right-arm medium	Kenya
Frasat Ali	31 July 1949	Right-handed	Right-arm medium	Kenya
Zulfiqar Ali	1947	Right-handed	Right-arm medium	Kenya
Yunus Badat	1943	Right-handed	–	Zambia
Hamish McLeod (wk)		Left-handed	Wicket-keeper	Zambia
Praful Mehta (wk)	1941	Left-handed	Wicket-keeper	Tanzania
John Nagenda	25 April 1938	Right-handed	Right-arm fast-medium	Uganda
Parbhu Nana	17 August 1933	Right-handed	Left-arm orthodox spin	Zambia
Don Pringle	1 May 1932	Right-handed	Right-arm medium	Kenya
Mehmood Quaraishy	4 February 1942	Right-handed	–	Kenya
Ramesh Sethi	4 September 1941	Right-handed	Right-arm offbreak	Kenya
Jawahir Shah	1942	Right-handed	–	Kenya
Shiraz Sumar	1950	Right-handed	–	Tanzania
Samuel Walusimbi	1948	Right-handed	Left-arm medium	Uganda

- Source: The Times

== England ==
Player	Date of birth	Batting style	Bowling style	First class team
Mike Denness (c)	1 December 1940	Right-handed	–	Kent
Dennis Amiss	7 April 1943	Right-handed	–	Warwickshire
Geoff Arnold	3 September 1944	Right-handed	Right-arm fast-medium	Surrey
Keith Fletcher	20 May 1944	Right-handed	Right-arm legbreak	Essex
Tony Greig	6 October 1946	Right-handed	Right-arm medium	Sussex
Frank Hayes	6 December 1946	Right-handed	Right-arm medium	Lancashire
John Jameson (wk)	30 June 1941	Right-handed	Wicket-keeper	Warwickshire
Alan Knott (wk)	9 April 1946	Right-handed	Wicket-keeper	Kent
Peter Lever	17 September 1940	Right-handed	Right-arm fast-medium	Lancashire
Chris Old	22 December 1948	Left-handed	Right-arm fast-medium	Yorkshire
John Snow	13 October 1941	Right-handed	Right-arm fast-medium	Sussex
Derek Underwood	8 June 1945	Right-handed	Left-arm orthodox spin Left-arm medium	Kent
Barry Wood	26 December 1942	Right-handed	Right-arm medium	Lancashire
Bob Woolmer	14 May 1948	Right-handed	Right-arm medium	Kent

- Sources: The Times

== India ==
Manager: Gulabrai Ramchand

Player	Date of birth	Batting style	Bowling style	First class team
Srinivasaraghavan Venkataraghavan (c)	21 April 1945	Right-handed	Right-arm offbreak	Tamil Nadu
Syed Abid Ali	9 September 1941	Right-handed	Right-arm medium-fast	Hyderabad
Mohinder Amarnath	24 September 1950	Right-handed	Right-arm medium	Delhi
Bishen Singh Bedi (vc)	25 September 1946	Right-handed	Left-arm slow orthodox	Delhi
Farokh Engineer (wk)	25 February 1938	Right-handed	Wicket-keeper	Bombay
Anshuman Gaekwad	23 September 1952	Right-handed	Right-arm offbreak	Baroda
Sunil Gavaskar	10 July 1949	Right-handed	Right-arm medium Right-arm offbreak	Bombay
Karsan Ghavri	28 February 1951	Left-handed	Left-arm medium	Bombay
Syed Kirmani (wk)	29 December 1949	Right-handed	Wicket-keeper	Karnataka
Madan Lal	20 March 1951	Right-handed	Right-handed medium	Delhi
Brijesh Patel	24 November 1952	Right-handed	Right-arm offbreak	Karnataka
Parthasarathy Sharma	5 January 1948	Right-handed	Right-arm medium	Rajasthan
Eknath Solkar	19 March 1948	Left-handed	Left-arm slow orthodox	Bombay
Gundappa Viswanath	12 February 1949	Right-handed	Right-arm legbreak	Karnataka

- Source: The Times

== New Zealand ==
Player	Date of birth	Batting style	Bowling style	First class team
Glenn Turner (c)	26 May 1947	Right-handed	Right-arm offbreak	Otago
Lance Cairns	10 October 1949	Right-handed	Right-arm medium-fast	Otago
Richard Collinge	2 April 1946	Right-handed	Left-arm medium-fast	Wellington
Barry Hadlee	14 December 1941	Right-handed	–	Canterbury
Dayle Hadlee	6 January 1948	Right-handed	Right-arm medium-fast	Canterbury
Richard Hadlee	3 July 1951	Left-handed	Right-arm fast	Canterbury
Brian Hastings	23 March 1940	Right-handed	Right-arm legbreak googly	Canterbury
Geoff Howarth	29 March 1951	Right-handed	Right-arm offbreak	Northern Districts
Hedley Howarth	25 December 1943	Left-handed	Left-arm orthodox spin	Auckland
Brian McKechnie	6 November 1953	Right-handed	Right-arm fast-medium	Otago
John Morrison	27 August 1947	Right-handed	Left-arm orthodox spin	Wellington
David O'Sullivan	21 February 1951	Right-handed	Slow left-arm orthodox	Central Districts
John Parker	21 February 1951	Right-handed	Right-arm legbreak	Northern Districts
Ken Wadsworth (wk)	30 November 1946	Right-handed	Wicket-keeper	Central Districts

- Source: The Times

== Pakistan ==
Player	Date of birth	Batting style	Bowling style	First class team
Asif Iqbal (c)	6 July 1943	Right-handed	Right-arm medium	Karachi
Asif Masood	23 January 1946	Right-handed	Right-arm medium-fast	PIA
Imran Khan	5 October 1952	Right-handed	Right-arm fast	PIA
Javed Miandad	12 June 1957	Right-handed	Right-arm legbreak	Habib Bank
Majid Khan (vc)	28 September 1946	Right-handed	Right-arm medium Right-arm offbreak	Rawalpindi
Mushtaq Mohammad	22 November 1943	Right-handed	Right-arm legbreak	Karachi
Naseer Malik	1 February 1950	Right-handed	Right-arm medium-fast	Karachi
Pervez Mir	24 September 1953	Right-handed	Right-arm medium-fast	Lahore
Sadiq Mohammad	3 May 1945	Left-handed	Right-arm legbreak	Karachi
Sarfraz Nawaz	1 December 1948	Right-handed	Right-arm fast-medium	Lahore
Shafiq Ahmed	28 March 1949	Right-handed	Right-arm fast-medium	Lahore
Wasim Bari (wk)	23 March 1948	Right-handed	Wicket-keeper	Karachi
Wasim Raja	3 July 1952	Left-handed	Right-arm legbreak	Lahore
Zaheer Abbas	24 July 1947	Right-handed	Right-arm offbreak	Karachi

- Source: The Times

== Sri Lanka ==
Manager: K.M.T.Perera

Player	Date of birth	Batting style	Bowling style	First class team
Anura Tennekoon (c)	29 October 1946	Right-handed	Left-arm orthodox spin	Sinhalese Sports Club
Dennis Chanmugam	13 August 1948	Right-handed	Right-arm medium	Sinhalese Sports Club
Ajit de Silva	12 December 1952	Left-handed	Left-arm orthodox spin	Bloomfield
Somachandra de Silva	11 June 1942	Right-handed	Right-arm legbreak	Bloomfield
Ranjit Fernando (wk)	22 February 1944	Right-handed	Wicket-keeper	Nondescripts
David Heyn	26 June 1945	Left-handed	Right-arm medium	Nondescripts
Lalith Kaluperuma	25 June 1949	Right-handed	Right-arm offbreak	Bloomfield
Duleep Mendis	25 August 1952	Right-handed	–	Sinhalese Sports Club
Tony Opatha	5 August 1947	Right-handed	Right-arm medium	Colombo Cricket Club
Mevan Pieris	16 February 1946	Left-handed	Right-arm fast-medium	Sinhalese Sports Club
Anura Ranasinghe	13 October 1956	Right-handed	Left-arm orthodox spin	Burgher
Michael Tissera	23 March 1939	Right-handed	Right-arm legbreak	Colombo Cricket Club
Bandula Warnapura	1 March 1953	Right-handed	Right-arm medium	Bloomfield
Sunil Wettimuny	2 February 1949	Right-handed	Wicket-keeper	Sinhalese Sports Club

- Source: The Times

== West Indies ==
Manager: Clyde Walcott

Player	Date of birth	Batting style	Bowling style	First class team
Clive Lloyd (c)	31 August 1944	Left-handed	Right-arm medium	Guyana
Keith Boyce	11 October 1943	Right-handed	Right-arm fast-medium	Barbados
Maurice Foster	9 May 1943	Right-handed	Right-arm offbreak	Jamaica
Roy Fredericks	11 November 1942	Left-handed	Slow left-arm wrist-spin	Guyana
Lance Gibbs	29 September 1934	Right-handed	Right-arm offbreak	Guyana
Gordon Greenidge	1 May 1951	Right-handed	Right-arm medium	Barbados
Vanburn Holder	10 October 1945	Right-handed	Right-arm fast-medium	Barbados
Bernard Julien	13 March 1950	Right-handed	Left-arm medium-fast	Trinidad & Tobago
Alvin Kallicharran	21 March 1949	Left-handed	Right-arm offbreak	Guyana
Rohan Kanhai	26 December 1935	Right-handed	Right-arm medium	Guyana
Collis King	11 June 1951	Right-handed	Right-arm medium	Barbados
Deryck Murray (wk)	20 May 1943	Right-handed	Wicket-keeper	Trinidad & Tobago
Viv Richards	7 March 1952	Right-handed	Right-arm offbreak	Leeward Islands
Andy Roberts	29 January 1951	Right-handed	Right-arm fast	Leeward Islands

- Source: The Times
