= East African cricket team in England in 1975 =

A cricket team representing the East African countries of Kenya, Tanzania, Uganda and Zambia toured England in the 1975 season which coincided with their participation in the 1975 Cricket World Cup.

The 1975 touring team played eleven matches, including the three One Day International matches in the world cup. Five were warm-up matches before the world cup and three were held afterwards, including one in Denmark.

== Team ==
Player	Date of Birth	Batting style	Bowling style	National team
Harilal Shah (c)	14 April 1943	Right hand	Right arm medium	Kenya
Frasat Ali	31 July 1949	Right hand	Right arm medium	Kenya
Zulfiqar Ali	1947	Right hand	Right arm medium	Kenya
Yunus Badat	1943	Right hand	–	Zambia
Hamish McLeod (wk)	Unknown	Left hand	Wicket-keeper	Zambia
Praful Mehta (wk)	1941	Left hand	Wicket-keeper	Tanzania
John Nagenda	25 April 1938	Right hand	Right arm fast-medium	Uganda
Parbhu Nana	17 August 1933	Right hand	Left arm orthodox spin	Zambia
Don Pringle	1 May 1932	Right hand	Right arm medium	Kenya
Mehmood Quaraishy	4 February 1942	Right hand	Unknown	Kenya
Ramesh Sethi	4 September 1941	Right hand	Right arm offbreak	Kenya
Jawahir Shah	1942	Right hand	–	Kenya
Shiraz Sumar	1950	Right hand	–	Tanzania
Samuel Walusimbi	1948	Right hand	Left arm medium	Uganda

== Tour matches ==
The following matches were played during the tour:

30 May 1975

National Cricket Association	v	East Africa

Mitchell's and Butler's Ground, Birmingham

1 June 1975

Taunton	v	East Africa

County Ground, Taunton

2 June 1975
Scorecard

Somerset; 263/6 (60 overs)	v	East Africa; 95 (41.4 overs)
Viv Richards 76; Zulfiqar Ali 4/52 (12 overs)		Frasat Ali 34; Brian Rose 3/7 (6 overs)

Somerset won by 168 runs
County Ground, Taunton
Umpires: L. East and E.V. Hazell

- Toss not known
- Shiraz Sumar (EAF) fell ill and was unable to bat

4 June 1975
Scorecard

Wales; 171/6d	v	East Africa; 81/5
Jim Pressdee 52		Jawahir Shah 30*

Match drawn
St Helen's Rugby and Cricket Ground, Swansea

- Toss not known
- 1-day single innings match

5 June 1975
Scorecard

Glamorgan; 153 (56.4 overs)	v	East Africa; 154/7 (58.1 overs)
Arthur Francis 37; Ramesh Sethi 4/19 (12 overs)		Jawahir Shah 60; Tony Cordle 3/34 (11 overs)

East Africa won by 3 wickets
Sophia Gardens, Cardiff
Umpires: D.J. Evans and Harold W. Jones

- Glamorgan won the toss and decided to bat

7 June 1975
Scorecard

New Zealand; 309/5 (60 overs)	v	East Africa; 128/8 (60 overs)
Glenn Turner 171* (201); Parbhu Nana 1/34 (12 overs)		Frasat Ali 45 (123); Dayle Hadlee 3/21 (12 overs)

New Zealand won by 181 runs
Edgbaston, Birmingham
Umpires: Dickie Bird (Eng) and Arthur Fagg (Eng)
Player of the match: Glenn Turner (NZ)

- New Zealand won the toss and elected to bat.
- Frasat Ali, Harilal Shah, Jawahir Shah, Hamish McLeod, Mehmood Quraishy, John Nagenda, Parbhu Nana, Ramesh Sethi, Shiraz Sumar, Samuel Walusimbi and Zulfiqar Ali (all East Africa) and Brian McKechnie (NZ) all made their ODI debuts.

11 June 1975
Scorecard

East Africa; 120 (55.3 overs)	v	India; 123/0 (29.5 overs)
Jawahir Shah 37 (60); Don Pringle 0/14 (3 overs)		Sunil Gavaskar 65 (86); Madan Lal 3/15 (9.3 overs)

India won by 10 wickets
Headingley, Leeds
Umpires: Dickie Bird (Eng) and Arthur Jepson (Eng)
Player of the match: Farokh Engineer (Ind)

- East Africa won the toss and elected to bat
- Praful Mehta, Don Pringle and Yunus Badat (all East Africa) made their ODI debuts.

14 June 1975
Scorecard

England; 290/5 (60 overs)	v	East Africa; 94 (52.3 overs)
Dennis Amiss 88 (116); John Snow 4/11 (12 overs)		Ramesh Sethi 30 (102); Zulfiqar Ali 3/63 (12 overs)

England won by 196 runs
Edgbaston, Birmingham
Umpires: Bill Alley (Aus) and John Langridge (Eng)
Player of the match: John Snow (Eng)

- East Africa won the toss and elected to field

20 June 1975
Scorecard

East Africa; 239/3 (55 overs)	v	Berkshire; 191/7 (55 overs)
Ramesh Sethi 60; John Mahoney 1/31 (10 overs)		Mike Hall 44; Zulfiqar Ali 4/37 (11 overs)

East Africa won by 48 runs
Ibis Cricket Club Ground, Reading
Umpires: Harold W. Jones and L.B. Philpott

- Toss not known
- Mehmood Quaraishy retired hurt in the East Africa innings having scored 0 (team had lost 3 wickets)

23-25 June 1975
Scorecard

Sri Lanka	v	East Africa
204 (76.5 overs); Duleep Mendis 67; Parbhu Nana 3/61 (21.5 overs)		208 (94 overs); Harilal Shah 59; Lalith Kaluperuma 2/29 (24 overs)
332/5d (68 overs); Duleep Mendis 144; Zulfiqar Ali 3/127 (28 overs)		213 (78.1 overs); Samuel Walusimbi 54; Michael Tissera 5/95 (24.1 overs)

Sri Lanka won by 115 runs
County Ground, Taunton
Umpires: Brian Knight and T.B. Scott

- Toss not known

27-29 June 1975
Scorecard

East Africa	v	Denmark
81 (32.5 overs); Ramesh Sethi 24*; Henrik Mortensen 6/35 (16.5 overs)		111 (57.4 overs); H. Sorensen 33; Zulfiqar Ali 5/43 (20.4 overs)
164 (106.4 overs); Jawahir Shah 64; Henrik Mortensen 3/34 (33 overs)		138/7 (68.4 overs); Carsten Morild 58; Zulfiqar Ali 4/56 (28 overs)

Denmark won by 3 wickets
Aalborg Chang Cricket Club Ground, Aalborg

- Toss not known
