= List of East Africa cricket captains =

This is a list of all cricketers who captained the now defunct East African cricket team in an official international match. This includes One Day Internationals and ICC Trophy games.

== Overall list ==
East Africa played its first match in 1951 and was an associate member of the ICC from 1966 to 1989.

East African Cricket Captains
Name	Country	Years
Denis Dawson	Kenya	1956-58
Malcolm Ronaldson	Tanganyika	1958
R. D. Patel	Tanganyika	1962-68
Jawahir Shah	Kenya	1972-75
Harilal Shah	Kenya	1975
Narendra Thakker	Kenya	1979
Charanjive Sharma	Kenya	1979
Keith Arnold	Zambia	1982
Pravin Desai	Tanzania	1986

== One Day International ==
East Africa played their first ODI on 7 June 1975.

East African ODI Captains
Number	Name	Country	Year	Played	Won	Tied	Lost	No Result
1	Harilal Shah	Kenya	1975	3	0	0	3	0
Overall			3	0	0	3	0	

== ICC Trophy ==
East Africa debuted in the ICC Trophy in the 1979 tournament

East African ICC Trophy Captains
Number	Name	Country	Year	Played	Won	Tied	Lost	No Result
1	Narendra Thakker	Kenya	1979-1979	2	1	0	0	1
2	Charanjive Sharma	Kenya	1979-1979	2	1	0	1	0
3	Keith Arnold	Zambia	1982-1982	5	1	0	3	1
4	Pravin Desai	Tanzania	1986-1986	6	2	0	4	0
Overall			15	5	0	8	2	
