= International cricket in 1975 =

International cricket season

The 1975 international cricket season extended from May to August 1975.

== Season overview ==
International tours
Start date	Home team	Away team	Results [Matches]			
Start date	Home team	Away team	Test	ODI	FC	LA
10 July 1975	England	Australia	0–1 [4]	—	—	—
International tournaments
Start date	Tournament				Winners	
7 June 1975	(England) 1975 Cricket World Cup				West Indies	

== June ==
=== 1975 Cricket World Cup ===
Pos	Team	Pld	W	L	T	NR	Pts	RR
1	England	3	3	0	0	0	12	4.944
2	New Zealand	3	2	1	0	0	8	4.071
3	India	3	1	2	0	0	4	3.237
4	East Africa	3	0	3	0	0	0	1.900

Source: ESPNcricinfo

Pos	Team	Pld	W	L	T	NR	Pts	RR
1	West Indies	3	3	0	0	0	12	4.346
2	Australia	3	2	1	0	0	8	4.433
3	Pakistan	3	1	2	0	0	4	4.450
4	Sri Lanka	3	0	3	0	0	0	2.778

Source: ESPNcricinfo

Group stage
No.	Date	Team 1	Captain 1	Team 2	Captain 2	Venue	Result
ODI 19	7 June	England	Mike Denness	India	Srinivas Venkataraghavan	Lord's, London	England by 202 runs
ODI 20	7 June	East Africa	Harilal Shah	New Zealand	Glenn Turner	Edgbaston Cricket Ground, Birmingham	New Zealand by 181 runs
ODI 21	7 June	Australia	Ian Chappell	Pakistan	Asif Iqbal	Headingley Cricket Ground, Leeds	Australia by 73 runs
ODI 22	7 June	Sri Lanka	Anura Tennekoon	West Indies	Clive Lloyd	Old Trafford Cricket Ground, Manchester	West Indies by 9 wickets
ODI 23	11 June	England	Mike Denness	New Zealand	Glenn Turner	Trent Bridge, Nottingham	England by 80 runs
ODI 24	11 June	East Africa	Harilal Shah	India	Srinivas Venkataraghavan	Headingley Cricket Ground, Leeds	India by 10 wickets
ODI 25	11 June	Australia	Ian Chappell	Sri Lanka	Anura Tennekoon	Kennington Oval, London	Australia by 52 runs
ODI 26	11 June	Pakistan	Majid Khan	West Indies	Clive Lloyd	Edgbaston Cricket Ground, Birmingham	West Indies by 1 wicket
ODI 27	14 June	England	Mike Denness	East Africa	Harilal Shah	Edgbaston Cricket Ground, Birmingham	England by 196 runs
ODI 28	14 June	India	Srinivas Venkataraghavan	New Zealand	Glenn Turner	Old Trafford Cricket Ground, Manchester	New Zealand by 4 wickets
ODI 29	14 June	Australia	Ian Chappell	West Indies	Clive Lloyd	Kennington Oval, London	West Indies by 7 wickets
ODI 30	14 June	Pakistan	Majid Khan	Sri Lanka	Anura Tennekoon	Trent Bridge, Nottingham	Pakistan by 192 runs
Semi-finals
No.	Date	Team 1	Captain 1	Team 2	Captain 2	Venue	Result
ODI 31	18 June	England	Mike Denness	Australia	Ian Chappell	Headingley Cricket Ground, Leeds	Australia by 4 wickets
ODI 32	18 June	New Zealand	Glenn Turner	West Indies	Clive Lloyd	Kennington Oval, London	West Indies by 5 wickets
Final
No.	Date	Team 1	Captain 1	Team 2	Captain 2	Venue	Result
ODI 33	21 June	Australia	Ian Chappell	West Indies	Clive Lloyd	Lord's, London	West Indies by 17 runs

== July ==
=== Australia in England ===
The Ashes Test series
No.	Date	Home captain	Away captain	Venue	Result
Test 760	10–14 July	Mike Denness	Ian Chappell	Edgbaston Cricket Ground, Birmingham	Australia by an innings and 85 runs
Test 761	31 Jul–5 August	Tony Greig	Ian Chappell	Lord's, London	Match drawn
Test 762	14–19 August	Tony Greig	Ian Chappell	Headingley, Leeds	Match drawn
Test 763	28 Aug–3 September	Tony Greig	Ian Chappell	Kennington Oval, London	Match drawn
