= Badat =

Badat is a surname. Notable people with the surname include:

- Alon Badat (born 1989), Israeli footballer
- Saajid Badat (born 1979), British Islamist terrorist
- Yunus Badat (born 1943), East African cricketer

== See also ==
- Sadat
