= India national cricket team record by opponent =

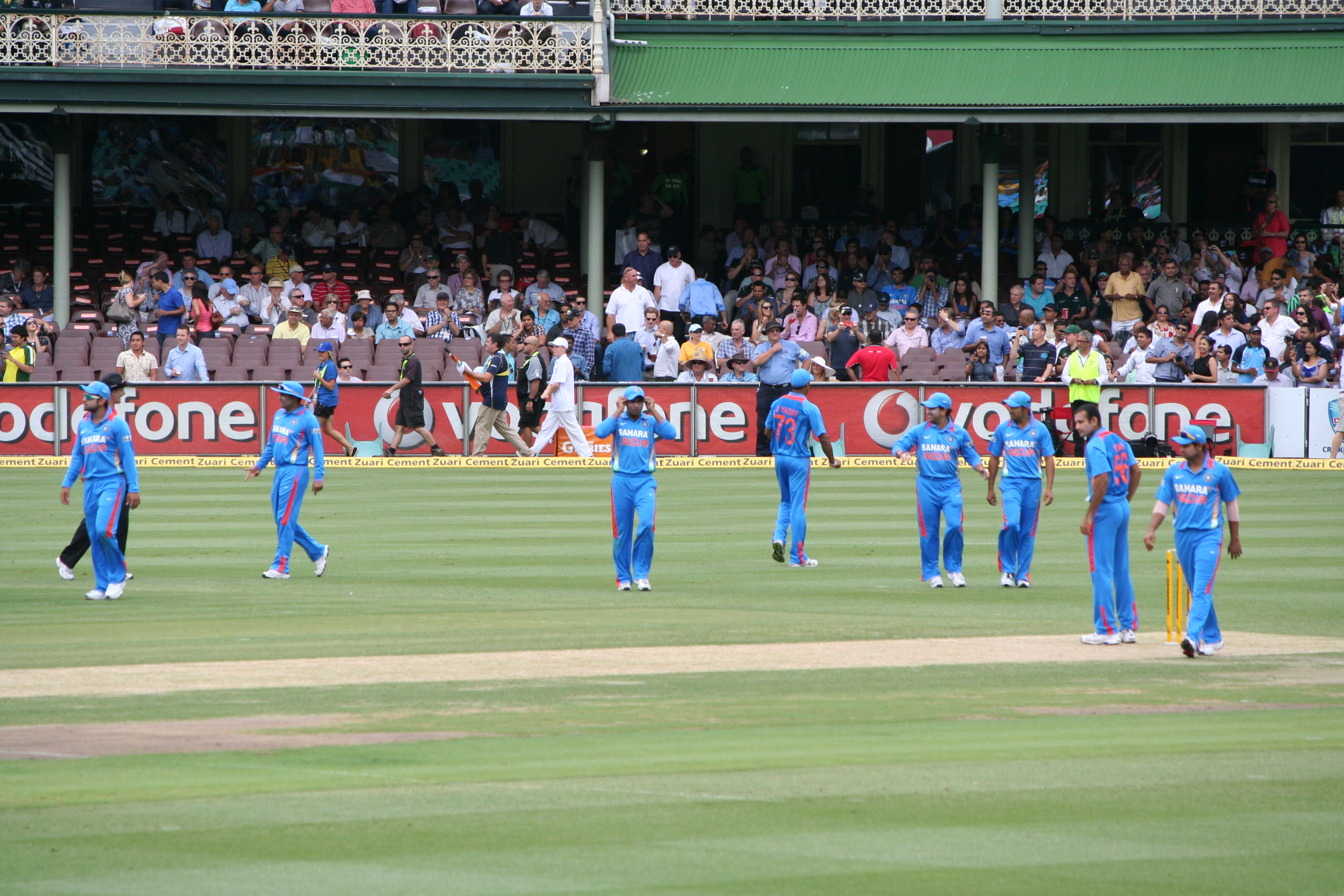
The Indian national cricket team at the Sydney Cricket Ground in 2012.

The India national cricket team represents India in international cricket and is a full member of the International Cricket Council with Test and One Day International (ODI) status. They first competed in international cricket in 1932, when they played against England in a three-day Test match; England won the match by 158 runs. India's first Test series as an independent country was against Australia. They secured their first Test win against England in 1952 at Madras Cricket Club Ground. (Note: Madras Cricket Club Ground was later renamed M. A. Chidambaram Stadium.) As of June 6, 2026, India have played 601 Test matches; they have won 187 matches, lost 188 matches, and 225 matches were drawn with one being tied. India played their first ODI match against England in 1974, but registered their first win against East Africa in 1975. As of 15 November 2026, India have played 1089 ODI matches, winning 580 matches and losing 454; 10 matches were tied and 45 matches had no result. They also won the 1983 and 2011 Cricket World Cups, along with the 2002, 2013 and the 2025 ICC Champions Trophy. (Note: India were the joint-champion with Sri Lanka in the 2002 ICC Champions Trophy.) India played their first Twenty20 International (T20I) against South Africa in 2006, winning the match by six wickets, and won the inaugural ICC World Twenty20 in 2007 along with the ICC World Twenty20 in 2024. As of 1 November 2026, they have played 303 T20I matches and won 201 of them; 85 were lost, with 6 super-over/bowl-out wins (after being tied), one tied (without a super over) and 10 having no result.

India have faced ten teams in Test cricket, with their most frequent opponent being England, against whom they have played 141 matches. India have registered more wins against England than against any other team, with 37. In ODI matches, India have played against 20 teams. They have played against Sri Lanka more frequently in ODI matches, with a winning percentage of 57.89 in 99 out of 171 matches. India have defeated Sri Lanka on 99 occasions, which is their best record in ODIs. The team have played 20 countries in T20Is, and have played 37 matches with Australia. They also have recorded the most victories against Australia, Sri Lanka and West Indies, defeating each team in twenty-two matches.

== Key ==
Key for the tables
Symbol	Meaning
Matches	Number of matches played
Won	Number of matches won
Lost	Number of matches lost
Tied	Number of matches tied
Draw	Number of matches ended in a draw
No Result	Number of matches ended with no result
Tie+Win	Number of matches tied and then won in a tiebreaker such as a bowl-out or Super Over
Tie+Loss	Number of matches tied and then lost in a tiebreaker such as a bowl-out or Super Over
%Won	Percentage of games won to those played (Note: Games that did not have a result are not taken into consideration while calculating the result percentage. Ties are counted as half a win.)
W/L Ratio	Ratio of matches won to matches lost
First	Year of the first match played by India against the country
Last	Year of the last match played by India against the country

== Test Cricket ==
Won more matches than lost
All matches drawn/tied/no result
Won equal matches to lost
Lost more matches than won

Opponent	Matches	Won	Lost	Tied	Draw	% Won	% Lost	% Drew	First	Last
Afghanistan	2	2	0	0	0	100.00	0.00	0.00	2018	2026
Australia	112	33	48	1	30	29.91	43.30	26.78	1947	2025
Bangladesh	15	13	0	0	2	86.66	0.00	13.33	2000	2024
England	141	37	53	0	51	26.24	37.58	36.17	1932	2025
New Zealand	65	22	16	0	27	33.84	24.61	41.53	1955	2024
Pakistan	59	9	12	0	38	15.25	20.33	64.40	1952	2007
South Africa	46	16	20	0	10	34.78	43.47	21.73	1992	2025
Sri Lanka	48	23	7	0	18	47.92	14.58	37.50	1982	2026
West Indies	102	25	30	0	47	24.51	29.41	46.08	1948	2025
Zimbabwe	11	7	2	0	2	63.63	18.18	18.18	1992	2005
Total	601	187	188	1	225	31.11	31.28	37.44	1932	2026
Statistics are correct as of India v Sri Lanka at Sinhalese Sports Club Cricket Ground, Colombo, 2nd Test, 23 August - 27 August 2026.

== One Day International ==
Won more matches than lost
All matches tied/no result
Won equal matches to lost
Lost more matches than won

Opponent	Matches	Won	Lost	Tied	No Result	% Won	First	Last
ICC Full Members
Afghanistan	7	6	0	1	0	92.85	2014	2026
Australia	155	59	86	0	10	40.68	1980	2025
Bangladesh	42	33	8	0	1	78.57	1988	2025
England	113	62	46	2	3	54.87	1974	2026
Ireland	3	3	0	0	0	100.00	2007	2015
New Zealand	127	65	53	1	8	55.04	1975	2026
Pakistan	136	58	73	0	5	42.64	1978	2025
South Africa	97	42	52	0	3	44.68	1991	2025
Sri Lanka	171	99	59	2	11	57.89	1979	2024
West Indies	145	74	65	2	4	51.03	1979	2026
Zimbabwe	66	54	10	2	0	81.81	1983	2022
ICC Associate Members
Bermuda	1	1	0	0	0	100.00	2007	2007
East Africa	1	1	0	0	0	100.00	1975	1975
Hong Kong	2	2	0	0	0	100.00	2008	2018
Kenya	13	11	2	0	0	84.62	1996	2004
Namibia	1	1	0	0	0	100.00	2003	2003
Nepal	1	1	0	0	0	100.00	2023	2023
Netherlands	3	3	0	0	0	100.00	2003	2023
Scotland	1	1	0	0	0	100.00	2007	2007
United Arab Emirates	3	3	0	0	0	100.00	1994	2015
Total	1088	579	454	10	45	55.99	1974	2026
Statistics are correct as of India v New Zealand at Bay Oval, Tauranga, 13 November 2026

== Twenty20 International ==
Won more matches than lost
All matches tied/no result
Won equal matches to lost
Lost more matches than won

Opponent	Matches	Won	Lost	Tied	Tie+Win	Tie+Loss	No Result	% Won	First	Last
ICC Full Members
Afghanistan	12	10	0	0	1	0	1	95.45	2010	2026
Australia	37	22	12	0	0	0	3	64.70	2007	2025
Bangladesh	18	17	1	0	0	0	0	94.44	2009	2025
England	35	18	16	0	0	0	1	52.94	2007	2026
Ireland	10	8	2	0	0	0	0	80.00	2009	2026
New Zealand	36	20	13	1	2	0	0	59.72	2007	2026
Pakistan	18	14	3	0	1	0	0	80.55	2007	2026
South Africa	36	21	14	0	0	0	1	60.00	2006	2026
Sri Lanka	34	22	9	0	2	0	1	69.69	2009	2026
West Indies	36	22	12	0	0	0	2	64.70	2009	2026
Zimbabwe	17	14	3	0	0	0	0	82.35	2010	2026
ICC Associate members
Hong Kong	1	1	0	0	0	0	0	100.00	2022	2022
Japan	1	1	0	0	0	0	0	100.00	2026	2026
Namibia	2	2	0	0	0	0	0	100.00	2021	2026
Nepal	1	1	0	0	0	0	0	100.00	2023	2023
Netherlands	2	2	0	0	0	0	0	100.00	2022	2026
Oman	1	1	0	0	0	0	0	100.00	2025	2025
Scotland	2	1	0	0	0	0	1	50.00	2007	2021
United Arab Emirates	2	2	0	0	0	0	0	100.00	2016	2025
United States	2	2	0	0	0	0	0	100.00	2024	2026
Total	303	201	85	1	6	0	10	70.82	2006	2026
Statistics are correct as of India v New Zealand at Seddon Park, Hamilton, 1 November 2026
