= Tendo Mbazzi =

Personal information
- Full name: Tendo Lubwama Mbazzi
- Born: 17 October 1974 (age 52); Mulago, Uganda
- Batting: Right-handed
- Bowling: Right-arm medium
- Relatives: Sam Walusimbi (father)

International information
- National sides: East and Central Africa (1997); Uganda (2000–2004)
- Source: CricketArchive, 2 February 2016

Tendo Lubwama Mbazzi (born 17 October 1974) is a Ugandan former international cricketer who represented both East and Central Africa and the Ugandan national team. He played as a right-arm medium-pace bowler.

== Early life ==
Mbazzi was born in Mulago, Uganda. He is the son of international cricketer Sam Walusimbi.

== Cricket career ==
Mbazzi represented the combined East and Central Africa team at the 1997 ICC Trophy. He played in all six of his team's matches, taking five wickets. His best performance was 2/26 from 7.2 overs, against West Africa. Mbazzi is first recorded as representing his home country, Uganda, at the 2000 Africa Cup, though not all records of Ugandan matches are available. He represented Uganda at the 2001 ICC Trophy, and again played every match, taking six wickets from six games. Against Argentina, he took 2/2 from just four balls, while against Israel he finished with 2/21 from ten overs. Mbazzi's final match for Uganda was a 2004 ICC Intercontinental Cup game against Kenya, which held first-class status.

== Personal life ==
As of 2020 Mbazzi was working for the Bank of Uganda as an information technology specialist.
