= Jasmer Singh Grewal =

Jasmer Singh Grewal (1930–21 September 2016) was a Kenyan cricket player and administrator.

== Biography ==
An opening batsman, Grewal played for the Kenya cricket team from 1958 to the mid-1960s. He subsequently became involved in cricket administration and later became the chairman of the Kenya Cricket Association (KCA) from 1974 to 1980. In addition to this role he was the team manager of the East Africa cricket team at the inaugural Cricket World Cup held in England in 1975. In 1996 he was appointed executive officer of the KCA. The Kenyan team beat the West Indies at the 1996 Cricket World Cup with Grewal as the team manager. He was secretary to the Kenya Federation of Sport and with Joseph McFarnell organised Kenya's commercial cricket league. In addition to cricket Grewal also administered other sports as well including association football and hockey.

In 2004 he supported the foundation of the organisation Friends of Kenya Cricket, which was launched to raise cricketing profile of Kenya and provide assistance to Kenyan cricket at all levels in readiness for Kenya to achieve Test status after its strong performance at the 2003 Cricket World Cup. Later the KCA's media manager, he supported Tom Tikolo to succeed Sharad Ghai as KCA chairman. In 2008 he was appointed to a task force to investigate the Kenyan team's poor performances at the 2007 Cricket World Cup and July 2007 tour of England.

In 1992 Grewal was awarded and honorary life membership of the Marylebone Cricket Club to recognise his contribution to the game. In 2005 he received the International Cricket Council's (ICC) Lifetime Recognition Award. The first, and only, Kenyan to receive the award it was presented to him by ICC president Esha Maini in Nairobi. He was fondly referred to as 'The Father of Cricket' in Kenya and was inducted into Kenya's Hall of Fame at the Sportsman of the Year awards in 2015.

He died in 2016 at Aga Khan Hospital in Mombasa after a long illness.
