= List of East Africa ODI cricketers =

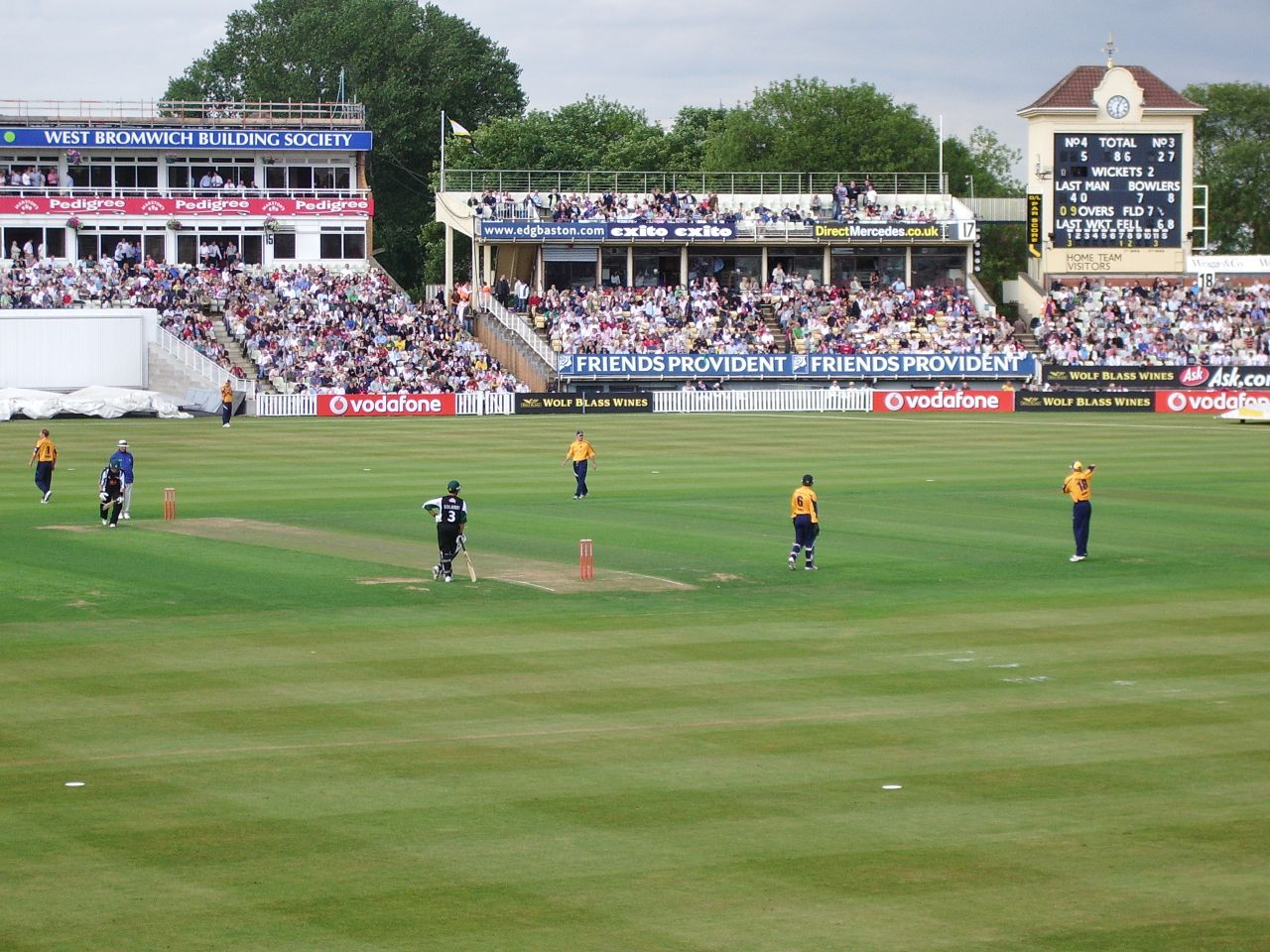
East Africa played two of their three One Day Internationals during the 1975 World Cup at Edgbaston (pictured).

The East Africa cricket team played three ODIs in the 1975 World Cup, with 14 players representing East Africa in these matches. A One Day International is an international cricket match between two representative teams, each having ODI status, as determined by the International Cricket Council (ICC).

The East Africa cricket team was first formed in 1958. East Africa were invited to compete in the 1975 World Cup in England and the team included players from Kenya, Uganda, Zambia and Tanzania. East Africa played its first ODI against New Zealand at Edgbaston. The team played two further ODIs during the tournament against India at Headingley and England at Edgbaston. East Africa struggled against the Test playing nations in their group, losing heavily in all their ODIs. East Africa continued to play in the ICC Trophy in 1982 and 1986, however East Africa ceased to be a member of the ICC in 1989 when it was amalgamated into the East and Central Africa cricket team. Kenya became a member of the ICC in their own right in 1981.

This list includes all players who have played at least one ODI match and is initially arranged in the order of debut appearance. Where more than one player won their first cap in the same match, those players are initially listed alphabetically at the time of debut.

== Key ==
General

- ‡ – Captain
- † – Wicket-keeper
- First – Year of debut
- Last – Year of latest game
- Mat – Number of matches played

Batting

- Inn – Number of innings batted
- NO – Number of innings not out
- Runs – Runs scored in career
- HS – Highest score
- 100 – Centuries scored
- 50 – Half-centuries scored
- Avg – Runs scored per dismissal
- * – Batsman remained not out

Bowling

- Balls – Balls bowled in career
- Wkt – Wickets taken in career
- BBI – Best bowling in an innings
- Ave – Average runs per wicket
- Eco – Average runs conceded per over

Fielding

- Ca – Catches taken
- St – Stumpings taken

== Players ==
- To sort this table by any statistic, click on the icon up to the column title.

East Africa ODI cricketers
No.	Name	Country	First	Last	Mat	Inn	NO	Runs	HS	Avg	Balls	Wkt	BBI	Ave	Eco	Ca	St	Ref
No.	Name	Country	First	Last	Mat	Batting					Bowling					Fielding		Ref
1	Frasat Ali	Kenya	1975	1975	3	3	0	57	45	19.00	144	–	–	–	4.45	0	0	
2	Harilal Shah ‡	Kenya	1975	1975	3	3	0	6	6	2.00	0	–	–	–	–	0	0	
3	Jawahir Shah	Kenya	1975	1975	3	3	0	46	37	15.33	0	–	–	–	–	0	0	
4	Hamish McLeod †	Zambia	1975	1975	2	2	0	5	5	2.50	0	–	–	–	–	0	0	
5	Mehmood Quaraishy	Kenya	1975	1975	3	3	0	41	19	20.50	108	3	2/55	31.33	5.22	0	0	
6	John Nagenda	Uganda	1975	1975	1	0	0	–	–	–	54	1	1/50	50.00	5.55	0	0	
7	Parbhu Nana	Zambia	1975	1975	3	3	1	9	8*	9.00	173	1	1/34	116.00	4.02	2	0	
8	Ramesh Sethi	Kenya	1975	1975	3	3	0	54	30	18.00	120	1	1/51	100.00	5.00	1	0	
9	Shiraz Sumar	Tanzania	1975	1975	1	1	0	4	4	4.00	0	–	–	–	–	0	0	
10	Samuel Walusimbi	Uganda	1975	1975	3	3	0	38	16	12.66	0	–	–	–	–	0	0	
11	Zulfiqar Ali	Kenya	1975	1975	3	3	1	39	30	19.50	210	4	3/63	41.50	4.74	1	0	
12	Praful Mehta †	Tanzania	1975	1975	1	1	0	12	12	12.00	0	–	–	–	–	0	0	
13	Donald Pringle	Kenya	1975	1975	2	2	0	5	3	2.50	90	–	–	–	3.66	0	0	
14	Yunus Badat	Zambia	1975	1975	2	2	0	1	1	0.50	0	–	–	–	–	0	0	
