= Faruk Ochimi =

Ugandan cricketer (born 1995)

Personal information
- Born: 19 December 1995 (age 30); Kampala, Uganda
- Batting: Right-handed
- Bowling: Right-arm medium
- Role: Bowler

Domestic team information
- Years: Team
- 2013/14: Uganda

Career statistics
Competition	LA
Matches	4
Runs scored	0
Batting average	0.00
100s/50s	0/0
Top score	0*
Balls bowled	168
Wickets	4
Bowling average	36.00
5 wickets in innings	0
10 wickets in match	0
Best bowling	2/58
Catches/stumpings	1/–
- Source: Cricinfo, 4 June 2022

Faruk Ochimi (born 19 December 1995) also known as Chimzy is a Ugandan former cricketer who played in the 2014 Cricket World Cup Qualifier tournament in New Zealand.

== Early life and education ==
Ochimi was born on 19 December 1995 in Naguru. He studied at Busoga College Mwiri and later joined Cavendish University for a Diploma. When he relocated to New Zealand he studied a conjoint degree of communications and sports science and holds a level 2 coaching certificate.

== Career ==
Ochimi played for Uganda in the 2014 Cricket World Cup Qualifier tournament in New Zealand. However, Ochimi and team-mate Raymond Otim did not return to Uganda with their team when the tournament ended, and remained in New Zealand where they sought asylum. Both players had planned to travel to Australia to play with other Ugandan cricketers in the country. However, before reaching Australia, both cricketers turned themselves in to the New Zealand authorities.

He worked as a volunteer coaching cricket in schools on county levels and modelling for the University of Waikato. He plays for Hamilton Cricket Club based in New Zealand.

== See also ==
- Raymond Otim
- Arthur Kyobe
