= Kenyan cricket team in South Africa in 2001–02 =

The Kenya national cricket team toured South Africa from 30 September to 24 October 2001 and played in six One Day Internationals against South Africa and India, competing in the 2001 Standard Bank Triangular Tournament.

== ODI series ==
- South Africa v India at Wanderers Stadium, Johannesburg – South Africa won by 6 wickets
- South Africa v Kenya at Willowmoore Park Main Oval, Benoni – South Africa won by 7 wickets
- South Africa v India at Supersport Park, Centurion – India won by 41 runs
- India v Kenya at St George's Park, Port Elizabeth – Kenya won by 70 runs
- South Africa v Kenya at Newlands Cricket Ground, Cape Town – South Africa won by 208 runs
- India v Kenya at Boland Bank Park, Paarl – India won by 186 runs

Despite their win against India, Kenya failed to reach the final, which was won by South Africa.
