= Raymond Otim =

Ugandan cricketer (born 1986)

Personal information
- Full name: Raymond Otim
- Born: 21 October 1986 (age 40); Kampala, Uganda
- Batting: Right-handed
- Bowling: Leg break

International information
- National side: Uganda

Career statistics
Competition	LA	T20
Matches	3	2
Runs scored	11	34
Batting average	3.66	17.00
100s/50s	–/–	–/–
Top score	8	25
Balls bowled	–	–
Wickets	–	–
Bowling average	–	–
5 wickets in innings	–	–
10 wickets in match	–	–
Best bowling	–	–
Catches/stumpings	1/–	1/–
- Source: CricketArchive, 25 January 2011

Raymond Otim (born 21 October 1986) in Kampala) is a Ugandan cricketer who played in the 2005 ICC Trophy in Ireland and the 2006 U-19 Cricket World Cup in Sri Lanka. He has also played in List A cricket for Uganda.

== Career ==
Otim played for Uganda in the 2014 Cricket World Cup Qualifier tournament in New Zealand. However, Otim and team-mate Faruk Ochimi did not return to Uganda with their team when the tournament ended, and remained in New Zealand where they sought asylum. Both players planned to travel to Australia to play with other Ugandan cricketers in the country. However, before reaching Australia, both cricketers turned themselves in to the New Zealand authorities.

== See also ==
- Irfan Afridi
- Hamza Almuzahim
- Davis Arinaitwe
- Zephania Arinaitwe
