= Mehmood Quraishy =

Kenyan cricketer (born 1942)

Personal information
- Born: 4 February 1942 (age 84); Kenya
- Batting: Right-handed
- Bowling: Right-arm medium

International information
- National side: East Africa
- ODI debut (cap 5): 7 June, 1975 v New Zealand
- Last ODI: 14 June, 1975 v England
- Source: CricInfo, 20 January 2022

Mehmood Quraishy (born 4 February 1942), was a Kenyan cricketer who played three One day Internationals in the 1975 World Cup for East Africa. He also appeared in one first-class cricket match in the 1975 season, having earlier played a match for the Coast Cricket Association XI against a touring team from Pakistan International Airlines in 1964 at Mombasa.

He was later the manager of the Kenyan team. While on tour to South Africa in 2001 he had chest pains at the ground in Port Elizabeth and was assisted to hospital to undergo heart bypass surgery.
