= Samuel Walusimbi =

Ugandan cricketer (born 1948)

Personal information
- Born: 1948 (age 77–78); Uganda
- Batting: Right-handed
- Bowling: Left-arm medium
- Relatives: Tendo Mbazzi (son)

International information
- National side: East Africa
- ODI debut (cap 10): 7 June 1975 v New Zealand
- Last ODI: 14 June 1975 v England
- Source: CricInfo, 20 January 2022

Samuel Walusimbi (born 1948) is a former cricketer from Uganda. He was a talented all-rounder, known for his right-handed batting and left-arm medium bowling. He played three One Day Internationals (ODI) in the 1975 cricket World Cup, representing the East Africa cricket team. Walusimbi was one of the founding members of the Wanderers Cricket Club, the second-oldest cricket club in Uganda, won the top flight cricket league in Uganda in 1993, and was part of the Nomads cricket team that toured Kenya and Uganda in 2005. In 2007, he was the coach of the Uganda national cricket team. In 2016, Walusimbi was named the Nile Special-Uganda Sports Press. He was the Coach of Uganda's Under-19 national team, which competed in the 2006 World Cup.

== Personal life ==
Walusimbi has a son called Tendo Mbazzi who also played international cricket for Uganda.Mbazzi was a key figure in Ugandan cricket during the late 1990s and early 2000s.

== Career ==
Cricket Career

He featured on National Team that represented East Africa in the cricket World Cup in 1975 and is believed to be Uganda's best cricketer if all times.

He took part in the One Day Internationals.

After retirement he became a coach of the Uganda Cricket National Team

== See also ==
- Robinson Obuya
- Patrick Ochan (cricketer)
- Faruk Ochimi
- Richard Okia
- Joel Olwenyi
- Martin Ondeko
- Raymond Otim
