= John Nagenda =

Ugandan writer and political advisor (1938–2023)

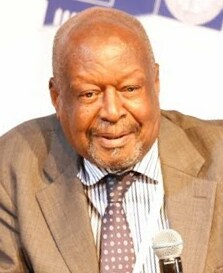
- Nagenda in 2019

Personal information
- Full name: John Mwesigwa Robin Nagenda
- Born: 25 April 1938; Gahim, Ruanda-Urundi (now Rwanda)
- Died: 4 March 2023 (aged 84); Kampala, Uganda
- Batting: Right-handed
- Bowling: Right-arm fast-medium

International information
- National side: East Africa
- Only ODI (cap 6): 7 June 1975 v New Zealand

Career statistics
Competition	ODI	FC
Matches	1	1
Runs scored	–	5
Batting average	–	–
100s/50s	–	–
Top score	–	5*
Balls bowled	54	126
Wickets	1	3
Bowling average	50.00	30.33
5 wickets in innings	0	0
10 wickets in match	0	0
Best bowling	1/50	2/17
Catches/stumpings	0/–	1/–
- Source: CricInfo, 20 January 2022

John Mwesigwa Robin Nagenda (25 April 1938 – 4 March 2023) was a Ugandan writer, political figure, and sportsman. In the 1960s, he pioneered post-colonial English literature in East Africa. He lived in exile in the United Kingdom in the 1970s and 1980s before returning to Uganda in 1986. He subsequently became a senior advisor to President Yoweri Museveni and a prominent newspaper columnist. He represented East Africa at the 1975 Cricket World Cup and was later president of the Uganda Cricket Association.

== Early life ==
Nagenda was born on 25 April 1938 in what is now Rwanda. He was the oldest of six surviving children born to William Kyanjo Nagenda and Sala Maliamu Bakaluba. His parents were Christian missionaries, and the family returned to Uganda when he was a small child. His father's family belongs to the Mmamba clan of the Kingdom of Buganda; his grandfather Festo Mukasa Manyangenda was a significant landowner and served as a co-regent under Mutesa II of Buganda. He is also a first cousin of prime minister Apolo Nsibambi on his mother's side.

Nagenda began his education at Kiwanda School in Namutamba, where his family's tea estate was located. He went on to attend King's College Budo before being sent to board at Kigezi High School for two years.

== Sporting career ==
Nagenda played international cricket for Uganda and East Africa as a right-arm fast-medium bowler. He and batsman Sam Walusimbi were the only Ugandans selected in East Africa's squad for the inaugural 1975 Cricket World Cup in England. He opened the bowling for East Africa in its opening game against New Zealand, taking figures of 1/50, but did not play any further matches in the tournament. He also appeared in one first-class cricket match for East Africa against the Sri Lankans in England in 1975.

After the end of his playing career, Nagenda served as chairman of the Uganda Cricket Association and played a key role in the development of the Kyambogo Cricket Oval.

== Writing ==
Nagenda was among the first students in the literature program at Makerere University and edited the student journal Penpoint. He was a key member of the "Makerere School", which emerged from the university, along with David Rubadiri and Ngũgĩ wa Thiong'o. His early poems and stories appeared primarily in Penpoint and the literary journal Transition, with his poem "Gahini Lake" and short story "And This, At Last" included in the Makerere anthology Origin East Africa published in 1965. According to Simon Gikandi, Nagenda was "one of the pioneers of writing in East Africa" and wrote "at the transitional moment in East African literature in English", when local writers raised in the colonial period sought to apply British forms of prose and poetry to the East African landscape.

Nagenda lived in exile in the United Kingdom during the 1970s and 1980s following the 1971 Ugandan coup d'état. He returned to the country in 1986 when Yoweri Museveni became president. In the same year, he published his first novel, The Seasons of Thomas Tebo, which involves "an idealistic man who becomes involved in politics only to be caught in the horror and violence of a corrupt polity". Nagenda later became a long-running columnist for the New Vision, a daily newspaper in Kampala. His column "One Man's Week" ran for over 25 years, and a compilation of his articles was published in 2019 under the title One Man's Week: Unreserved Wisdom.

== Politics ==
In the 1980s, Nagenda became a member of the external wing of the National Resistance Movement (NRM), which supported Yoweri Museveni. He was on the NRM's steering committee in Kenya and played a key role in convincing King Muwenda Mutebi II of Buganda to return from exile to support the movement. He accompanied Mutebi from London to Rwanda's capital Kigali, from whence they were smuggled into Uganda and met with Museveni and representatives of the National Resistance Army.

Nagenda returned to Uganda in 1986 following the Battle of Kampala and Museveni's ascension to the presidency. In the same year, he was appointed to the Commission of Inquiry into Violations of Human Rights (commonly known as the Ugandan Truth Commission), with a mandate to investigate human rights violations under Museveni's predecessors Idi Amin and Milton Obote. Nagenda came to public attention for his tough interrogation of Obote's vice-president Paulo Muwanga, who attacked Nagenda with ethnic jibes related to his birth in Rwanda. The commission ultimately delivered its report in 1994 but was hampered by a lack of funding and government support for the process.

In 1989, Nagenda was appointed by Museveni as a senior presidential advisor on media and public relations, a position he would hold until his death in 2023. During the 1996 Ugandan presidential election, he engineered the government's campaign against opposition leader Paul Ssemogere, portraying him as a front for deposed president Milton Obote. Nagenda had a complicated working relationship with Museveni, making public criticisms of him on several occasions. In 2010, he condemned the government's seizure of Olive Kobusingye's book The Correct Line? Uganda Under Museveni. He reportedly fell out with Museveni in 2011 as a result of the United States diplomatic cables leak, when he was found to have described Museveni as "quite intemperate" and his wife Janet Museveni as "a very extreme woman". However, Nagenda and Museveni later reconciled, and in 2020 he stated that Museveni had "done a fantastic job" as president.

== Personal life ==
Nagenda died at Medipal International Hospital in Kampala on 4 March 2023. He was 84.
