= Malcolm Ronaldson =

South African cricketer

Personal information
- Full name: Malcolm Bruce Ronaldson
- Born: 13 April 1917; East London, Cape Province, South Africa
- Died: 2 December 2004 (aged 87); Oxford, Oxfordshire, England
- Batting: Right-handed
- Role: Batsman

Domestic team information
- Years: Team
- 1937/38: Eastern Province
- FC debut: 1 January 1938 Eastern Province v Border
- Last FC: 25 March 1938 Eastern Province v Transvaal

Career statistics
Competition	First-class
Matches	5
Runs scored	242
Batting average	26.88
100s/50s	0/2
Top score	94
Catches/stumpings	1/–
- Source: CricketArchive, 18 August 2008

Malcolm Bruce Ronaldson (13 April 1917 – 2 December 2004) was a South African cricketer. A right-handed batsman, he played first-class cricket for Eastern Province in 1938 and later played for Tanganyika and East Africa in the 1950s.

== Biography ==
Born in East London in 1917, Bruce Ronaldson played five matches for Eastern Province in the 1937/38 Currie Cup, his first coming against Border and his last coming against Transvaal. Opening the batting, often without gloves, his highest score of 94 came in the match against Western Province.

World War II prevented him from playing first-class cricket again, but he played for, and captained Tanganyika throughout the 1950s. Most of his matches were against Uganda, with one match each against Kenya and the MCC. He also played twice for East Africa - against Sunder Cricket Club in 1957 and against a South African Non-Europeans team captained by Basil D'Oliveira in 1958.

Ronaldson worked for the British Colonial Service as a District Commissioner for fifteen years and, while at Mbulu, trained Tanzanian runner John Stephen Akhwari, who was favourite for the marathon at the 1968 Olympic Games in Mexico City. Akhwari is notable for his honourable last place finish. He fell early in the race, cutting his knee and dislocating the joint but went on to complete the race, stating to journalists, "My country did not send me 10,000 miles just to start the race; they sent me to finish the race." Eighteen other competitors did not finish the race.

Ronaldson moved to the United Kingdom in 1962 and spent 20 years as company secretary of Oxfam. He died in Oxford in 2004, aged 87. His son Chris Ronaldson was world champion in real tennis, winning the first ever grand slam in 1984.
