= Shiraz Sumar =

Tanzanian cricketer (born 1950)

Personal information
- Born: 1950 (age 75–76); Tanzania
- Batting: Right-handed

International information
- National side: East Africa
- Only ODI (cap 9): 7 June, 1975 v New Zealand
- Source: CricInfo, 20 January 2022

Shiraz Sumar (born 1950) was a Tanzanian cricketer. He played one One day International representing East Africa in the 1975 World Cup.
