= Praful Mehta =

Tanzanian cricketer (born 1938)

Personal information
- Full name: Praful Shantilal Mehta
- Born: 1938 (age 87–88); Dar-es-Salaam, Tanzania
- Batting: Left-handed
- Bowling: Wicket-keeper

International information
- National side: East Africa
- Only ODI (cap 12): 11 June, 1975 v India
- Source: Cricket Archive, 20 January 2022

Praful Shantilal Mehta (born 1938) was a Tanzanian cricketer. He played one One day International representing East Africa in the 1975 World Cup.

He was a wicket-keeper and aggressive batsman who played locally for the Upanga Sports Club. They won the 1970 championship where Mehta had a season average of 52, including an unbeaten century against the Cooper Motors team.

Praful Mehta was Captain of Tanzania Cricket Team from 1970 to end of 1973.

Praful Mehta played for Tanzania Cricket Team which participated in The Inter Territorial Quadrangular Cricket Cup Tournament Championship played in Nairobi, Kenya in 1968 made highest runs for Tanzania Cricket Team, Scored 96 runs against Uganda Cricket Team, 88 runs against Kenya Cricket Team and 45 runs against Zambia Cricket Team.

Tanzania Cricket Team for the first time won The Inter Territorial Quadrangular Cricket Tournament Championship in Nairobi, Kenya in 1968.

Praful Mehta of Tanzania Cricket Team Scored 55 runs not out against M.C.C. Cricket Team from England in three days test cricket match played at Daressalaam Gymkhana Cricket Ground Daressalaam, Tanzania in January,1974. Captain of M.C.C.Cricket Team was Mr. Mike Brearley who latter became Captain of England Cricket Team. The result of test match was draw.

Praful Mehta Played twice for East Africa .Cricket Team which toured England Twice. First in 1972 when East Africa Cricket Team toured England to play Cricket against all the English County Cricket Clubs in England in June, July 1972.

Praful Mehta second time toured England in 1975 with East Africa Cricket Team which toured England to participate to play in First Prudential World Cricket Cup Tournament Championship held in England in June, 1975.
