= Ramesh Sethi =

Kenyan cricketer (born 1941)

Personal information
- Full name: Ramesh Kumar Sethi
- Born: 4 September 1941 (age 85); Kenya
- Batting: Right-handed
- Bowling: Right-arm medium

International information
- National side: East Africa
- ODI debut (cap 8): 7 June, 1975 v New Zealand
- Last ODI: 14 June, 1975 v England
- Source: CricInfo, 20 January 2022

Ramesh Kumar Sethi (born 4 September 1941) is a former Kenyan cricketer who represented East Africa in one first-class match and three One-Day Internationals in the 1975 World Cup.

He was born in Nakuru and received his education at Menengai High School and Nairobi Teacher Training College. Before immigrating to the UK, he established himself as a prominent teacher in Nakuru.

He was in the combined East African team for every match the team played in the World Cup. Sethi was primarily selected as an all rounder. However, in the three matches that he played he took only one wicket, in his debut against New Zealand. His figures were 1 for 51. Sethi ended up as top-scorer for East Africa in their last ODI against England, scoring 30 runs.

Although his first-class and international career lasted for only one year, Sethi continued to play Minor Counties cricket with Shropshire from 1976 to 1981; his best season was 1977 when he took 28 wickets in 7 matches. He was employed as the cricket professional at Ellesmere College, Shropshire, between 1976 and 1988; and then moved to the same position at Harrow School, London. He retired in 2006, but continues to coach part-time at the school.
