= Hamish McLeod =

East African cricketer

Cricket information
- Batting: Left-handed

International information
- National side: East Africa
- ODI debut (cap 4): 7 June, 1975 v New Zealand
- Last ODI: 14 June, 1975 v England
- Source: CricInfo, 20 January 2022

Hamish McLeod is a former Zambian cricketer, who played for East Africa in the 1975 Cricket World Cup.

== Career ==
A wicket-keeper, McLeod appeared in two One Day Internationals, against New Zealand and England, scoring five and naught respectively and taking no catches or completing any stumpings.

During Glamorgan's 1972–73 tour of Zambia, McLeod played a three-day match for Zambia against Glamorgan and a two-day match for Glamorgan against an invitational side.
