= Don Pringle =

East African cricketer

Donald Pringle
Personal information
- Full name: Donald James Pringle
- Born: 1 May 1932; Prestwich, Lancashire, England
- Died: 4 October 1975 (aged 43) near Nairobi, Kenya
- Batting: Right-handed
- Bowling: Right-arm medium
- Role: Opening bowler
- Relatives: Derek Pringle (son)

International information
- National side: East Africa
- ODI debut (cap 13): 11 June, 1975 v India
- Last ODI: 14 June, 1975 v England

Career statistics
Competition	ODI
Matches	2
Runs scored	5
Batting average	2.50
100s/50s	0/0
Top score	3
Balls bowled	90
Wickets	0
Bowling average	–
5 wickets in innings	–
10 wickets in match	–
Best bowling	–
Catches/stumpings	0/–
- Source: CricInfo, 20 January 2022

Donald James Pringle (1 May 1932 – 4 October 1975) was a British landscaper and a Kenyan international cricketer who represented East Africa at the 1975 Cricket World Cup. He was born in England and moved to Kenya in the late 1950s. His son Derek Pringle played international cricket for England.

== Personal life ==
Pringle was born on 1 May 1932 in Prestwich, Lancashire, England. He had two children with his wife Dora, whom he married in England. He moved to Kenya in the late 1950s to work as a landscaper, eventually ending up at the Nairobi Parks Department. He laid the first turf for the Nairobi Club Ground.

== Cricket career ==
In England, Pringle played club cricket for Prestwich. After moving to Kenya he played for Nairobi Civil Service, the Nairobi Club, Parklands Sports Club and Limuru. He was an opening bowler.

Pringle's first recorded match for Kenya came against Uganda in December 1958. He represented Kenya and several invitational teams against the Marylebone Cricket Club (MCC) on its 1963-64 tour of East Africa, notably dismissing England players Willie Watson, Colin Milburn and Micky Stewart. In 1967, he scored 52 not out and took 4/99 against India, returning from its unsuccessful tour of England.

At the 1975 Cricket World Cup in England, Pringle opened the bowling in East Africa's matches against India and England, missing the first game against New Zealand due to injury. He failed to take a wicket in either match, both of which were accorded One Day International (ODI) status.

== Death ==
Pringle was killed in a road accident on 4 October 1975, aged 43. He was returning to Nairobi after playing a club cricket match for Limuru against Impala, where he took figures of 6/16. He was the first ODI cricketer to die. Fellow cricketer Harry Shah was due to travel with Pringle on that day, but decided to have one more drink and come in the next car, meaning Shah avoided the same fatal accident.
