= Ossie Dawson =

South African cricketer (1919–2008)

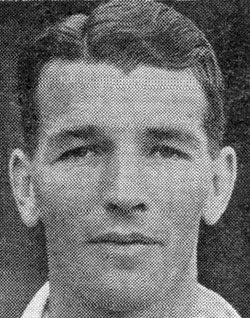

Personal information
- Full name: Oswald Charles Dawson
- Born: 1 September 1919; Durban, Natal, South Africa
- Died: 22 December 2008 (aged 89); Umhlanga, KwaZulu-Natal, South Africa
- Batting: Right-handed
- Bowling: Right-arm medium

International information
- National side: South Africa
- Test debut: 7 June 1947 v England
- Last Test: 5 March 1949 v England

Career statistics
Competition	Test	First-class
Matches	9	75
Runs scored	293	3,804
Batting average	20.92	34.58
100s/50s	0/1	6/20
Top score	55	182
Balls bowled	1,294	9,563
Wickets	10	123
Bowling average	57.79	27.86
5 wickets in innings	0	3
10 wickets in match	0	0
Best bowling	2/57	5/42
Catches/stumpings	10/–	76/–
- Source: CricketArchive, 15 November 2022

Oswald Charles Dawson MC (1 September 1919 – 22 December 2008) was a South African cricketer who played in 9 Test matches, all against England, in the 1947 and 1948–49 series.

Dawson was an all-rounder, an aggressive middle-order batsman and medium-pace bowler, who was an important player for Natal from 1938–39 to 1949–50 and Border from 1951–52 to 1961–62. His highest first-class score was 182, when Border defeated Transvaal by an innings in the Currie Cup in 1952–53. His best bowling figures were 5 for 42, when the South Africans had an innings victory over Warwickshire in 1947.

Dawson also played baseball for Natal. His brother Denis played cricket for Kenya and East Africa.

Before he came to prominence on the cricket field, Dawson had a distinguished record in World War II. He served with the Royal Durban Light Infantry at the Battle of El Alamein and later won a Military Cross in Italy.

Dawson died at his home in Umhlanga, KwaZulu-Natal, in December 2008, aged 89. He and his wife Maureen had five children. Their son Kevin played first-class cricket in South Africa from 1979 to 1987.
