= Parbhu Nana =

Zambian cricketer

Personal information
- Full name: Parbhu Govan Nana
- Born: 17 August 1933; Gujarat, British India
- Batting: Left-handed
- Bowling: Slow left-arm orthodox
- Role: All-rounder

International information
- National side: East Africa
- ODI debut (cap 7): 7 June 1975 v New Zealand
- Last ODI: 14 June 1975 v England
- Source: CricInfo, 20 January 2022

Parbhu Govan Nana (born 17 August 1933, date of death unknown) was an East African cricketer. He was a Zambian of Indian origin.

Nana played three One day Internationals in the 1975 World Cup. Aleft-handed batsman, he was "one of the best left-arm spinners in East and Central Africa".

He died sometime between 2009, when he visited New Zealand, and 2019, when it was reported that he had died "some years ago".
