= Jawahir Shah =

Kenyan cricketer (1942–2019)

Personal information
- Full name: Jawahir Nathoo Shah
- Batting: Right-handed

International information
- National side: East Africa
- ODI debut (cap 3): 7 June, 1975 v New Zealand
- Last ODI: 14 June, 1975 v England
- Source: CricInfo, 20 January 2022

Jawahir Nathoo Shah (9 April 1942 - 15 September 2019) was an East African cricketer. He played three One Day Internationals in the 1975 World Cup. He was Kenya's leading batsman from the mid-1960s for more than a decade and a half. An attractive batsman with a wide range of strokes, he hit 96 and 134 for Kenya against a strong touring India side which featured Bedi and Prasanna in 1967.
