= Zulfiqar Ali (Kenyan cricketer) =

Kenyan cricketer (born 1947)

Personal information
- Born: 1947 (age 78–79); Mombasa, Kenya
- Batting: Right-handed
- Bowling: Right-arm medium

International information
- National side: East Africa
- ODI debut (cap 11): 7 June, 1975 v New Zealand
- Last ODI: 14 June, 1975 v England

Career statistics
Competition	ODIs
Matches	3
Runs scored	39
Batting average	19.50
100s/50s	0/0
Top score	30
Balls bowled	210
Wickets	4
Bowling average	41.50
5 wickets in innings	0
10 wickets in match	0
Best bowling	3/63
Catches/stumpings	1/–
- Source: Cricinfo, 20 January 2022

Zulfiqar Ali (born 1947) was a Kenyan cricketer who played three ODIs for East Africa. In his third match, against England, he took three wickets for 63 runs, the best figures by any East African bowler.
