= Yunus Badat =

Zambian cricketer (born 1943)

Personal information
- Born: 1943 (age 82–83); Rhodesia
- Batting: Right-handed

International information
- National side: East Africa
- ODI debut (cap 14): 11 June, 1975 v India
- Last ODI: 14 June, 1975 v England

Career statistics
Competition	ODIs
Matches	2
Runs scored	1
Batting average	0.50
100s/50s	0/0
Top score	1
Catches/stumpings	0/–
- Source: CricInfo, 20 January 2022

Yunus Badat (born 1943, Northern Rhodesia) was a Zambian cricketer. He played two One day Internationals representing East Africa in the 1975 World Cup. He scored only one run in all and did not bowl in either match.
