= Frasat Ali =

Pakistani cricketer (1949–2022)

Frasat Ali Mughal
Personal information
- Full name: Frasat Ali Mughal
- Born: 31 July 1949; Lahore, Punjab, Dominion of Pakistan
- Died: 13 October 2022 (aged 73)
- Batting: Right-handed
- Bowling: Right-arm medium

International information
- National side: East Africa
- ODI debut (cap 1): 7 June 1975 v New Zealand
- Last ODI: 14 June 1975 v England

Career statistics
Competition	ODIs
Matches	3
Runs scored	57
Batting average	19.00
100s/50s	0/0
Top score	45
Balls bowled	144
Wickets	0
Bowling average	–
5 wickets in innings	–
10 wickets in match	–
Best bowling	–
Catches/stumpings	0/0
- Source: CricInfo, 20 January 2022

Frasat Ali Mughal (31 July 1949 – 13 October 2022) was a Pakistani-born cricketing all-rounder from Kenya who played for the East African cricket team. He played in East Africa's inaugural One Day International against New Zealand, their first match of the 1975 World Cup. In that match, he made a score of 45, the highest ever by anybody from the East African cricket team. He played in all three of East Africa's matches in the World Cup, but did not take any wickets with his medium pacers.

He died on 13 October 2022.

Frasat Ali was the first player to open both the batting and the bowling in a One Day International, when he did it in the World Cup match against New Zealand.
