= Harilal Shah =

East African cricketer (1943–2014)

Harry Shah
Personal information
- Full name: Harilal Raishi Shah
- Born: 14 February 1943; Nairobi, Kenya Colony
- Died: 11 June 2014 (aged 72); Nairobi, Kenya
- Batting: Right-handed
- Bowling: Right-arm medium
- Role: Batsman

International information
- National side: East Africa
- ODI debut (cap 2): 7 June 1975 v New Zealand
- Last ODI: 14 June 1975 v England

Career statistics
Competition	ODI	First-class
Matches	3	1
Runs scored	6	92
Batting average	2.00	46.00
100s/50s	0/0	0/1
Top score	6	59
Catches/stumpings	0/–	0/–
- Source: Cricinfo, 20 January 2022

Harilal Raishi Shah (14 April 1943 – 11 June 2014) was an East African cricketer from Nairobi, Kenya. He played three One Day Internationals in the 1975 World Cup.

== Biography ==
Shah, known as "Harry" by colleagues, was a tall Indian Kenyan who played as a middle-order batsman.

In his three ODI innings at the 1975 Cricket World Cup he scored 6 runs only. He scored ducks in his first two games against New Zealand and India before making 6 against England. After the world cup he played a first-class game against Sri Lanka in Taunton after both teams were eliminated from the world cup. In it he scored hitting 59 and 33. Sri Lanka's performance in that match was judged with its application to play test match cricket, however they were bowled out on the first day and had a first innings deficit to the East Africans. That evening the Sri Lankan's were informed they were not ready for test cricket yet. Shah cite this moment as his most memorable moment in his playing career. The Sri Lankans still won the match by 115 runs. Shortly after returning to Kenya after the world cup he was due to travel to a match on 4 October 1975 in a car with fellow cricketer Don Pringle, but Shah decided to have one more drink and come in the next car. Pringle was killed in a road accident on that day, meaning Shah avoided the same fatal accident.

Shah was involved as an administrator of the game after his retirement from play. He was the chairman of the 1994 ICC Trophy which was hosted in Kenya. He then managed the Kenyan national side including during the 1999 World Cup in England and subsequently became their chief of selectors.

He died on 11 June 2014.
