= East Africa cricket team =

Multi-national group of players of the bat-and-ball game

East Africa
Team information
- Established: 1951
- Last match: v Kenya at Tamworth, England; 27 June 1986

International Cricket Council
- ICC status: Former member (1966–1989)
- ICC region: Africa

One Day Internationals
- First ODI: v New Zealand at Edgbaston, Birmingham; 7 June 1975
- Last ODI: v England at Edgbaston, Birmingham; 14 June 1975
ODIs	Played	Won/Lost
Total	3	0/3
- World Cup appearances: 1 (first in 1975)
- Best result: Group stage
- As of 2 January 2019

The East Africa cricket team was a multi-national cricket team representing the countries of Uganda, Kenya, Tanzania and Zambia. Their first game was against Rhodesia in 1951. East Africa appeared in the 1975 World Cup and the 1979, 1982 and 1986 ICC Trophies. In the last two of these Kenya was represented in its own right, so that East Africa was effectively a Ugandan, Tanzanian and Zambian team.

East Africa was an associate member of the ICC from 1966 to 1989, after which its place was taken by East and Central Africa.

== History ==
Cricket in the area began following British colonisation in the late nineteenth century. Most games were played on an 'officials vs settlers' basis initially, with no inter-territorial games being played. After the influx of Indian labourers into Africa to build the region's railway network the popularity of cricket expanded and by the end of World War II was one of the most played sports in the area. Consequently, the East Africa Cricket Conference was founded in 1951 as the governing body for cricket in the region. It administered the inter-colonial matches between its initial three member countries of Kenya, Uganda, Tanganyika. Later that year a combined team of the East African countries hosted a tour by the Rhodesian cricket team.

East Africa's next recorded match was in 1956 against a visiting Pakistani XI. Under the captaincy of Denis Dawson (brother of South African test player Ossie Dawson) the East Africans were defeated in a 3-day match by 8 wickets. The next year in a match against the touring Sunder Cricket Club the East Africans were defeated by 9 wickets. In 1958 a South African team of non-European players toured the region and played one match against East Africa in Nairobi. This time captained by Malcolm Ronaldson, a former first-class player for Eastern Province, East Africa was beaten in the three day match by the South African Non-Europeans by 7 wickets.

East Africa played several touring teams in the 1960s. In 1962 they played two games against the Commonwealth XI cricket team. In the first in Nairobi (10 to 12 February 1962) the East Africans were beaten by 20 runs. The match was best remembered by a fast paced unbeaten century by Basil D'Oliviera in the Commonwealth team's second innings. In the second match in October, also in Nairobi, the Commonwealth team beat East Africa by 118 runs. The Marylebone Cricket Club (MCC) toured in 1963/4 playing three games in Uganda, one in Tanganyika and seven in Kenya. One of the games was against the East African team in Kampala where the MCC won by an innings and 71 runs. In August 1967 India toured and played one 3-day first-class match. India won by 8 wickets. An International XI of English first-class players visited in 1968 and played a 3-day match against East Africa in Nairobi. The match was drawn.

East Africa toured England in June and July 1972, playing 18 matches against domestic teams, including a six-wicket victory against North Wales. None of the matches had first-class status. The MCC toured East Africa again in 1973/74. In December 1973 they played two matches in Zambia followed by two more in Tanzania then four in Kenya. Their one match against the full East African team, which had first-class status, resulted in a 237-run victory for the MCC.

East Africa were invited to participate in the inaugural Cricket World Cup in 1975. Before the tournament began the teams participation was in doubt after Tanzania threatened to withhold players from touring England in protest of the British & Irish Lions rugby team touring Apartheid South Africa in 1974. The inclusion of East Africa was seen as an important feature of the world cup due to a team from Africa being seen as necessary to signify the tournament as truly worldwide. The two strongest cricketing nations in Africa, South Africa and Rhodesia, selected players based on race and were excluded as part of a sporting boycott resulting in East Africa representing the continent. There were three notable omissions from the East African squad when it was announced, Basher Hassan, Dudley Owen-Thomas and John Solanky. All three were first-class cricketers playing county cricket in England but were born in East Africa (Solanky's first-class debut was for East Africa against the MCC in 1963/64 before emigrating to the UK). The selectors made a point of picking a squad that was currently living and playing in East Africa. The team played several warm up games against Somerset, Wales and Glamorgan. Their only victory was a three wicket win over Glamorgan on 5 June 1975, two days before their first match of the world cup. The team struggled and lost all three of their matches against New Zealand, India and England.

In 1978 the Minor Counties Cricket Association toured Kenya with seven matches there, two of which were against East Africa. The first was a 60 over match where the Minor Counties won by 8 wickets. A scheduled 3-day match was abandoned without any play.

Kenya broke away from the East Africa team in 1981 to join the ICC as an associate member in their own right. In 1989, East Africa was reconfigured as East and Central Africa (representing Uganda, Tanzania, Zambia, and Malawi).

== Tournament history ==
=== World Cup ===
- 1975: First round
- 1979 to 1987: Did not qualify
- 1992 onwards: See East and Central Africa cricket team

=== ICC Trophy ===
- 1979: First round
- 1982: First round
- 1986: First round
- 1990 onwards: See East and Central Africa cricket team

== Records ==
=== One Day Internationals ===
- Highest team total: 128/8 (60.0) vs. New Zealand, 7 June 1975
- Highest individual score: 45 (123), Frasat Ali vs. New Zealand, 7 June 1975
- Best innings bowling: 3/63 (12.0), Zulfiqar Ali vs. England, 14 June 1975

ODI records versus other nations
Opposition	M	W	L	Tie	NR	Win%
England	1	0	1	0	0	0.00%
India	1	0	1	0	0	0.00%
New Zealand	1	0	1	0	0	0.00%

== See also ==
- East and Central Africa Cricket Conference
- List of East Africa ODI cricketers
- List of East Africa cricket captains
- East African cricket team in England in 1972
- East African cricket team in England in 1975
- East Africa rugby union team
- Tanzania national cricket team
- Uganda national cricket team
- 2024 ICC Men's T20 World Cup
