= List of Northamptonshire County Cricket Club seasons =

This is a list of seasons played by Northamptonshire County Cricket Club in English cricket, from the club's formation to the most recent completed season. It details the club's achievements in major competitions, and the top run-scorers and wicket-takers for each season.

== Seasons ==
Season	County Championship									One Day League^{[A]}									RL50^{[B]}	B&H^{[C]}	T20^{[D]}	Most runs^{[E]}		Most wickets^{[E]}		Notes
Season	Div^{[F]}	P	W	L	D	Tie	Abdn	Pts	Pos	Div^{[G]}	P	W	L	NR	Tie	Abdn	Pts	Pos	RL50^{[B]}	B&H^{[C]}	T20^{[D]}	Most runs^{[E]}		Most wickets^{[E]}		Notes
1905		12	2	8	2	0	0		13th													(England) Charles Pool	664	(England) George Thompson	75	
1906		16	4	10	4	0	0		12th													(England) Charles Pool	731	(England) George Thompson	105	
1907		20	2	12	6	0	0		15th													(England) Charles Pool	708	(England) George Thompson	115	
1908		22	3	14	5	0	1	14	15th													(England) Billy Kingston	959	(England) George Thompson	72	
1909		18	9	8	1	0	0	1	7th													(Cricket West Indies) Sydney Smith	833	(England) George Thompson	118	
1910		20	7	8	4	0	0	7	9th													(Cricket West Indies) Sydney Smith	1,228	(England) George Thompson	109	
1911		18	8	9	0	0	0	40	10th													(England) Robert Haywood	863	(England) George Thompson	96	
1912		18	10	1	6	0	0	60	2nd													(England) Tubby Vials	650	(England) George Thompson	106	
1913		22	12	3	4	0	0	110	4th													(England) Robert Haywood	1,433	(England) George Thompson	138	
1914		22	7	6	8	0	1	51	9th													(Cricket West Indies) Sydney Smith	1,193	(Cricket West Indies) Sydney Smith	99	
No competitive cricket was played between 1915 and 1918 due to the First World War.
1919		12	2	4	6	0	0	2	12th													(England) Robert Haywood	707	(England) Claud Woolley	44	
1920		20	3	16	1	0	0	15	14th													(England) Robert Haywood	987	(England) John Murdin	72	
1921		24	5	15	3	0	0	27	13th													(England) Robert Haywood	1,887	(England) John Murdin	77	
1922		22	5	14	2	0	0	25	15th													(England) Claud Woolley	1,221	(England) John Murdin	91	
1923		22	2	16	4	0	0	12	17th													(England) Claud Woolley	1,331	(Wales) Albert Thomas	83	
1924		22	2	9	6	0	0	16	16th													(England) Vallance Jupp	801	(Wales) Albert Thomas	62	
1925		24	9	12	3	0	0	48	11th													(England) Claud Woolley	1,247	(England) Vallance Jupp	110	
1926		26	3	13	9	0	1	32	16th													(England) Vallance Jupp	1,422	(England) Edward Clark	111	
1927		26	4	12	7	0	1	59	16th													(England) Vallance Jupp	1,146	(England) Vallance Jupp	91	
1928		29	7	13	8	0	0	86	13th													(England) Claud Woolley	1,554	(England) Vallance Jupp	122	
1929		28	7	13	8	0	0	84	13th													(England) Fred Bakewell	1,485	(England) Edward Clark	135	
1930		28	4	12	8	0	2	78	17th													(England) Fred Bakewell	1,617	(England) Vallance Jupp	85	
1931		28	2	13	12	0	0	76	17th													(England) John Timms	1,454	(England) Vallance Jupp	100	
1932		28	3	15	8	0	0	83	16th													(England) Vallance Jupp	1,539	(England) Vallance Jupp	106	
1933		24	5	11	8	0	0	109	13th													(England) Fred Bakewell	1,925	(England) Vallance Jupp	88	
1934		24	2	17	5	0	0	51	17th													(England) John Timms	1,474	(England) Reg Partridge	80	
1935		24	1	16	6	0	0	44	17th													(England) Fred Bakewell	1,693	(England) Edward Clark	75	
1936		24	0	9	14	0	0	61	17th													(England) Fred Bakewell	1,446	(England) Austin Matthews	83	
1937		24	0	16	7	0	0	33	17th													(England) John Timms	1,386	(England) Reg Partridge	76	
1938		24	0	14	10	0	0	16	17th													(England) Dennis Brookes	1,227	(England) Reg Partridge	88	
1939		24	1	8	13	0	0	36	16th													(England) John Timms	1,348	(New Zealand) Bill Merritt	72	
No competitive cricket was played between 1940 and 1945 due to the Second World War.
1946		26	2	9	13	0	0	64	16th													(England) Dennis Brookes	1,932	(England) Edward Clark	64	
1947		26	2	14	8	1	0	54	17th													(England) Dennis Brookes	1,657	(Cricket West Indies) Bertie Clarke	83	
1948		26	3	8	15	0	0	52	17th													(England) Dennis Brookes	1,717	(England) Vincent Broderick	92	
1949		26	10	5	11	0	0	140	6th													(England) Buddy Oldfield	2,114	(England) Freddie Brown	93	
1950		28	6	4	15	0	0	104	10th													(Australia) Jock Livingston	1,805	(England) Gordon Garlick	84	
1951		28	4	4	17	0	0	80	13th													(England) Frederick Jakeman	1,819	(England) Albert Nutter	86	
1952		28	7	8	12	0	0	128	8th													(England) Dennis Brookes	1,991	(Australia) George Tribe	116	
1953		28	6	3	15	1	0	114	11th													(Australia) Jock Livingston	1,564	(England) Robert Clarke	92	
1954		28	9	9	9	0	0	136	8th													(Australia) Jock Livingston	1,912	(Australia) George Tribe	133	
1955		28	9	10	9	0	0	148	7th													(Australia) Jock Livingston	1,957	(Australia) George Tribe	169	
1956		28	8	5	15	0	0	148	4th													(Australia) Jock Livingston	1,846	(Australia) George Tribe	122	
1957		28	15	2	10	0	0	218	2nd													(England) Dennis Brookes	1,428	(Australia) George Tribe	124	
1958		28	11	6	6	0	0	160	4th													(England) Raman Subba Row	1,482	(Australia) George Tribe	107	
1959		28	8	10	10	0	0	146	11th													(England) Raman Subba Row	1,656	(Australia) George Tribe	116	
1960		28	8	6	13	0	0	126	9th													(England) Michael Norman	1,606	(England) Michael Allen	83	
1961		28	5	13	10	0	0	82	16th													(England) Michael Norman	1,563	(England) David Larter	70	
1962		28	7	5	16	0	0	128	8th													(England) Albert Lightfoot	1,764	(England) David Larter	84	
1963		28	9	8	11	0	0	105	7th										SF			(England) Michael Norman	1,740	(England) David Larter	110	
1964		28	12	4	11	0	0	130	3rd										QF			(England) Roger Prideaux	1,637	(England) Malcolm Scott	104	
1965		28	13	4	9	0	0	140	2nd										QF			(England) Jim Watts	1,166	(England) Brian Crump	112	
1966		28	10	9	9	0	0	130	5th										R1			(England) Roger Prideaux	1,670	(England) Haydn Sully	97	
1967		28	7	8	11	0	0	118	9th										QF			(England) Colin Milburn	1,368	(England) Haydn Sully	76	
1968		28	5	6	17	0	0	170	13th										QF			(England) Roger Prideaux	1,679	(England) Brian Crump	74	
1969		24	5	7	12	0	0	163	9th		16	5	9	1	0	1	22	14th	R1			(Pakistan) Mushtaq Mohammad	1,487	(Pakistan) Mushtaq Mohammad	68	
1970		24	4	6	14	0	0	174	14th		16	6	10	0	0	0	24	13th	R2			(England) Roger Prideaux	1,641	(England) Dennis Breakwell	64	
1971		24	4	8	12	0	0	159	14th		16	6	10	0	0	0	24	14th	R1			(England) David Steele	1,444	(England) Peter Lee	46	
1972		20	7	3	10	0	0	181	4th		16	5	8	0	1	2	24	14th	R1	Grp		(Pakistan) Mushtaq Mohammad	1,743	(England) John Dye	75	
1973		20	8	4	8	0	0	208	3rd		16	4	9	1	0	2	19	17th	R1	Grp		(England) David Steele	1,213	(India) Bishan Bedi	86	
1974		20	9	2	9	0	0	203	3rd		16	10	6	0	0	0	40	5th	R2	Grp		(England) Roy Virgin	1,845	(England) John Dye	67	
1975		20	7	9	4	0	0	182	8th		16	5	11	0	0	0	20	16th	R2	Grp		(Pakistan) Mushtaq Mohammad	1,338	(Pakistan) Sarfraz Nawaz	94	
1976		20	9	3	8	0	0	218	2nd		16	7	9	0	0	0	28	14th	W	Grp		(Pakistan) Mushtaq Mohammad	1,574	(Pakistan) Sarfraz Nawaz	82	
1977		22	6	6	8	0	2	183	9th		16	4	10	1	0	1	20	17th	QF	SF		(Pakistan) Mushtaq Mohammad	1,432	(Pakistan) Sarfraz Nawaz	73	
1978		22	2	6	12	0	2	121	17th		16	5	8	1	0	2	26	13th	R2	Grp		(England) Wayne Larkins	1,343	(England) Jim Griffiths	49	
1979		22	3	6	12	0	1	153	11th		16	5	9	1	0	1	24	13th	RU	Grp		(England) Allan Lamb	1,614	(England) Peter Willey	46	
1980		22	5	4	13	0	0	148	12th		16	8	7	0	0	1	34	7th	R1	W		(England) Allan Lamb	1,720	(England) Tim Lamb	53	
1981		22	3	6	12	0	1	166	15th		16	4	11	0	0	1	18	17th	RU	Grp		(England) Allan Lamb	1,962	(England) Jim Griffiths	64	
1982		22	5	3	14	0	0	195	9th		16	8	7	1	0	0	34	8th	R2	Grp		(England) Wayne Larkins	1,728	(England) David Steele	67	
1983		24	7	4	13	0	0	252	6th		16	5	10	0	0	1	22	15th	QF	QF		(England) Wayne Larkins	1,739	(England) David Steele	66	
1984		24	5	9	9	0	1	202	11th		16	6	9	1	0	0	26	12th	SF	Grp		(England) Wayne Larkins	1,601	(England) David Steele	60	
1985		24	5	4	15	0	0	183	10th		16	7	4	2	1	2	38	5th	R2	QF		(England) Wayne Larkins	1,490	(Cricket West Indies) Roger Harper	56	
1986		24	5	3	16	0	0	193	9th		16	9	5	1	0	1	40	5th	R1	QF		(England) Rob Bailey	1,562	(Cricket West Indies) Roger Harper	62	
1987		24	7	4	13	0	0	224	7th		16	4	6	2	0	4	28	11th	RU	RU		(England) Wayne Larkins	1,363	(Cricket West Indies) Winston Davis	70	
1988		22	5	7	10	0	0	199	12th		16	4	9	1	0	2	22	15th	R1	Grp		(England) Rob Bailey	1,203	(Cricket West Indies) Winston Davis	73	
1989		22	7	8	7	0	0	222	5th		16	8	6	1	0	1	36	7th	QF	QF		(England) Wayne Larkins	1,419	(Wales) Greg Thomas	66	
1990		22	4	9	9	0	0	185	11th		16	3	12	1	0	0	14	17th	RU	Grp		(England) Rob Bailey	1,965	(Cricket West Indies) Curtly Ambrose	58	
1991		22	5	6	11	0	0	189	10th		16	10	4	1	0	1	44	3rd	SF	QF		(England) Alan Fordham	1,725	(Cricket West Indies) Eldine Baptiste	49	
1992		22	8	4	10	0	0	248	3rd		17	7	9	1	0	0	30	14th	W	Grp		(England) Alan Fordham	1,693	(England) Paul Taylor	68	
1993		17	8	4	5	0	0	222	4th		17	9	5	2	1	0	42	5th	QF	SF		(England) Rob Bailey	1,191	(Zimbabwe) Kevin Curran	67	
1994		17	8	4	5	0	0	209	5th		17	6	9	1	1	0	28	13th	QF	PR		(England) Rob Bailey	1,168	(Cricket West Indies) Curtly Ambrose	77	
1995		17	12	2	3	0	0	290	3rd		17	6	8	2	1	0	30	13th	RU	Grp		(England) Allan Lamb	1,237	(India) Anil Kumble	105	
1996		17	3	8	6	0	0	159	16th		17	10	6	1	0	0	42	6th	R2	RU		(Zimbabwe) Kevin Curran	1,242	(England) Paul Taylor	64	
1997		17	3	5	9	0	0	156	15th		17	8	6	0	0	3	38	9th	R2	SF		(Zimbabwe) Kevin Curran	1,032	(England) Paul Taylor	54	
1998		17	4	5	8	0	0	146	15th		17	6	7	1	1	2	32	13th	R1	Grp		(England) Mal Loye	1,184	(England) Paul Taylor	54	
1999		17	4	7	6	0	0	171	13th	Div 2	16	9	5	0	0	2	40	3rd	QF	n/a^{[H]}		(England) David Sales	1,156	(England) Devon Malcolm	60	
2000	Div 2 ↑	16	7	4	5	0	0	188	1st	Div 1	16	9	7	0	0	0	36	3rd	QF	Grp		(Australia) Matthew Hayden	1,270	(England) Darren Cousins	67	
2001	Div 1 ↓	16	2	5	9	0	0	148	7th	Div 1	16	3	12	0	0	1	14	9th	R4	Grp		(Australia) Mike Hussey	2,055	(England) Darren Cousins	36	
2002	Div 2	16	5	7	4	0	0	162.5	7th	Div 2	16	7	8	0	0	1	30	6th	R4	Grp		(Australia) Mike Hussey	1,379	(England) Carl Greenidge	49	
2003	Div 2 ↑	16	10	2	4	0	0	237	2nd	Div 2	18	12	5	1	0	0	50	2nd	R3		Grp	(Australia) Mike Hussey	1,697	(England) Jason Brown	65	
2004	Div 1 ↓	16	1	4	11	0	0	134	9th	Div 1	16	8	8	0	0	0	32	4th	QF		Grp	(England) Usman Afzaal	1,365	(South Africa) Johann Louw	60	
2005	Div 2	16	5	3	8	0	0	193	4th	Div 1	16	7	7	2	0	0	32	3rd	QF		QF	(Australia) Martin Love	1,345	(England) Jason Brown	55	
2006	Div 2	16	3	5	8	0	0	163	6th	Div 1	8	5	2	0	0	1	11	2nd	Grp		QF	(Australia) Chris Rogers	1,352	(Australia) Matthew Nicholson	46	
2007	Div 2	16	5	5	6	0	0	176	5th	Div 1	8	2	4	0	1	0	6	7th	Grp		Grp	(England) David Sales	1,384	(South Africa) Lance Klusener	33	
2008	Div 2	16	3	3	10	0	0	169	4th	Div 2	8	0	0	6	0	2	2	9th	Grp		QF	(England) David Sales	1,120	(South Africa) JJ van der Wath	43	
2009	Div 2	16	6	4	6	0	0	193	3rd	Div 2	8	3	1	2	1	1	9	4th	Grp		SF	(South Africa) Andrew Hall	1,161	(England) David Lucas	58	
2010	Div 2	16	6	7	3	0	0	167	6th										Grp		QF	(England) Stephen Peters	1,296	(England) Jack Brooks	34	
2011	Div 2	16	7	2	7	0	0	226	3rd										Grp		Grp	(South Africa) Andrew Hall	960	(Sri Lanka) Chaminda Vaas	70	
2012	Div 2	16	2	5	9	0	0	130	8th										Grp		Grp	(England) Stephen Peters	763	(England) David Willey	43	
2013	Div 2 ↑	16	5	3	8	0	0	202	2nd										Grp		W	(South Africa) Andrew Hall	936	(Australia) Trent Copeland	45	
2014	Div 1 ↓	16	0	12	4	0	0	79	9th										Grp		Grp	(England) James Middlebrook	825	(Pakistan) M. Azharullah	46	
2015	Div 2	16	3	3	10	0	0	180	5th										Grp		RU	(England) Alex Wakely	853	(South Africa) Rory Kleinveldt	57	
2016	Div 2	16	4	3	8	0	1	184	5th										QF		W	(England) Ben Duckett	1,338	(England) Ben Sanderson	55	
2017	Div 2	14	9	3	2	0	0	217	3rd										Grp		Grp	(England) Rob Newton	894	(South Africa) Rory Kleinveldt	50	
2018	Div 2	14	4	8	1	0	1	110	9th										Grp		Grp	(South Africa) Ricardo Vasconcelos	608	(England) Ben Sanderson	60	
2019	Div 2 ↑	14	5	2	7	0	0	188	2nd										Grp		Grp	(England) Adam Rossington	787	(England) Ben Sanderson	60	
2020	BWT	5	1	2	2	0	0	49	=12th										NH		QF	(England) Charlie Thurston	357	(England) Jack White	13	
2021	Grp 3/Div 2	14	4	5	5	0	0	165.5	10th										Grp		Grp	(South Africa) Ricardo Vasconcelos	845	(England) Ben Sanderson	43	
2022	Div 1	14	2	5	7	0	0	154	6th										Grp		Grp	(England) Luke Procter	961	(England) Ben Sanderson	41	
2023	Div 1 ↓	14	2	8	4	0	0	96	10th										Grp		Grp	(England) Rob Keogh	780	(England) Jack White	50	
2024	Div 2	14	2	3	9	0	0	161	4th										Grp		QF	(England) Luke Procter	923	(England) Ben Sanderson	41	
2025	Div 2	14	2	6	6	0	0	143	7th										Grp		SF	(England) Saif Zaib	1,425	(England) Calvin Harrison	36	
2026	Div 2	14	5	4	5	0	0	191	3rd										Grp		W	(South Africa) Ricardo Vasconcelos	1,159	(England) Ben Sanderson	58	

== Key ==
Winners	Runners up	Semi-finals	Promoted	Relegated

Division shown in bold when it changes due to promotion, relegation or league reorganisation. Top run scorer/wicket taker shown in bold when he was the leading run scorer/wicket taker in the country.

Key to league record:
Div - division played in
P – games played
W – games won
L – games lost
D – games drawn
NR – games with no result
Abnd – games abandoned
Pts – points
Pos – final position

Key to rounds:
PR - preliminary round
R1 – first round
R2 – second round, etc.
QF – quarter-final
SF – semi-final
Grp – group stage
RU - runners-up
n/a – not applicable

== Notes ==
A. The National League competition did not start until the 1969 season, and ran until 2010. It was replaced, along with the Friends Provident Trophy, by the group format Clydesdale Bank 40.
B. The Friends Provident Trophy competition did not start until the 1963 season, and for the 2010 was replaced by a group format named the Clydesdale Bank 40.
C. The Benson & Hedges Cup competition did not start until the 1972 season, and ran until 2002.
D. The Twenty20 Cup competition did not start until the 2003 season, and for the 2010 season changed to the FP T20.
E. In County Championship matches only.
F. The County Championship was split into two divisions in 2000.
G. The National League was split into two divisions in 1999.
H. Owing to the 1999 Cricket World Cup, the Benson & Hedges Cup was replaced by the Benson & Hedges Super Cup, which featured the top eight teams from the 1998 County Championship. Northamptonshire, finishing 15, did not qualify.
