= History of cricket in Pakistan from 1947 to 1970 =

This article describes the history of cricket in Pakistan from 1947 to 1970.

== Early years: 1947 to 1950 ==
The independent state of Pakistan was established in 1947 following the Partition of India. First-class cricket was already established in the country as many clubs and local associations had previously been part of the Indian cricket scene.

Matches were played on an ad hoc basis in the 1947–48 and 1948–49 seasons before Pakistan's Board of Cricket Control (BCCP) was established on 1 May 1949. Games continued to be few and far between for several seasons until a national championship began in 1953.

=== 1947–48 season ===
On 27–29 December 1947, the Punjab v Sind match at Lahore marked the start of first-class cricket in Pakistan as an independent country. Later that season, on 6–8 February 1948, the Punjab Governor's XI v Punjab University match took place, also at Lahore. These were the only matches that season owing to disruption caused by the Partition.

=== 1948–49 season ===
Another Punjab Governor's XI v Punjab University took place at Lahore in March 1949, but it was the only domestic first-class match in the second season.

The highlight of the 1948–49 season was the arrival of the West Indies team in November 1948. This was the first tour of Pakistan by an overseas team.

The Pakistan national cricket team made its inaugural overseas tour in April 1949 with a visit to Ceylon, where the team played two matches against Ceylon in Colombo. Pakistan, captained by Mohammed Saeed, won the first match by an innings and the second by 10 wickets.

=== 1949–50 season ===
There were no domestic matches at all in 1949–50 when two touring teams arrived. The first tour was by a Commonwealth XI in November and December 1949. Then Ceylon, on a return tour in March–April 1950, played five first-class matches.

== 1951 to 1960 ==
=== Pakistan's debut in Test cricket ===
In October to December 1952, Pakistan's Test debut was a five-match series in India, the matches played at New Delhi, Lucknow, Bombay, Madras and Calcutta. After India had won the First Test by an innings, Pakistan won the Second Test by an innings thanks to Fazal Mahmood who took 5–52 and 7–42. India won the Third Test and the other two were drawn.

== National championships ==
The Qaid-i-Azam Trophy was launched in the 1953–54 season as Pakistan's national championship. The first winner was Bahawalpur. The outstanding player in the inaugural season was the great opening batsman Hanif Mohammad who scored 513 runs at an average of 128.25 with a highest score of 174.

Winners of the Qaid-i-Azam Trophy from 1954 to 1970 were:

- 1953–54 – Bahawalpur
- 1954–55 – Karachi
- 1955–56 – no competition
- 1956–57 – Punjab
- 1957–58 – Bahawalpur
- 1958–59 – Karachi
- 1959–60 – Karachi
- 1960–61 – no competition
- 1961–62 – Karachi Blues
- 1962–63 – Karachi A
- 1963–64 – Karachi Blues
- 1964–65 – Karachi Blues
- 1965–66 – no competition
- 1966–67 – Karachi
- 1967–68 – no competition
- 1968–69 – Lahore
- 1969–70 – PIA

In the 1960–61 season, the BCCP introduced a knockout competition called the Ayub Trophy. Winners to 1970 were:

- 1960–61 – Railways-Quetta
- 1961–62 – Karachi
- 1962–63 – Karachi
- 1964–65 – Karachi
- 1965–66 – Karachi Blues
- 1967–68 – Karachi Blues
- 1969–70 – PIA

== International tours of Pakistan ==
=== West Indies 1948–49 ===
In the first international tour of Pakistan by an overseas team, West Indies played two first-class matches versus Sind at Karachi and a Pakistan XI at Lahore. Both matches were drawn.

The West Indies team included George Headley, Clyde Walcott and Everton Weekes.

See: West Indian cricket team in India, Pakistan and Ceylon in 1948–49

=== Commonwealth XI 1949–50 ===
The tourists played two matches against an All-Pakistan XI in Lahore and against a Karachi-Sind Combined XI in Karachi. The tourists won the first match by an innings and 177 runs; they won the second match by 6 wickets. Captained by Jock Livingston, who also kept wicket in some games, the team had several well-known players including Frank Worrell, George Tribe, Bill Alley, Cec Pepper, George Dawkes and George Pope.

See Commonwealth XI cricket team in India, Pakistan and Ceylon in 1949–50

=== Ceylon 1949–50 ===
Ceylon in March–April 1950 played five first-class matches against: Karachi-Sind at the Karachi Gymkhana Ground; a Pakistan XI at the Bagh-e-Jinnah in Lahore; the Commander-in-Chief's XI at the Pindi Club Ground in Rawalpindi; Pakistan Universities at Punjab University Ground in Lahore; and Pakistan XI again at Karachi's Gymkhana Ground.

See: Ceylonese cricket team in Pakistan in 1949–50

=== MCC 1951–52 ===
Only a handful of domestic matches were played in the next three seasons, during which the highlight was the arrival of the first touring team from England in November 1951. The tour was organised by MCC and the team also visited Ceylon. MCC played four first-class matches in Pakistan versus:

- Punjab at Jinnah Stadium in Sialkot – match drawn
- Pakistan XI at Bagh-e-Jinnah in Lahore – match drawn
- Bahawalpur-Karachi at Bahawal Stadium in Bahawalpur – match drawn
- Pakistan XI at Karachi Gymkhana Ground – Pakistan won by 4 wickets

MCC had a strong team that featured the young Tom Graveney and Brian Statham. Captained by Nigel Howard it also included Derek Shackleton, Jack Robertson, Donald Carr, Roy Tattersall, Frank Lowson, Don Brennan and Dick Spooner.

See: English cricket team in India, Pakistan and Ceylon in 1951–52

=== India 1954–55 ===
Pakistan's inaugural home Test series was against neighbours India and all five matches were drawn:

- 1st Test at Bangabandhu National Stadium, Dhaka, Bangladesh – match drawn
- 2nd Test at Bahawal Stadium, Bahawalpur – match drawn
- 3rd Test at Bagh-e-Jinnah, Lahore – match drawn
- 4th Test at Peshawar Club Ground – match drawn
- 5th Test at National Stadium, Karachi – match drawn

See: Indian cricket team in Pakistan in 1954–55

=== MCC 1955–56 ===
This side was described as MCC "A" and the fixtures against Pakistan were not designated Test Matches.

Jan.20–25, 1956. Venue: Bagh-e-Jinnah, Lahore Result: Match Drawn.
3–8 Feb. 1956. Venue: Bangabandhu National Stadium. Result: Pakistan won by innings and 10 runs.
24–28 Feb. 1956. Venue: Peshawar Club Ground. Result: Pakistan won by 7 wickets.
9–14 March 1956. Venue: Karachi National Stadium. Result: MCC won by 2 wickets.

See: English cricket team in Pakistan in 1955–56

=== New Zealand 1955–56 ===
- 1st Test at National Stadium, Karachi – Pakistan won by an innings and 1 run
- 2nd Test at Bagh-e-Jinnah, Lahore – Pakistan won by 4 wickets
- 3rd Test at Bangabandhu National Stadium, Dhaka, Bangladesh – match drawn

See: New Zealand cricket team in Pakistan in 1955–56

=== Australia 1956–57 ===
- 1st Test at National Stadium, Karachi – Pakistan won by 9 wickets

Fazal Mahmood was Pakistan's matchwinner with 13 wickets.

=== West Indies 1958–59 ===
- 1st Test at National Stadium, Karachi – Pakistan won by 10 wickets
- 2nd Test at Bangabandhu National Stadium, Dhaka, Bangladesh – Pakistan won by 41 runs
- 3rd Test at Bagh-e-Jinnah, Lahore – West Indies won by an innings and 156 runs

=== Australia 1959–60 ===
- 1st Test at Bangabandhu National Stadium, Dhaka, Bangladesh – Australia won by 8 wickets
- 2nd Test at Gaddafi Stadium, Lahore – Australia won by 7 wickets
- 3rd Test at National Stadium, Karachi – match drawn

See: Australian cricket team in Pakistan in 1959–60

The series took place in November and December 1959. In the Second Test, Norm O'Neill scored 134 for Australia and Saeed Ahmed scored 166 for Pakistan. Hanif Mohammed scored 101 in the Third Test for Pakistan.

Richie Benaud was the leading wicket taker of the series with 18.

Australia also played one three-day match against President's XI in Rawalpindi starting 28 November 1959. Australia won this match by 3 wickets.

=== International XI 1961–62 ===
An International XI toured Africa, New Zealand and Asia from February to April 1962, playing one first-class match in Pakistan, against an East Pakistan Governor's XI in Dhaka in March, which was drawn.

=== England 1961–62 ===
- 1st Test at Gaddafi Stadium, Lahore – England won by 5 wickets
- 2nd Test at Bangabandhu National Stadium, Dhaka, Bangladesh – match drawn
- 3rd Test at National Stadium, Karachi – match drawn

=== Commonwealth XI 1963–64 ===
A Commonwealth XI cricket team toured Pakistan in the 1963–64 season, playing six first-class matches including three against the Pakistan national team.

Captained by Peter Richardson, the Commonwealth XI included several well-known players such as Tom Graveney, Rohan Kanhai, Basil Butcher, Seymour Nurse, Bill Alley, Khalid Ibadulla, Charlie Griffith and Keith Andrew.

=== Australia 1964–65 ===
- 1st Test at National Stadium, Karachi – match drawn

The teams played one 5-day Test starting on 24 October 1964 at the National Stadium in Karachi.

The Test (and series) was drawn. Khalid Ibadulla top scored for Pakistan with 166 in the first innings. Australian captain Bob Simpson scored 153 and 115. Graham McKenzie was the top wicket taker with 8 wickets.

=== New Zealand 1964–65 ===
- 1st Test at Pindi Club Ground, Rawalpindi – Pakistan won by an innings and 64 runs
- 2nd Test at Gaddafi Stadium, Lahore – match drawn
- 3rd Test at National Stadium, Karachi – Pakistan won by 8 wickets

See: New Zealand cricket team in Pakistan in 1964–65

=== Ceylon 1966–67 ===
Ceylon toured Pakistan in November 1966 and played five first-class matches, including three against Pakistan. Pakistan won all three matches by large margins.

See: Ceylonese cricket team in Pakistan in 1966–67

=== Marylebone Cricket Club Under-25 1966–67 ===
A Marylebone Cricket Club Under-25 team toured Pakistan in January and February 1967 and played seven first-class matches, including three against the Pakistan Under-25 team.

See: Marylebone Cricket Club Under-25 cricket team in Pakistan in 1966–67

=== Commonwealth XI 1967–68 ===
A Commonwealth XI cricket team toured Pakistan from February to April 1968, playing eight first-class matches. Three matches against Pakistan served as unofficial Tests; Pakistan won the first and the other two were drawn.

Captained by Richie Benaud, the Commonwealth XI included several well-known players such as John Hampshire, Mushtaq Mohammed, Brian Luckhurst, John Murray, David Allen and Keith Boyce.

=== International XI 1967–68 ===
An International XI of county cricketers, most of them English, toured Africa and Asia from January to April 1968, playing one first-class match in Pakistan against a BCCP XI in February, which the International XI won.

=== England 1968–69 ===
- 1st Test at Gaddafi Stadium, Lahore – match drawn
- 2nd Test at Bangabandhu National Stadium, Dhaka, Bangladesh – match drawn
- 3rd Test at National Stadium, Karachi – match drawn

See: English cricket team in Ceylon and Pakistan in 1968–69

=== New Zealand 1969–70 ===
This was the first ever series win by New Zealand after almost 40 years and 30 consecutive winless series.

- 1st Test at National Stadium, Karachi – match drawn
- 2nd Test at Gaddafi Stadium, Lahore – New Zealand won by 5 wickets
- 3rd Test at Bangabandhu National Stadium, Dhaka, Bangladesh – match drawn

See: New Zealand cricket team in Pakistan in 1969–70

== Bibliography ==
- Cricket: A History of its Growth and Development throughout the World by Rowland Bowen
- First Class Cricket in Pakistan (5 volumes) by Abid Ali Kazi
- Playfair Cricket Annual
- Wisden Cricketers' Almanack

By Peter Oborne:

- Wounded Tiger: The History of Cricket in Pakistan. Simon and Schuster, 2014. ISBN 978-1-4711-2577-5
- White on Green: Celebrating the Drama of Pakistan Cricket. (Co-written with Richard Heller) Simon and Schuster, 2016. ISBN 978-1-4711-5641-0

== External sources ==
- CricketArchive – List of Tournaments in Pakistan
- Abdul Hafeez Kardar, "Growth of Pakistan Cricket", Wisden 1954
- Ghulam Mustafa Khan, "The Rise of Cricket in Pakistan", Wisden 1967
- Rowland Bowen, "Some Dates in Pakistan Cricket History", Wisden 1967
