= Wellingborough School (cricket ground) =

Cricket ground in Wellingborough, England

Coordinates: 52.2950°N 0.6788°W

The Wellingborough School Ground is a cricket ground which was used by Northamptonshire County Cricket Club in 43 First-class matches for 45 years between 1946 and 1991, and 17 List A games between 1970 and 1991. It is now used predominantly for Women's County Twenty20 Cricket. The Thatched Pavilion which adjoins the ground features, as the last step an incoming batsman takes on the way to the wicket, a paving stone from W. G. Grace's home in Bristol. Murray Witham, a geography teacher at the school, rescued the stone from Grace's home when it was being demolished in the 1930s and brought it to the school.

== Records ==
=== First Class ===
- Highest team total: 523-8d by Yorkshire against Northamptonshire, 1949
- Lowest team total: 62 by Middlesex v Northamptonshire, 1977
- Highest individual score: 269* by L Hutton for Yorkshire against Northamptonshire, 1949
- Highest partnership: 208* by D Brookes and N Oldfield for the First wicket in Northamptonshire's innings against Yorkshire, 1949
- Best bowling in an innings: 7–46 by FH Tyson for Northamptonshire against Derbyshire, 1956

=== One Day ===
- Highest team total: 272 by Somerset against Northamptonshire, 1986
- Highest individual score: 175* by IT Botham for Somerset against Northamptonshire, 1986
- Highest partnership: 202 by W Larkins and P Willey for the First wicket in Northamptonshire's innings against Leicestershire, 1979
- Best bowling in an innings: 5–31 by FD Stephenson for Nottinghamshire against Northamptonshire, 1991

== See also ==
- Wellingborough School
- Northamptonshire County Cricket Club
