= Dennis Brookes =

English cricketer

Personal information
- Full name: Dennis Brookes
- Born: 29 October 1915; Leeds, Yorkshire, England
- Died: 9 March 2006 (aged 90); Northampton, Northamptonshire, England
- Batting: Right-handed
- Bowling: Right-arm medium
- Role: Batsman

Domestic team information
- Years: Team
- 1934–1959: Northamptonshire

Career statistics
Competition	Test	First-class
Matches	1	525
Runs scored	17	30,874
Batting average	8.50	36.10
100s/50s	0/0	71/152
Top score	10	257
Balls bowled	–	158
Wickets	–	3
Bowling average	–	42.66
5 wickets in innings	–	0
10 wickets in match	–	0
Best bowling	–	1/7
Catches/stumpings	1/–	205/–
- Source: ESPNcricinfo, 11 July 2009

Dennis Brookes (29 October 1915 – 9 March 2006) was an English cricketer who played for Northamptonshire between 1934 and 1959 (and as captain between 1954 and 1957). He also played in one Test match for England against West Indies in 1948. Brookes was President of Northamptonshire from 1982 to 1984. A cultured and prolific opening batsman, Brookes was the first professional skipper at Northamptonshire, and became both county president and a Justice of the peace.

== Life and career ==
Brookes was born in Kippax, Leeds. He attended Kippax Council School, where he was captain of cricket and football. After being spotted playing club cricket as a teenager, he joined Northamptonshire in 1934, making his debut against Yorkshire in 1934, aged 18. The team at that time was very weak. It failed to win a match for four years from May 1935, and ended at the bottom of the County Championship table for each year from 1934 to 1938, seven years in nine, and second bottom the other two times. Brookes quickly became a regular in the county team, but his career was interrupted by the Second World War, in which he served as a sergeant-instructor in the RAF.

His batting really developed, though, after the war and for the next 10 years he was at, or near the top of, the national batting averages. He was unlucky to play in no more than one Test match, the first Test on the 1947–48 tour of the West Indies. His tour ended prematurely after he chipped a finger bone immediately after the first Test.

Northampton's fortunes revived in 1949, when Freddie Brown became captain of Northamptonshire, and the team finished the season fifth in the County Championship. As senior professional, Brookes frequently stood in for Brown as captain in the early 1950s. Brown retired in 1953, and Brookes took over, the first professional captain of the county. The team included Frank Tyson and Keith Andrew, and Australians Jock Livingston, Jack Manning and George Tribe, and enjoyed a successful period under his leadership, coming seventh in the County Championship in 1954 and 1955, fourth in 1956, and achieving its highest-ever placing, second, in 1957. Brookes was a Wisden Cricketer of the Year in 1957, but he stood down as captain for 1958, replaced by Raman Subba Row, an amateur. He retired from first-class cricket after the 1959 season, but captained the Players against the Gentlemen that year (his only appearance for the Players).

Brookes passed 1,000 runs in a season 17 times, and 2,000 runs six times. His highest score was 267, scored against Gloucestershire in 1949. He made 71 first-class centuries, including one against each of the other 16 counties, and six double centuries. He held many Northamptonshire records, including the most appearances (492), most career runs (28,980), most centuries (67) and most runs in a season (2,198 in 1952).

He was later captain of the Northamptonshire second XI, a coach for Northamptonshire, and a local magistrate. He was president of Northamptonshire from 1982 to 1985.

In 1947, in a match between Northamptonshire and Somerset, Arthur Wellard, was bowling rather well, when Brookes, who was batting, played a false stroke through the slips beating the eccentric Boss Meyer (the founder of Millfield School) as he was too crippled by lumbago to bend down to catch it. Meyer reached into his back pocket and said, "Sorry Arthur, here's a quid."

Brookes died in March 2006, in Northampton, at the age of 90.
