= Des Barrick =

English cricketer

- Barrick in 1954

Personal information
- Full name: Desmond William Barrick
- Born: 28 April 1926; Fitzwilliam, Yorkshire, England
- Died: 25 December 2007 (aged 81); Kellington, North Yorkshire, England
- Batting: Right-handed
- Bowling: Right-arm leg-spin
- Role: Batsman

Domestic team information
- Years: Team
- 1949 to 1960: Northamptonshire

Career statistics
Competition	First-class
Matches	301
Runs scored	13,970
Batting average	32.64
100s/50s	20/67
Top score	211
Balls bowled	6,697
Wickets	79
Bowling average	45.25
5 wickets in innings	2
10 wickets in match	0
Best bowling	5/71
Catches/stumpings	115/0
- Source: Cricinfo, 21 May 2022

Desmond William Barrick (28 April 1926 – 25 December 2007) was an English cricketer who played in 301 first-class matches between 1949 and 1960.

== Career ==
Barrick was born in Fitzwilliam, Yorkshire. A right-handed batsman and an occasional leg-break and googly bowler, he made his first-class debut for Northamptonshire in 1949, aged 23. In his first match he scored 34 not out and 36 not out, in his second match a month later he made 147 not out against the New Zealanders, and he was not dismissed until his third match, by which time he had made 228 runs.

A short but fearless attacking middle-order batsman, Barrick hit his career best of 211 against Essex in 1952, adding 347 for the fifth wicket with Dennis Brookes. He was awarded his county cap during that season. He played a number of matches for Marylebone Cricket Club (MCC) between 1953 and 1957. He toured India with the Commonwealth XI in 1953–54, scoring 867 runs at an average of 41.28 in the first-class matches, including 102 not out in the second unofficial Test.

Barrick reached 1000 runs in a season seven times between 1952 and 1960, with a highest tally of 1570 runs in 1952. In 1953 he scored 1407 runs in the County Championship at an average of 61.17, and set a second-wicket partnership record for the county when he and Jock Livingston put on an unbroken 299 in 265 minutes against Sussex. In his final season, 1960, he captained Northamptonshire in most of their matches in the absence of Raman Subba Row owing to Test match duties and injuries.

After he retired from first-class cricket, Barrick played league cricket, including two seasons as professional for Todmorden in the Lancashire League in 1962 and 1963.

== Personal life ==
Barrick married Jean Reynolds and they had three children. He died in Kellington, North Yorkshire, on Christmas Day 2007, aged 81.
