= Jack Manning (cricketer) =

Australian cricketer

Personal information
- Full name: John Stephen Manning
- Born: 11 June 1923; Semaphore, South Australia, Australia
- Died: 5 May 1988 (aged 64); Adelaide, South Australia, Australia
- Batting: Left-handed
- Bowling: Left-arm orthodox spin
- Role: Bowler/all-rounder

Domestic team information
- Years: Team
- 1951/52–1953/54: South Australia
- 1954–1960: Northamptonshire
- First-class debut: 16 November 1951 South Australia v Victoria
- Last First-class: 6 September 1960 A Commonwealth XI v An England XI

Career statistics
| Competition | FC |
|---|---|
| Matches | 146 |
| Runs scored | 2766 |
| Batting average | 15.71 |
| 100s/50s | 1/8 |
| Top score | 132 |
| Balls bowled | 28327 |
| Wickets | 513 |
| Bowling average | 22.73 |
| 5 wickets in innings | 25 |
| 10 wickets in match | 4 |
| Best bowling | 8–43 |
| Catches/stumpings | 77/– |
- Source: CricketArchive, 2 June 2012

John Stephen Manning, usually known as Jack Manning, (11 June 1923 – 5 May 1988) was an Australian cricketer who played first-class cricket for South Australia and in England for Northamptonshire. He was born at Semaphore, South Australia and died at Adelaide, also in South Australia.

Manning was a left-handed lower order batsman and a left-arm orthodox spin bowler.

== Cricket in Australia ==
Manning was a late starter in first-class cricket and did not make his debut for South Australia until he was 28: thereafter, he was pretty much a regular in the team for two-and-a-half seasons. He took useful wickets and made occasional useful runs but did not, in 19 matches for the team, ever take five wickets in an innings. His best bowling for the South Australia team was four wickets for 39 in the game against Victoria in 1952–53, the season when South Australia won the Sheffield Shield. In most of his state games for South Australia Manning played alongside future Test bowler Jack Wilson, who was a left-arm spin bowler of similar type.

== Move to England ==
In 1954, Manning moved to England where he played in Lancashire League cricket for Colne for two seasons while waiting to qualify for County Championship cricket with Northamptonshire. He was an immediate success in the 1956 season, when he took 116 wickets: Wisden Cricketers' Almanack noted that "his immaculate length and sharp spin made an excellent foil to the subtle variations of [George] Tribe". Manning was awarded his County cap in his first season, which was also, with a fourth-place finish, Northamptonshire's best year in the County Championship since 1912. His best bowling of the season came in just the second match of the season, against the County Champions Surrey at The Oval, when his seven for 68 in the second innings against a full-strength Surrey team led to victory by seven wickets.

Northamptonshire did even better in 1957, finishing as runners-up to Surrey in the County Championship, one of only three instances in which the county team has come this close to winning the title. Manning's contribution was 109 wickets in all first-class games and Wisden noted that three left-arm spinners, Tribe, Manning and Michael Allen, took 305 Championship wickets between them. Manning's batting, often useful but rarely prolific, had its day of greatest triumph with an innings of 132, his only first-class century, in the game against Yorkshire at Harrogate, when he put on 191 for the seventh wicket with Keith Andrew, whose 76 was also his highest first-class score.

The pattern of Manning's first two years for Northamptonshire was repeated in the wet summer of 1958 and the hot summer of 1959: around 500 runs from the lower order with 86 wickets in 1958 and a better return of 114 in 1959. The 114 included his single best bowling performance: he took eight for 43 in the first innings and five for 44 in the second against Gloucestershire at Peterborough for his best innings and match figures.

Tribe retired at the end of the 1959 season and the balance of the Northamptonshire bowling attack shifted dramatically in 1960 as the team fell to the bottom of the table after more than a month without a single victory. Manning – "victim of some ruthless rebuilding", wrote Wisden in its obituary of him in 1989 – was dropped from the team at the end of May and did not play for the county's first eleven again, the attack being led by newcomers David Larter, a fast bowler from Scotland, and Brian Crump, a seam bowler from the Potteries. Manning played for the county's second eleven across 1960 and 1961, but his only other first-class match was an appearance for a Commonwealth XI in a festival match at the end of the 1960 season, when he signed off with second innings figures of six for 112, five of the six being stumped by his fellow Australian exile, Ben Barnett.

== Retirement ==
After his playing career ended, Manning returned to South Australia. He was for a time the publican of the hotel in the small town of Hallett. He was also involved in coaching on the Yorke Peninsula.
