= 1953 English cricket season =

1953 was the 54th season of County Championship cricket in England. There was a tight Test series between England and Australia that was settled, after four drawn matches, in the final Test at The Oval, where England won to reclaim The Ashes for the first time since the Bodyline series of 1932–33. The County Championship was won by Surrey for the second consecutive season.

== Honours ==
- County Championship – Surrey
- Minor Counties Championship – Berkshire
- Wisden (honour awarded in 1954 Wisden Cricketer's Almanack for deeds done in 1953 English season) – Neil Harvey, Tony Lock, Keith Miller, Johnny Wardle, Willie Watson

== Test series ==
Cumulative record - Test wins	1876–1953
England	57
Australia	68
Drawn	38

== Leading batsmen ==
1953 English cricket season – leading batsmen by average
Name	Innings	Runs	Highest	Average	100s
Neil Harvey	35	2040	202*	65.80	10
Len Hutton	44	2458	241	63.02	8
Jock Livingston	36	1710	140	57.00	7
Keith Miller	31	1433	262*	51.17	4
Peter May	59	2554	159	51.08	8
Raman Subba Row	46	1823	146*	50.63	4
Desmond Barrick	38	1530	166*	49.35	3

1953 English cricket season – leading batsmen by aggregate
Name	Innings	Runs	Highest	Average	100s
Bill Edrich	60	2557	211	47.35	5
Peter May	59	2554	159	51.08	8
Reg Simpson	60	2505	157	45.54	7
Len Hutton	44	2458	241	63.02	8
Don Kenyon	58	2439	238*	44.34	6

== Leading bowlers ==
1953 English cricket season – leading bowlers by average
Name	Balls	Maidens	Runs	Wickets	Average
Jack Bailey	760	35	326	25	13.04
Charles Knott	1325	65	521	38	13.71
Les Jackson	4450	230	1574	103	15.28
Tony Lock	4394	282	1590	100	15.90
Tom Graveney	567	19	324	20	16.20

1953 English cricket season – leading bowlers by aggregate
Name	Balls	Maidens	Runs	Wickets	Average
Bruce Dooland	7995	461	2852	172	16.58
Roy Tattersall	7086	348	2974	164	18.13
Alec Bedser	7518	340	2702	162	16.67
Derek Shackleton	7318	328	3070	150	20.46
Johnny Wardle	9633	601	3540	146	24.24

== Annual reviews ==
- Playfair Cricket Annual 1954
- Wisden Cricketers' Almanack 1954
