= International cricket in 1949–50 =

International cricket season

The 1949–50 international cricket season was from September 1949 to April 1950.

== Season overview ==
International tours
Start date	Home team	Away team	Results [Matches]			
Start date	Home team	Away team	Test	ODI	FC	LA
11 November 1949	India	Commonwealth	—	—	2–1 [5]	—
24 December 1949	South Africa	Australia	0–4 [5]	—	—	—
25 February 1950	Ceylon	Commonwealth	—	—	0–1 [1]	—
25 March 1950	Pakistan	Ceylon	—	—	2–0 [2]	—

== November ==
=== Commonwealth in India ===
Unofficial Test series
No.	Date	Home captain	Away captain	Venue	Result
Un Test 1	11–15 November	Vijay Merchant	Jock Livingston	Feroz Shah Kotla Ground, Delhi	Commonwealth XI by 9 wickets
Un Test 2	16–20 December	Vijay Merchant	Jock Livingston	Brabourne Stadium, Bombay	Match drawn
Un Test 3	30 Dec–3 January	Vijay Hazare	Jock Livingston	Eden Gardens, Calcutta	India by 7 wickets
Un Test 4	14–18 January	Vijay Hazare	Jock Livingston	Modi Stadium, Kanpur	Match drawn
Un Test 5	17–21 February	Vijay Hazare	Jock Livingston	MA Chidambaram Stadium, Madras	India by 3 wickets

== December ==
=== Australia in South Africa ===
Test series
No.	Date	Home captain	Away captain	Venue	Result
Test 318	24–28 December	Dudley Nourse	Lindsay Hassett	Ellis Park Stadium, Johannesburg	Australia by an innings and 85 runs
Test 319	31 Dec–4 January	Dudley Nourse	Lindsay Hassett	Newlands, Cape Town	Australia by 8 wickets
Test 320	20–24 January	Dudley Nourse	Lindsay Hassett	Kingsmead, Durban	Australia by 5 wickets
Test 321	10–14 February	Dudley Nourse	Lindsay Hassett	Ellis Park Stadium, Johannesburg	Match drawn
Test 322	3–6 March	Dudley Nourse	Lindsay Hassett	Crusaders Ground, Port Elizabeth	Australia by an innings and 259 runs

== February ==
=== Commonwealth in Ceylon ===
Three-day match series
No.	Date	Home captain	Away captain	Venue	Result
Match 1	25–27 February	Sathyendra Coomaraswamy	Jock Livingston	P Saravanamuttu Stadium, Colombo	Commonwealth XI by an innings and 51 runs
Match 2	4–6 March	SS Jayawickreme	Jock Livingston	P Saravanamuttu Stadium, Colombo	Match drawn

== March ==
=== Ceylon in Pakistan ===
Unofficial Test series
No.	Date	Home captain	Away captain	Venue	Result
Un Test 1	25–28 March	Mohammad Saeed	SS Jayawickreme	Bagh-e-Jinnah, Lahore	Pakistan by an innings and 45 runs
Un Test 2	13–15 April	Mohammad Saeed	SS Jayawickreme	Gymkhana Ground, Karachi	Pakistan by 10 wickets
