= Sydney Starkie =

English cricketer

Personal information
- Born: 4 April 1926; Burnley, Lancashire
- Died: 18 September 2017 (aged 91); Amersham, Buckinghamshire
- Batting: Right-handed
- Bowling: Right-arm off-break
- Role: Bowler

Domestic team information
- Years: Team
- 1951–1956: Northamptonshire

Career statistics
Competition	First-class
Matches	95
Runs scored	857
Batting average	10.71
100s/50s	0/1
Top score	60
Balls bowled	13,547
Wickets	166
Bowling average	34.24
5 wickets in innings	6
10 wickets in match	1
Best bowling	6/33
Catches/stumpings	64/–
- Source: Cricinfo, 24 April 2023

Sydney Starkie (4 April 1926 – 18 September 2017) was an English professional cricketer who spent a six-season career at Northamptonshire.

Starkie was born at Burnley, Lancashire and died at Amersham, Buckinghamshire.

Starkie was an off-break bowler, and he played in 95 first-class games from 1951 to 1956. He is also remembered for one batting feat: in 1955 Starkie and Raman Subba Row set a Northamptonshire club record of 156 for the highest ninth-wicket partnership. Starkie was awarded his county cap in 1954.

== Death ==
Starkie died on 18 September 2017 at the age of 91 at Amersham, Buckinghamshire.
