= David Larter =

Scottish cricketer (born 1940)

Personal information
- Full name: John David Frederick Larter
- Born: 24 April 1940 (age 86); Inverness, Inverness-shire, Scotland, United Kingdom
- Height: 6 ft 7 in (2.01 m)
- Batting: Right-handed
- Bowling: Right-arm fast

International information
- National side: England

Domestic team information
- Years: Team
- 1960 to 1969: Northamptonshire

Career statistics
Competition	Tests	First-class
Matches	10	182
Runs scored	16	639
Batting average	3.20	6.08
100s/50s	–/–	–/1
Top score	10	51*
Balls bowled	2,172	31,395
Wickets	37	666
Bowling average	25.43	19.53
5 wickets in innings	2	27
10 wickets in match	–	5
Best bowling	5/57	8/28
Catches/stumpings	5/–	56/–
- Source: Cricinfo, 22 May 2020

John David Frederick Larter (born 24 April 1940, Inverness, Scotland) is a former Scottish cricketer, who played in ten Tests for England from 1962 to 1965.

The cricket writer, Colin Bateman, noted, "David Larter was a complex character. There were days at Northampton when he just would not fancy bowling. But when the mood took him and his 6ft 7in physique was in perfect working order, he was a frighteningly good fast bowler, as a career record of 666 wickets at 19 apiece suggests".

== Life and career ==
A six-foot seven-inch right arm fast bowler with a long run-up, Larter played his earliest cricket in England with Suffolk in the Minor Counties Championship, having been educated in the county at Framlingham College. He then qualified for Northamptonshire. He made his debut for Northamptonshire in 1960, and made such a favourable impression that he was picked for the non-Test playing tour of New Zealand that winter and proved the "great success" of the tour with 36 wickets for under 15 runs apiece. With the retirement of Tyson, Tribe and Manning, he became the county's leading wicket-taker in 1961 with 70 for 19.87 apiece in a summer unfavourable to bowlers.

The following season saw Larter improve even more to take over 100 wickets, including nine on his Test debut against Pakistan at the Oval. Larter bagged sixteen wickets in his first two Tests, and a long Test career appeared to beckon, although he was overlooked by the selectors during his most successful year of 1963 despite being the second most successful fast bowler after Trueman with 121 wickets for 16.75 apiece. Larter had become a regular tourist for England with his selection for the 1962/63 Ashes tour, and for the 1963/64 tour of India, but his Test appearances were limited by a succession of niggling injuries. In all, he took just 37 wickets at 25.43. His career was badly affected by an ankle injury picked up in Sydney on the 1965/66 tour of Australia and he retired after playing a few games for Northamptonshire in 1966 and 1969.

He took 666 first class wickets at 19.53 apiece. His best figures, 8 for 28, came in the second innings against Somerset at Northampton in 1965 after he had taken 4 for 28 in the first innings. In the next match, against Yorkshire at Headingley, Leeds, he took 5 for 43 and 7 for 37, giving him 24 for 136 in one week. Although Larter's batting was notoriously poor, he hit an unlikely unbeaten half century against Nottinghamshire at Trent Bridge in 1962, coming in at his usual number 11 and putting on a valuable last-wicket stand of 85 in an hour with Keith Andrew.

After retiring from cricket at the age of 29, he ran the family transport business before moving into company training.

== See also ==
- List of Test cricketers born in non-Test playing nations
