= Town Ground, Peterborough =

Cricket ground in Peterborough, England

Coordinates: 52.5778°N 0.2377°W

The Town Ground in Peterborough, England, is a cricket ground which was used by Northamptonshire County Cricket Club in first-class matches for 60 years between 1906 and 1966. It is now used predominantly for Northamptonshire Premier League games, serving as the home ground of Peterborough Town CC.

== Records ==
- Lowest team total: 82 by Northamptonshire vs Gloucestershire, 1946
- Highest individual score: 232* by John Langridge for Sussex against Northamptonshire, 1934
- Highest partnership: 361 by V Broderick and N Oldfield for the first wicket in Northamptonshire's innings against Scotland, 1953

- Northamptonshire declared upon the dismissal of V Broderick.

- Best bowling in an innings: 8–26 by RW Clarke for Northamptonshire against Hampshire, 1951
- Best Bowling in a match: 14–211 by AF Wensley for Sussex against Northamptonshire, 1929
