= Terry Freeman =

English cricketer

Terence Freeman (born 21 October 1931) is a former English cricketer who played for Northamptonshire. He was born in Finedon, Northamptonshire.

Freeman was a right-arm fast-medium bowler. He made a single first-class appearance, in August 1954, against Hampshire, playing alongside his cousin Robert Clarke. He bowled 24 overs and took one wicket, that of Ray Pitman, for 90 runs. Freeman made one run in his only innings, dismissed by Pitman. The match was drawn, and Freeman never played for the county again.

With the death of Harry Kelleher on 4 June 2025, Freeman became the oldest living Northamptonshire player.
