= Reg Partridge =

English cricketer

Reginald Partridge
Personal information
- Full name: Reginald Joseph Partridge
- Born: 11 February 1912; Wollaston, Northamptonshire, England
- Died: 1 February 1997 (aged 84); Northampton, England
- Batting: Right-handed
- Bowling: Right-arm leg-breaks, off-breaks and medium pace
- Role: Bowler

Domestic team information
- Years: Team
- 1929–1948: Northamptonshire

Career statistics
Competition	First-class
Matches	280
Runs scored	3,922
Batting average	11.53
100s/50s	–/10
Top score	70
Balls bowled	43,315
Wickets	638
Bowling average	31.26
5 wickets in innings	22
10 wickets in match	2
Best bowling	9/66
Catches/stumpings	104/–
- Source: CricketArchive, 6 December 2024

Reginald Joseph Partridge (11 February 1912 – 1 February 1997) was an English cricketer active from 1929 to 1948 who played for Northamptonshire (Northants). He appeared in 280 first-class matches as a righthanded batsman who bowled right arm medium pace, off break and leg break. Partridge was born in Wollaston, Northamptonshire on 11 February 1912 and died in Northampton on 1 February 1997. He scored 3,922 runs with a highest score of 70 and took 638 wickets with a best performance of nine for 66.
