= Robin Boyd-Moss =

Sri Lankan-born English cricketer

Personal information
- Full name: Robin James Boyd-Moss
- Born: 16 December 1959 (age 66); Hatton, Ceylon
- Batting: Right-handed
- Bowling: Slow left-arm orthodox
- Role: Batsman

Domestic team information
- Years: Team
- 1977–1979: Bedfordshire
- 1980–1983: Cambridge University
- 1980–1987: Northamptonshire

Career statistics
| Competition | First-class | List A |
|---|---|---|
| Matches | 153 | 83 |
| Runs scored | 7,171 | 1,602 |
| Batting average | 30.25 | 22.88 |
| 100s/50s | 13/42 | 0/8 |
| Top score | 155 | 99 |
| Balls bowled | 3,911 | 174 |
| Wickets | 51 | 3 |
| Bowling average | 43.09 | 44.33 |
| 5 wickets in innings | 1 | 0 |
| 10 wickets in match | 0 | 0 |
| Best bowling | 5/27 | 3/47 |
| Catches/stumpings | 61/– | 20/– |
- Source: Cricinfo, 30 July 2009

Robin James Boyd-Moss (born 16 December 1959) is a former English professional cricketer who started his career with Bedfordshire in the Minor Counties Championship before playing first-class cricket for Cambridge University and Northamptonshire from 1980 to 1987.

== Career ==
Boyd-Moss's career was relatively short owing to a series of setbacks: in 1984 (his first full season at Northamptonshire) he broke a thumb while playing, and then contracted hepatitis; a year later, back problems kept him out of action until mid-June; centuries against Lancashire and Glamorgan set him up for a successful season in 1986, only for his form to drop in the closing weeks of the season. Fitness problems restricted him to only half a dozen matches in 1987.

Boyd-Moss's finest achievement is arguably his partnership with Geoff Cook in 1986, in which they scored 344 runs, breaking the Northamptonshire record for the highest second-wicket partnership. In 1982, Boyd-Moss and Kapil Dev hit 182 runs off of Derbyshire's front line bowlers in just 98 minutes, speeding up their declaration, leading ultimately to an emphatic victory; Boyd-Moss had hit 137 in the first innings, following up with an unbeaten 80 in the second, matching his more illustrious batting partner shot for shot. He ended that season with 1,602 first-class runs at an average of 44.50, earning the county some new video equipment as the Commercial Union Young Batsman of the Year. In 1984 he was awarded his county cap. But four years later he retired, and settled in Kenya, where he ran a garage and car hire business as well as a farm.

He coached the Kenyan cricket team for some years; his discoveries included Steve Tikolo.
