= Commonwealth XI cricket team in India, Pakistan and Ceylon in 1949–50 =

Commonwealth cricket team

A Commonwealth XI cricket team toured Ceylon, India and Pakistan from October 1949 to March 1950 and played 21 first-class matches, including five against an All-India XI.

Captained by Jock Livingston, who also kept wicket in some games, the team had several well-known players including Frank Worrell, George Tribe, Bill Alley, Cec Pepper, George Dawkes and George Pope. Most of the players were professionals in the Lancashire League or the Central Lancashire League. About half the team were Australians, two were West Indians, and the rest were English.

== Matches ==
The first-class matches are numbered.

No.	Date	Opponents	Venue	Result	Ref
1	9–11 October	Indian Universities	Brabourne Stadium, Bombay	Drawn	
2	15–16 October	Western India States	Commerce College Ground, Ahmedabad	Won by an innings and 122 runs	
3	21–23 October	Holkar	Yeshwant Club Ground, Indore	Won by one wicket	
4	29 October–1 November	North Zone	Baradari Ground, Patiala	Drawn	
5	5–7 November	Services	Irwin Stadium, Delhi	Won by ten wickets	
6	11–15 November	INDIA (1st "Test")	Feroz Shah Kotla, Delhi	Won by nine wickets	
	18–19 November	North West Frontier Province Governor’s XI	Peshawar Club Ground, Peshawar	Drawn	
	21–22 November	Commander-in-Chief’s XI	Pindi Club Ground, Rawalpindi	Drawn	
7	25–27 November	Pakistan	Bagh-e-Jinnah, Lahore	Won by an innings and 177 runs	
8	2–4 December	Karachi and Sind	Karachi Gymkhana Ground, Karachi	Won by six wickets	
	6–7 December	Pakistan Universities	Karachi	Drawn	
9	10–13 December	West Zone	Club of Maharashtra, Poona	Drawn	
10	16–20 December	INDIA (2nd "Test")	Brabourne Stadium, Bombay	Drawn	
11	24–27 December	Bengal Governor’s XI	Eden Gardens, Calcutta	Won by ten wickets	
12	30 December–3 January	INDIA (3rd "Test")	Eden Gardens, Calcutta	Lost by seven wickets	
13	7–9 January	East Zone	Keenan Stadium, Jamshedpur	Won by ten wickets	
14	14–18 January	INDIA (4th "Test")	Modi Stadium, Kanpur	Drawn	
15	21–23 January	Central Province Governor's XI	Central Provinces Gymkhana Ground, Nagpur	Drawn	
16	27–29 January	Cricket Club of India	Brabourne Stadium, Bombay	Drawn	
	1–2 February	India Schools	Brabourne Stadium, Bombay	Drawn	
17	4–6 February	Bombay	Brabourne Stadium, Bombay	Drawn	
18	10–13 February	South Zone	Gymkhana Ground, Secunderabad	Won by seven wickets	
19	17–21 February	INDIA (5th "Test")	Madras Cricket Club Ground, Madras	Lost by three wickets	
	23 February	Central Province	Kandy	Won by seven wickets	
20	25–27 February	Ceylon	Colombo Oval, Colombo	Won by an innings and 51 runs	
	1–2 March	Ceylon XI	Colombo	Drawn	
21	4–6 March	Ceylon, India and Pakistan Combined XI	Colombo Oval, Colombo	Drawn	
	10–12 March	Raja Maharaj Singh’s XII (Note: Played as twelve-a-side)	Brabourne Stadium, Bombay	Won by six wickets	
