= Albert Thomas (cricketer) =

Welsh cricketer

Personal information
- Full name: Albert Edward Thomas
- Born: 7 June 1893; Ruthin, Wales
- Died: 21 March 1965 (aged 71); Kidderminster, England
- Nickname: Taffy
- Batting: Right-handed
- Bowling: Right-arm
- Role: Bowler

Domestic team information
- Years: Team
- 1919–1933: Northamptonshire
- 1927: Wales

Career statistics
Competition	First-class
Matches	288
Runs scored	4,872
Batting average	13.49
100s/50s	0/11
Top score	84
Balls bowled	64,661
Wickets	832
Bowling average	25.52
5 wickets in innings	30
10 wickets in match	5
Best bowling	9/30
Catches/stumpings	121/–
- Source: Cricinfo, 5 July 2009

Albert Edward Thomas (7 June 1893 – 21 March 1965) was a Welsh cricketer who played for Northamptonshire from 1919 to 1933 and Wales in 1927. Thomas was a righthanded batsman and bowled right arm fast-medium pace. He took a career total of 817 wickets for Northants making him the club's fifth highest wicket taker. He died on 21 March 1965 in Kidderminster.

== Career ==
(Adapted from the book '100 greats of Northamptonshire County Cricket Club); Thomas bowled over 63,000 balls for Northamptonshire, and opposing batsmen scored off of the Welsh medium-pacer at an average of just under two runs an over. It was his control that was a significant feature of the clubs bowling attack following the First World War. Furthermore, his approach to life mirrored his approach to cricket; sound, level-headed and a calming influence on some of his more temperamental colleagues. Billeted in Northampton during the war years, Thomas had attracted the attention of groundsman Alf Stockwin when he came to bowl in the nets at Wantage Road. His debut, against the Australian Imperial Forces side in 1919, was not a great success, but Northampton Grammar School took him on as groundsman and coach, giving Northamptonshire the opportunity to keep tabs on him. They decided to take another look and he justified their interest with 9–30 against Yorkshire at Bradford in 1920 with the last seven wickets only costing him six runs, and one lifting ball hit wicketkeeper Walter Buswell in the eye and put him out of the match. Only 'Bumper' Wells' dismissal of Roy Kilner prevented the county's first 'all-ten'.

His place in the squad secure, Thomas proceeded to record some staggering analyses over the next decade. In 1926, against Leicestershire at Aylestone Road, he took 2-42 from 45 overs; and that was a costly effort compared to his 3-17 from 34 overs, including 23 maidens, on the same ground in 1930. That same season saw him earn a £2 bonus from the Mayor of Northampton after he and Vallance Jupp skittled Bill Woodfull's Australians, including Donald Bradman, for 93 and made them follow on. Another touring side to fall foul of him were the 1924 South Africans, against whom he claimed 8-96, and Thomas represented the Players against the Gentlemen at Lords in 1928.

An elbow injury, which necessitated surgery, ended his county career in 1933, he was granted a testimonial which didn't amount to much, and turned to the Birmingham League where he sent down many more maidens for Kidderminster, Aston Unity and Old Hill before putting away his boots in 1948.
