= Peter Arnold (cricketer) =

New Zealand cricketer (1926–2021)

Personal information
- Full name: Arnold Peter Arnold
- Born: 16 October 1926; Wellington, New Zealand
- Died: 6 September 2021 (aged 94); Northampton, England
- Batting: Right-handed
- Bowling: Right-arm medium

Domestic team information
- Years: Team
- 1951–1960: Northamptonshire
- 1953–54: Canterbury

Career statistics
Competition	First-class
Matches	174
Runs scored	8013
Batting average	27.53
100s/50s	7/45
Top score	122
Balls bowled	226
Wickets	3
Bowling average	28.33
5 wickets in innings	0
10 wickets in match	0
Best bowling	1/5
Catches/stumpings	79
- Source: CricketArchive, 8 June 2016

Arnold Peter Arnold (16 October 1926 – 6 September 2021) was a cricketer who played first-class cricket from 1951 to 1960. He was a right-handed batsman.

== Career ==
Peter Arnold learned to play cricket at St Bede's College, Christchurch, New Zealand. He went to England in 1950 seeking a career as a professional cricketer. He played for Northamptonshire from 1951 to 1960, and for Canterbury in New Zealand for one season in 1953–54. In all he played in 174 first-class games, scoring 8,013 runs at an average of 27.53 with seven centuries and a highest score of 122. He also took 79 catches.

In the 1980s and 1990s he was on the registration and discipline committee of the ECB and chair of the Northamptonshire cricket committee. He was President of the Northamptonshire club from 1996 to 2000.

After moving to England, Arnold spent the rest of his life in Northampton. He built several successful businesses there, including Arnold Engineering Plastics Ltd. Married to Rosemary, he had two sons and two daughters.

Upon the death of Iain Gallaway on 18 April 2021, Arnold became the oldest living New Zealand first-class cricketer. With Arnold's death aged 94 on 6 September 2021, that honour passed to Bill Crump.
