= Town Ground, Kettering =

Cricket ground in Kettering, England

Coordinates: 52°23′33″N 0°44′02″W

The Town Ground in Kettering, England was used by Northamptonshire for 65 first-class cricket matches between 1923 and 1971. It also staged four List A games in the early 1970s, and has occasionally been used by Northamptonshire's Second XI.

== Records ==
=== First-class ===
- Highest team total: 571/9 declared by Sussex v Northamptonshire, 1928
- Lowest team total: 27 by Northamptonshire v Yorkshire, 1933

- George Macaulay took 7-9 for Yorkshire in this innings.

- Highest individual innings: 232 by George Cox junior for Sussex v Northamptonshire, 1939
- Best bowling in an innings: 9-66 by Reginald Partridge for Northamptonshire v Warwickshire, 1934
- Best bowling in a match: 16-35 by Bill Bowes for Yorkshire v Northamptonshire, 1935

=== List A ===
- Highest team total: 157/6 (40 overs) by Sussex v Northamptonshire, 1970
- Lowest team total: 80 (30.4 overs) by Nottinghamshire v Northamptonshire, 1972
- Highest individual innings: 67 by Peter Willey for Northamptonshire v Sussex, 1970
- Best bowling in an innings: 4-17 by Sarfraz Nawaz for Northamptonshire v Leicestershire, 1971; and by Bob Cottam for Northamptonshire v Nottinghamshire, 1972
