= Iain Gallaway =

New Zealand cricketer and broadcaster (1922–2021)

Iain Gallaway QSO MBE

Personal information
- Full name: Iain Watson Gallaway
- Born: 26 December 1922; Dunedin, New Zealand
- Died: 18 April 2021 (aged 98); Dunedin, New Zealand
- Batting: Right-handed
- Role: Wicket-keeper

Domestic team information
- Years: Team
- 1946/47–1947/48: Otago

Career statistics
Competition	First-class
Matches	3
Runs scored	26
Batting average	8.66
100s/50s	0/0
Top score	22
Catches/stumpings	7/1
- Source: CricketArchive, 31 January 2011

Iain Watson Gallaway QSO MBE (26 December 1922 – 18 April 2021) was a New Zealand broadcaster, lawyer and cricketer. He was a commentator on the radio station Radio Sport, and a first-class cricketer. Between January 2021 and his death, Gallaway was New Zealand's oldest living first-class cricketer.

== Early life ==
Gallaway was born in Dunedin, Otago, on 26 December 1922. He attended Christ's College, Christchurch, and the University of Otago. His first job was as a cadet reporter for the Otago Daily Times.

Gallaway served in the Royal New Zealand Navy during World War II, patrolling the Atlantic and the North Sea on a D-class cruiser. After his stint in the navy, he studied law at the University of New Zealand in Dunedin and worked as a lawyer in the Dunedin firm that is now Gallaway Cook Allan. He went on to become an officer of the Otago Law Society and the New Zealand Law Society.

== Career ==
Gallaway played three first-class cricket matches for Otago between 1946 and 1948 as a right-handed lower-order batsman and wicketkeeper. In his first match against Wellington he took six catches. He also acted as an international rugby referee, officiating a Southland match against Australia in 1949, and West Coast against the British Lions the following year.

In a radio commentary career that extended from 1953 to 1992, Gallaway broadcast about 500 rugby matches and numerous cricket matches, mostly from the Carisbrook ground in Dunedin. He also accompanied the New Zealand Test cricket team to Pakistan and India in 1955–56 – the first time a broadcaster had toured with a New Zealand Test team – as well as serving as the sole New Zealand Press Association correspondent on the tour.

Gallaway retired from broadcasting after the 1992 Cricket World Cup, concerned that his declining eyesight would cause him to make incorrect calls. The final match he broadcast was New Zealand's victory over India in the round-robin stage. Gallaway's book Not a Cloud in the Sky: The Autobiography of Iain Gallaway was published five years later in 1997. He was the official patron of the Otago Cricket Association until his death.

== Honours and recognition ==
Gallaway was appointed a Member of the Order of the British Empire in the 1978 Queen's Birthday Honours, for services to rugby and cricket. In the 1986 Queen's Birthday Honours, he was made a Companion of the Queen's Service Order for community service, specifically for his work as chancellor of the Anglican Diocese of Dunedin over a quarter of a century. He received a Halberg Award for services to sport in 1999. Gallaway was awarded life membership of New Zealand Cricket in 2010.

Upon the death of Alan Burgess on 6 January 2021, Gallaway became the oldest living New Zealand first-class cricketer. When Gallaway died, that honour passed to Peter Arnold.

== Personal life ==
Gallaway was married to his wife, Virginia, until her death. Together, they had four children, Sarah, Annie, Garth, and Alice. Garth has worked as a cricket commentator on Radio Sport and as a lawyer in Christchurch, and is Chair of the Arts Foundation of New Zealand.

Gallaway died on 18 April 2021, at the age of 98.
