= Vince Broderick =

English cricketer

Personal information
- Full name: Vincent Broderick
- Born: 17 August 1920; Bacup, Lancashire, England
- Died: 14 November 2010 (aged 90); Winchester, Hampshire, England
- Nickname: Brod, Vince
- Batting: Left-handed
- Bowling: Slow Left-arm orthodox
- Role: All-rounder

Domestic team information
- Years: Team
- 1939–1957: Northamptonshire
- 1949: Marylebone Cricket Club (MCC)

Career statistics
Competition	FC
Matches	253
Runs scored	7530
Batting average	22.14
100s/50s	6/32
Top score	190
Balls bowled	38765
Wickets	548
Bowling average	27.38
5 wickets in innings	23
10 wickets in match	4
Best bowling	9/35
Catches/stumpings	65/–
- Source: CricketArchive, 27 November 2010

Vincent Broderick (17 August 1920 – 14 November 2010), known as Vince Broderick, was an English cricketer who played for Northamptonshire and briefly for the MCC. Considered an All-rounder, Broderick is notable for having the third best bowling figures in a single innings in Northamptonshire history. This career best of 9-35 came in 1948 against Sussex at Horsham. He was born at Bacup, Lancashire.

== Career ==
Broderick was taken on by Northamptonshire's groundstaff in 1939, earning £3 a week. He made his first-class debut – a draw in which he recorded bowling figures of 1-46 and was bowled for a duck – against Glamorgan at Cardiff. This match happened just a few days before the German invasion of Poland. Resuming his career after the war, Broderick became a regular in the team throughout the 1947 season, claiming 75 wickets including 8–16 against Derbyshire at the Town Ground in Rushden. 1948 not only brought Broderick his career best bowling figures on a drying pitch, he also registered his first two centuries against Warwickshire and Essex. After this Broderick began to become more successful as a batsman as his bowling became less prolific. In 1953 he recorded his career best batting score of 190 in a first wicket Partnership of 361 with Buddy Oldfield at Peterborough, this partnership remained a county record until 1996. In 1957 Broderick retired from first-class cricket, taking charge of Northamptonshire's Second XI before coaching at Winchester College until 1987.

Remaining in Winchester and in his later years living at Colden Common just outside the city, Broderick was a regular at the Wykeham Arms in the city for more than 50 years. He died on 14 November 2010.
