= David Ripley =

English cricketer and coach

Personal information
- Full name: David Ripley
- Born: 13 September 1966 (age 60); Leeds, Yorkshire, England
- Batting: Right-handed
- Role: Wicket-keeper

Domestic team information
- Years: Team
- 1984–2001: Northamptonshire
- FC debut: 26 May 1984 Northants v Leicestershire
- Last FC: 12 September 2001 Northants v Somerset
- LA debut: 27 May 1984 Northants v Middlesex
- Last LA: 2 September 2001 Northants v Nottinghamshire

Career statistics
Competition	FC	LA
Matches	307	281
Runs scored	8,693	1,885
Batting average	28.40	18.48
100s/50s	9/34	0/1
Top score	209	52*
Balls bowled	60	–
Wickets	2	–
Bowling average	51.50	–
5 wickets in innings	0	–
10 wickets in match	0	n/a
Best bowling	2/89	–
Catches/stumpings	678/85	227/36
- Source: CricketArchive, 23 September 2021

David Ripley (born 13 September 1966, Leeds, Yorkshire) is an England cricket coach and former cricketer who played for Northamptonshire in county cricket from 1984-2001.

He took 678 catches and 85 stumpings. In his 307 first-class games he scored 8693 runs at 28.40 with nine centuries.

He attended Royds comprehensive school where he also excelled in football. He played youth cricket for Carlton Cricket Club, and for Leeds Loe Lumb and Yorkshire Colts at representative level, winning his Yorkshire cap at age 14.

Ripley was appointed vice-captain of Northamptonshire in 1999 and became captain in his final season, replacing Matthew Hayden. In 1998 he put on 401 for the fifth wicket with Mal Loye against Glamorgan. To date they are the only Northamptonshire pair to ever put on 400 runs.

His most prolific year with the gloves came in 1988 with 81 dismissals. In the same year he took six dismissals in an innings against Sussex.

Ripley served as the first team coach at Northamptonshire between 2012 and 2021 (replacing the late David Capel).

In 2013, Ripley led Northants to promotion from County Championship Division 2 and the Friends Life T20. In 2016, Ripley led the County to a second NatWest T20 Blast success.

He stood down in September 2021 and has been replaced by his former assistant John Sadler.

In December 2021, Ripley was appointed interim coach of Cricket Ireland on a 3 month contract
