= Geoff Cook =

English cricketer

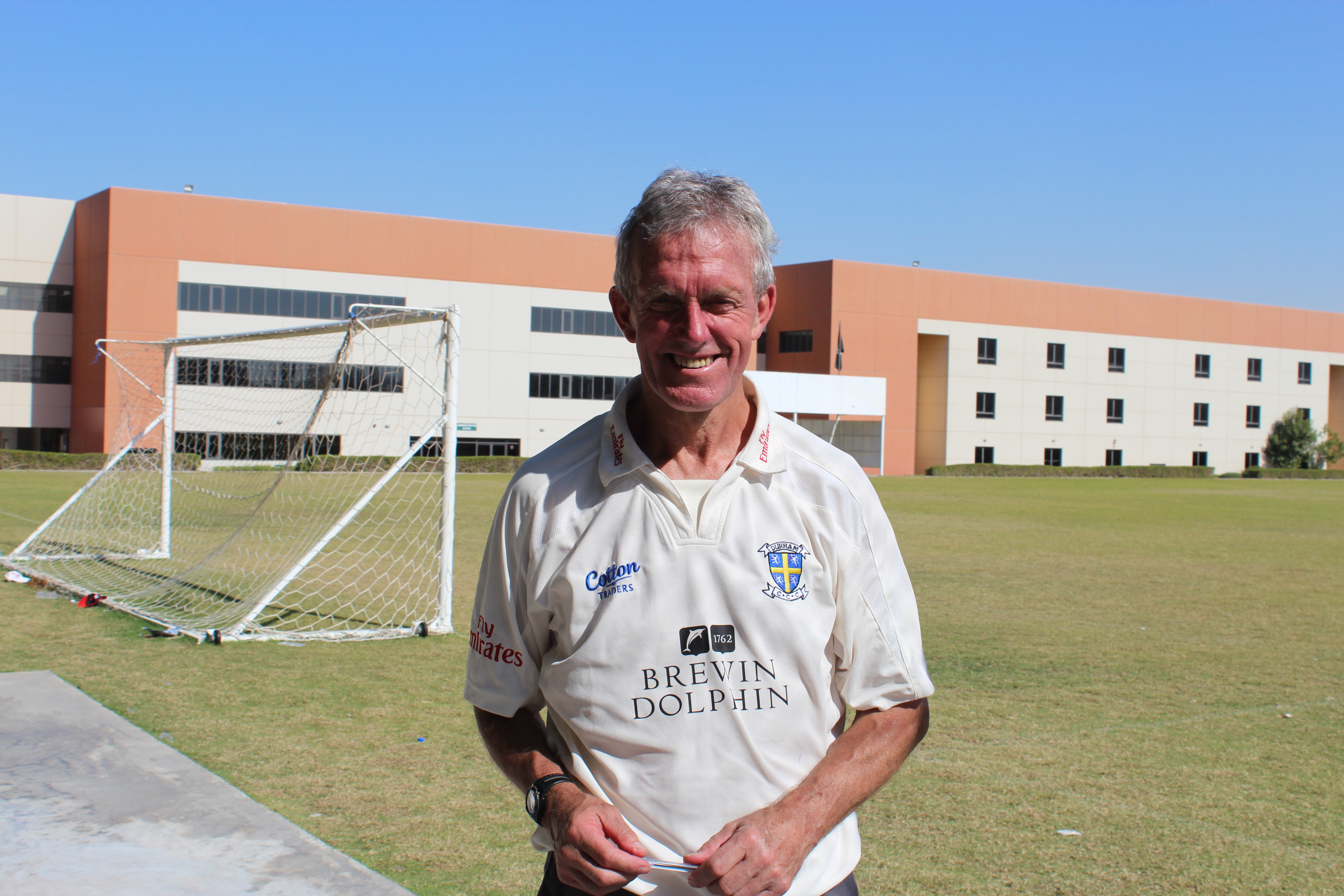
- Geoff Cook at Delhi Private School, Dubai in 2011

Personal information
- Full name: Geoffrey Cook
- Born: 9 October 1951 (age 75); Middlesbrough, Yorkshire, England
- Height: 6 ft 0 in (1.83 m)
- Batting: Right-handed
- Bowling: Slow left-arm orthodox
- Role: Batsman

Domestic team information
- Years: Team
- 1971–1990: Northamptonshire
- 1978/79–1980/81: Eastern Province
- 1991–1995: Durham

Career statistics
Competition	Test	ODI	FC	LA
Matches	7	6	460	377
Runs scored	203	106	23,277	8,705
Batting average	15.61	17.66	31.97	26.78
100s/50s	0/2	0/0	37/112	4/53
Top score	66	32	203	130
Balls bowled	42	–	1,238	12
Wickets	–	–	15	0
Bowling average	–	–	31.97	–
5 wickets in innings	–	–	0	–
10 wickets in match	–	–	0	–
Best bowling	–	–	3/47	–
Catches/stumpings	9/–	2/–	419/3	157/–
- Source: Cricinfo, 11 July 2009

Geoffrey Cook (born 9 October 1951) is a former English cricketer, who played in seven Test matches and six One Day Internationals from 1981 to 1983. Cricket writer, Colin Bateman, stated "A player held in great respect by his fellow professionals, Cook got his big chance when the first rebel tour went to South Africa in 1982, but he was unable to convert his consistent county form into Test success".

== Career ==
In county cricket he played for Northamptonshire where, along with Robin Boyd-Moss, he achieved a second wicket partnership of 344, which remains a Northamptonshire record. Cook made a century as captain and was man of the match in the final of the NatWest Bank Trophy in 1981 at Lord's against Derbyshire, although he finished on the losing team. (The previous year he had had a happier experience at Lord's, helping Northamptonshire to win the Benson and Hedges Cup.) His 1981 Lord's hundred helped win Cook selection on England's tours that to winter to India and Sri Lanka. It was observed that he mounted a "staunch battle for Test recognition" towards the end of these tours, with scores of 104 in successive first-class innings against the Central Zone, and the Sri Lanka Board President's XI. He duly made his Test debut in Sri Lanka's inaugural test in 1982. Cook made his highest Test score of 66 against India the following summer, playing seven Tests in total, but struggled in Australia in the following winter. He later moved to Durham, when they gained first-class status, becoming their first county captain. After running the county's youth Academy, he was appointed first team coach in March 2007, following Martyn Moxon's resignation. Under Cook's guidance, Durham won their first major title in the club's history at Lord's in 2007, and went on to win the County Championship for the first time in 2008, and again in 2009. In June 2013 Cook suffered a heart attack. He completed the season and won the County Championship for a third time with Durham in 2013. Cook was subsequently replaced full-time as first team coach by Jon Lewis, moving into a youth development role.

He has been both chairman and secretary of the Professional Cricketers' Association.
