= Gordon Garlick =

English cricketer

Personal information
- Full name: Richard Gordon Garlick
- Born: 11 April 1917; Kirkby Lonsdale, Westmorland, England
- Died: 16 May 1988 (aged 71); Blackpool, Lancashire, England
- Batting: Right-handed
- Bowling: Right-arm off-break, also medium pace
- Role: Bowler

Domestic team information
- Years: Team
- 1938–1947: Lancashire
- 1948–1950: Northamptonshire

Career statistics
Competition	First-class
Matches	121
Runs scored	1,663
Batting average	13.85
100s/50s	–/4
Top score	62*
Balls bowled	22,345
Wickets	332
Bowling average	26.11
5 wickets in innings	10
10 wickets in match	1
Best bowling	6/27
Catches/stumpings	38/–
- Source: CricketArchive, 21 December 2024

Richard Gordon Garlick (11 April 1917 – 16 May 1988) was an English cricketer who played for Lancashire and Northamptonshire. He appeared in 121 first-class matches as a right-arm bowler, deploying both off spin and medium pace seam. He was a righthanded batter. Garlick was born in Kirkby Lonsdale, Westmorland, 11 April 1917 and died in Blackpool on 16 May 1988. He was awarded two county caps, Lancashire in 1947 and Northamptonshire in 1949; he left Lancashire after the 1947 season and joined Northants for the 1948 season.

== Sources ==
- Gordon Garlick at Cricinfo
- Playfair Cricket Annual – 1948 edition
