= Paul Taylor (cricketer, born 1964) =

English cricketer (born 1964)

Personal information
- Full name: Jonathan Paul Taylor
- Born: 8 August 1964 (age 62); Ashby-de-la-Zouch, Leicestershire, England
- Batting: Left-handed
- Bowling: Left-arm fast-medium

Career statistics
Competition	Test	ODI
Matches	2	1
Runs scored	34	1
Batting average	17.00	1.00
100s/50s	0/0	0/0
Top score	17	1
Balls bowled	288	18
Wickets	3	0
Bowling average	52.00	–
5 wickets in innings	0	–
10 wickets in match	0	–
Best bowling	1/18	–
Catches/stumpings	0/–	0/–
- Source: CricInfo, 1 January 2006

Jonathan Paul Taylor (born 8 August 1964) is an English former cricketer, who played in two Test matches and one One Day International for England in 1993 and 1994.

== Life and career ==
He began his career at Derbyshire but, unable to cement a regular place in the side, was released in 1987. He went on to play Minor County cricket for Staffordshire and so impressed Northants during a NatWest Trophy tie in 1990, despite conceding 92 runs in his stint, that he was engaged for the 1991 season. His rebirth in county cricket proved so productive that he was picked to tour India, although he suffered with the rest of England's bowling attack in the defeat in Calcutta. He played one more Test, against New Zealand in 1994 but, despite bowling tidily and blocking out the last half-hour to save the game in partnership with Steve Rhodes, was not picked for England again.

He remained a consistent wicket-taker through the 1990s, renowned for his fitness and the accuracy of his left arm seamers. In eleven seasons he took over 500 first-class wickets for Northamptonshire, until his release in 2001.

Taylor also made sporadic appearances in Sunday morning football, for Coleorton Hall in the Charnwood Sunday League.
