= Brian Crump =

English cricketer

Personal information
- Full name: Brian Stanley Crump
- Born: 25 April 1938 (age 88); Chell, England
- Nickname: The Atomic Pill
- Batting: Right-handed
- Bowling: Right-arm off break; Right-arm medium
- Role: All-rounder

Domestic team information
- Years: Team
- 1955–1958: Staffordshire
- 1960–1972: Northamptonshire

Career statistics
Competition	First-class	List A
Matches	321	72
Runs scored	8,789	691
Batting average	23.88	14.70
100s/50s	5/40	0/2
Top score	133*	74
Balls bowled	54,533	3,130
Wickets	814	87
Bowling average	24.77	20.00
5 wickets in innings	30	1
10 wickets in match	5	0
Best bowling	7/29	5/16
Catches/stumpings	144/–	11/–
- Source: Cricinfo, 5 July 2009

Brian Stanley Crump (born 25 April 1938) is a former cricketer who played for Northamptonshire.

== Family ==
Crump's father was Staffordshire Minor Counties cricketer Stanley Crump, while his cousins were David Steele (of Northamptonshire and England) and John Steele (of Leicestershire and Glamorgan).

== Career ==
Brian Crump was a pillar of the Northamptonshire side in the 1960s. Perhaps his finest cricketing moment came at Cardiff in August 1965. Northamptonshire and Glamorgan were both in strong contention for County Championship honours, and Keith Andrew's men secured a tense 18-run victory which, at the time, looked to have given them a decisive advantage in the title race. Crump took 8-142 from 76.3 overs in the game, conceding less than two runs an over, and was carried into the pavilion when the final Glamorgan wicket went down, having bowled unchanged in the second innings.

As a batsman, he managed five centuries—with a ten-year gap between the second and third—and made his best score of 133 not out against Warwickshire at Edgbaston in 1971.

He was released at the end of his benefit year, 1972, but was still trundling away in club and over-50's cricket the best part of three decades later. His influence has been continued to be felt through his encouragement of Northamptonshire's former off-spinner and fellow Staffordshire boy Jason Brown.

Crump's family cricketing links include his father Stanley Crump who represented Staffordshire between 1930 and 1960, son Neil Crump who represented Staffordshire at all junior levels, daughter Julie Crump who played for England Women in 1989 and grandson Austen Crump who is representing Staffordshire at junior level.
