= Mal Loye =

English cricketer

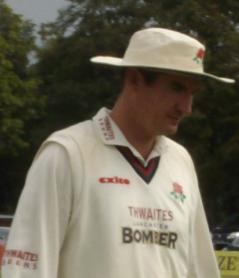

Personal information
- Full name: Malachy Bernard Loye
- Born: 27 September 1972 (age 54); Northampton, England
- Nickname: Chairman, Jacko
- Height: 6 ft 3 in (1.91 m)
- Batting: Right-handed
- Bowling: Right-arm off spin
- Role: Batsman

International information
- National side: England
- ODI debut (cap 201): 19 January 2007 v Australia
- Last ODI: 11 February 2007 v Australia
- ODI shirt no.: 48

Domestic team information
- Years: Team
- 1991–2002: Northamptonshire
- 2003–2009: Lancashire (squad no. 1)
- 2006/07: Auckland
- 2010–2011: Northamptonshire (squad no. 2)
- 2012: Buckinghamshire

Career statistics
Competition	ODI	FC	LA	T20
Matches	7	264	304	42
Runs scored	142	15,329	8,973	1,246
Batting average	20.29	39.91	33.86	33.67
100s/50s	0/0	42/65	10/59	1/8
Top score	45	322*	127	100
Balls bowled	–	55	–	–
Wickets	–	1	–	–
Bowling average	–	61.00	–	–
5 wickets in innings	–	0	–	–
10 wickets in match	–	0	–	–
Best bowling	–	1/8	–	–
Catches/stumpings	0/–	119/–	67/–	15/–
- Source: Cricinfo, 25 October 2012

Malachy Bernard Loye (born 27 September 1972), is an English former cricketer who played first-class cricket for Northamptonshire, Lancashire, and England A. Loye is a right-handed batsman, particularly well known for his slog sweep shot against fast bowlers. Deep into a long career, he also finally made his One Day International debut against Australia on 19 January 2007 aged 34 years 113 days.

== Early life ==
Loye was educated at Moulton Comprehensive School and Durham University, where he played for the university side. He was part of the Durham University team that won the 1993 Universities Athletic Union final against Manchester University.

== Career ==
=== Northamptonshire ===
After making his debut in 1991, Loye received the Northamptonshire cap in 1994, and passed 1,000 runs in a season for the first time in 1996. In 1998 he made almost 1,200 first-class runs including the county's individual scoring record of 322 not out against Glamorgan. In the same game he shared a stand of 401 with David Ripley which beat the record of the highest fifth-wicket stand in England, a record which in turn lasted until a stand by Colin Ackermann and Wiaan Mulder in July 2022. Loye ended up with four hundreds in 1998, a new season best, and was named PCA Player of the Year to follow on from his 1993 award of PCA Young Player of the Year. After a couple of lean years where he made less than 600 runs, Loye has averaged above 48 in every season save 2002, and scored more than 900 runs a season. Now he has over 10,000 first-class runs to his name and has represented both England U19 and England 'A', first touring South Africa with England 'A' in 1993–4, and returning in 1998–9.

=== Lancashire ===
Loye transferred to Lancashire in 2003. He was an ever-present during Lancashire's march to the County Championship Division Two title in 2005 and was the county's leading run-scorer with 1,198, including a knock of 200 against Durham. He almost became the first Lancashire batsman ever to score consecutive double centuries but was dismissed for 194 in the next match against Essex. Loye also made a century in the Twenty20 Cup for the first time when he hammered exactly 100 against Durham, including five sixes and 10 fours. Loye became a mainstay in the Lancashire top-order from there on and his good form provided him with a call-up to England's One Day International 30-man preliminary squad for the ICC Champions Trophy in India. He was awarded with a benefit season for 2008.

=== Return to Northamptonshire ===
After 7 years away from Northamptonshire, Loye returned to Wantage Road, signing a 2-year contract on 29 September 2009. He was released by the county following the 2011 season. Following his release he joined Buckinghamshire for the 2012 season, making his debut for the county in the MCCA Knockout Trophy against Dorset.

== International career ==
On 4 October 2006 he was called up to the England squad for the Hong Kong Sixes event in November. Loye acted as a wicket keeper for the England team led by Dominic Cork during the tournament.

In January 2007 Loye was playing for Auckland, when he was called up to the England squad as cover for the injured Michael Vaughan, and made his One Day International debut on 19 January 2007 when he was England's top scorer with 36 runs off 36 balls. Cricket commentator Simon Mann remarked after the game that "Loye's front foot sweep for six off Brett Lee was the stroke of the series so far".

Loye was left out of England's squad for the 2007 Cricket World Cup in favour of Ravi Bopara. Chairman of selectors David Graveney said that Loye could be considered unlucky and had not done anything wrong, but that his inclusion would have made the squad "top-heavy". He was also left out of England's Twenty20 squad for a tournament in South Africa, despite having had healthy stats and success in the domestic form of the game over the previous few seasons and having averaged 57 in the 2007 tournament.

== Post-retirement ==
After retiring from professional cricket, Loye continued to work within the sport. He coached cricket at a number of private schools in England, and also coached at Derbyshire County Cricket Club. Loye also coached cricket in Natal, South Africa, and worked as an ODI coach for the Bangladesh cricket team between 2015 and 2016, quitting due to terrorism fears.
