= Haydn Sully =

English cricketer

Personal information
- Full name: Haydn Sully
- Born: 1 November 1939; Sampford Brett, Williton, Somerset, England
- Died: 14 December 2006 (aged 67); Exeter, Devon, England
- Batting: Left-handed
- Bowling: Right-arm off-break

Domestic team information
- Years: Team
- 1959–1963: Somerset
- 1964–1969: Northamptonshire

Career statistics
Competition	FC	LA
Matches	122	1
Runs scored	722	–
Batting average	8.59	–
100s/50s	0/0	–/–
Top score	48	–
Balls bowled	19161	72
Wickets	314	2
Bowling average	27.66	19.50
5 wickets in innings	16	0
10 wickets in match	2	n/a
Best bowling	7/29	2/39
Catches/stumpings	63/–	0/–
- Source: CricketArchive, 22 December 2015

Haydn Sully (1 November 1939 – 14 December 2006) was a first-class cricketer who played for Somerset and Northamptonshire from 1959 to 1969.

A left-handed tail-end batsman and a right-arm off-break bowler, Sully played for Somerset occasionally from 1959 to 1963, but was unable to win a regular place with the presence of Brian Langford, also an off-spinner, in the team. He joined Northamptonshire in 1964, and the following season, coming into the side regularly from mid-July, took 42 wickets at an average of 18 each, including 27 in just three matches. Northamptonshire finished second in the County Championship, four points behind the eventual winners, Worcestershire, the closest the team has ever come to winning the title.

In 1966, Sully played the full season and took 101 wickets at 21 runs each, the only time he took 100 wickets in a season. He was awarded his county cap as the side's leading wicket-taker. He played regularly for Northamptonshire in both the 1967 and 1968 seasons, but though he took 80 wickets in 1967, the average had risen to more than 30, and his 51 wickets in 1968 cost more than 34 runs each. He played only a few matches in 1969 and left first-class cricket at the end of the season.

Settling in Devon where he worked for Whiteways Cyder, Sully played a few times for Devon in the Minor Counties in 1970 and 1971, and captained the Sidmouth cricket club for several years.
