= John Timms =

English cricketer

Cricket information
- Batting: Right-handed
- Bowling: Right-arm medium

Career statistics
Competition	First-class
Matches	472
Runs scored	20,509
Batting average	25.07
100s/50s	31/103
Top score	213
Balls bowled	12,597
Wickets	149
Bowling average	44.46
5 wickets in innings	2
10 wickets in match	0
Best bowling	6/18
Catches/stumpings	153/–
- Source: CricketArchive, 12 April 2023

John Edward Timms (3 November 1906 – 18 March 1980) was an English first-class cricketer who played for Northamptonshire. He was a right-handed middle order batsman and a part time right arm medium pace bowler.

Timms made his first-class debut in 1925, aged 18 and scored his maiden century the following season. He passed 1,000 runs in a season on 11 occasions during his career with a best of 1629 runs in 1934 which he made at an average of 34.65. That year he also made his highest score for Northamptonshire, 213 against Worcestershire at Stourbridge.
