= Albert Lightfoot =

English cricketer (1936–2023)

Personal information
- Born: 8 January 1936; Woore, Shropshire, England
- Died: 30 April 2023 (aged 87); England
- Batting: Left-handed
- Bowling: Right-arm medium
- Role: All-rounder

Domestic team information
- Years: Team
- 1953–1970: Northamptonshire
- 1955: Combined Services

Career statistics
Competition	FC	List A
Matches	294	31
Runs scored	12000	474
Batting average	27.64	18.96
100s/50s	12/61	0/2
Top score	174*	84*
Balls bowled	14983	87
Wickets	172	1
Bowling average	36.00	72.00
5 wickets in innings	4	0
10 wickets in match	0	0
Best bowling	7/25	1/18
Catches/stumpings	161/–	9/–
- Source: Cricinfo, 28 July 2009

Albert Lightfoot (8 January 1936 – 30 April 2023) was an English cricketer who played first-class cricket for Northamptonshire from 1953 to 1970.

== County career ==
Lightfoot joined Northamptonshire in 1953, and was awarded his county cap in 1961. He also made First-Class appearances for the Combined Services (in 1955), TN Pearce's XI (1962), a Players team (1962 also), and AER Gilligan's XI (1963). He played 294 first-class matches, and also 31 one-day matches from 1963 up until his retirement, a format he never quite adapted to with bat or ball. Lightfoot bowled for the last time in 1968, before retiring altogether in 1970.

Lightfoot was signed principally as a medium-fast bowler, but he soon emerged as a talented left-handed batsman, with his breakthrough being a maiden century against Surrey at The Oval in 1958, when he helped Raman Subba Row add a record-breaking 376 for the sixth wicket.

However, many Northamptonshire fans who witnessed his career will be quicker to mention the one run that he didn't make rather than the 12,000 that he did. Against Richie Benaud's 1961 Australians, Northamptonshire mounted a spirited challenge after being left to score 198 for victory in two and a half hours, and Lightfoot's gallant half-century helped reduce the target to four runs off the final over. With one ball to go, the scores were level. Alan Davidson bowled to Malcolm Scott who missed, but set off for a bye to acting wicketkeeper Bobby Simpson; Lightfoot, inexplicably, stayed put at the non-striker's end, Scott was run out, and Australia escaped with a draw.

It is possible that Lightfoot stayed in the team at times when his batting average drooped due to his ability to 'bowl a bit'. Despite such droops, particularly in the mid-1960s, he managed some very productive batting seasons, especially 1962 when he scored 1,795 runs for Northamptonshire including five hundreds. He also managed two career-reviving seasons in 1968 and 1969, reaching 1,000 runs in each. In the years in between colleagues felt that it was a lack of 'drive' which held him back. He took a benefit in 1970, having already told the club that he would not be staying in the game for the following season. (This passage was adapted from the book 100 Greats: Northamptonshire County Cricket Club.)

Lightfoot was the head groundsman at the County Ground between 1973 and 1978, and spent his later years in the north-west of England.

== Death ==
Lightfoot died on 30 April 2023, at the age of 87.
