= Vallance Jupp =

English cricketer (1891–1960)

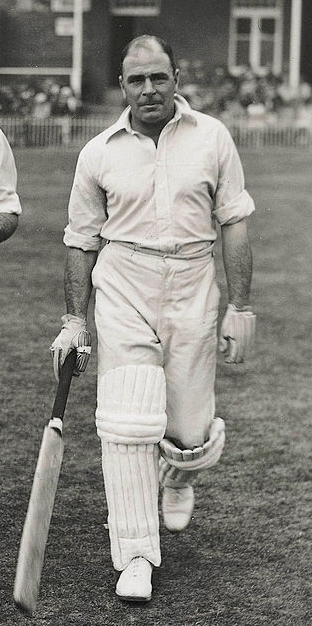
- Jupp in 1927

Personal information
- Full name: Vallance William Crisp Jupp
- Born: 27 March 1891; Burgess Hill, Sussex, England
- Died: 9 July 1960 (aged 69); Spratton, Northamptonshire, England
- Batting: Right-handed
- Bowling: Right arm off break Right arm medium-fast

International information
- National side: England
- Test debut (cap 191): 28 May 1921 v Australia
- Last Test: 24 July 1928 v West Indies

Domestic team information
- Years: Team
- 1909–1922: Sussex
- 1923–1938: Northamptonshire

Career statistics
Competition	Test	First-class
Matches	8	529
Runs scored	208	23,296
Batting average	17.33	29.41
100s/50s	0/0	30/120
Top score	38	217 not out
Balls bowled	1,301	72,574
Wickets	28	1,658
Bowling average	22.00	23.01
5 wickets in innings	0	111
10 wickets in match	0	18
Best bowling	4/37	10/127
Catches/stumpings	5/–	222/–
- Source: CricketArchive, 8 November 2009

Vallance William Crisp Jupp (27 March 1891 – 9 July 1960) was an amateur cricketer who played for Sussex and Northamptonshire. Jupp also played eight Test matches for England, and was named as one of the five Wisden Cricketers of the Year in 1928.

== Biography ==
Born 27 March 1891 in Burgess Hill, Sussex, England, Jupp started his career in 1909 with Sussex, before moving to Northamptonshire in 1921 to take up the secretaryship of the club. This provided Jupp with an income and allowed him to retain his status as an "amateur" cricket player (he was paid to be club secretary, not to play cricket). After he qualified to play for Northamptonshire by residence, he assisted that county, and by 1927 was, in Wisden's opinion, the best all-round amateur in first-class cricket at the time.

Jupp played regularly for Sussex after his first year with them, making such steady improvement that in 1914, with a highest innings of 217 not out, against Worcestershire at Worcester, he finished third in the batting figures, and had an average of over 36. In that season he scored over 1,500 runs and, with fifty-one wickets, headed the bowling. By this time it was obvious Sussex had discovered one of the most promising all-round players in the country. On the outbreak of the First World War he joined the Royal Engineers in December 1914, and served in France, Salonika and Palestine where he transferred as a cadet to the Royal Air Force (despite this absence, Jupp features helping out at a fête in Sussex in 1915 in William Boyd's novel Waiting for Sunrise). Demobilised in July 1919, he played for Sussex as an amateur in the remaining matches of that season, and very quickly showed that over four years absence from cricket had not impaired his powers.

In 1921 he scored nearly 2,000 runs, heading the county batting with an average of over 47, and took 93 wickets for rather less than 23 runs apiece, At the end of the summer of 1920 he received an invitation to be a member of the Marylebone Cricket Club (MCC) team in Australia, but was unable to accept. Two years afterwards, however, he went to South Africa under the captaincy of Frank Mann, but did not reproduce his English form. In 1921 he played for England against Australia at Trent Bridge and Headingley. He went on to play four Tests against South Africa in 1922/3 and two Tests against the West Indies in 1928.

As a batsman Jupp was versatile.He possessed a wide variety of strokes, and could drive or cut with equal power and facility. Before the First World War, and for a time afterwards he bowled medium pace rather on the quick side, but later took a shorter run, and became a slow to slow-medium bowler. Few bowlers of the 1920s spun the ball as much as he did and, with a wicket to help him, he could make it turn to a pronounced degree. He was also rated as a brilliant fieldsman at cover point.

In 1927 Jupp became captain of Northamptonshire, a post he held until 1931. He continued as a player for the county until 1939. Jupp achieved the double of 1,000 runs and 100 wickets in a season ten times, and along with Freddie Brown is one of the only two cricketers to have achieved that feat for two different teams. Ironically, his best season as a bowler was the one after the one for which he was named Wisden Cricketer of the Year – in 1928 he took 166 wickets at 20.15.

He continued playing first-class cricket for Northamptonshire until 1938, but did not play at all in 1934 or 1935. This is because of the fact – unmentioned by Wisden at the time – that he had been convicted of manslaughter after his car had been in collision with a motorcycle, killing the latter's pillion passenger. Jupp was sentenced to nine months in prison, and was released in June 1935 after serving half his sentence, but did not play cricket again until the following year.

Jupp collapsed and died in the garden at his home in Spratton on 9 July 1960. He was 69.
