= Robert Clarke (cricketer) =

English cricketer

Personal information
- Full name: Robert Wakefield Clarke
- Born: 22 April 1924; Finedon, Northamptonshire, England
- Died: 3 August 1981 (aged 57); Sherborne, Dorset, England
- Batting: Left-handed
- Bowling: Left-arm fast
- Relatives: Terry Freeman (cousin)

Domestic team information
- Years: Team
- 1947–1957: Northamptonshire

Career statistics
Competition	FC
Matches	212
Runs scored	2,745
Batting average	15.33
100s/50s	0/6
Top score	56
Balls bowled	35,403
Wickets	484
Bowling average	34.60
5 wickets in innings	16
10 wickets in match	1
Best bowling	8/26
Catches/stumpings	150/–
- Source: Cricinfo, 6 June 2025

Robert Wakefield Clarke (22 April 1924 – 3 August 1981) was an English cricketer who played first-class cricket for Northamptonshire from 1947 to 1957.

Born in Finedon, Northamptonshire, Clarke appeared in 212 first-class matches as a left-arm fast bowler and left-handed lower-order batsman. He took 484 first-class wickets with a best performance of eight for 26, and scored 2,745 runs with a highest score of 56, one of six half-centuries.

After his playing career he became a coach, coaching successively at the Royal Naval College, Dartmouth, Christ's Hospital and Sherborne School.
