= Northamptonshire County Cricket Club =

English cricket club

- One Day name: Northants Steelbacks
- Twenty20 name: Northants Steelbacks
- League: County Championship; One-Day Cup; T20 Blast

Personnel
- Captain: Luke Procter (FC); Nathan McSweeney (LA); David Willey (T20)
- Coach: Darren Lehmann
- Overseas player(s): Matthew Breetzke; Harry Conway; Nathan McSweeney

Team information
- Founded: 1878; 148 years ago
- Home ground: cinch County Ground, Northampton
- Capacity: 6,500

History
- First-class debut: Hampshire in 1905 at Southampton
- Twenty20 Cup wins: 3
- FP Trophy/NatWest Trophy wins: 2
- B&H Cup wins: 1
First-class
One-day
T20

Northamptonshire County Cricket Club is one of eighteen first-class county clubs within the domestic cricket structure of England and Wales. It represents the historic county of Northamptonshire and fields both men's and women's teams. The men's limited-overs team is known as the Northants Steelbacks, while the women's side competes as Northamptonshire Steelbacks Women. The Steelbacks name is a reference to the Northamptonshire Regiment, which was formed in 1881. The name was supposedly a tribute to the soldiers' apparent indifference to the harsh discipline imposed by their officers. The club's modern Steelbacks branding is used across its white-ball, women's, pathway and disability teams.

Founded in 1878, Northamptonshire (Northants) held minor status at first but was a prominent member of the early Minor Counties Championship during the 1890s. In 1905, the club joined the County Championship and was elevated to first-class status, since when the men's team has played in every top-level domestic cricket competition in England.

The Northamptonshire women's team first entered the national women's county structure in 2001. Following the restructuring of women's domestic cricket, the side became part of the new ECB county structure as Northamptonshire Steelbacks Women for the 2025 season, competing in League 2 of the Women's T20 Blast and Women's One-Day Cup, as well as the knockout Women's T20 County Cup. The women's side is coached by former Northamptonshire men's head coach David Ripley, with Gemma Marriott captaining the Twenty20 team and Anisha Patel the 50-over side.

The club plays the majority of its matches at the cinch County Ground, Northampton. The men's side has also used outgrounds at Kettering, Wellingborough, Rushden and Peterborough (historically part of Northamptonshire, but currently governed with Cambridgeshire), as well as grounds outside the county for one-day matches, including Luton, Tring and Milton Keynes. The women's team also plays home fixtures at the cinch County Ground and at outgrounds around Northamptonshire.

== History ==
=== Earliest cricket ===
Cricket had probably reached Northamptonshire by the end of the 17th century and the first two references to cricket in the county are within a few days of each other in 1741. On Monday 10 August, there was a match at Woburn Park between a Bedfordshire XI and a combined Northants and Huntingdonshire XI. Woburn Cricket Club under the leadership of the Duke of Bedford was on the point of becoming a well known club. On Tuesday 18 August, a match played on the Cow Meadow near Northampton between two teams of amateurs from Northamptonshire and Buckinghamshire is the earliest known instance of cricket being played in Northamptonshire county.

=== Origin of club ===
On 31 July 1878, the official formation of Northants CCC took place at a meeting in the George Hotel, Kettering based on an existing organisation that dated back to 1820. The 1820 date, if it could be verified, would make Northants the oldest club in the present-day County Championship. The club came to prominence in the Minor Counties Championship during the 1890s as, between 1900 and 1904, the bowling of George Thompson and William East was much too good for almost all batsmen at that level. The county applied for first-class status in 1904 and was promoted the following year when it joined the County Championship. They played its inaugural first-class match versus Hampshire CCC at Southampton on 18, 19 & 20 May 1905 when making its County Championship debut.

=== Stepping up to first-class ===
Although Thompson and East proved themselves to be bowlers of high class, a weak batting line-up meant that the team remained close to the bottom of the championship table until Sydney Smith arrived in 1909. After three years in the middle of the table, Northants surprisingly improved to finish second in 1912 and fourth in 1913. Thompson, Smith and William "Bumper" Wells formed one of the strongest attacks in county cricket at the time, whilst Smith and Haywood were the county's best batsmen.

Thompson and Smith finished playing after World War I and, during the inter-war period, Northamptonshire were regularly one of the weaker championship sides. This was exacerbated when Vallance Jupp declined due to age and, despite the arrival of Nobby Clark, a young left arm fast bowler from Huntingdonshire who burst onto the scene at the age of 20 in 1922 with 20 wickets at an average of 17.10 and Fred Bakewell, an exciting batsman who regularly exceeded 1000 runs a season, Northamptonshire could only finish above second from last four times between 1923 and 1948, finishing last every year from 1934 to 1938 and enduring a run of 99 matches from 14 May 1935 to 29 May 1939 without a single championship victory, a record that has never been beaten. Things got worse for Northamptonshire during this time when Bakewell's career ended due to a broken arm in a car crash that also resulted in the fatality of teammate, Reginald Northway.

=== The post-war recovery ===
After the Second World War, things could only get better for Northamptonshire and they started by recruiting widely from other counties and countries, bringing in Freddie Brown from Surrey; the Australians Jock Livingston, George Tribe, and Jack Manning; the New Zealander Peter Arnold; and the Cambridge University opening bat and leg-spinner Raman Subba Row. Brown joined as captain in 1949, and led the team to sixth place in his first season after previous years of disappointment. Under the new leadership of Dennis Brookes (a stalwart batsman for over 20 years), finished second in 1957, their best finish for 45 years. The club's outstanding players at that time were wicket-keeper Keith Andrew and fast bowler Frank Tyson.

Subsequently, the club has seen mixed fortunes. The club has had intermittent success in one-day competitions, but it has still not won the County Championship, although second place was achieved in each of 1957, 1965 and 1976. Nonetheless, it has included several famous players qualified for England, including the South African-born batsman Allan Lamb; fast bowler David Larter; the hard hitting opener Colin Milburn, whose career was cut tragically short by an eye injury sustained in a car crash; the reliable batsmen David Steele and Rob Bailey; opening batsman Wayne Larkins; and all-rounders Peter Willey and David Capel.

Several notable overseas players such as Matthew Hayden, Curtly Ambrose, André Nel, Kapil Dev, Mike Hussey, Sarfraz Nawaz, Mushtaq Mohammad, Anil Kumble, Dennis Lillee and Bishen Bedi have starred for the club, which was particularly formidable as a one-day batting outfit in the late 1970s and early 1980s. More recently, Lance Klusener and Monty Panesar have been notable players.

Northants have recently been criticised for the number of Kolpak players in the team, but for the 2009 season there were only three in Andrew Hall, Johan van der Wath and Nicky Boje, and only one in 2013 in Hall.

=== White ball success ===
Northamptonshire have played in the domestic T20 Blast competition since its inaugural season in 2003. They play as the Northants Steeelbacks, taking their nickname from the Northamptonshire Regiment.

Under the captaincy of Alex Wakely they first won the competition in 2013, defeating Surrey by 102 runs (D/L). This was the first white ball trophy won by the county since 1992. After finishing runners up to Lancashire in the 2015 edition, the Steelbacks once again won the competition in 2016, defeating Durham by 4 wickets. Following a semi-final defeat in 2025, Northamptonshire won their third Blast title in 2026, defeating Hampshire by 14 runs in the final.

== Honours and achievements ==
=== First XI: Honours/Achievements ===
- County Championship (1905–1999)

Runners-up (4): 1912, 1957, 1965, 1976

CC Division One (From 2000)
Best placing - 6th: 2022

CC Division Two (From 2000)
Winners (1) - 2000
Runners-up (3): 2003, 2013, 2019

- T20 Blast

Winners (3) – 2013, 2016, 2026
Runners-up (1): 2015

- National League/Pro40

Division One
Runners-up (1): 2006
Division Two
Runners-up (1): 1999
3rd place/promoted (1): 2003

- Midlands Counties Knockout Cup

Winners (1): 1962

- NatWest Trophy (Note: Previously known as the Gillette Cup between 1963 and 1980, the NatWest Trophy between 1981 and 2000 and the Cheltenham & Gloucester Trophy between 2001 and 2006.)

Winners (2) – 1976, 1992
Runners-up (5): 1979, 1981, 1987, 1990, 1995

- Benson and Hedges Cup

Winners (1) – 1980
Runners-up (2): 1987, 1996

- Minor Counties Championship

Winners (2) – 1903, 1904
Shared (2): 1899, 1900

=== Second XI: Honours ===
- Second XI Championship

Winners (2) – 1960, 1998

- Second XI Trophy

Winners (2) – 1986, 1998

== Records ==
Most first-class runs for Northamptonshire
Qualification – 20,000 runs

Player	Runs
Dennis Brookes	28,980
Geoff Cook	20,976
John Timms	20,433
Wayne Larkins	20,317
Rob Bailey	20,181
Allan Lamb	20,128

Most first-class wickets for Northamptonshire
Qualification – 800 wickets

Player	Wickets
Nobby Clark	1,102
Vallance Jupp	1,078
George Thompson	1,078
George Tribe	1,021
Albert Thomas	817
Brian Crump	807

Team totals

Record	Score	Opposition	Venue	Year	Link
Highest total for	781–7 declared	Nottinghamshire	Northampton	1995	
Highest total against	673–8 declared	Yorkshire	Headingley	2003	
Lowest total for	12	Gloucestershire	Bristol	1907	
Lowest total against	33	Lancashire	Northampton	1977	

Batting

	Player	Information
Highest scores	1. Mike Hussey; 2. Mike Hussey; 3. Mal Loye	331* v .Somerset, County Ground, Taunton, 2003; 329* v. Essex, County Ground, Northampton, 2001; 322* v. Glamorgan, County Ground, Northampton, 1998
Most runs in season	1. Dennis Brookes; 2. Norman Oldfield; 3. Mike Hussey	2,198, 1952; 2,192, 1949; 2,055, 2001

Record partnership for each wicket

Wicket	Score	Batting partners	Opposition	Venue	Year	Link
1st	375	R A White & M J Powell	Gloucestershire	Northampton	2002	
2nd	344	G Cook & R J Boyd-Moss	Lancashire	Northampton	1986	
3rd	393	A Fordham & A J Lamb	Yorkshire	Leeds	1990	
4th	370	R T Virgin & P Willey	Somerset	Northampton	1976	
5th	401	M B Loye & D Ripley	Glamorgan	Northampton	1998	
6th	376	R Subba Row & A Lightfoot	Surrey	The Oval	1958	
7th	298*	S A Zaib & J Broad	Kent	Canterbury	2025	
8th	179	A J Hall & J D Middlebrook	Surrey	The Oval	2011	
9th	156	R Subba Row & S Starkie	Lancashire	Northampton	1955	
10th	148	B W Bellamy & J V Murdin	Glamorgan	Northampton	1925	

Bowling

	Player	Information
Best bowling (innings)	1. Vallance Jupp; 2. Albert Thomas; 3. Vincent Broderick	10–127 v. Kent, Nevill Ground, Tunbridge Wells, 1932; 9–30 v. Yorkshire, Park Avenue, Bradford, 1920; 9–35 v. Sussex, Cricketfield Road, Horsham, 1948
Best bowling (match)	1. George Tribe; 2. Vallance Jupp; 3. George Tribe	15–31 v. Yorkshire, County Ground, Northampton, 1958; 15–52 v. Glamorgan, St Helen's, Swansea, 1925; 15–75 v. Yorkshire, Park Avenue, Bradford, 1955
Most wickets in season	1. George Tribe; 2. George Thompson; 3. Nobby Clark	175, 1955; 148, 1913; 141, 1929

Wicket-keeping

	Player	Information
Most victims in innings	1. Keith Andrew; 2. David Ripley	7 v. Lancashire, Old Trafford, Manchester, 1962; 6 v. Sussex, County Ground, Northampton, 1988
Most victims in season	1. Keith Andrew; 2. David Ripley	90, 1962; 81, 1988

== Ground history ==
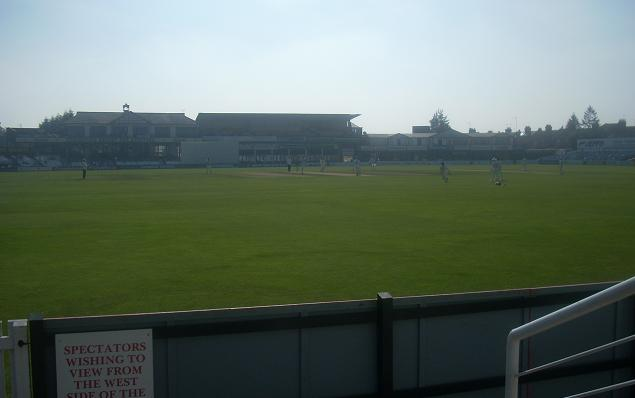
County Ground.

As with all county cricket clubs, Northamptonshire CCC represents the historic county and not any modern or current administrative unit. In Northamptonshire's case, this means the county of Northamptonshire and the Town of Northampton, although the club have in the past played some home matches outside the historic borders such as in Luton and Milton Keynes.

Northamptonshire first played at the county ground in Northampton in 1905, and continue to do so till this day even though Northampton Town F.C. shared the ground up until 1994 when the Cobblers moved to Sixfields Stadium. After the football club moved, the ground at the Abington Avenue was demolished and replaced by a new indoor school which includes seating looking on to the ground. In 2009, Northants cricket announced plans to improve the ground by building two new stands on the scoreboard side of the ground, there will also be a permanent commentary box with a view to have a 'mini Lord's' style media centre.

This following table gives details of every venue at which Northamptonshire have hosted a first-class, List A or Twenty20 cricket match:

Name of ground	Location	Year	FC matches	LA matches	T20 matches	Total
County Ground	Northampton	1905–present	969	341	17	1327
Town Ground	Kettering	1923–1973	65	4	–	69
School Ground	Wellingborough	1946–1991	43	17	–	60
Town Ground	Peterborough	1906–1966	46	–	–	46
Wardown Park	Luton	1973–2004	11	24	1	36
Town Ground	Rushden	1924–1963	22	–	–	22
Tring Park	Tring	1974–1991	–	16	–	16
Manor Fields	Bletchley	1976–1987	3	7	–	10
Baker Perkins	Peterborough	1967–1974	3	5	–	8
Campbell Park	Milton Keynes	1997–present	–	2	3	5
Buckingham Road	Brackley	1971–1975	–	4	–	4
Dolben Ground	Finedon	1986–1989	–	3	–	3
Bedford School	Bedford	1971–1982	–	2	–	2
Horton House	Horton	1976–1977	–	2	–	2
Ideal Clothiers Ground	Wellingborough	1929	1	–	–	1
Stowe School	Stowe	2005	–	1	–	1
Source: CricketArchive; Updated: 6 November 2009

== Current officials ==
- President: Gavin Warren
- Chair: Gary Hoffman
- Chief Executive: Ray Payne
- Scorer: Terry Owen
- Head Groundsman: Craig Harvey

=== Coaching staff ===
- Head coach: Darren Lehmann
- Assistant coach: Vacant
- Academy director: Kevin Innes
- Batting Coach: Greg Smith
- Bowling Coach: Vacant
- Pathway Performance coach: Adil Arif
- 2nd XI & Fielding Coach: Graeme White
- Performance Cricket Coach: James Maby
- Head physiotherapist/Science
  & Medicine Lead Coach: Nick Allen
- Head Strength
  & Conditioning Coach: Chris Lorkin

== Players ==
=== Women's cricket ===
From 2025, Northamptonshire Steelbacks Women entered League 2 of the Women's One-Day Cup and Women's T20 Blast as part of the restructured domestic women's game. Former Northamptonshire player and men's head coach David Ripley was appointed head coach of the women's side. Anisha Patel was appointed captain of the 50-over side, with Gemma Marriott captaining the team in Twenty20 cricket.

In their first season under the new structure, the Steelbacks reached the semi-finals of the Women's One-Day Cup League 2, but did not qualify for the T20 League 2 Finals Day. Patel and Marriott retained their respective captaincy roles for 2026. Northamptonshire again competed in League 2 of both competitions in 2026.

=== Current squad ===
The Northamptonshire squad for the 2027 season consists of (this section could change as players are released or signed):

- No. denotes the player's squad number, as worn on the back of their shirt.
- ‡ denotes players with international caps.
- * denotes a player who has been awarded a county cap.

No.	Name	Nationality	Birth date	Batting style	Bowling style	Notes
Batters
3	Matthew Breetzke ‡	South Africa	3 November 1998 (age 28)	Right-handed	—	Overseas player
14	George Bartlett	England	14 March 1998 (age 28)	Right-handed	Right-arm off break	
17	Louis Kimber	England	24 February 1997 (age 29)	Right-handed	Right-arm off break	
19	Stuart van der Merwe	England	24 February 2005 (age 21)	Right-handed	Right-arm medium	
27	Ricardo Vasconcelos*	South Africa	27 October 1997 (age 29)	Left-handed	—	Portuguese passport
38	Nathan McSweeney* ‡	Australia	8 March 1999 (age 27)	Right-handed	Right-arm off break	LA Captain; Overseas player
—	Finlay Bean	England	16 April 2002 (age 24)	Left-handed	—	
All-rounders
2	Luke Procter*	England	24 June 1988 (age 38)	Left-handed	Right-arm medium	Club captain
5	James Sales	England	11 February 2003 (age 23)	Right-handed	Right-arm medium	
23	David Willey* ‡	England	28 February 1990 (age 36)	Left-handed	Left-arm fast-medium	Captain (T20); White ball contract
24	Gus Miller	England	8 January 2002 (age 24)	Right-handed	Right-arm medium	
30	Calvin Harrison	England	29 April 1998 (age 28)	Right-handed	Right-arm leg break	
75	Justin Broad ‡	Germany	30 June 2000 (age 26)	Right-handed	Right-arm medium	
Wicket-keepers
15	Lewis McManus*	England	9 October 1994 (age 32)	Right-handed	—	Vice-captain (First-class)
Bowlers
13	Harry Conway	Australia	17 September 1992 (age 34)	Right-handed	Right-arm fast-medium	Overseas player
26	Ben Sanderson*	England	3 January 1989 (age 37)	Right-handed	Right-arm fast-medium	
33	Dom Leech	England	10 January 2001 (age 25)	Right-handed	Right-arm fast-medium	
36	Liam Guthrie	Australia	9 April 1997 (age 29)	Left-handed	Left-arm fast-medium	UK passport
46	Tiaan Louw	England	16 April 2006 (age 20)	Left-handed	Left-arm fast-medium	
62	Nirvan Ramesh	England	26 March 2008 (age 18)	Right-handed	Right-arm off break	
84	Raphy Weatherall	England	24 October 2004 (age 22)	Right-handed	Right-arm fast-medium	
98	George Scrimshaw ‡	England	10 February 1998 (age 28)	Right-handed	Right-arm fast	
Source: Updated: 9 April 2026

=== Notable players ===
This list is compiled of international cricketers who have played Test and/or ODI cricket. It also includes players who have been mentioned in the '100 Greats: Northamptonshire County Cricket Club' book. Therefore, making them notable to the county and international cricket scene.

England

- (England) Usman Afzaal
- (England) Michael Allen
- (England) Keith Andrew
- (England) Rob Bailey
- (England) Fred Bakewell
- (England) Desmond Barrick
- (England) Bill Barron
- (England) Benjamin Bellamy
- (England) Ravi Bopara
- (England) Robin Boyd-Moss
- (England) Vincent Broderick
- (England) Dennis Brookes
- (England) Freddie Brown
- (England) David Capel
- (England) Bob Carter
- (England) Nobby Clark
- (England) Geoff Cook
- (England) Nick Cook
- (England) Bob Cottam
- (England) Brian Crump
- (England) Ben Duckett
- (England) John Dye
- (England) John Emburey
- (England) Alan Fordham
- (England) Frederick Jakeman
- (England) Vallance Jupp
- (England) Allan Lamb
- (England) Wayne Larkins
- (England) David Larter
- (England) Albert Lightfoot
- (England) Mal Loye
- (England) Devon Malcolm
- (England) Neil Mallender
- (England) Austin Matthews
- (England) Colin Milburn
- (England) John Murdin
- (England) Buddy Oldfield
- (England) Monty Panesar
- (England) Tony Penberthy
- (England) Roger Prideaux
- (England) David Ripley
- (England) David Sales
- (England) George Sharp
- (England) Sydney Smith
- (England) David Steele
- (England) Raman Subba Row
- (England) Haydn Sully
- (England) Graeme Swann
- (England) Paul Taylor
- (England) Albert Thomas
- (England) George Thompson
- (England) John Timms
- (England) Frank Tyson
- (England) Roy Virgin
- (England) Fanny Walden
- (England) David Willey
- (England) Peter Willey
- (England) Claud Woolley

Australia

- (Australia) Trent Copeland
- (Australia) Ian Harvey
- (Australia) Matthew Hayden
- (Australia) Mike Hussey
- (Australia) Phil Jaques
- (Australia) Dennis Lillee
- (Australia) Jock Livingston
- (Australia) Martin Love
- (Australia) Chris Lynn
- (Australia) Matthew Nicholson
- (Australia) Chris Rogers
- (Australia) George Tribe
- (Australia) Cameron White

South Africa

- (South Africa) Hylton Ackerman
- (South Africa) Temba Bavuma
- (South Africa) Nicky Boje
- (South Africa) Johan Botha
- (South Africa) Matthew Breetzke
- (South Africa) Andrew Hall
- (South Africa) Richard Levi
- (South Africa) Johann Louw
- (South Africa) Rory Kleinveldt
- (South Africa) Lance Klusener
- (South Africa) André Nel
- (South Africa) Ryan Rickelton
- (South Africa) Johan van der Wath
- (South Africa) Martin van Jaarsveld

India

- (India) Bishan Bedi
- (India) Kapil Dev
- (India) Sourav Ganguly
- (India) Prithvi Shaw
- (India) Anil Kumble

Pakistan

- (Pakistan) Shahid Afridi
- (Pakistan) Mohammad Akram
- (Pakistan) Mushtaq Mohammad
- (Pakistan) Sarfraz Nawaz

West Indies

- (Cricket West Indies) Curtly Ambrose
- (Cricket West Indies) Winston Davis
- (Cricket West Indies) Roger Harper

New Zealand

- (New Zealand) Peter Arnold
- (New Zealand) Ken James
- (New Zealand) James Neesham
- (New Zealand) Lou Vincent
- (New Zealand) Will Young

Zimbabwe

- (Zimbabwe) Elton Chigumbura
- (Zimbabwe) Ben Curran
- (Zimbabwe) Kevin Curran
- (Zimbabwe) Blessing Muzarabani
- (Zimbabwe) Sikandar Raza

Ireland

- (Republic of Ireland) Niall O'Brien

Sri Lanka

- (Sri Lanka) Seekkuge Prasanna
- (Sri Lanka) Chaminda Vaas

Scotland

- (Scotland) David Murphy
- (Scotland) Tom Sole

== County captains ==
A complete list of officially appointed Northamptonshire captains can be found here: List of Northamptonshire cricket captains.

Notable captains:

- Freddie Brown (1949–1953)
- Dennis Brookes (1954–1957)
- Raman Subba Row (1958–1961)
- Keith Andrew (1962–1966)
- Mushtaq Mohammad (1976–1977)
- Allan Lamb (1989–1995)
- Matthew Hayden (1999–2000)
- Mike Hussey (2002–2003)
- Will Young (2022)

=== County caps ===
Northamptonshire do not automatically award caps to players on their first appearance; instead, they have to be 'earned' through good performances. In recent times, cricketers who are awarded a county cap are given a new cap with yellow stripes on the maroon instead of a plain maroon cap. The following players have received caps:

- 1946: W Barron, P E Murray-Willis
- 1947: V Broderick, A W Childs-Clarke, C B Clarke, K Fiddling, J Webster
- 1948: A E Nutter, N Oldfield
- 1949: F R Brown, R W Clarke, R G Garlick
- 1950: L Livingston
- 1951: F Jakeman
- 1952: D W Barrick, G E Tribe
- 1953: E Davis
- 1954: K V Andrew, S Starkie, F H Tyson
- 1955: A P Arnold, R Subba Row
- 1956: J S Manning, B L Reynolds
- 1957: M H J Allen
- 1960: L A Johnson, M E J C Norman
- 1961: J D F Larter, A Lightfoot
- 1962: B S Crump, R M Prideaux, P D Watts, P J Watts
- 1963: C Milburn
- 1964: M E Scott
- 1965: D S Steele
- 1966: H Sully
- 1967: M Mohammad
- 1969: H M Ackerman
- 1971: P Willey
- 1972: B S Bedi, R M H Cottam, J C J Dye
- 1973: G Sharp
- 1974: R T Virgin
- 1975: G Cook, S Nawaz
- 1976: A Hodgson, W Larkins
- 1978: B J Griffiths, A J Lamb, T M Lamb, T J Yardley
- 1979: R G Williams
- 1984: R J Boyd-Moss, N A Mallender
- 1985: R J Bailey
- 1986: D J Capel, R A Harper, D J Wild
- 1987: N G B Cook, W W Davis, D Ripley, A Walker
- 1990: C E L Ambrose, N A Felton, A Fordham, M A Robinson
- 1991: J G Thomas
- 1992: K M Curran, J P Taylor
- 1994: M B Loye, A L Penberthy
- 1995: A Kumble, R R Montgomerie, R J Warren
- 1999: M L Hayden, D E Malcolm, D J G Sales, G P Swann
- 2000: J F Brown, D M Cousins
- 2001: M E K Hussey
- 2003: T M B Bailey, J W Cook, P A Jaques, A Nel
- 2005: U Afzaal, B J Phillips
- 2006: L Klusener, M S Panesar
- 2007: S D Peters
- 2008: R A White, N Boje
- 2009: J J van der Wath, A J Hall, D S Lucas
- 2011: J D Middlebrook, N J O'Brien, W P J U C Vaas
- 2012: J A Brooks, A G Wakely
- 2013: K J Coetzer, S P Crook, D J Willey
- 2015: M Azharullah
- 2016: R K Kleinveldt, B M Duckett
- 2017: R I Newton, R E Levi, D Murphy
- 2018: J J Cobb, B W Sanderson
- 2019: R I Keogh, A M Rossington
- 2020: L A Procter
- 2021: R S Vasconcelos
- 2025: S A Zaib, L D McManus
- 2026: Y Chahal, N A McSweeney

== Bibliography ==
- Radd, Andrew (February 2001). 100 Greats: Northamptonshire County Cricket Club. Northampton: Tempus Publishing Limited. ISBN 0-7524-2195-6.
