= Buddy Oldfield =

English cricketer and umpire

Personal information
- Full name: Norman Oldfield
- Born: 5 May 1911; Dukinfield, Cheshire, England
- Died: 19 April 1996 (aged 84); Cleveleys, Lancashire, England
- Batting: Right-handed
- Role: Batsman

International information
- National side: England
- Only Test (cap 310): 19 August 1939 v West Indies

Domestic team information
- Years: Team
- 1948–1954: Northamptonshire
- 1935–1939: Lancashire

Career statistics
Competition	Tests	FC
Matches	1	332
Runs scored	99	17,811
Batting average	49.50	37.89
100s/50s	0/1	38/100
Top score	80	168
Balls bowled	0	190
Wickets	0	2
Bowling average	–	60.50
5 wickets in innings	–	0
10 wickets in match	–	0
Best bowling	–	1/0
Catches/stumpings	0/–	96/–
- Source: CricketArchive, 18 December 2008

Norman "Buddy" Oldfield (5 May 1911 – 19 April 1996) was an English cricketer and umpire who played in one Test in 1939 and later umpired in two others. Between 1935 and 1939 he played first-class cricket for Lancashire, before the Second World War interrupted and ended a promising start to his Test career. Oldfield changed clubs and played for Northamptonshire between 1948 and 1954.

== Career ==
=== Lancashire ===
Oldfield joined the Lancashire staff in 1929, but had to wait until 1935 before he could make his debut. His performance prompted Neville Cardus, a cricket journalist, to compare Oldfield's strokeplay to that of Johnny Tyldesley. Oldfield shared in a 271 run partnership with Eddie Paynter when Paynter scored 322 in five hours in 1937 (the innings is the third highest individual score for Lancashire). Oldfield again successfully paired up with Paynter in 1938 when they set a record of 306 for the third wicket; this record stood until 1990 when it was bettered by Michael Atherton and Neil Fairbrother.

On 19 August 1939, Oldfield made his Test debut, aged 28, against the West Indies. He made scores of 80 and 19 in what was his only Test match. A few days after the match ended, the Second World War broke out and he did not play first-class cricket until 1948, and curtailing what could have been a long Test career. He holds the record for most runs by an England player who has played only one Test.

=== Northamptonshire ===
After the war ended and first-class cricket resumed, the 35-year-old Oldfield could not agree terms with Lancashire and left. In later years, he reflected that it had been a mistake to leave Lancashire. In the 151 first-class matches he played for Lancashire, Oldfield scored 7,002 runs at an average of 35.72 with 12 centuries.

Oldfield played for two seasons in the Lancashire League before joining Northamptonshire for the 1948 season. He enjoyed playing against the team that had spurned him, scoring three centuries against Lancashire. In only his second season with Northamptonshire, Oldfield scored 2,192 runs, a record for the team. Oldfield was never given his cap by Lancashire, but was awarded one by Northamptonshire in 1948 for his productive summer. In 1949/50, Oldfield toured India with the Commonwealth XI. Northamptonshire held a benefit year for Oldfield in 1953 which raised £2,728.

Despite his regret about leaving Lancashire, he was more successful for Northamptonshire, scoring 9,321 runs at 38.51 in 159 matches. After retiring from first-class cricket in 1954, Oldfield became an umpire. He umpired between 1954 and 1965 and stood in two Test matches, one in 1960 and one in 1962. He returned to Old Trafford in 1968 when he became Lancashire's coach, and held the position for five years. He died on 19 April 1996.
