= Jock Livingston =

Australian cricketer & rugby league footballer

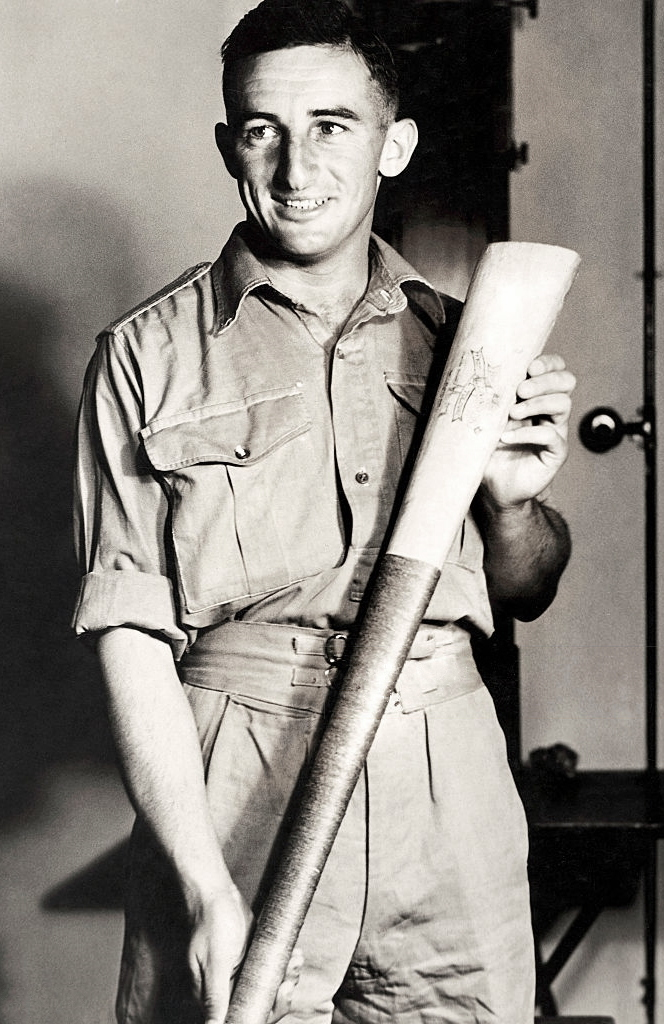
- Livingston with a Samoan Kilikiti bat during military service, c. 1942

Personal information
- Full name: Leonard Livingston
- Born: 3 May 1920; Hurlstone Park, New South Wales, Australia
- Died: 16 January 1998 (aged 77); Sydney, New South Wales, Australia
- Batting: Left-handed
- Bowling: Slow left-arm orthodox

Career statistics
Competition	First-class
Matches	236
Runs scored	15,260
Batting average	45.01
100s/50s	34/79
Top score	210
Balls bowled	138
Wickets	4
Bowling average	12.50
5 wickets in innings	0
10 wickets in match	0
Best bowling	2/22
Catches/stumpings	148/23
- Source: CricketArchive, 15 August 2022
- Rugby league career

Playing information
Club
Years	Team	Pld	T	G	FG	P
1941–43	South Sydney	18	0	13	0	26

Leonard "Jock" Livingston (3 May 1920 – 16 January 1998) was an Australian cricketer who played most of his first-class cricket in England.

== Cricket career ==
Livingston was a hard-hitting left-handed batsman and an occasional wicketkeeper. He played five times for New South Wales with some success, but was not picked for the all-conquering 1948 Australian tour to England, and turned instead to Central Lancashire Cricket League cricket, where he played for Royton Cricket Club, marrying a local girl while there.

In 1949–50, when Marylebone Cricket Club (MCC) declined to tour India, the former England wicketkeeper George Duckworth assembled a Commonwealth side consisting of Lancashire League players plus a handful of English and West Indian cricketers. Livingston captained the side, which included Bill Alley, George Tribe and Frank Worrell. The tour was a big success and the side played five unofficial "Tests" against full Indian Test sides.

At the end of the tour, Livingston was signed as a batsman by Northamptonshire as part of the county's policy to import talented cricketers, a policy that brought in the England captain Freddie Brown from Surrey. Livingston was an immediate success, scoring 1966 runs in his first season, and over the next eight years he was often near the top of the English batting averages. In the three seasons from 1954, he scored more than 2000 runs per season, with a best performance of 2269 runs in 1954 at an average of more than 55 runs per innings. He had a less successful season in 1957 when the county side finished second in the County Championship, its highest ever placing, and he retired at the end of that season, reappearing in just a couple of later, less serious matches, the last in 1964.

Livingston's value was not just in the runs that he scored, but also the style in which he scored them: in a period when defensive batting was commonplace, he hit the ball hard and often, and was no respecter of reputations. His presence at Northamptonshire also attracted other talented players, including fellow Australians George Tribe and Jack Manning and the wicketkeeper Keith Andrew.

== Rugby league ==
Livingston was also a talented rugby league player and spent three seasons playing with South Sydney in the NSWRL from 1941 to 1943.

== Personal and later life ==
In retirement, he worked for the bat-making company Gray-Nicolls. He was Jewish.

== See also ==
- List of select Jewish cricketers
