= Raman Subba Row =

English cricketer (1932–2024)

Raman Subba Row CBE
Personal information
- Full name: Raman Subba Row
- Born: 29 January 1932; Streatham, Surrey, England
- Died: 17 April 2024 (aged 92); Croydon, Surrey, UK
- Batting: Left-handed
- Bowling: Leg-break and googly
- Role: Batsman
- Relatives: D. V. Subba Rao (cousin); Sir M. Venkata Subba Rao

International information
- National side: England
- Test debut (cap 390): 24 July 1958 v New Zealand
- Last Test: 22 August 1961 v Australia

Domestic team information
- Years: Team
- 1951–1953: Cambridge UCC
- 1953–1954: Surrey CCC
- 1955–1961: Northamptonshire CCC

Career statistics
Competition	Test	First-class
Matches	13	260
Runs scored	984	14,182
Batting average	46.85	41.46
100s/50s	3/4	30/73
Top score	137	300
Balls bowled	6	6,243
Wickets	0	87
Bowling average	–	38.65
5 wickets in innings	–	2
10 wickets in match	–	0
Best bowling	–	5/21
Catches/stumpings	5/–	176/–
- Source: Cricinfo, 13 January 2009

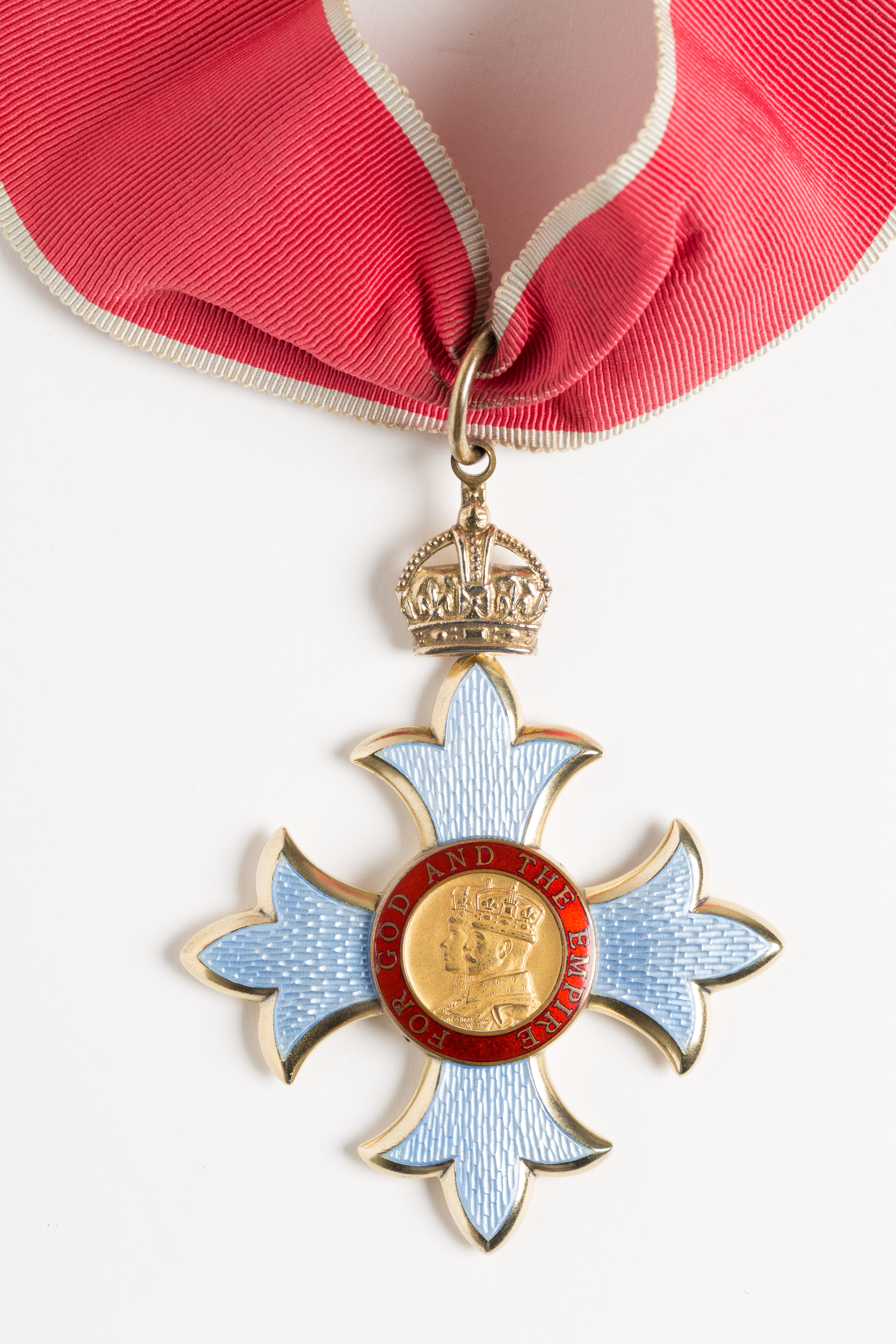
CBE neck decoration

Raman Subba Row CBE (29 January 1932 – 17 April 2024) was a 20th-century Anglo-Indian cricket player and administrator, who played Test cricket for England and captained Northamptonshire CCC (1958–61), later serving as Chairman of the Test and County Cricket Board (1985–90).

== Life and career ==
Born in 1932 at Streatham, Surrey, to an Indian lawyer, Panguluri Venkata Subba Rao from Bapatla, Andhra Pradesh and English mother, Doris Mildred née Pinner, he was educated at Whitgift School before going up to Trinity Hall, Cambridge (MA).

A left-handed opening batsman and occasional leg-spin and googly bowler, Subba Row was a member of the powerful Cambridge University team of the early 1950s and played a few games for Surrey before joining Northamptonshire. In 1958 he succeeded Dennis Brookes as captain, leading the team for four seasons and achieved considerable success as a batsman, scoring Northants' then highest ever innings, 260 not out, in 1955 and bettering it with 300 against Surrey, the County Champions, at The Oval in 1958, where he shared a record sixth wicket stand of 376 with Albert Lightfoot.

Subba Row won thirteen caps regularly opening the batting for England between 1958 and 1961, scoring 984 runs at an average of just under 47. That included 94 in only his second Test against India at The Oval, a century in his third against the West Indies at Georgetown in Guyana, and two more hundreds in The Ashes 1961 series. Both his centuries against Australia, at Edgbaston and The Oval, helped save England from defeat.

Subba Row was named one of the Wisden Cricketers of the Year in 1961. At the end of the 1961 season, he retired rather abruptly from first-class cricket at the age of 29, entering public relations with WS Crawfords advertising agency at Holborn, where he became a director (1963–69).

Having returned to Surrey where he helped drive a programme of ground development, commercial sponsorship and creating long-term income at The Oval, Subba Row is celebrated as a pioneer in cricket marketing.

Chairman of Surrey CCC (1974–78) and an influential figure in the MCC at Lord's, Subba Row later served as Chairman of the TCCB, and as an ICC match referee (1992–2001).

== Family ==
Subba Row married Anne née Harrison in 1960, having two sons and a daughter, as well as eight grandchildren and a great-grandchild.

He died on 17 April 2024, at the age of 92. At the time of his death Subba Row was the oldest surviving England Test cricketer.

Predeceased by his elder son, Christopher, in 2021, his younger son is Alistair Subba Row, chairman of Farebrother and company surveyor to the Haberdashers' Company, who is also a committee member of Marylebone Cricket Club and chairman of Arundel Castle Cricket Foundation; his daughter is Michele Subba Row.

== Awards and honours ==
Appointed Commander of the Order of the British Empire (CBE) in the 1991 New Year Honours, Whitgift School has named a conference room after Subba Row.

== See also ==
- Ashes tour of Australia in 1958–59
- Tallapragada Subba Row
