= Keith Andrew =

English cricketer

Personal information
- Full name: Keith Vincent Andrew
- Born: 15 December 1929; Greenacres, Oldham, England
- Died: 27 December 2010 (aged 81)
- Batting: Right-handed
- Bowling: Right arm leg break
- Role: Wicket-keeper

International information
- National side: England
- Test debut (cap 378): 26 November 1954 v Australia
- Last Test: 6 June 1963 v West Indies

Domestic team information
- Years: Team
- 1952–1966: Northamptonshire

Career statistics
| Competition | Test | FC | LA |
|---|---|---|---|
| Matches | 2 | 390 | 9 |
| Runs scored | 29 | 4230 | 15 |
| Batting average | 9.66 | 13.38 | 3.75 |
| 100s/50s | 0/0 | 0/3 | 0/0 |
| Top score | 15 | 76 | 6* |
| Balls bowled | 0 | 49 | – |
| Wickets | – | 2 | – |
| Bowling average | – | 15.50 | – |
| 5 wickets in innings | – | 0 | – |
| 10 wickets in match | – | 0 | – |
| Best bowling | – | 2/9 | – |
| Catches/stumpings | 1/0 | 723/181 | 6/0 |
- Source: Cricinfo, 11 June 2008

Keith Vincent Andrew (15 December 1929 – 27 December 2010) was an English cricketer who played in two Tests, in 1954–55 and in 1963.

== Life and career ==
Born in Greenacres, Oldham, Lancashire, Andrew was a fine wicketkeeper who might have played more times for England, but for the fact that his batting was never more than adequate, and his career coincided with that of Godfrey Evans. He was recruited out of the Lancashire League by Northamptonshire and became the county's regular wicketkeeper in 1954. He was a success straight away, and Wisden's 1955 edition noted that he was "above the ordinary, a very quick perception enabling him to seize almost every chance".

Andrew was chosen as the second string wicketkeeper to Godfrey Evans on the 1954–55 MCC tour of Australia and New Zealand, and found himself in the Test team for the first match of the tour at Brisbane when Evans was affected by sunstroke. The Test was a disaster for England: captain Len Hutton put the Australians in to bat and they proceeded to make 601 before declaring and winning the match by an innings and 154 runs. A lacklustre fielding performance contributed to the defeat, and Andrew was not innocent: he dropped Arthur Morris off Alec Bedser before he had scored, and Morris went on to make 153.

Evans recovered in time for the second Test, and had one of his best series, so Andrew did not get another chance as England recovered to retain the Ashes. Evans then remained as first-choice wicketkeeper for England in both home and away series for the next four years and when he did finally retire, he was succeeded not by Andrew but by a succession of wicketkeepers with better batting credentials – Roy Swetman, Geoff Millman, John Murray and Jim Parks. Andrew's only other Test came in the first match of the 1963 series against West Indies, when England again fielded out to a big total, this time of more than 500, a follow-on and a heavy defeat.

By the time of his second Test appearance, Andrew was also county captain of Northamptonshire, a post he held for five seasons from 1962. In 1965, he led the county to second place in the County Championship, failing by four points to lead them to their first Championship title, and equalling the highest placing it had achieved. He retired after the 1966 season.

In retirement, Andrew became an influential youth coach and administrator, acting as director of coaching of the National Cricket Association.

Andrew died in December 2010, at the age of 81.

His son Neale (born 1958) is a sculptor whose works include statues and portrait busts of many famous sports people.
