= George Tribe =

Australian sportsman

Personal information
- Full name: George Edward Tribe
- Born: 4 October 1920; Yarraville, Victoria, Australia
- Died: 5 April 2009 (aged 88)
- Height: 5 ft 7 in (1.70 m)
- Batting: Left-handed
- Bowling: Left-arm unorthodox spin
- Role: Bowler

International information
- National side: Australia
- Test debut (cap 172): 29 November 1946 v England
- Last Test: 28 February 1947 v England

Domestic team information
- Years: Team
- 1945/46–1946/47: Victoria
- 1951–1959: Northamptonshire

Career statistics
Competition	Test	First-class
Matches	3	308
Runs scored	35	10,177
Batting average	17.50	27.35
100s/50s	0/0	7/48
Top score	25*	136*
Balls bowled	760	63,651
Wickets	2	1,378
Bowling average	165.00	20.55
5 wickets in innings	0	93
10 wickets in match	0	23
Best bowling	2/48	9/43
Catches/stumpings	0/–	242/–
- Source: CricketArchive, 8 April 2009

George Edward Tribe (4 October 1920 – 5 April 2009) was an Australian cricketer who played in three Test matches from 1946 to 1947, as well as an Australian rules footballer with the Footscray Football Club in the VFL.

== Cricket career ==
Tribe played with great success for Victoria immediately after the Second World War, taking 86 wickets at 19.25 in just 13 games and playing in three Tests under Donald Bradman in the 1946–47 Ashes series. An all-rounder, he bowled slow left-arm orthodox and wrist-spin and batted doggedly as a left-hander, mostly at number six or seven, compiling 7 centuries in his first class career. Despite his prolific record in first-class cricket, he was unsuccessful during the series against England and was dropped from the national team. In the Fifth Test in Sydney Ray Lindwall took 109/9, but thought that Tribe had bowled better, but with no luck to return 153/0.

After failing to achieve further recognition in Australia, Tribe moved to the Lancashire League in 1947. He joined Milnrow in the Central Lancashire League and took 136 scalps in his first season. He followed that performance with a record 148 wickets the following year and 150 in 1950, when he moved to Rawtenstall for two seasons. Although he never toured with Australia he took 99 wickets on a Commonwealth tour of India in 1949/50. An engineer by trade, he joined a Northamptonshire-based firm in 1951 and his prolific record saw Northamptonshire offer him terms for that season. He proved an immediate success and played for the county for nine seasons, achieving "the double" of 1,000 runs and 100 wickets in seven of those seasons. His value to Northamptonshire as the county moved from being one of the weakest teams to being serious challengers for the County Championship was immense. He was awarded his benefit in 1956.

As of 2007, Tribe still holds the Northamptonshire record for best bowling in a first-class match, returning figures of 15–31 (made up of 7–22 and 8–9) against Yorkshire in 1958. He took a record 175 wickets for the county in 1955.

He was a Wisden Cricketer of the Year in 1955. At the time of his death he was the second oldest Australian Test cricketer and the eleventh oldest overall.

== Australian rules career ==
In 1940 Tribe made his debut with the Footscray Football Club in the then-Victorian Football League. He played as a forward and was considered to be a dangerous goalkicker. He went on to play 66 games and kick 80 goals for Footscray before he playing his last game in 1946. He then returned to cricket with the Lancashire League in England.
