= Somerset County Cricket Club first-class matches =

This article is a summary of 2,789 first-class cricket matches played by Somerset County Cricket Club to the end of the 2026 season.

== First-Class Status ==
Somerset is generally regarded as a first-class team from 1882 to 1885 and from their entry into the County Championship in 1891.

The record is complicated by a number of matches that W G Grace played for Gloucestershire against Somerset between 1879 and 1885. Wisden and Playfair recognise all of these as first-class and they are included in Grace's career figures, which have been his accepted figures since 1916 and are used in the Wikipedia article about Grace. The earlier matches in the series are not regarded as first-class by some statisticians and this article on Somerset CCC matches does not include the matches that are in dispute. For more information about this issue, see Variations in First-Class Cricket Statistics.

Some publications also include a match organised by Somerset against Cambridge University at Cambridge in 1892. Somerset only had 10 players and enlisted two additional players (Gregor MacGregor and Norman Cooper) in what became a 12-a-side match (although only 11 players fielded). The match was retitled Cambridge University v H.T. Hewett's XII, Hewett being the captain of the visiting side. The match was won by Hewett's team.

== Notes ==
The 23 inter-county matches played between 1882 and 1885 were before the County Championship started. All inter-county contests since 1891 have been in the Championship except for the following 8 friendly matches:

- 1919 v Worcestershire at Worcester
- 1919 v Worcestershire at Bath
- 1948 v Glamorgan at Newport
- 1949 v Glamorgan at Taunton
- 1950 v Glamorgan at Cardiff (Arms Park)
- 1951 v Glamorgan at Taunton
- 1957 v Sussex at Bristol (Imperial)
- 1957 v Sussex at Hove

Worcestershire did not compete in the Championship in 1919.

All but six of the first-class matches played by Somerset have been eleven-a-side. The six others were twelve-a-side matches played against Oxford University in 1893, 1896, 1899, 1902, 1903 and 1904. Twelve Somerset players played against the South Africans in 1912 when Harry Chidgey was replaced by Bruce Hylton-Stewart after being injured. In 1885 against Hampshire at Southampton, Somerset only had nine players.

Most first-class matches have been of three-day duration. From 1988 to 1992 six Championship matches each season were four-day matches and from 1993 all Championship matches have been of four days. The first four-day non-championship match was that against the Australians in 1997. Since then the matches against New Zealand (1999), West Indies (2000), Australians (2001), and Sri Lanka A (2004) have been four-day matches. Four matches against M.C.C. between 1882 and 1891 were two-day matches as were the 15 matches played in 1919.

Two matches played under the single-innings rule for matches which have delayed starts have ended in results, both defeats for Somerset. The 1954 victory by Yorkshire at Bradford is included as a draw while the 1986 victory by Derbyshire at Taunton is included as a defeat for Somerset. This is in line with the Championship tables at the time.

== Summary against each opponent ==
In the following table the County Championship summary is limited to matches played from 1891. Inter-County matches played between 1882 and 1885 are listed separately as are County friendly matches. Bob Willis Trophy games are included in the County Championship totals.

Opponent	Seasons		Home						Away						All					
Opponent	First	Last	P	W	L	D	T	A	P	W	L	D	T	A	P	W	L	D	T	A
Derbyshire	1912	2013	62	18	27	17	–	2	66	18	24	24	–	–	128	36	51	41	–	2
Durham	1992	2025	19	10	3	6	–	–	20	4	7	9	–	–	39	14	9	16	–	–
Essex	1895	2026	77	17	29	30	–	1	78	23	32	22	1	–	155	40	61	53	1	1
Glamorgan	1921	2026	76	23	18	35	–	–	74	16	26	32	–	1	150	39	44	67	–	1
Gloucestershire	1891	2022	102	36	30	36	–	–	99	23	39	37	–	1	201	59	69	73	–	1
Hampshire	1895	2026	105	25	33	47	–	1	107	28	38	41	–	–	212	53	71	88	–	1
Kent	1891	2024	84	26	30	28	–	–	83	16	48	19	–	–	167	42	78	47	–	–
Lancashire	1891	2024	81	18	37	25	1	1	81	8	42	31	–	1	162	26	79	56	1	2
Leicestershire	1920	2026	51	19	10	22	–	–	53	16	18	19	–	–	104	35	28	41	–	–
Middlesex	1891	2023	83	17	39	27	–	–	83	11	46	26	–	–	166	28	85	53	–	–
Northamptonshire	1912	2023	61	20	18	23	–	1	64	13	18	33	–	–	125	33	36	56	–	1
Nottinghamshire	1892	2026	70	25	13	32	–	–	70	15	20	35	–	–	140	40	40	67	–	–
Surrey	1891	2026	91	23	30	38	–	–	91	12	50	29	–	–	182	35	80	67	–	–
Sussex	1892	2026	92	27	25	39	1	–	92	22	41	29	–	1	184	49	66	68	1	1
Warwickshire	1905	2026	74	27	20	27	–	–	74	12	21	41	–	–	148	39	41	68	–	–
Worcestershire	1901	2025	90	30	32	28	–	–	90	28	26	34	1	1	180	58	58	62	1	1
Yorkshire	1891	2026	94	15	42	37	–	–	90	12	53	25	–	–	184	27	95	62	–	–
County Championship			1317	376	436	497	2	6	1319	277	548	487	2	5	2636	651	984	986	4	11
Gloucestershire	1882	1885	2	0	2	0	–	–	3	0	3	0	–	–	5	0	5	0	–	–
Hampshire	1882	1885	4	4	0	0	–	–	4	0	4	0	–	–	8	4	4	0	–	–
Kent	1884		1	0	1	0	–	–	1	0	1	0	–	–	2	0	2	0	–	–
Lancashire	1882	1884	2	0	2	0	–	–	2	0	2	0	–	–	4	0	4	0	–	–
Surrey	1883	1885	2	0	2	0	–	–	2	0	2	0	–	–	4	0	4	0	–	–
Inter-County 1882–1885			11	4	7	0	0	0	12	0	12	0	0	0	23	4	19	0	0	0
Glamorgan	1948	1951	2	0	0	2	–	–	2	0	1	1	–	–	4	0	1	3	–	–
Sussex	1957		1	0	0	1	–	–	1	0	1	0	–	–	2	0	1	1	–	–
Worcestershire	1919		1	1	0	0	–	–	1	0	0	1	–	–	2	1	0	1	–	–
County Friendlies			4	1	0	3	0	0	4	0	2	2	0	0	8	1	2	5	0	0
Oxford University	1892	2000	4	3	1	0	–	–	28	7	10	11	–	1	32	10	11	11	–	1
Cambridge University	1895	2008	14	6	3	5	–	–	13	4	4	5	–	–	27	10	7	10	–	–
Cardiff MCCU	2012	2019	2	1	0	1	–	–							2	1	0	1	–	–
Durham MCCU	2005	2015	2	0	0	2	–	–							2	0	0	2	–	–
Leeds/Bradford MCCU	2014		1	0	0	1	–	–							1	0	0	1	–	–
Loughborough UCCE	2003	2007	3	1	0	2	–	–							3	1	0	2	–	–
Australians	1882	2013	29	1	16	12	–	–							29	1	16	12	–	–
Indians	1911	2011	11	2	2	7	–	–							11	2	2	7	–	–
New Zealanders	1927	2015	13	0	6	7	–	–							13	0	6	7	–	–
Pakistanis	1954	2016	8	1	3	4	–	–							8	1	3	4	–	–
South Africans	1901	2008	13	1	10	2	–	–							13	1	10	2	–	–
Sri Lankans	1991	1998	2	0	1	1	–	–							2	0	1	1	–	–
West Indians	1923	2000	17	2	8	7	–	–							17	2	8	7	–	–
MCC	1882	1891	2	1	0	1	–	–	2	0	1	1	–	–	4	1	1	2	–	–
Philadelphians	1897	1903	2	1	0	1	–	–							2	1	0	1	–	–
Australian Imperial Forces	1919		1	0	1	0	–	–							1	0	1	0	–	–
Combined Services	1959		1	1	0	0	–	–							1	1	0	0	–	–
Pakistan Eaglets	1963		1	0	0	1	–	–							1	0	0	1	–	–
Young Australians	1995		1	0	1	0	–	–							1	0	1	0	–	–
South Africa 'A'	1996		1	0	0	1	–	–							1	0	0	1	–	–
Pakistan 'A'	1997		1	0	1	0	–	–							1	0	1	0	–	–
West Indies 'A'	2002		1	0	0	0	1	–							1	0	0	0	1	–
Sri Lanka 'A'	2004		1	1	0	0	–	–							1	1	0	0	–	–
All First-Class	1882	2026	1458	398	497	554	3	6	1397	286	597	506	2	6	2827	688	1068	1056	5	12

The match against Oxford Universities in 2000 (which included Oxford Brookes University) is included here in the Oxford University totals. The match in 2008 against Cambridge University UCCE is included here in the Cambridge University totals.

== Summary on each home ground ==
Currently first-class matches are only played at Taunton. Only 2 other first-class matches have been played on the following grounds. These were matches played at Taunton between East Africa and Sri Lanka, after both teams had played in the 1975 World Cup, and a West Indies A v India A match in 2018. Bob Willis Trophy games are included in the County Championship totals.

In the following table click on the 'CA' to access the Cricket Archive Records section for the ground.

Venue	Records	Seasons		County Championship						Other						All First-Class					
Venue	Records	First	Last	P	W	L	D	T	A	P	W	L	D	T	A	P	W	L	D	T	A
Taunton, County Ground	CA	1882	2026	814	230	260	320	2	2	118	20	48	49	1	–	929	250	308	369	3	2
Bath, Recreation Ground	CA	1897	2006	234	71	82	81	–	4	21	6	8	7	–	–	255	77	90	88	–	4
Bath, Lansdown CC (Combe Park)	CA	1884								1	1	0	0	–	–	1	1	0	0	–	–
Bristol, Imperial Athletic Ground	CA	1957	1966	8	2	2	4	–	–	1	0	0	1	–	–	9	2	2	5	–	–
Frome, Agricultural Showgrounds	CA	1932	1961	18	9	7	2	–	–							18	9	7	2	–	–
Glastonbury, Morlands Athletic Ground	CA	1952	1973	18	5	2	11	–	–							18	5	2	11	–	–
Knowle, Knowle CC	CA	1926	1928	3	1	1	1	–	–							3	1	1	1	–	–
Stratton-on-the-Fosse, Downside School	CA	1934		1	0	0	1	–	–							1	0	0	1	–	–
Street, Millfield School	CA	1961		1	0	1	0	–	–							1	0	1	0	–	–
Taunton, Taunton Vale	CA	2012	2015							2	0	0	2	–	–	2	0	0	2	–	–
Wells, Rowden Road	CA	1935	1951	11	4	5	2	–	–							11	4	5	2	–	–
Weston-super-Mare, Clarence Park	CA	1914	1996	188	51	69	68	–	–	3	0	3	0	–	–	191	51	72	68	–	–
Yeovil, West Hendford	CA	1935	1939	5	1	3	1	–	–							5	1	3	1	–	–
Yeovil, Johnson Park	CA	1951	1967	12	2	4	6	–	–							12	2	4	6	–	–
Totals		1882	2026	1317	376	436	497	2	6	146	27	59	59	1	0	1463	403	495	556	3	6

Between 1882 and 1885 10 inter-county home matches were played at Taunton (3 won, 7 lost) and 1 at Bath, Lansdown CC (won). Since 1891 2 friendly inter-county home matches have been played at Taunton (2 drawn), 1 at Bath, Recreation Ground (won) and 1 at Bristol, Imperial Athletic Ground (drawn).

== Season by season summary ==
In the following table the final position is given together with the number of teams in the County Championship so that 5=/9 means that Somerset were equal 5th out of the 9 teams competing. From 2000 the County Championship has been divided into two divisions shown here as D1 for Division 1 and D2 for Division 2. Bob Willis Trophy games are included in the County Championship totals.

	County Championship																			All First-Class					
	Home						Away						All						Position	All First-Class					
Year	P	W	L	D	T	A	P	W	L	D	T	A	P	W	L	D	T	A	Position	P	W	L	D	T	A
1882																				8	1	6	1	–	–
1883																				7	1	5	1	–	–
1884																				6	1	5	0	–	–
1885																				6	1	5	0	–	–
1891	6	2	4	0	–	–	6	3	2	1	–	–	12	5	6	1	–	–	5=/9	13	6	6	1	–	–
1892	8	5	1	2	–	–	8	3	4	1	–	–	16	8	5	3	–	–	3/9	17	8	6	3	–	–
1893	8	2	2	4	–	–	8	2	6	0	–	–	16	4	8	4	–	–	8/9	18	5	9	4	–	–
1894	8	3	2	3	–	–	8	3	5	0	–	–	16	6	7	3	–	–	6/9	17	6	7	4	–	–
1895	9	5	3	1	–	–	8	1	5	2	–	1	17	6	8	3	–	1	8=/14	19	6	10	3	–	1
1896	8	1	3	4	–	–	8	2	4	2	–	–	16	3	7	6	–	–	11/14	19	3	9	7	–	–
1897	8	2	4	2	–	–	8	1	5	2	–	–	16	3	9	4	–	–	11/14	18	3	10	5	–	–
1898	8	0	4	4	–	–	8	1	6	1	–	–	16	1	10	5	–	–	13=/14	17	2	10	5	–	–
1899	8	2	3	3	–	–	8	0	5	3	–	–	16	2	8	6	–	–	13=/15	18	2	9	7	–	–
1900	8	2	5	1	–	–	8	2	6	0	–	–	16	4	11	1	–	–	11/15	17	4	11	2	–	–
1901	9	2	4	3	–	–	8	2	6	0	–	1	17	4	10	3	–	1	12=/15	19	6	10	3	–	1
1902	9	4	2	3	–	–	9	3	5	1	–	–	18	7	7	4	–	–	7=/15	20	7	7	6	–	–
1903	8	3	1	4	–	1	9	3	5	1	–	–	17	6	6	5	–	1	10/15	19	7	6	6	–	1
1904	9	3	5	1	–	–	9	2	6	1	–	–	18	5	11	2	–	–	12/15	20	5	13	2	–	–
1905	9	1	4	4	–	–	9	0	6	3	–	–	18	1	10	7	–	–	15/16	19	1	10	8	–	–
1906	9	2	4	3	–	–	9	2	6	1	–	–	18	4	10	4	–	–	11=/16	18	4	10	4	–	–
1907	9	3	6	0	–	–	9	0	6	3	–	–	18	3	12	3	–	–	14/16	19	3	13	3	–	–
1908	10	1	5	4	–	–	10	1	8	1	–	–	20	2	13	5	–	–	16/16	20	2	13	5	–	–
1909	8	2	3	3	–	–	8	2	4	2	–	–	16	4	7	5	–	–	11/16	17	4	8	5	–	–
1910	9	0	8	1	–	–	9	0	7	2	–	–	18	0	15	3	–	–	16/16	18	0	15	3	–	–
1911	8	1	6	1	–	–	8	0	7	1	–	–	16	1	13	2	–	–	16/16	17	1	14	2	–	–
1912	8	1	4	3	–	–	8	1	4	3	–	–	16	2	8	6	–	–	14/16	18	2	9	7	–	–
1913	8	1	4	3	–	–	8	1	7	0	–	–	16	2	11	3	–	–	16/16	16	2	11	3	–	–
1914	9	2	7	0	–	1	10	1	9	0	–	–	19	3	16	0	–	1	15/16	19	3	16	0	–	1
1919	6	3	1	1	1	–	6	1	2	3	–	–	12	4	3	4	1	–	5=/15	15	5	4	5	1	–
1920	10	4	6	0	–	–	10	3	4	3	–	–	20	7	10	3	–	–	10/16	22	7	11	4	–	–
1921	11	3	6	2	–	–	11	5	5	1	–	–	22	8	11	3	–	–	10/17	25	8	14	3	–	–
1922	12	3	8	1	–	–	12	3	3	6	–	–	24	6	11	7	–	–	10/17	25	6	12	7	–	–
1923	12	5	5	2	–	–	12	4	6	2	–	–	24	9	11	4	–	–	9/17	25	9	12	4	–	–
1924	11	3	5	3	–	1	11	6	2	3	–	1	22	9	7	6	–	2	8/17	24	10	8	6	–	2
1925	13	0	8	5	–	–	13	3	7	3	–	–	26	3	15	8	–	–	15/17	27	3	16	8	–	–
1926	13	1	4	8	–	–	13	2	5	5	1	–	26	3	9	13	1	–	14/17	27	3	10	13	1	–
1927	13	1	4	8	–	–	13	2	5	6	–	–	26	3	9	14	–	–	14/17	27	3	10	14	–	–
1928	12	1	5	6	–	–	12	3	6	3	–	–	24	4	11	9	–	–	14/17	25	4	11	10	–	–
1929	14	3	8	3	–	–	14	0	9	5	–	–	28	3	17	8	–	–	15/17	30	4	18	8	–	–
1930	14	4	3	7	–	–	14	0	8	6	–	–	28	4	11	13	–	–	13=/17	30	4	12	14	–	–
1931	14	3	5	6	–	–	14	3	6	5	–	–	28	6	11	11	–	–	13/17	29	6	11	12	–	–
1932	14	6	3	5	–	–	14	2	4	8	–	–	28	8	7	13	–	–	7/17	29	8	8	13	–	–
1933	13	3	4	6	–	–	13	3	6	4	–	–	26	6	10	10	–	–	11/17	27	6	10	11	–	–
1934	12	2	4	6	–	–	12	1	6	5	–	–	24	3	10	11	–	–	15/17	25	3	11	11	–	–
1935	13	2	6	5	–	–	13	3	5	5	–	–	26	5	11	10	–	–	14/17	28	5	13	10	–	–
1936	13	6	3	4	–	–	13	3	7	3	–	–	26	9	10	7	–	–	7/17	28	10	10	8	–	–
1937	14	4	7	3	–	–	14	3	7	4	–	–	28	7	14	7	–	–	13/17	29	7	15	7	–	–
1938	14	8	2	4	–	–	14	2	7	5	–	–	28	10	9	9	–	–	7/17	29	10	10	9	–	–
1939	14	3	6	5	–	–	14	3	5	5	1	–	28	6	11	10	1	–	14/17	30	8	11	10	1	–
1946	13	7	1	5	–	–	13	5	5	3	–	–	26	12	6	8	–	–	4/17	28	14	6	8	–	–
1947	13	6	5	2	–	–	13	2	7	4	–	–	26	8	12	6	–	–	11=/17	28	8	13	7	–	–
1948	13	2	9	2	–	–	13	3	5	5	–	–	26	5	14	7	–	–	12/17	29	5	17	7	–	–
1949	13	5	8	0	–	–	13	3	7	3	–	–	26	8	15	3	–	–	9/17	29	8	16	5	–	–
1950	14	5	5	4	–	–	14	3	3	8	–	–	28	8	8	12	–	–	7=/17	30	8	9	13	–	–
1951	14	3	8	3	–	–	14	2	7	5	–	–	28	5	15	8	–	–	14/17	30	5	16	9	–	–
1952	14	2	5	7	–	–	14	0	7	7	–	–	28	2	12	14	–	–	17/17	29	2	12	15	–	–
1953	14	1	10	3	–	–	14	1	9	4	–	–	28	2	19	7	–	–	17/17	29	2	19	8	–	–
1954	14	1	9	4	–	–	14	1	9	4	–	–	28	2	18	8	–	–	17/17	29	2	18	9	–	–
1955	14	4	6	4	–	–	14	0	11	3	–	–	28	4	17	7	–	–	17/17	29	4	18	7	–	–
1956	14	4	5	5	–	–	14	0	10	4	–	–	28	4	15	9	–	–	15/17	30	4	15	11	–	–
1957	14	4	6	4	–	–	14	5	8	1	–	–	28	9	14	5	–	–	8/17	32	9	15	8	–	–
1958	14	8	5	1	–	–	14	4	4	6	–	–	28	12	9	7	–	–	3/17	29	12	10	7	–	–
1959	14	7	4	3	–	–	14	1	9	4	–	–	28	8	13	7	–	–	12/17	31	10	13	8	–	–
1960	16	1	6	9	–	–	16	4	5	7	–	–	32	5	11	16	–	–	14/17	34	5	13	16	–	–
1961	16	5	6	5	–	–	16	5	9	2	–	–	32	10	15	7	–	–	10/17	34	11	15	8	–	–
1962	16	6	3	7	–	–	16	6	4	6	–	–	32	12	7	13	–	–	6/17	34	14	7	13	–	–
1963	14	4	2	8	–	–	14	6	4	4	–	–	28	10	6	12	–	–	3/17	31	10	7	14	–	–
1964	14	4	5	5	–	–	14	4	3	7	–	–	28	8	8	12	–	–	8/17	29	8	9	12	–	–
1965	14	7	5	2	–	–	14	1	6	7	–	–	28	8	11	9	–	–	7/17	30	9	11	10	–	–
1966	14	7	5	2	–	–	14	6	2	6	–	–	28	13	7	8	–	–	3/17	30	14	7	9	–	–
1967	14	3	3	8	–	–	14	2	4	8	–	–	28	5	7	16	–	–	8/17	30	5	8	17	–	–
1968	13	2	7	4	–	1	14	3	4	7	–	–	27	5	11	11	–	1	12/17	29	5	11	13	–	1
1969	12	1	3	8	–	–	12	0	6	6	–	–	24	1	9	14	–	–	17/17	25	1	10	14	–	–
1970	12	3	4	5	–	–	12	2	6	4	–	–	24	5	10	9	–	–	13/17	24	5	10	9	–	–
1971	12	6	0	6	–	–	12	1	4	7	–	–	24	7	4	13	–	–	7/17	25	7	4	14	–	–
1972	10	0	1	9	–	–	10	4	1	5	–	–	20	4	2	14	–	–	11/17	21	4	2	15	–	–
1973	10	5	0	5	–	–	10	2	2	6	–	–	20	7	2	11	–	–	10/17	21	7	2	12	–	–
1974	10	5	2	3	–	–	10	1	2	7	–	–	20	6	4	10	–	–	5/17	23	6	5	12	–	–
1975	10	1	3	6	–	–	10	3	5	2	–	–	20	4	8	8	–	–	12/17	22	5	9	8	–	–
1976	10	4	4	2	–	–	10	3	4	3	–	–	20	7	8	5	–	–	7/17	22	7	9	6	–	–
1977	10	4	2	4	–	1	11	2	2	7	–	–	21	6	4	11	–	1	4/17	22	7	4	11	–	1
1978	11	7	2	2	–	–	11	2	2	7	–	–	22	9	4	9	–	–	5/17	24	9	4	11	–	–
1979	11	4	0	7	–	–	10	1	1	8	–	1	21	5	1	15	–	1	8/17	24	6	1	17	–	1
1980	10	2	3	5	–	1	11	1	2	8	–	–	21	3	5	13	–	1	5/17	23	4	5	14	–	1
1981	11	4	2	5	–	–	11	6	0	5	–	–	22	10	2	10	–	–	3/17	24	11	2	11	–	–
1982	11	2	3	6	–	–	11	4	3	4	–	–	22	6	6	10	–	–	6/17	23	6	6	11	–	–
1983	12	1	3	8	–	–	12	2	4	6	–	–	24	3	7	14	–	–	10/17	25	3	7	15	–	1
1984	12	3	1	8	–	–	12	3	6	3	–	–	24	6	7	11	–	–	7/17	26	7	8	11	–	–
1985	12	1	4	7	–	–	12	0	3	9	–	–	24	1	7	16	–	–	17/17	27	1	8	18	–	–
1986	12	3	4	5	–	–	11	0	3	8	–	1	23	3	7	13	–	1	16/17	25	3	7	15	–	1
1987	12	2	1	9	–	–	12	0	2	10	–	–	24	2	3	19	–	–	11/17	24	2	3	19	–	–
1988	11	1	4	6	–	–	11	4	2	5	–	–	22	5	6	11	–	–	11/17	23	5	7	11	–	–
1989	11	3	3	5	–	–	11	1	3	7	–	–	22	4	6	12	–	–	14/17	23	4	6	13	–	–
1990	11	2	3	6	–	–	11	1	1	9	–	–	22	3	4	15	–	–	15/17	24	3	5	16	–	–
1991	11	1	2	8	–	–	11	1	3	7	–	–	22	2	5	15	–	–	17/17	24	2	6	16	–	–
1992	11	4	1	6	–	–	11	1	3	7	–	–	22	5	4	13	–	–	9/18	23	5	5	13	–	–
1993	8	4	4	0	–	–	9	4	3	2	–	–	17	8	7	2	–	–	5/18	18	8	8	2	–	–
1994	9	6	2	1	–	–	8	1	5	2	–	–	17	7	7	3	–	–	11/18	18	7	7	4	–	–
1995	8	3	3	2	–	–	9	4	2	3	–	–	17	7	5	5	–	–	9/18	20	7	7	6	–	–
1996	9	3	3	3	–	–	8	2	3	3	–	–	17	5	6	6	–	–	11/18	19	5	7	7	–	–
1997	8	1	2	5	–	–	9	2	1	6	–	–	17	3	3	11	–	–	12/18	20	4	4	12	–	–
1998	9	4	2	3	–	–	8	2	5	1	–	–	17	6	7	4	–	–	9/18	18	6	7	5	–	–
1999	8	4	1	3	–	–	9	2	3	4	–	–	17	6	4	7	–	–	4/18	19	6	5	8	–	–
2000	8	1	0	7	–	–	8	1	4	3	–	–	16	2	4	10	–	–	5/9(D1)	18	4	4	10	–	–
2001	8	3	1	4	–	–	8	3	1	4	–	–	16	6	2	8	–	–	2/9(D1)	17	6	3	8	–	–
2002	8	1	2	5	–	–	8	0	5	3	–	–	16	1	7	8	–	–	8/9(D1)	17	1	7	8	1	–
2003	8	3	2	3	–	–	8	1	6	1	–	–	16	4	8	4	–	–	7/9(D2)	18	4	8	6	–	–
2004	8	1	3	4	–	–	8	3	2	3	–	–	16	4	5	7	–	–	4/9(D2)	18	5	5	8	–	–
2005	8	1	4	3	–	–	8	3	3	2	–	–	16	4	7	5	–	–	8/9(D2)	17	4	7	6	–	–
2006	8	1	4	3	–	–	8	2	5	1	–	–	16	3	9	4	–	–	9/9(D2)	16	3	9	4	–	–
2007	8	5	0	3	–	–	8	5	1	2	–	–	16	10	1	5	–	–	1/9(D2)	17	11	1	5	–	–
2008	8	1	2	5	–	–	8	2	0	6	–	–	16	3	2	11	–	–	4/9(D1)	18	4	2	12	–	–
2009	8	1	0	7	–	–	8	2	1	5	–	–	16	3	1	12	–	–	3/9(D1)	16	3	1	12	–	–
2010	8	4	0	4	–	–	8	2	2	4	–	–	16	6	2	8	–	–	2/9(D1)	16	6	2	8	–	–
2011	8	4	3	1	–	–	8	2	4	2	–	–	16	6	7	3	–	–	4/9(D1)	17	6	7	4	–	–
2012	8	4	0	4	–	–	8	1	1	6	–	–	16	5	1	10	–	–	2/9(D1)	17	5	1	11	–	–
2013	8	1	3	4	–	–	8	2	2	4	–	–	16	3	5	8	–	–	6/9(D1)	17	3	6	8	–	–
2014	8	2	1	5	–	–	8	2	1	5	–	–	16	4	2	10	–	–	6/9(D1)	17	4	2	11	–	–
2015	8	2	2	4	–	–	8	2	4	2	–	–	16	4	6	6	–	–	6/9(D1)	18	4	7	7	–	–
2016	8	4	1	3	–	–	8	2	0	6	–	–	16	6	1	9	–	–	2/9(D1)	17	6	1	10	–	–
2017	7	2	3	2	–	–	7	2	3	2	–	–	14	4	6	4	–	–	6/8(D1)	14	4	6	4	–	–
2018	7	4	0	2	1	–	7	3	2	2	–	–	14	7	2	4	1	–	2/8(D1)	14	7	2	4	1	–
2019	7	5	0	2	0	–	7	4	3	0	–	–	14	9	3	2	0	–	2/8(D1)	15	10	3	2	0	–
2020	2	2	0	0	0	–	3	2	0	1	–	–	6	4	0	2	0	–	Runner-up	6	4	0	2	0	–
2021	7	1	3	3	0	–	7	3	2	2	–	–	14	4	5	5	0	–	6/6(D1)	14	4	5	5	0	–
2022	7	2	3	2	0	–	7	1	3	3	–	–	14	3	6	5	0	–	7/10(D1)	14	3	6	5	0	–
2023	7	1	1	5	0	–	7	2	3	2	–	–	14	3	4	7	0	–	7/10(D1)	14	3	4	7	0	–
2024	7	5	1	1	0	–	7	0	2	5	–	–	14	5	3	6	0	–	3/10(D1)	14	5	3	6	0	–
2025	7	3	0	4	0	–	7	1	3	3	–	–	14	4	3	7	0	–	3/10(D1)	14	4	3	7	0	–
2026	7	2	1	4	0	–	7	4	2	1	–	–	14	6	3	5	0	–	2/10(D1)	14	6	3	5	0	–
Totals	1317	376	436	497	2	6	1319	277	548	487	2	5	2636	653	984	984	4	11		2843	691	1072	1063	5	12

== Abandoned matches ==
- 1895 v Lancashire at Manchester
- 1901 v Worcestershire at Worcester
- 1903 v Hampshire at Bath
- 1914 v Northamptonshire at Taunton
- 1924 v Essex at Bath
- 1924 v Glamorgan at Cardiff
- 1968 v Derbyshire at Bath
- 1977 v Derbyshire at Taunton
- 1979 v Gloucestershire at Bristol
- 1980 v Lancashire at Bath
- 1983 v Oxford University at Oxford
- 1986 v Sussex at Horsham

All these matches were abandoned because of bad weather, except for the match in 1914 which was abandoned because of the impending war.
