= List of the competitive honours won by county cricket clubs in England and Wales =

This is a list of the competitive honours won by county cricket clubs in England and Wales. It lists every club to have won any of the five domestic trophies.

These honours consist of the County Championship, the Royal London One-Day Cup, the Friends Provident Trophy, the Benson & Hedges Cup and the T20 Blast and their various former incarnations.

The County Championship's first season was 1890, and was the sole competition in county cricket for more than seventy years. The competition began with eight counties, which increased to fifteen by the end of the 19th century. Northamptonshire and Glamorgan joined in the first quarter of the twentieth century, since which time only Durham have added to the ranks.

The Gillette Cup was inaugurated in 1962 as the first limited overs competition. It began as a 65-over contest, and would undergo various name changes over its 36-year lifespan, with its time as the NatWest Trophy lasting the longest. The rules were often altered as well: number of overs was varied, minor counties were invited to compete, and in 2006 a group stage was introduced.

The Sunday League began in 1969 as 40-over competition. Like the Gillette Cup, its format and name changed on a regular basis. It was the first county tournament to feature the white ball, coloured kits, and team nicknames. In 2010 the league and the Friends Provident Trophy (the latest successor of the Gillette Cup) were merged to form one tournament, with both a league and knockout stage.

The Benson & Hedges Cup was introduced in 1972 and lasted 30 years with the same sponsor. In its initial format, twenty teams were organised into four zonal groups in its original format with the games played at the start of the season in May. Various other teams made up the numbers, with 17 (and later 18) counties being joined by 2-3 extra sides. The first two teams in each group went on to contest a quarter-final knock-out stage. From 1993-1994 and in 1999, the tournament was a straight knockout tournament. The group stage returned between 1995 and 1998, and for the last three years of the tournament.

The Twenty20 Cup was created in 2003 and was based on three divisions of six teams, who played each other once (twice from 2008), with the top 8 teams qualifying for the quarter-finals. In 2010 the tournament was renamed the Friends Provident t20 (later the Friends Life t20) and the 3 groups of six teams were changed to two groups of 9, and then back again for 2012 and 2013. The current tournament, the t20 Blast, begun in 2014, has again returned to having groups of 9, with the top four teams from each group qualifying for the quarter-finals.

== List ==
Year	County Championship	Sunday League / Pro40 / ECB 40 Royal London One-Day Cup	Gillette Cup / NatWest Trophy / C&G Trophy / FP Trophy	B&H Cup	Twenty20 Cup / Friends Life t20 / t20 Blast
1890	Surrey (1)				
1891	Surrey (2)				
1892	Surrey (3)				
1893	Yorkshire (1)				
1894	Surrey (4)				
1895	Surrey (5)				
1896	Yorkshire (2)				
1897	Lancashire (1)				
1898	Yorkshire (3)				
1899	Surrey (6)				
1900	Yorkshire (4)				
1901	Yorkshire (5)				
1902	Yorkshire (6)				
1903	Middlesex (1)				
1904	Lancashire (2)				
1905	Yorkshire (7)				
1906	Kent (1)				
1907	Nottinghamshire (1)				
1908	Yorkshire (8)				
1909	Kent (2)				
1910	Kent (3)				
1911	Warwickshire (1)				
1912	Yorkshire (9)				
1913	Kent (4)				
1914	Surrey (7)				
1915–1918	No competition due to World War I				
1919	Yorkshire (10)				
1920	Middlesex (2)				
1921	Middlesex (3)				
1922	Yorkshire (11)				
1923	Yorkshire (12)				
1924	Yorkshire (13)				
1925	Yorkshire (14)				
1926	Lancashire (3)				
1927	Lancashire (4)				
1928	Lancashire (5)				
1929	Nottinghamshire (2)				
1930	Lancashire (6)				
1931	Yorkshire (15)				
1932	Yorkshire (16)				
1933	Yorkshire (17)				
1934	Lancashire (7)				
1935	Yorkshire (18)				
1936	Derbyshire (1)				
1937	Yorkshire (19)				
1938	Yorkshire (20)				
1939	Yorkshire (21)				
1940–1945	No competition due to World War II				
1946	Yorkshire (22)				
1947	Middlesex (4)				
1948	Glamorgan (1)				
1949	Middlesex, Yorkshire (Note: The County Championship title was shared in 1949, 1950 and 1977.)				
1950	Lancashire, Surrey				
1951	Warwickshire (2)				
1952	Surrey (8)				
1953	Surrey (9)				
1954	Surrey (10)				
1955	Surrey (11)				
1956	Surrey (12)				
1957	Surrey (13)				
1958	Surrey (14)				
1959	Yorkshire (23)				
1960	Yorkshire (24)				
1961	Hampshire (1)				
1962	Yorkshire (25)				
1963	Yorkshire (26)		Sussex (1)		
1964	Worcestershire (1)		Sussex (2)		
1965	Worcestershire (2)		Yorkshire (1)		
1966	Yorkshire (27)		Warwickshire (1)		
1967	Yorkshire (28)		Kent (1)		
1968	Yorkshire (29)		Warwickshire (2)		
1969	Glamorgan (2)	Lancashire (1)	Yorkshire (2)		
1970	Kent (5)	Lancashire (2)	Lancashire (1)		
1971	Surrey (15)	Worcestershire (1)	Lancashire (2)		
1972	Warwickshire (3)	Kent (1)	Lancashire (3)	Leicestershire (1)	
1973	Hampshire (2)	Kent (2)	Gloucestershire (1)	Kent (1)	
1974	Worcestershire (3)	Leicestershire (1)	Kent (2)	Surrey (1)	
1975	Leicestershire (1)	Hampshire (1)	Lancashire (4)	Leicestershire (2)	
1976	Middlesex (5)	Kent (3)	Northamptonshire (1)	Kent (2)	
1977	Kent, Middlesex	Leicestershire (2)	Middlesex (1)	Gloucestershire (1)	
1978	Kent (6)	Hampshire (2)	Sussex (3)	Kent (3)	
1979	Essex (1)	Somerset (1)	Somerset (1)	Essex (1)	
1980	Middlesex (6)	Warwickshire (1)	Middlesex (2)	Northamptonshire (1)	
1981	Nottinghamshire (3)	Essex (1)	Derbyshire	Somerset (1)	
1982	Middlesex (7)	Sussex (1)	Surrey	Somerset (2)	
1983	Essex (2)	Yorkshire	Somerset (2)	Middlesex (1)	
1984	Essex (3)	Essex (2)	Middlesex (3)	Lancashire (1)	
1985	Middlesex (8)	Essex (3)	Essex (1)	Leicestershire (3)	
1986	Essex (4)	Hampshire (3)	Sussex (4)	Middlesex (2)	
1987	Nottinghamshire (4)	Worcestershire (2)	Nottinghamshire	Yorkshire	
1988	Worcestershire (4)	Worcestershire (3) (Note: Between 1988 and 1991, the Refuge Assurance Cup, a play-off between the top four teams in the league, was held. The winners were Lancashire (1988), Essex (1989), Middlesex (1990) and Worcestershire (1991).)	Middlesex (4)	Hampshire (1)	
1989	Worcestershire (5)	Lancashire (3)	Warwickshire (3)	Nottinghamshire	
1990	Middlesex (9)	Derbyshire	Lancashire (5)	Lancashire (2)	
1991	Essex (5)	Nottinghamshire (1)	Hampshire (1)	Worcestershire	
1992	Essex (6)	Middlesex (1)	Northamptonshire (2)	Hampshire (2)	
1993	Middlesex (10)	Glamorgan (1)	Warwickshire (4)	Derbyshire	
1994	Warwickshire (4)	Warwickshire (2)	Worcestershire	Warwickshire (1)	
1995	Warwickshire (5)	Kent (4)	Warwickshire (5)	Lancashire (3)	
1996	Leicestershire (2)	Surrey (1)	Lancashire (6)	Lancashire (4)	
1997	Glamorgan (3)	Warwickshire (3)	Essex (2)	Surrey (2)	
1998	Leicestershire (3)	Lancashire (4)	Lancashire (7)	Essex (2)	
1999	Surrey (16)	Lancashire (5)	Gloucestershire (2)	Gloucestershire (2)	
2000	Surrey (17)	Gloucestershire (1)	Gloucestershire (3)	Gloucestershire (3)	
2001	Yorkshire (30)	Kent (5)	Somerset (3)	Surrey (3)	
2002	Surrey (18)	Glamorgan (2)	Yorkshire (3)	Warwickshire (2)	
2003	Sussex (1)	Surrey (2)	Gloucestershire (4)		Surrey
2004	Warwickshire (6)	Glamorgan (3)	Gloucestershire (5)		Leicestershire (1)
2005	Nottinghamshire (5)	Essex (4)	Hampshire (2)		Somerset (1)
2006	Sussex (2)	Essex (5)	Sussex (5)		Leicestershire (2)
2007	Sussex (3)	Worcestershire (4)	Durham		Kent (1)
2008	Durham (1)	Sussex (2)	Essex (3)		Middlesex (1)
2009	Durham (2)	Sussex (3)	Hampshire (3)		Sussex (1)
2010	Nottinghamshire (6)	Warwickshire (4)			Hampshire (1)
2011	Lancashire (8)	Surrey (3)			Leicestershire (3)
2012	Warwickshire (7)	Hampshire (4)			Hampshire (2)
2013	Durham (3)	Nottinghamshire (2)			Northamptonshire (1)
2014	Yorkshire (31)	Durham (1)			Birmingham (1)
2015	Yorkshire (32)	Gloucestershire (2)			Lancashire (1)
2016	Middlesex (11)	Warwickshire (5)			Northamptonshire (2)
2017	Essex (7)	Nottinghamshire (3)			Nottinghamshire (1)
2018	Surrey (19)	Hampshire (5)			Worcestershire (1)
2019	Essex (8)	Somerset (2)			Essex (1)
2020	Not held (Note: The Bob Willis Trophy was won by Essex in 2020 and by Warwickshire in 2021.)	Not held			Nottinghamshire (2)
2021	Warwickshire (8)	Glamorgan (4)			Kent (2)
2022	Surrey (20)	Kent (6)			Hampshire (3)
2023	Surrey (21)	Leicestershire (3)			Somerset (2)
2024	Surrey (22)	Glamorgan (5)			Gloucestershire (1)
2025	Nottinghamshire (7)	Worcestershire (5)			Somerset (3)
2026	Warwickshire (9)	Middlesex (2)			Northamptonshire (3)

== Summary totals ==
Club	County Championship	Sunday League / Pro40 / ECB 40 Royal London One-Day Cup	Gillette Cup / NatWest Trophy / C&G Trophy / FP Trophy†	B&H Cup†	Twenty20 Cup / Friends Life t20 / t20 Blast	Bob Willis Trophy	Total
Yorkshire	32 (+1 Shared)	1	3	1	0	0	38
Surrey	22 (+1 Shared)	3	1	3	1	0	31
Lancashire	8 (+1 Shared)	5	7	4	1	0	26
Warwickshire	9	5	5	2	1	1	23
Middlesex	11 (+2 Shared)	2	4	2	1	0	22
Essex	8	5	3	2	1	1	20
Kent	6 (+1 Shared)	6	2	3	2	0	20
Hampshire	2	5	3	2	3	0	15
Nottinghamshire	7	3	1	1	2	0	14
Worcestershire	5	5	1	1	1	0	13
Leicestershire	3	3	0	3	3	0	12
Sussex	3	3	5	0	1	0	12
Gloucestershire	0	2	5	3	1	0	11
Somerset	0	2	3	2	3	0	10
Glamorgan	3	5	0	0	0	0	8
Northamptonshire	0	0	2	1	3	0	6
Durham	3	1	1	0	0	0	5
Derbyshire	1	1	1	1	0	0	4

† denotes defunct competition
