= Mel Ryan =

English cricketer (1933–2015)

Personal information
- Full name: Melville Ryan
- Born: 23 June 1933; Huddersfield, West Riding of Yorkshire
- Died: 16 November 2015 (aged 82); Dalton, Huddersfield, West Yorkshire
- Batting: Right-handed
- Bowling: Right-arm fast-medium
- Role: Bowler

Domestic team information
- Years: Team
- 1954–1965: Yorkshire

Career statistics
| Competition | First-class | List A |
|---|---|---|
| Matches | 150 | 3 |
| Runs scored | 682 | 7 |
| Batting average | 7.49 | 7.00 |
| 100s/50s | 0/0 | 0/0 |
| Top score | 26* | 6* |
| Balls bowled | 23,360 | 258 |
| Wickets | 413 | 5 |
| Bowling average | 22.92 | 29.80 |
| 5 wickets in innings | 12 | 0 |
| 10 wickets in match | 2 | 0 |
| Best bowling | 7/45 | 2/31 |
| Catches/stumpings | 59/0 | 3/0 |
- Source: ESPN cricinfo, 28 August 2022

Melville Ryan (23 June 1933 – 16 November 2015) was an English professional cricketer who played for Yorkshire County Cricket Club from 1954 to 1965. He was born in Huddersfield, and died in the Kirkland Hospice at Dalton in Huddersfield.

Ryan was a right-arm fast-medium bowler who took 413 wickets in 150 first-class matches at an average of 22.92 runs per wicket. He took five wickets in an innings twelve times with best figures of 7/45. He achieved ten wickets in a match twice with a best return of 10/77. A right-handed tail-end batsman, he scored 682 career runs with a highest score of 26*. He was generally an outfielder and completed 59 catches.

== Cricket career ==
Born in Huddersfield, Mel Ryan was keen on playing both football and cricket as a boy. In 1947, when he was 14, Yorkshire County Cricket Club invited him to their coaching classes at Headingley, but they saw him as a promising batsman rather than as a bowler. Through his teens, Ryan played for the former Bradley Mills club in the Huddersfield Cricket League and then for Eccleshill in the Bradford League.

Ryan joined Yorkshire as a player in 1954, aged 21, and went on to play for them in 150 first-class matches until 1965. He also played for the Yorkshire Second XI (1954–1962), the Minor Counties (1957–1958) and the International Cavaliers (1966). His first-class debut was for Yorkshire against Combined Services at St George's Road Cricket Ground, Harrogate, 21–23 July 1954. The match was a high-scoring draw with no play on the third day but Ryan took 3/84 and enjoyed early success when he had opener John Murray caught by Brian Close for 2. That was his only first team appearance in his debut season; he also played in six matches for the Second XI in the Minor Counties Championship.

Ryan played in five first team matches and six Second XI matches in 1955, taking sixteen first-class wickets. He made his County Championship debut on 6 August against Derbyshire at Park Avenue, Bradford, taking 4/44 and 0/16 as Yorkshire won by an innings and 94 runs. In 1956, he played in six matches for the first team and four for the Second XI, taking nineteen first-class wickets.

Ryan was a member of the Second XI team which won the Minor Counties Championship in 1957 and 1958, playing in ten and nine matches respectively, including the two Championship Challenge matches.

In 1958, playing against Warwickshire at Edgbaston, Ryan achieved his career-best bowling figures of 7/45 in Warwickshire's second innings. He took five of the last six wickets as Warwickshire collapsed from 188/4 to 229 all out. He made only occasional appearances for Yorkshire's first team until 1961 when he became a regular choice, usually opening the bowling with Fred Trueman. Ryan was awarded his county cap in 1962.

Yorkshire enjoyed considerable success during Ryan's career, winning four County Championship titles between 1959 and 1963. He was not a first team regular in 1959 when Ronnie Burnet led Yorkshire to their first title since 1949. Ryan played in five matches and took 21 wickets in 1959. He was more involved under Vic Wilson's captaincy in 1960 and 1962, taking 37 and 73 wickets respectively. Under Brian Close in 1963, Ryan took 57 wickets.

Ryan took five wickets in an innings twelve times, his best return being the 7/45 at Edgbaston in 1958. He twice achieved ten wickets in a match. Playing for Yorkshire against Northamptonshire at Acklam Park, Middlesbrough on 24–27 June 1961, he took 10/94 in the match with 4/47 and 6/47, Yorkshire winning by 89 runs. His best match return was 10/77 when he took 4/44 and 6/33 for Yorkshire against Leicestershire at Park Avenue, 15–17 August 1962. Yorkshire won by 116 runs. There was a postscript to the Park Avenue match involving Ryan and Yorkshire's chairman, former club captain Brian Sellers. Ryan, who was tall and strongly built, had a reputation on the county circuit for being "extremely well-hung". After his match winning performance against Leicestershire, Sellers came into the dressing room and said: "Well done, Mel. Is it thee cock that's done it?"

One of his Yorkshire team-mates, fellow fast bowler Bob Platt, described Ryan's bowling action as "a busy and effective run-up (followed by) delivery at a lively pace". Platt said Ryan did not bowl bouncers as he relied on accurate line and length. Ryan told Wisden that he loved sharing the bowling with Trueman but he (Ryan) would have been much more successful and taken many more wickets "if Fred hadn't been at the other end". Journalist Chris Waters wrote a biography of Trueman and, as part of his research, calculated that Trueman had opened Yorkshire's bowling in 802 innings with 28 "new ball partners". Ryan is second in this list with 126, behind Tony Nicholson with 188. Trueman thought highly of Ryan and specifically mentions his performance in a very close match against Lancashire at Old Trafford in 1960. Lancashire won by two wickets after scoring the winning run off the final ball of the final over before time expired (all four results had been possible when the over began). Trueman praised a "magnificent" performance by Ryan and his words were echoed after the match by Lancashire's Brian Statham. Yorkshire had scored 154 and 149. Lancashire had scored 226 in their first innings and so needed 78 to win. Trueman and Ryan bowled unchanged through the 31 overs available and, with only one ball left, Lancashire had reached 77/8 and the scores were level. Trueman bowled the last ball to Jack Dyson who managed to deflect it away to the boundary for the winning runs. Ryan had taken 5/50 and Trueman 2/28 to bring Yorkshire that close to winning.

Towards the end of his career, Ryan played in three Gillette Cup matches, taking five wickets at 29.80, and scoring seven runs for once out. He retired from first-class cricket in 1965. His final match for Yorkshire was against Northamptonshire at Headingley, 19–22 June 1965. Northamptonshire won by 58 runs. Ryan took 2/35 and 0/6; his final wicket was that of David Steele, whom he bowled for 12. Trueman was not playing in this match and Ryan shared the pace bowling with John Waring and Tony Nicholson, who became Ryan's successor in the Yorkshire team.

== Business career ==
Ryan's Wisden obituary mentions his lack of interest in schoolwork because, depending on how his sporting ambitions developed, he knew he would eventually run the family's newsagency business in the Huddersfield area. The business was established by his parents, John and Cora Ryan. When his cricket career ended, Ryan formed a partnership with his brother Granville and nephew John Ryan to run the chain of shops.

== Death ==
Mel Ryan became terminally ill in 2015 and his last days were spent at the Kirkwood Hospice in Dalton, Huddersfield. He died, aged 82, on 16 November 2015 and was survived by his wife June, his daughter and three grandchildren. His Yorkshire team-mate Ken Taylor, also from Huddersfield, paid tribute to him, saying that Ryan was a "straight-talking, kindly and generous man".

== Sources ==
- Playfair Cricket Annual, 8th to 16th editions, editor Gordon Ross, Playfair Books, 1955–1963
- Waters, Chris (2011). Fred Trueman: The Authorised Biography. London: Aurum Press. ISBN 978-1-8451-3453-2.
