= Bryan Stott =

English cricketer (born 1934)

Personal information
- Full name: William Bryan Stott
- Born: 18 July 1934 (age 92); Yeadon, West Riding of Yorkshire
- Batting: Left-handed
- Bowling: Right-arm off break

Domestic team information
- Years: Team
- 1952–1963: Yorkshire
- 1955–1956: Combined Services

Career statistics
Competition	First-class	List A
Matches	190	2
Runs scored	9,248	30
Batting average	31.45	15.00
100s/50s	17/46	0/0
Top score	186	30
Balls bowled	189	–
Wickets	7	–
Bowling average	16.00	–
5 wickets in innings	0	–
10 wickets in match	0	–
Best bowling	4/34	–
Catches/stumpings	91/–	0/0
- Source: ESPN cricinfo, 28 August 2013

William Bryan Stott (born 18 July 1934) is an English former professional cricketer who played for Yorkshire County Cricket Club from 1952 to 1963. He also played three first-class matches for the Combined Services from 1955 to 1956. He was born in Yeadon.

Originally a middle order batsman, Stott from 1957 was used principally as an opening bat and scored 9,248 runs in 190 first-class matches at an average of 31.45 runs per completed innings. He completed 17 career centuries with highest scores of 186 against Warwickshire at Edgbaston in 1960, and 181 against Essex at Bramall Lane in 1957. He was a right-arm off break bowler, though he was rarely called upon, and he took only seven career wickets at an average of 16.00 runs per wicket. His best bowling return was 4/34 against Surrey at Bramall Lane in 1962. He generally fielded at cover point and completed 91 career catches.

Stott's best season was 1959 when he scored 2,034 runs and helped Yorkshire, captained by Ronnie Burnet, to win the County Championship for the first time since 1949. In recognition of his achievements that season, he was selected as one of Playfair Cricket Annual's "XI Cricketers of 1959". Stott was also a member of Yorkshire's title-winning teams in 1960, 1962 and 1963.

== Early life ==
Stott was born in 1934 in Yeadon and educated nearby at Aireborough Grammar School.

== Cricket career ==
=== Early years ===
Stott joined Yorkshire County Cricket Club in 1951 when he was 16. He made his Minor Counties Championship debut for the Yorkshire Second XI in the same season, and his first-class debut in 1952.

Stott joined the Royal Air Force for his national service and played for the RAF cricket team in minor matches. He also played in three first-class matches for the Combined Services between 1955 and 1956.

=== First team regular ===
Stott was awarded his county cap in 1957.

Although he was never a Test-class batsman, Stott was certainly county-class and was widely respected for his determination and team spirit. Fred Trueman later recalled the final match of the 1959 season, which Yorkshire had to win if they were to claim the County Championship title. The match was against Sussex at the County Ground, Hove. Sussex had nothing to play for except pride but, as Trueman says, they "gave no quarter". Yorkshire began their second innings, they needed to score 215 runs to win in only 100 minutes. Inspired by their captain Ronnie Burnet, the team believed the match could be won and were determined to do it. Stott was opening the innings at this time and he gave immediate notice of Yorkshire's intent by driving the first ball of the innings back over bowler Ian Thomson's head for six. After two wickets had fallen, he was joined by Doug Padgett. Their third wicket partnership quickly gathered pace and, after only an hour, Yorkshire were 150/2, needing another 65 in the last forty minutes. Stott was eventually out for 96 and Padgett for 79 but they had won the match and Yorkshire achieved the target after only 95 minutes for the loss of five wickets. Trueman said Stott had run so many singles in a short time that he was "absolutely knackered" when he came back to the dressing room where he "spent five minutes with a cup of tea, sitting staring at the floor". The upshot of it all was that Yorkshire did win the title, thanks in part to results elsewhere, especially at The Oval where Surrey lost to Northamptonshire. Playfair Cricket Annual recognised Stott's part in his county's success and, along with Burnet and Ray Illingworth, he was named by the annual as one of its "Playfair 1959 XI".

=== Bowling ===
Stott was a very occasional right-arm off spinner. He took only seven career wickets but four of them were in one innings when he achieved his best return of 4/34 against Surrey at Bramall Lane in 1962. The fixture was Fred Trueman's benefit match and it was ruined by rain. Yorkshire were in a good position, however, and captain Vic Wilson made a sporting declaration in the hope of bowling Surrey out cheaply. This didn't happen, thanks to a big innings by John Edrich who scored 154. The match became a certain draw and Wilson decided to let all his specialist batsmen bowl (though not himself) until time ran out. Stott was surprisingly successful and took the wickets of Edrich, Bernie Constable, Stewart Storey and Tony Lock in only ten overs.

=== Final season ===
In 1963, his final season, Stott played in two Gillette Cup matches, scoring a total of 30 runs. His final first-class appearance was against Warwickshire at the North Marine Road Ground, Scarborough from 31 July to 2 August 1963. Yorkshire won by 92 runs but it was not a good match for Stott who was out for 0 and 3. Stott was plagued by injuries in 1963 and missed several matches, as did his team-mates Ray Illingworth, Doug Padgett and Ken Taylor. Towards the end of the season, Stott announced his retirement from cricket.

== Later life ==
After his cricket career ended, Stott lived in Yeadon and worked in the family businesses in Yeadon and Rawdon, Stotts Plumbers and Stotts Outfitters. He and his wife Sheila served as president and lady president of the Yeadon Amateur Operatic and Dramatic Society from 2010 until 2017.

== Sources ==
- Playfair Cricket Annual, 6th to 16th editions, editor Gordon Ross, Playfair Books, 1953–1963
- Wisden Cricketers' Almanack, 100th edition, editor Norman Preston, Sporting Handbooks Ltd, 1963
