= Fred Rumsey =

English cricketer

Personal information
- Full name: Frederick Edward Rumsey
- Born: 4 December 1935 (age 90); Stepney, London, England
- Batting: Right-handed
- Bowling: Left-hand fast
- Role: Bowler

International information
- National side: England (1964–1965)
- Test debut (cap 425): 23 July 1964 v Australia
- Last Test: 22 July 1965 v South Africa

Domestic team information
- Years: Team
- 1960–1962: Worcestershire
- 1963–1968: Somerset
- 1969–1973: Derbyshire

Career statistics
Competition	Test	FC	LA
Matches	5	180	95
Runs scored	30	1,015	114
Batting average	15.00	8.45	4.75
100s/50s	0/0	0/0	0/0
Top score	21*	45	16*
Balls bowled	1,145	28,878	4,802
Wickets	17	580	130
Bowling average	27.11	20.29	16.80
5 wickets in innings	0	30	0
10 wickets in match	0	5	0
Best bowling	4/25	8/26	4/8
Catches/stumpings	0/–	20/–	20/–
- Source: CricketArchive, 22 September 2016

Frederick Edward Rumsey (born 4 December 1935) is an English former cricketer who founded the Professional Cricketers Association (PCA) in 1967. He played five Test matches for England against Australia, South Africa & New Zealand in the mid-1960s. Rumsey played county cricket for Worcestershire, Somerset and Derbyshire.

== Life and career ==
Born 4 December 1935, Stepney, London, UK, Rumsey began his first-class career for Worcestershire against Cambridge University in 1960, his first wicket being that of future England captain Tony Lewis. He made a few more appearances over the next two years, but was largely confined to second-eleven cricket and for the 1963 season until he moved to Somerset.

For six seasons Rumsey was a fixture in the Somerset side, taking a total of 547 first-class wickets at an average of 20.14, and in three seasons (1963, 1965 and 1966) reaching the 100-wicket mark. His best achievements came in 1965, when he took 8–26 against Hampshire in a low-scoring game in which only 283 runs were scored for the loss of 33 wickets. He took 119 first-class wickets that season at an average of only 16.18, taking five or more in an innings on seven occasions.

As one of the fastest bowlers ever to play for Somerset Rumsey had made his Test debut in 1964 against Australia at Manchester, his 2–99 from 35.5 overs fairly impressive in a match in which Australia piled up 656 for 8 declared, thanks to 311 from Bob Simpson (indeed, both sides passed 600 in their first innings); he was, however, not retained for the fifth Test at the Oval. In 1965, Rumsey played in all three Tests against the New Zealanders, taking a career-best 4–25 in the second Test at Lord's and claiming nine at 25.44 in the series as a whole. He kept his place in the team for the first Test against South Africa in late July, but despite six wickets in the match this was to prove his last appearance for England.

During the winter of 1967/68, Somerset appointed Rumsey public relations and fund raising officer. It was the first appointment of its type in English first-class cricket. Fred Rumsey's greatest contribution to cricket came in 1967 when he founded the Professional Cricketers' Association. Before the creation of the PCA English Cricket players had little to no say in the administration of the game in England & Wales. Rumsey's creation of a players union was recognised when the PCA recently appointed him Honorary Life Founder Member and a vice-president.

In 1969, Rumsey moved counties again, from Somerset to Derbyshire where he played one day cricket and again operated as Fund Raiser and Public Relations officer.

He was to remain at Derbyshire until his retirement after the 1973 season, making just one first-class appearance in those five seasons (against his old county of Somerset at Bath in 1970) but making many appearances in the limited-overs game. In 1970, he achieved his best one-day figures of 4–8 against Worcestershire at Derby, and in all he took 100 List A wickets at 18.44 for Derbyshire. Rumsey was awarded a Derbyshire cap in 1972.

Rumsey's final game was against Nottinghamshire in the John Player League on 9 September 1973. After retirement he became involved with the Lord's Taverners, and appeared in charity matches and other events. His friendships included the anti-apartheid campaigner Donald Woods, John Arlott, Eric Morecambe, Colin Milburn and David Gower.

In 2008 Fred Rumsey was honoured by Somerset supporters when they selected him as a 'Legend' of the Cricket Club having taken over 570 first-class wickets in 6 seasons.

He published his autobiography Sense of Humour, Sense of Justice in April 2019.
