= John Waring =

English cricketer (1942–2023)

Personal information
- Full name: John Shaw Waring
- Born: 1 October 1942; Ripon, North Riding of Yorkshire, England
- Died: 1 October 2023 (aged 81); Harrogate, North Yorkshire, England
- Batting: Right-handed
- Bowling: Right arm fast medium
- Role: Bowler

Domestic team information
- Years: Team
- 1963–1966: Yorkshire
- 1967: Warwickshire
- 1970–1973: Cumberland

Career statistics
Competition	First-class	List A
Matches	29	1
Runs scored	152	1
Batting average	10.85	–
100s/50s	0/0	0/0
Top score	26	1*
Balls bowled	2,762	24
Wickets	55	0
Bowling average	22.74	–
5 wickets in innings	2	–
10 wickets in match	1	–
Best bowling	7/40	–
Catches/stumpings	17/–	0/–
- Source: ESPN cricinfo, 3 September 2022

John Shaw Waring (1 October 1942 – 1 October 2023) was an English professional cricketer who played for Yorkshire County Cricket Club from 1963 to 1966. He also played one match for Warwickshire in 1967. He was born in Ripon.

== Cricket career ==
Born in Ripon on 1 October 1942, John Waring was a right-arm fast-medium bowler who played in 28 first-class matches for Yorkshire County Cricket Club from 1963 to 1966, and one match for Warwickshire in 1967. He also played in one Gillette Cup match for Yorkshire in 1965. In other matches, he played for the Yorkshire Second XI from 1961 to 1966, the Minor Counties in 1966, Cumberland from 1970 to 1973, and for both the Nottinghamshire Second XI and the Surrey Second XI in 1967.

Waring took 55 first-class wickets at 22.74, with a best return of 7 for 40 against Lancashire in a 1966 Roses Match at Headingley; his match return of 10/63 was the only time he achieved ten wickets in a match. He scored 152 runs with a highest score of 26, at an average of 10.85. Generally an outfielder, he held 17 catches in the field. He did not take a wicket in one-day cricket.

Waring sometimes opened the Yorkshire bowling in combination with Fred Trueman. Journalist Chris Waters wrote a biography of Trueman and, as part of his research, calculated that Trueman had opened Yorkshire's bowling in 802 innings with 28 "new ball partners". Waring is fourteenth in this list with eight innings; the leaders are Tony Nicholson (188), Mel Ryan (126) and Bob Appleyard (101).

== Death ==
Waring died on 1 October 2023, at the age of 81.

== Sources ==
- Wisden Cricketers' Almanack, 101st edition, editor Norman Preston, Sporting Handbooks Ltd, 1964
- Playfair Cricket Annual, 17th to 21st editions, editor Gordon Ross, Playfair Books, 1964–1968
- Waters, Chris (2011). Fred Trueman: The Authorised Biography. London: Aurum Press. ISBN 978-1-8451-3453-2.
