= Brian Close =

English cricketer (1931–2015)

Brian Close CBE
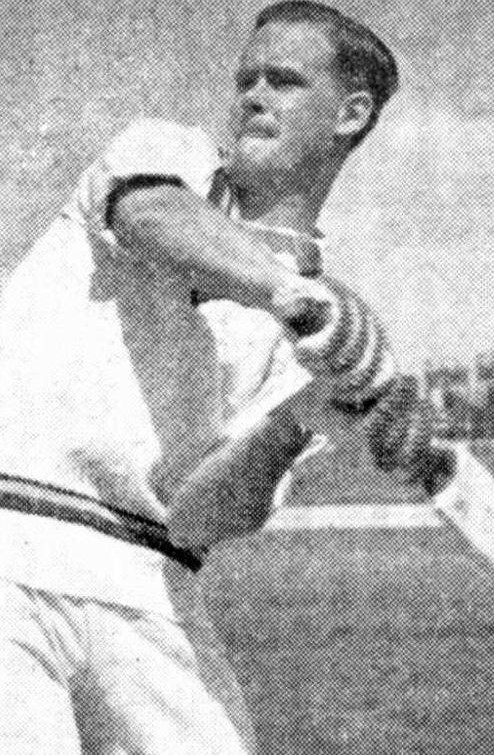
- Brian Close in 1950

Personal information
- Full name: Dennis Brian Close
- Born: 24 February 1931; Rawdon, Yorkshire, England
- Died: 13 September 2015 (aged 84); Baildon, Yorkshire, England
- Batting: Left-handed
- Bowling: Right-arm off break Right-arm medium
- Role: All-rounder

International information
- National side: England (1949–1976)

Domestic team information
- Years: Team
- 1949–1970: Yorkshire
- 1950–1967: Marylebone Cricket Club
- 1971–1977: Somerset

Career statistics
Competition	Test	ODI	FC	LA
Matches	22	3	786	164
Runs scored	887	49	34,994	3,458
Batting average	25.34	16.33	33.26	23.84
100s/50s	0/4	0/0	52/171	2/11
Top score	70	43	198	131
Balls bowled	1,212	18	69,971	2,258
Wickets	18	0	1,171	65
Bowling average	29.55	–	26.42	22.43
5 wickets in innings	0	–	43	0
10 wickets in match	0	–	3	0
Best bowling	4/35	–	8/41	4/9
Catches/stumpings	24/0	1/0	813/1	53
- Source: ESPNcricinfo, 24 February 2020
Association football career
- Position: Forward
Youth career
- 1945–1949: Leeds United
Senior career*
Years	Team	Apps	(Gls)
1949–1950	Leeds United	0	(0)
1950–1952	Arsenal	0	(0)
1952–1953	Bradford City	6	(2)
International career
- England Youth
- * Club domestic league appearances and goals

Dennis Brian Close, CBE (24 February 1931 – 13 September 2015) was an English first-class cricketer. He was picked to play against New Zealand in July 1949, when he was 18 years old. Close went on to play 22 Test matches for England, captaining them seven times to six wins and one drawn test. Close also captained Yorkshire to four county championship titles – the main domestic trophy in English cricket. He later went on to captain Somerset, where he is widely credited with developing the county into a hard-playing team, and helping to mould Viv Richards and Ian Botham into the successful players they became.

Throughout his cricket career, which lasted from 1948 until the 1977 season, Close was one of the most charismatic and well-known cricketers. He scored almost 35,000 runs as a batsman, including 52 centuries with a highest innings score of 198. He also took 1,168 wickets as a bowler, over 800 catches as a fielder and one stumping, as a stand-in wicket-keeper. At just over six feet (1.83 m) tall he was a noticeable presence on the field, often fielding at the short leg position, close to the batsman. As cricketers did not use head or body protection in Close's day, he would often get hurt when a batsman struck a ball that hit him. Close was also noted, as a batsman, for standing up to intimidatory bowling, letting the ball hit his unprotected torso rather than flinching.

Close was known as a cricketing gambler; he was prepared to take risks and to court controversy throughout his career. He was serving a "confined to barracks" punishment during his military service when selected for his first international cricket tour to Australia in 1950, was sacked as England captain for timewasting, and later sacked by Yorkshire for his lukewarm attitude to one-day cricket. He was also accused of not giving enough support to younger Yorkshire cricketers. He attracted further criticism by touring apartheid-era South Africa and white-minority-controlled Rhodesia with private teams. As chairman of Yorkshire's cricket subcommittee he had many run-ins with the former Yorkshire captain, Geoffrey Boycott. However, he continued to serve Yorkshire cricket, and in his seventies was coaching and occasionally captaining the county's Colts XI. He was President of Yorkshire in 2008/9.

== Early years ==
Close was born into a working class family in Rawdon, West Riding of Yorkshire, around 7 miles (11 km) west of Leeds, on 24 February 1931. His parents were Harry, a weaver, and Esther (née Barrett). He was the second eldest of five boys and a girl. The family lived in a series of small council houses in Rawdon, Guiseley and Yeadon. Growing up, Close practised cricket with his father in the houses' back gardens; Harry Close was himself a keen cricketer, who kept wicket and was a big hitter in the Bradford Cricket League, although he never attained the standard of the Yorkshire county team. Rawdon had cricketing pedigree: Hedley Verity—an England international in the period before the Second World War, in which he was killed —grew up there, and the Verity family continued to live in the village. At Rawdon Littlemoor Primary School, Close was taught by Grace Verity, Hedley's sister, and he was friends with two of his children, Wilfred and Douglas.

At Aireborough Grammar School, Close excelled both academically and athletically. The school went unbeaten in the six cricketing summers while Close was there, and the school's sport's master arranged for him to receive coaching from George Hirst, a former England international who coached Yorkshire. Close dominated junior level cricket in the area; he joined Rawdon Cricket Club in 1942, when he was eleven years of age, and was almost immediately selected to play for both the under-18 side and the second team. Close was also proficient at football, and at the age of fourteen, he was signed as an amateur by Leeds United. A natural inside forward, he became the first Leeds player to feature as a youth international, when in October 1948, he played with England against Scotland at Pittodrie Park in Aberdeen.

After passing his Higher School Certificate, Close seriously considered becoming a doctor; his headmaster at Aireborough believed that he could have been accepted into Cambridge or Oxford university, but he was not allowed to start university until he had completed two years of national service with the military. With the enforced break from his studies he chose to try a career as a professional sportsman; he signed a professional contract with Leeds United and having already played for the Yorkshire Colts in second eleven cricket, he joined them for winter coaching. The coaches encouraged Close to switch from bowling seam to being an off spinner.

== Yorkshire and England ==
=== Debut season ===
In February 1949, Close underwent a medical examination with the British Army, but due to an injury he had suffered playing football, his call-up was delayed by a few months, allowing him to continue into pre-season training with Yorkshire. His performance in pre-season was such that he was given a trial for the county in the two first-class matches against Cambridge and Oxford Universities. He made his debut on 11 May 1949, alongside Fred Trueman and Frank Lowson – all three went on to play for England. Close impressed the Yorkshire hierarchy enough for his trial to be extended into the County Championship season; Bill Bowes, one of Yorkshire's coaches, declared that he was the "natural successor to the veteran all-rounder Frank Smailes". Close continued to perform well, particularly his bowling; in his fifth first-class game, against Essex, Close took five for 58 in Essex's first innings, then top-scored with an undefeated 88 runs in the Yorkshire innings. His performances for Yorkshire earned him a place in the North v South match, which was also being used as a trial for selection for the upcoming Test matches against New Zealand. Close scored two runs, and did not take a wicket; The Times described his batting as a "disappointing feature" of the match, but noted that despite not taking any wickets, "he bowled his off-breaks round the wicket well enough."

Close continued to do well for Yorkshire and was selected to play for the Players against the Gentlemen, at Lord's in July. Unofficially, this prestigious match also served as a Test match trial, and Close scored 65 runs, the most amongst the Players, in what was described as a "most commendable performance" by The Times. During the match, Close got caught out by cricket's antiquated social etiquette. When he reached his half-century he was congratulated by the Gentlemen's wicket-keeper, Billy Griffith, who said: "Well played, Brian", to which Close responded: "Thank you, Billy". Ten days later, he was called to see Brian Sellers, a member of the Yorkshire committee, who reprimanded Close for his effrontery in not addressing an amateur player as "Mister". Despite this rebuke, the Yorkshire committee secured the assistance of the Member of Parliament for Bradford Central, Maurice Webb, who successfully requested that Close be allowed to complete the 1949 season for Yorkshire, before commencing his National Service.

Close was then selected to play for England in the third Test match at Old Trafford against the touring New Zealanders; a decision praised by The Times, who described him as "a young all-round cricketer of such promise as to demand immediate encouragement." In the match, Close became England's youngest Test player, aged 18 years and 149 days, a record he still held at his death, and which was surpassed only in 2022. He came in to bat when England needed quick runs, his instruction from Freddie Brown, the captain, being to "have a look at a couple and then give it a go". Close duly played two balls back to the bowler, then hit out for the boundary, only to be caught in the outfield for a score of nought. He had previously taken one wicket for 39 runs during the first New Zealand innings. In his autobiography, I Don't Bruise Easily, his early Test call-up is described "an albatross round [his] neck", but Close later attributed this phrase to the book's shadow writer, Don Mosey. During the late-season Scarborough Festival, he became the youngest player to achieve the double, of 1,000 runs and 100 wickets in a single first-class season.

=== Tour to Australia in 1950 ===
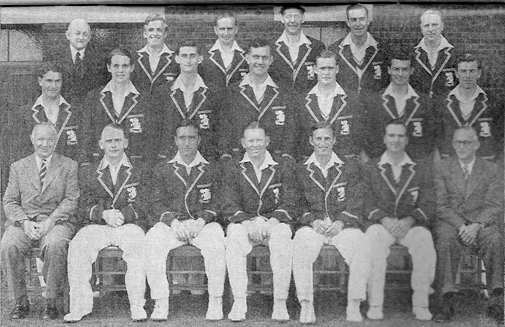
Brian Close (pictured middle row, third from the right) with the England team which toured Australia in 1950–51

Close began his National Service on 6 October 1949, in the Royal Corps of Signals at Catterick Army Training Depot. Another football injury, picked up during training, meant that he spent his first month of military service excused from duties. Once he was fit again, he was given weekend passes from the army to play football for Leeds. During one of these games he was badly injured again: playing against Newcastle United he hurt his thigh in a collision with Ted Robledo. Showing the stubbornness that he later became famous for, Close played the rest of the game, but by the time he reported back for duty the next day, it was badly swollen and painful. He was excused from duties again, but not offered any treatment by the army. After around six weeks, he travelled home on leave and got some heat treatment from the Leeds United physiotherapist, but there was little progress until just before Christmas, when another examination by the army revealed ossification of the thigh. Two months of treatment and bed rest followed, which Close thinks saved his career, he said that otherwise: "the injury would have finished me. I would never had bent my leg again."

Close returned to fitness in time for the 1950 English cricket season, though little of it was first-class: he appeared for Yorkshire once, and made three first-class appearances for the Combined Services cricket team. He was playing plenty of other cricket; he played in inter-services matches during the week, and obtained weekend passes to play league cricket for Leeds on Saturdays and charity matches on Sundays. Between playing football and cricket, he had little time for anything else, so much so according to Close, he was never given a job in the army, as he would have no time in which to do it. His performances attracted the attention of the England cricket captain, Brown, who wanted Close to be included in the English party to tour Australia for the 1950–51 Ashes series. Brown consulted Close's county coach, former England bowler Bill Bowes, who pleaded with Brown not to select Close, arguing that such early promotion would damage him as a player. Brown ignored Bowes and selected Close.

Close's call-up to the Australian touring party attracted considerable press interest, and a press conference was called at Catterick to give the press a chance to question him. However, his moment of glory also gave rise to controversy, when one pressman found out that Close was "confined to barracks" for disciplinary reasons at the time his call-up was announced: he had absented himself from an army cricket match. The pressman promised to stay silent, but a week later a clerk on the camp newspaper telephoned the Daily Express with the news. However, Close still toured; his National Service was suspended so that he could do so, as touring sportsmen were considered to be ambassadors for the United Kingdom.

Close was the youngest player on the tour, and had little in common with the rest of the party; by the end, he was not even on talking terms with most of them. After a reasonable start, making a century on his First Class debut in Australia, Close faltered, and then became injured, with a badly pulled groin muscle. He was selected to play in the second Test, which England lost by 28 runs. After Australia were dismissed for 194, England had collapsed to 54 for 4 when Close came in to bat, with only eight deliveries to go before the lunch interval on the second day. Misjudging the bounce on the Melbourne wicket, which was somewhat different from the bounce of English wickets, he swept a ball from Jack Iverson only to get a top edge to Sam Loxton, fielding behind square leg. E. W. Swanton called it the worst shot he had seen played by a first-class batsman. The dressing room was silent when he returned. Brown, when advised that Close was a bit down and needed consolation, replied "Let the blighter stew. He deserves it."

Later in Tasmania, Close was ordered to play despite doctor's advice to rest, and as he tried to nurse his injury he acquired a reputation for malingering and insubordination. He was made to play in six of the next seven games. When England won a Test match in Australia for the first time in 13 years in the final Test, Close was not present. Nowadays, someone in Close's position would be carefully man-managed, and looked after by captain and team manager. But times were different then, and the Yorkshire stalwarts were proved right: he had been picked too early, and would never be a regular Test player.

=== Consolidation, 1951 to 1958 ===
The years between 1951 and 1958 were a period of career consolidation for Close, who achieved 1,000 runs in a season five times. Immediately after the tour to Australia Close had a good season in 1951, playing for the Combined Services, including a century against the touring South Africans. At the end of his National Service in October 1951, he signed for Arsenal, and tried briefly to combine playing football with his cricket for Yorkshire. This proved impossible; although Close received permission from Yorkshire captain Norman Yardley to leave the first match of the 1952 cricket season early, to play football for Arsenal, this leave was rescinded by the match manager. Close arrived late at Arsenal and was sacked.

Close enjoyed a good 1952 season at Yorkshire, achieving another double, but played no Test cricket. He played football, for Bradford City this time, and in doing so picked up a serious knee injury which ended his professional footballing career. It also threatened to end his cricket career—Close played only two first-class matches in the 1953 cricket season.

In 1954 Close scored his first first-class century for Yorkshire, an undefeated 123 against the touring Pakistanis. In 1955 he scored his first county championship century. In that year he played one Test match against South Africa, and at the end of the season was only 3 wickets short of another 1,000 runs/100 wickets double. He was in the selectors' sights again, and was picked for the tour to Pakistan in 1955/56. This was not a full England tour, and no Test matches were played. Close returned to the full England side in 1957, playing in the first two Tests against the West Indies, but did not perform well enough to secure a regular Test place.

Meanwhile, in this period, Yorkshire had not won a single County Championship. At the beginning of 1958 a new captain, Ronnie Burnet, was appointed. Burnet was 40 years old, without first-class cricket experience, and seemed an unlikely choice to restore Yorkshire's fortunes. It was believed by the Yorkshire committee that Burnet would inject some discipline into the Yorkshire team, but initially the appointment caused problems. Several senior players left the club; Johnny Wardle, Yorkshire's top bowler and Close's preferred choice of captain, was sacked for disciplinary reasons.

=== Yorkshire as county champions ===
Burnet, aided by Close, was successful in 1959, when Yorkshire at last won the county championship. At the end of that season, as Close later heard, Burnet was told that, having just won the championship, he could have another season as captain, but, if he did, Close would then take over. If Burnet resigned immediately, Vic Wilson could take over as captain in preference to Close. Burnet chose to step down straight-away. Once Wilson took over, with Close as the senior professional Yorkshire enjoyed a period of almost unbroken success, winning the county championship again in 1960, taking second place in 1961, and winning again in 1962.

=== More controversy ===
During this period Close was called up for his seventh Test in 1961, against Australia. This match, which at one point England appeared certain to win, turned to disaster, with Close bearing the main blame for England's defeat.

England were chasing a total of 256 runs to win the match, with just under four hours left to play. Scoring rapidly, they reached 150 for 1 wicket. Then Ted Dexter and Peter May got out in quick succession to Benaud, who was pitching his leg breaks into the rough outside the right-handers' leg stump. This brought Close to the crease. May, the captain, was instructing his players to go for the runs and secure the victory. Close accordingly took a calculated risk, and chose to hit out. He took one six off Benaud, but to the tenth ball he faced he played another unorthodox shot which Norman O'Neill caught above his head with two hands. Purists were outraged, and as England collapsed to 201 all out and a 54 run defeat, Close took most of the blame, with some commentators saying that he should never play for England again.

== Captaincy ==
=== Yorkshire captaincy ===
At the end of 1962, Wilson retired, and the Yorkshire committee appointed Close captain. According to Bowes: "almost overnight it seemed that Brian Close matured". He wrote, "Close's field placings were as intelligent and antagonistic as any seen in the county for 25 years".

Close's attitude, in his own words, was that "I've always believed that the team is more important than the individual", and that credo stood Yorkshire in good stead. Ray Illingworth noted that when he left Yorkshire to play for Leicestershire, the players there were surprised that, while Yorkshire were perennial Championship winners, the batting averages of their leading batsmen tended to languish in the 20s. The answer was that Close had honed them to play the innings required at the right time: when quick runs were required, players did not play for their averages, they played for quick runs.

Close was recalled to the England Test squad in 1963, and played his first full series of five matches, against the West Indies. His innings in the second Test at Lord's remains his best known. When England were pressing for a last-day victory, Close took the battle to the fastest West Indian fast bowlers, Wes Hall and Charlie Griffith, daring to advance down the wicket to them. This was before body protection and helmets were in use, and time and again the ball struck Close firmly on his body. But he persevered. With no other England player but Ken Barrington scoring above 20, Close's innings of 70 saved the game for England, and came near to winning it. Set 234 to win, England ended on 228 for 9, with Colin Cowdrey famously coming in to bat (for two balls at the non-striker's end) with his broken arm in plaster.

Close had been dismissed going for runs to win the game, and his courage earned him many plaudits. His shirtless torso, black and blue with bruises where he had been hit, made the front pages of the newspapers the next day. Len Hutton wrote him a congratulatory letter on his innings, and he returned to county cricket the hero. Overall, he made over 300 runs in the series, but was not selected for the next series.

Close also had immediate success as Yorkshire captain, winning the County Championship in 1963. His successes saw him named as one of the five Wisden Cricketers of the Year in 1964, acknowledging his impact on the 1963 season. Close went on to captain Yorkshire to the county championship in 1966, 1967 and 1968.

He first met his wife Vivien, an air stewardess with BOAC, in Bermuda whilst touring there with Yorkshire in 1964, when she was engaged to someone else. He pursued her relentlessly, even though initially she considered him not to be her type. Brian gambled with his love life too: on New Year's Day 1965 he told her that if she didn't agree to marry him, he would never see her again. They married the following March. They went on to have one daughter, Lynn, and a son, Lance.

=== England captaincy ===
After the fourth Test of their five-Test series against the West Indies in 1966, England were 3–0 down and had lost the series. Needing someone to come in to revitalise the squad, the England selectors turned to the successful Yorkshire captain, Brian Close. Close knew why he had been selected, and also why many of his men had been. At the pre-match dinner he said, "I shouldn't be here if we hadn't made such a mess of the series. What's more, neither would a few of you. You are here because you are all fighters, and we are going to keep the pressure on and keep it on for five days." What Close did was to engender a battling spirit for the final Test Match. So, when England were 166 for 7 in reply to the West Indies' 268 all out, they did not give up. Instead, centuries from Tom Graveney and John Murray, and half-centuries from Ken Higgs and John Snow, saw England to a score of 527. The highlight of the match was when West Indian captain Gary Sobers, who had a batting average in the series of well over 100, came in to bat at 137 for 5 with his side still 122 runs from making England bat again. Close knew that Sobers was a fine hooker, and he knew how he wanted to approach him, so he asked Snow to bowl a bouncer first up. Everything went to plan: Sobers hooked, edged the ball into his body, and it rebounded to Close at his customary short leg position, close to the batsman, ready to take the catch – or a full blow to the body had Sobers middled it. Sobers c. Close, b. Snow 0 off one ball. England went on to win the game by an innings and 34 runs.

There was no overseas tour in 1966/67, so the next game Close captained was the first Test at Headingley against India in 1967. Of the 16 Tests India had previously played in England, England had won 12 and drawn 4, and there were no expectations that there would be anything other than an England victory in the three-match series. But they still needed to be beaten, and England, under Close, won each game convincingly.

Pakistan toured England in the second half of the summer of 1967. The first match of that three-Test series was a rain-affected draw. The second Test was won comfortably by England by 10 wickets. It seemed certain that Close would be selected to captain England in their 1967/68 tour to the West Indies.

Then on 16, 17 and 18 August, Yorkshire, captained by Close, played Warwickshire at Edgbaston, Birmingham. Warwickshire had been set 142 to win in 100 minutes. When the match ended, Warwickshire were 133 for 5, nine runs short of victory, and the match was drawn. However, Yorkshire managed to bowl only 24 overs, with only two being bowled in the last 15 minutes. Whilst it was wet, and Yorkshire had to dry the ball often, this was seen as unacceptable time-wasting and gamesmanship. Close did not help himself as he personally berated a Warwickshire spectator who he thought had called out something inopportune, though in the event he picked on the wrong man. After the game, Close said to the Warwickshire captain, M.J.K. Smith, "Bad luck, Mike, you played better than we did. But I couldn't give you the game." Smith appeared to accept this when he replied, "I quite understand."

Brian Sellers, chairman of Yorkshire and the one who had berated Close in 1949 for saying "Thank you, Billy", then made matters worse for Close by sending an apology to the Marylebone Cricket Club (MCC). In 1967 England touring sides were still MCC sides rather than "England" sides, and the MCC took the opportunity to overrule the selectors who picked Close as captain. Close, whose "temperament had been shown lacking", did not go to the West Indies. On the Wednesday before the third and final Test against Pakistan, he was told he had been stripped of the captaincy; the replacement captain was Colin Cowdrey.

The third Test against Pakistan was Close's final Test as captain. He led England to a comprehensive 8-wicket victory, winning the series 2–0. His record as captain was played 7, won 6, drawn 1, the best record of any Englishman who captained in more than two Tests.

=== Last years at Yorkshire ===
In 1969 Close played only 18 county championship games as he was plagued by a calf injury, although he did lead Yorkshire to victory in the one-day Gillette Cup for a second time, the first time being in 1965. A shoulder injury saw Close miss much of the 1970 season, and Yorkshire fell down the championship table, but once Close was fit again, they had an extraordinary run and finished fourth.

Close, however, always opposed one-day cricket, believing that it lessens players' abilities. Mike Procter notes that when Gloucestershire played Yorkshire in the John Player 40-over League in 1970, with Yorkshire three wickets down and needing six an over, word came from Close in the dressing room: "No chance of winning this one, lads — just get some batting practice."

Yorkshire had a policy of not offering contracts to its players, but in return they would tell cricketers by the end of July if they did not require their services the next summer. When July 1970 came and went, Close must have thought he was safe. However, Close offended the Lancashire president, the Honourable Lionel Lister, when Lister entered the away captain's changing room to speak to Close after Lancashire, Yorkshire's archrivals, had beaten them at Old Trafford to retain the one-day John Player League trophy. Close, who may not have known who Lister was, offered Lister some choice words. Lister immediately told Brian Sellers, the chairman of the Yorkshire cricket committee, of the insult.

Close wrote a letter to Lister apologising, and gave a copy to a Yorkshire committeeman. But the letter was never presented to the committee as a whole, which voted to sack him as the first agenda item at their next meeting. In November 1970 Close was summoned to see Sellers, and given the choice of either resigning or being sacked. To begin with, he chose to resign. Later that day, and after speaking to his legal adviser, he retracted this, leaving Yorkshire to sack him. The reason, according to Yorkshire, was Close's dislike for the new 40-over one-day cricket league that was first played in 1969 (Close thought it led to bad habits and negative play), and because Close had supposedly not brought on the younger players.

== Later life and career ==
=== Somerset ===
After being sacked by Yorkshire, the 39-year-old Close received offers from many other counties, including Lancashire, Glamorgan, Middlesex and Leicestershire. But he turned all these down, preferring to accept a non-captain's role at Somerset.

The rest from the captaincy did Close good; he went through the 1971 season without injury, and scored 1,389 runs, including a century in his first game for Somerset, and a century in the game against Yorkshire. In 1972, he was awarded the CBE by the Queen for his services to cricket. Close was also promoted to Somerset captain. He soon gained the same respect and commitment from his players as he had at Yorkshire. He was also called up to the England one-day squad to captain them in a three-match One Day International series against Australia, which England won 2–1, when the regular England captain and his former Yorkshire teammate, Ray Illingworth, injured his ankle in the last Test.

In 1972/73 Close led a two-match tour of the "International Wanderers" to Rhodesia. The next two winters he captained the Derrick Robins' XI tours to apartheid South Africa. Robins' tours were the closest thing the South Africa team had to Test cricket at that time, and for his efforts in the first of the tours to South Africa, Close was named as one of the four South African Cricket Annual Cricketers of the Year in 1974.

During his time at Somerset Viv Richards and Ian Botham joined the county squad, and Close's leadership and discipline helped them become great cricketers. Botham said of Close, "There was a genuine enthusiasm for cricket which rubbed off on all those playing alongside him. You couldn't help but get excited by the game."

=== Final Test innings ===
In 1976, the 45-year-old Brian Close was called up for the first three Tests in England's five-Test series against the West Indies, who were no less ferocious than when Close was battered by them in 1963. In the second innings of the third Test at Old Trafford, Close's final Test innings, Close opened with the 39-year-old John Edrich. Michael Holding, Andy Roberts and Wayne Daniel, a trio of fast bowlers, pounded them for two and a half hours. It was one of the most brutal displays of fast bowling ever seen. Wisden said, "Close and Edrich defended their wickets and themselves against fast bowling, which was frequently too wild and hostile to be acceptable". Close himself said, "It must have been the worst wicket I experienced in Test cricket. The faster the West Indians bowled the worse it got because the balls broke through the surface of the wicket. They exploded and flew at you." With this innings of 20 runs off 108 balls in 162 minutes Close completed his Test career, under a vicious barrage, standing tall and taking the damage as he had against the West Indies at Lord's 13 years earlier.

After that, both Close and Edrich were dropped for the fourth Test. The interval between Close's first and last Test matches was 27 years, the second-longest after Wilfred Rhodes. He also became the fifteenth oldest man to have played in a Test match, since then only one man, Zimbabwean John Traicos, has played a Test match at a greater age.

=== End of first-class career ===
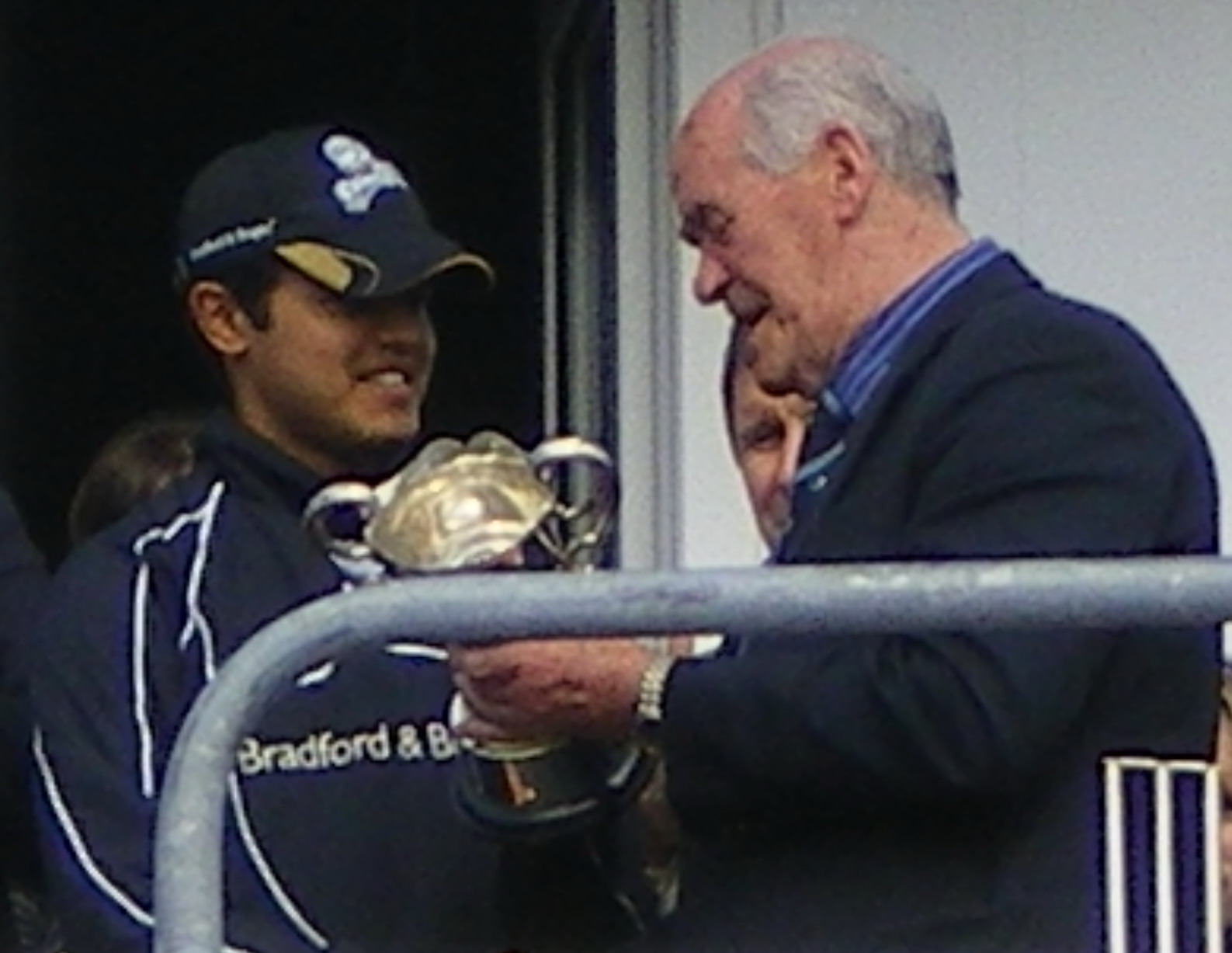
Brian Close presenting an award for Yorkshire in 2008.

By the time he retired from county cricket at the end of the 1977 season, Close had achieved folk hero status in Somerset. He went on to play for Todmorden in the Lancashire League. Close also had a stint as an England selector between 1979 and 1981 and in 1984 he was elected to the Yorkshire committee. He became chairman of the cricket sub-committee, which led him into more controversy and conflict with the former captain, Geoffrey Boycott. He was President of Yorkshire in 2008/9.

After his retirement from Somerset, Close continued to play at the Scarborough Festival against the touring international teams, first for T.N. Pearce's XI in 1978 and then for his own XI from 1982 to 1986. In 1986, aged 55, and playing his last-ever first-class innings, Close needed 10 runs to achieve a career-total 35,000 runs. With his score on 4 he glanced a ball down leg-side to the wicket-keeper and walked. Afterwards, the New Zealanders said that if they'd known how near he was to the landmark, they would have let him stay, but Close would have none of it – he was out, and that was that. When asked why he gave himself out he said: "It's an honourable game and that's the way I was brought up." Close's 786 first-class matches leave him 10th on the all-time list. Only four outfielders have taken more catches.

Close continued to turn out to help train Yorkshire youngsters, appearing for Yorkshire Colts XI in his seventies, sometimes captaining games and taking the short leg position without a helmet, a position he had taken so many times in the past. According to Imran Khan, Close once stood his ground when fielding at short leg when a batsman played a pull shot, the ball hit him on the forehead, rebounded and was caught at cover. Khan commented: "We are not all bullet-headed Yorkshiremen, however, and I don't recommend copying Close."

In later years Close played an unnamed member of the crowd in a cricket match alongside Ray Illingworth, in an episode of the TV drama Heartbeat called "Stumped". Dickie Bird played the umpire in that episode and Martin Bicknell also appeared.

Close died of lung cancer on 13 September 2015, aged 84.

== Notes and references ==
=== References ===
- Chalke, Stephen (2024). One Hell of a Life: Brian Close – Daring, Defiant and Daft. London: Fairfield Books. ISBN 978-1-739929-36-7.
- Close, Brian; Mosey, Don (1979) [1978]. I Don't Bruise Easily. London: Futura Publications. ISBN 0-7088-1529-4.
- Hill, Alan (2003) [2002]. Brian Close: Cricket's Lionheart. London: Methuen Publishing. ISBN 0-413-77297-7.
- Mosey, Don (1990). The Wisden Book of Captains on Tour: Test Cricket 1946–1989. London: Stanley Paul. ISBN 0-09-174366-4.
- Waters, Chris (2014). 10 for 10: Hedley Verity and the Story of Cricket's Greatest Bowling Feat. London: Bloomsbury. ISBN 978-1-4729-0890-2.

Sporting positions
Preceded by Colin Cowdrey	English national cricket captain 1966–1967	Succeeded by Colin Cowdrey
Preceded by Ray Illingworth	England ODI Captain; 1972	Succeeded by Ray Illingworth
Preceded by Brian Langford	Somerset County Cricket Captain; 1972–1977	Succeeded by Brian Rose
