= Bob Platt =

English cricketer (born 1932)

Personal information
- Full name: Robert Kenworthy Platt
- Born: 26 December 1932; Holmfirth, West Riding of Yorkshire
- Batting: Right-handed
- Bowling: Right arm fast medium
- Role: bowler

Domestic team information
- Years: Team
- 1955–1963: Yorkshire
- 1956: Combined Services
- 1964: Northamptonshire

Career statistics
Competition	First-class
Matches	101
Runs scored	424
Batting average	7.31
100s/50s	0/1
Top score	57*
Balls bowled	17,741
Wickets	301
Bowling average	22.58
5 wickets in innings	10
10 wickets in match	3
Best bowling	7/40
Catches/stumpings	38/0
- Source: ESPN cricinfo, 3 September 2022

Robert Kenworthy Platt (born 26 December 1932) is an English former professional cricketer who played for Yorkshire County Cricket Club from 1955 to 1963. He also played two first-class matches for the Combined Services in 1956 and three for Northamptonshire in 1964. He was born in Holmfirth.

Platt was a right-arm fast-medium bowler who took 301 wickets in 101 first-class matches at an average of 22.58 runs per wicket. He took five wickets in an innings ten times with best figures of 7/40. He achieved ten wickets in a match three times with a best return of WW/RRR. A right-handed tail-end batsman, he scored 424 career runs with a highest score of 57*. He was generally an outfielder and completed 38 catches.

== Career ==
Platt played in 96 matches for Yorkshire from 1955 to 1963. He was awarded his county cap in 1959.

Platt, a right arm fast medium bowler, took 301 wickets at an average of 22.58, with a best return of 7 for 40 against Gloucestershire in 1956. Also in 1956, he took 7 for 70 against Sussex while four years later claimed 6 for 33 against Middlesex at Lord's. A right-handed tail end batsman, he scored 424 runs at 7.31 with a highest score of 57*. That was his sole half-century, scored against Derbyshire at Queen's Park, Chesterfield in 1959.

In other matches, he played for the Yorkshire Second XI between 1955 and 1971; the RAF in 1956; Northamptonshire Second XI in 1964 and 1965; and, in 1966, for both the International Cavaliers and a Roses XI.

Platt often opened the Yorkshire bowling in combination with Fred Trueman. Journalist Chris Waters wrote a biography of Trueman and, as part of his research, calculated that Trueman had opened Yorkshire's bowling in 802 innings with 28 "new ball partners". Platt is fourth in this list with 98, behind Tony Nicholson (188), Mel Ryan (126) and Bob Appleyard (101). Waters recounted how Trueman overheard Platt boasting about being his opening partner and interrupted him by saying: "Aye, one of f**king twenty-eight, Platty!"

== Sources ==
- Playfair Cricket Annual, 8th to 16th editions, editor Gordon Ross, Playfair Books, 1955–1963
- Waters, Chris (2011). Fred Trueman: The Authorised Biography. London: Aurum Press. ISBN 978-1-8451-3453-2.
