= Frank Lowson =

English cricketer

Personal information
- Full name: Frank Anderson Lowson
- Born: 1 July 1925; Bradford, Yorkshire, England
- Died: 8 September 1984 (aged 59); Pool-in-Wharfedale, Yorkshire, England
- Batting: Right-handed
- Bowling: Right-arm offbreak

International information
- National side: England
- Test debut: 26 July 1951 v South Africa
- Last Test: 21 July 1955 v South Africa

Career statistics
Competition	Test	First-class
Matches	7	277
Runs scored	245	15,321
Batting average	18.84	37.18
100s/50s	0/2	31/72
Top score	68	259*
Catches/stumpings	5/–	190/–
- Source: CricInfo, 7 November 2022

Frank Anderson Lowson (1 July 1925 – 8 September 1984) was an English cricketer, who played in seven Tests for England from 1951 to 1955. In first-class cricket, Lowson amassed 15,321 runs at an average of over 37, but had drifted away from the county game by his early thirties.

== Life and career ==
Lowson was born in Bradford, Yorkshire, England. A right-handed opening batsman from the Bradford League, Lowson came late to first-class cricket and then was an instant success as an opening batsman for Yorkshire, scoring 1,799 runs in his first season, 1949, and partnering Len Hutton in the most prolific season of Hutton's career. The following year, 1950, Lowson was even better, scoring 2,152 runs and during the first half of the 1950s he continued a hugely productive partnership with Hutton, often being described as a Hutton clone.

The partnership moved into Test cricket against the South Africans in 1951. Lowson's first Test innings was 58 out of a first-wicket partnership of 99 with Hutton at Headingley, and he retained his place for the final match of the series at The Oval.

Lowson was then chosen for a gruellingly-long five-month Marylebone Cricket Club (MCC) tour of India, Pakistan and Ceylon (now Sri Lanka) in 1951–52, from which he emerged with mixed reviews. Many of the leading England players of the time opted out of this tour, Hutton included.

Lowson played in four of the five Tests against India, and made his highest Test score (68) in the first match. He scored more than 1,000 first-class runs on the tour, at an average of 44 runs per innings, but could average only 18 in the Tests. Wisden 's review of the tour said; "Lowson possessed more strokes and looked the most accomplished batsman on the side, but he had an unfortunate time in the Tests. His skill could not be denied and he seemed an England batsman all over, the only doubt being the question of temperament".

That tour marked the high-water mark of Lowson's career and he made only one further Test appearance, being an unsuccessful replacement for his county colleague Willie Watson at Headingley against the 1955 South Africans.

In county cricket, he did well in 1952, better in 1953 when he made his highest score, an unbeaten 259 against Worcestershire at New Road, and then performed well again in 1954. But Hutton's retirement in 1955 coincided with Lowson's worst season and though he returned to form in 1956, he was injured for part of 1957 and wholly out of form in 1958.

At the end of the 1958 season, Yorkshire having endured the least successful period in its history in terms of lack of County Championship success, the Yorkshire committee and new captain Ronnie Burnet decided to go for a policy of youth and dispensed with the services of several senior players, including Johnny Wardle, Bob Appleyard and Lowson. The move was a success in that Yorkshire won the Championship the following season, 1959, but Lowson went back to League cricket at the age of 33, and never played first-class cricket again. He went on to build a career in insurance.

Jim Kilburn, the former cricket correspondent of the Yorkshire Post, summed up Lowson's career when he wrote: "He had all the attributes of a Test cricketer except, perhaps, the driving force of ambition".

Lowson died in Pool-in-Wharfedale, Yorkshire, in September 1984, at the age of 59.

Lowson's family is still involved in the game. Two grandchildren of his cousin Charles (1921–2005) have been involved in the game, Alan Pritchard (born 1973) has played for Stafford Cricket Club whilst great-nephew (and grandson of Charles) Matthew (born 1990) is involved in the sport as an umpire.
