= 1966 English cricket season =

1966 was the 67th season of County Championship cricket in England. It featured an entertaining Test series between England and West Indies in which the great West Indian all-rounder Gary Sobers was outstanding. In domestic cricket, Yorkshire, led by Brian Close, won the County Championship. Close became England's captain too.

== Honours ==
- County Championship – Yorkshire
- Gillette Cup – Warwickshire
- Minor Counties Championship – Lincolnshire
- Second XI Championship – Surrey II
- Wisden – Bob Barber, Basil D'Oliveira, Colin Milburn, John Murray, Seymour Nurse

== Test series ==
West Indies won the series 3–1 with one match drawn.

== Leading batsmen ==
Gary Sobers topped the averages with 1,349 runs @ 61.31

== Leading bowlers ==
Derek Underwood topped the averages with 157 wickets @ 13.80

== Annual reviews ==
- Playfair Cricket Annual 1967
- Wisden Cricketers' Almanack 1967
