= Vic Wilson (cricketer) =

English cricketer (1921–2008)

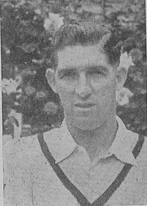

Personal information
- Full name: John Victor Wilson
- Born: 17 January 1921; Scampston, East Riding of Yorkshire, England
- Died: 5 June 2008 (aged 87); Yedingham, North Yorkshire, England
- Batting: Left-handed
- Bowling: Right-arm medium
- Role: Batsman

Domestic team information
- Years: Team
- 1946–1963: Yorkshire
- FC debut: 12 June 1946 Yorkshire v Warwickshire
- Last FC: 12 July 1963 MCC v Scotland

Career statistics
Competition	First-class
Matches	502
Runs scored	21,650
Batting average	31.33
100s/50s	30/119
Top score	230
Balls bowled	692
Wickets	9
Bowling average	48.33
5 wickets in innings	0
10 wickets in match	0
Best bowling	2/1
Catches/stumpings	549/–
- Source: CricInfo, 7 June 2008

John Victor Wilson (17 January 1921 – 5 June 2008) was an English first-class cricketer, who played for and captained Yorkshire County Cricket Club. He was born in Scampston near Norton-on-Derwent in the East Riding of Yorkshire (now in North Yorkshire).

Wilson made his first-class debut for Yorkshire in 1946, as a left-handed batsman, and a very occasional right-arm medium pace bowler. He was also an occasional wicket-keeper and a talented fielder close to the bat. In 1954–55, he was a surprise selection for the Marylebone Cricket Club (MCC) tour to Australia and New Zealand under Leonard Hutton, but he never adjusted to the fast pace of Australian pitches, and was not picked for any of the Test matches. He also represented MCC at home in 1962 and 1963.

Though he was by then far from guaranteed a place in the first team, Wilson survived the purge of Yorkshire's playing staff in 1958 which saw Johnny Wardle, Bob Appleyard and Frank Lowson leave the staff and a new young team take shape under the captaincy of Ronnie Burnet. After Burnet retired, Wilson was appointed as the first professional county captain of Yorkshire in 1960. He had a successful tenure, leading the club to the County Championship title in 1960 and 1962. He retired in 1962, and was succeeded by Brian Close for the 1963 season.

Wilson was a Wisden Cricketer of the Year in 1961.

Wilson died in his home in Yedingham, near Malton, on 5 June 2008, aged 87.
