= Aireborough Grammar School =

Coordinates: 53°52′04″N 1°42′06″W

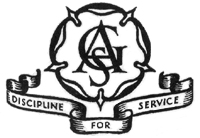
- Yeadon / Guiseley, West Yorkshire; England

Information
- Type: Grammar school
- Motto: Discipline for Service
- Established: 1910
- Closed: 1991
- Gender: Coeducational
- Age: 11 to 18
- Houses: Cavendish, Coverley, Fairfax, Forster
- Publication: The Bridge

Aireborough Grammar School was an English state grammar school situated on the Yeadon / Guiseley border in Aireborough, West Yorkshire. The school was founded in 1910 and closed in 1991.

== History ==
In January 1906, a meeting of Rawdon, Yeadon, Guiseley and Menston councils discussed a proposal to create a secondary school for Guiseley. The following May the first meeting of the governing body of Guiseley Secondary School took place. In April 1907, a site in Yeadon was decided upon and the school name was amended to become Yeadon and Guiseley Secondary School. Plans were agreed in October 1907 and construction began.

The school opened on 14 September 1910 with 71 pupils, and the official opening of Yeadon and Guiseley Secondary School took place on 4 November 1910. In 1937, the townships of Rawdon, Yeadon and Guiseley were amalgamated to form the Aireborough Urban District, at which time the name of the school changed to Aireborough Grammar School.

When the Butler Education Act 1944 came into force in 1945, the school became a county maintained secondary grammar school, and only admitted pupils who had passed the eleven plus exam. There was considerable building extension work undertaken in the early 1960s which was accompanied by significant increase in pupil numbers and, from 1974, facilitated the school's evolution into a comprehensive school. The Jubilee Review in 1985 alluded to the fact that "the future may well be uncertain". This proved true in May 1991 when the school closed, following which it was demolished and the land was developed as housing. There is some link with the old school, however, as the boundary wall opposite Nunroyd Park on New Road (A65) between Dibb Lane and West Side Retail Park incorporates the carved Rawdon, Yeadon, Guiseley and Menston stones from the facade of the school, and the street names of Coverley Rise and Fairfax Grove in the development pay a passing homage to two of the school houses.

== School houses ==
The school was divided into three houses in 1921:

- Coverley (purple and gold). The Calverley family once owned the school land. Dobson suggests there is some link from this family to Sir Roger de Coverley.
- Fairfax (green and yellow) was named after the Fairfax family who once owned the village of Menston.
- Forster (dark and light blue) was named after William Edward Forster who lived at Rawdon and drafted the Elementary Education Act 1870.

In 1937, at the time the school name changed to Aireborough Grammar School, a further house was introduced. This was Cavendish, named after the family name of the Duke of Devonshire, who owned land at nearby Bolton Abbey.

At some time before the early 1960s the house colours became:

- Cavendish: red
- Coverley: yellow
- Fairfax: green
- Forster: blue

== Notable former pupils ==
School alumni include:

- Hedley Verity (1905–1943), England cricketer whose 1932 innings analysis of 19.4-16-10-10 remains a world record in a first-class match
- Brian Close (1931–2015), youngest man ever to play Test cricket for England
- Vice Admiral Sir Richard Jeffrey Ibbotson KBE CB DSC, MSc, RN (1954– ), awarded the Distinguished Service Cross for operations in the First Gulf War, 1991
- Marc Almond (1957– ), English singer and recording artist; member of the duo Soft Cell
- Nigel Melville (1961– ), one of the few players to captain England rugby team on his debut appearance
- Richard Starkings (1962– ), creator of the Image Comic book series Elephantmen and 'Hip Flask; founder of the Comicraft design and lettering studio and comicbookfonts.com

== Notable staff members ==
- Ernest Tillotson MSc, FRAS, FGS (1904–1981), Physics teacher from 1927 to retirement; authority on British earthquakes; member of the Seismological subcommittee of the Royal Society; represented the United Kingdom at meetings of the European Seismological Committee

== Reunions ==
Two reunions have taken place since the closure of the school, both of which have been on Nunroyd Park, which is opposite the former school site.

- The first reunion was in 1992.
- The 2002 reunion is reported in the Keighley News archive. The school's opening and closing dates in this report are inaccurate.
