= Doug Padgett =

English cricketer (1934–2024)

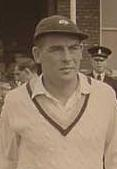

Personal information
- Full name: Douglas Ernest Vernon Padgett
- Born: 20 July 1934; Bradford, Yorkshire, England
- Died: 20 January 2024 (aged 89); Bradford, Yorkshire, England
- Batting: Right-handed
- Bowling: Right-arm medium

International information
- National side: England
- Test debut (cap 401): 21 July 1960 v South Africa
- Last Test: 18 August 1960 v South Africa

Domestic team information
- Years: Team
- 1951–1971: Yorkshire

Career statistics
| Competition | Test | FC | LA |
|---|---|---|---|
| Matches | 2 | 506 | 57 |
| Runs scored | 51 | 21,124 | 1,069 |
| Batting average | 12.75 | 28.58 | 20.96 |
| 100s/50s | –/– | 32/98 | –/2 |
| Top score | 31 | 161* | 68 |
| Balls bowled | 12 | 586 | 24 |
| Wickets | 0 | 6 | 1 |
| Bowling average | – | 36.00 | 25.00 |
| 5 wickets in innings | – | – | – |
| 10 wickets in match | – | – | – |
| Best bowling | – | 1/2 | 1/25 |
| Catches/stumpings | –/– | 261/– | 13/– |
- Source: Cricinfo, 24 January 2024

Douglas Ernest Vernon Padgett (20 July 1934 – 20 January 2024) was an English cricketer, who played more than 500 first-class matches and represented England in Tests twice, both in 1960. Cricket writer Colin Bateman recorded Padgett was, "nimble, happy anywhere in the order, he was a great technician and one of the best batsmen of his era on a bad wicket".

== Life and career ==
Born 20 July 1934, Padgett had an elder brother, Granville, who was also a professional cricketer. He played for Idle Cricket Club in 1951. In 1951, he became the youngest player then to play first-class cricket for Yorkshire, aged just 16 years and 320 days. Paul Jarvis broke Padgett's record in 1981.

Following his National Service, Padgett was one of the first of a new generation of Yorkshire batsmen to cement his place in the Yorkshire first team. He scored more than 1,000 runs in 1956, and in the County Championship-winning side of 1959 he was the leading batsman with more than 2,000 runs. He usually batted at No 3, though he occasionally opened the innings.

In 1960, a tour by the South Africans, widely perceived as weak, led the England Test selectors to experiment with new batsmen, and Padgett played in the fourth and fifth matches. He was not a great success, and was one of a number of England players criticised in The Oval Test match for slow batting in the second innings.

Padgett went to New Zealand the following winter on an extensive Marylebone Cricket Club (MCC) tour, but he was never picked again for England. Padgett failed to convert his innings into big scores, albeit registering 50 one hundred and twenty nine times in his first-class career, he reached the century mark only on thirty two occasions. This counted against him when the England selectors considered his promotion to further international duty. However, he remained a valued member of the Yorkshire side that won six further Championships across the 1960s. He scored more than 1,000 runs in twelve County Championship seasons.

Padgett retired from playing in 1971, much to the frustration of the new captain, Geoffrey Boycott, who relied on his counsel. Padgett then captained Yorkshire's second eleven, becoming assistant, then head coach.

Padgett died on 20 January 2024, at the age of 89.
