= 1979 English cricket season =

The 1979 English cricket season was the 80th in which the County Championship had been an official competition. The second Cricket World Cup was played and West Indies defeated England in the final. The County Championship was won by Essex for the first time.

== Honours ==
- County Championship - Essex
- Gillette Cup - Somerset
- Sunday League - Somerset
- Benson & Hedges Cup - Essex
- Minor Counties Championship - Suffolk
- Second XI Championship - Warwickshire II
- Wisden - Joel Garner, Sunil Gavaskar, Graham Gooch, Derek Randall, Brian Rose

== Annual reviews ==
- Playfair Cricket Annual 1980
- Wisden Cricketers' Almanack 1980
