= Ronnie Burnet =

English cricketer (1918–1999)

Personal information
- Full name: John Ronald Burnet
- Born: 11 October 1918; Saltaire, Yorkshire, England
- Died: 6 March 1999 (aged 80); Pateley Bridge, Yorkshire, England
- Batting: Right-handed
- Role: Batsman, captain

Domestic team information
- Years: Team
- 1958–1959: Yorkshire

Career statistics
Competition	First-class
Matches	55
Runs scored	897
Batting average	12.63
100s/50s	0/3
Top score	54
Balls bowled	18
Wickets	1
Bowling average	26.00
5 wickets in innings	–
10 wickets in match	–
Best bowling	1/8
Catches/stumpings	7/–
- Source: Cricket Archive, 7 September 2013

John Ronald Burnet OBE (11 October 1918 – 6 March 1999) was an English first-class cricketer and the last amateur captain of Yorkshire County Cricket Club. Yet despite this, and his modest playing record, he is remembered as a success in that his captaincy laid the foundation of Yorkshire's dominance of the County Championship during the 1960s.

== History ==
At 39 years old, Burnet was an experienced Bradford Cricket League batsman when he was appointed captain, despite having limited first-class playing experience. His leadership is credited with helping unify the team and improving Yorkshire's competitive performance during his tenure.

Surrey had won seven county championships in a row during the 1950s and Yorkshire were determined to end their dominance. Burnet was brought in to unite a faction-ridden dressing room after Billy Sutcliffe's ineffectual reign. Burnet had led Baildon to success in the Bradford League in the early 1950s, and proved himself an effective leader of Yorkshire's Second XI since 1953, the team winning the Minor Counties Championship under his command in 1957. The move was successful in the long term but painful in the short. Yorkshire finished out of the top ten for the first time in their history in his first year in charge after Johnny Wardle, the hugely talented left arm spinner, was sacked for disciplinary rather than playing reasons. This execution concentrated the minds of the remaining senior pros and in Burnets second and last season Yorkshire won the County Championship, something which would become a habit for the rest of the decade.

Burnet was a limited batsman in first-class terms, but his influence cannot be measured by his individual figures, rather by the effect his leadership had on the field. Batting right-handed, usually low down in the order, he scored 897 runs at just 12.63 with a best of 54, one of only 3 half centuries in 77 innings. He took a solitary wicket.

He served on the Yorkshire Cricket Committee as a Bradford representative from 1960 to 1969 and then for Harrogate district from 1978 until 1983 when another bout of civil war threatened to tear the club in two. The man at the centre of the storm was Geoff Boycott. Once again some senior members in the club felt that only by the sacrifice of a great player could harmony and success be restored to the team, but this time the members revolted, Boycott's supporters swept the committee and Burnet was voted out of power. He had put his leadership skills to good use in the meantime, however, and was the chairman of a chemical company for 23 years. Burnet served as president of the Bradford League from 1959 to 1969 and was awarded the OBE for his services to the Sport in Yorkshire and Humberside. He died in 1999, at the age of 80.

== Tributes to Burnet ==
Brian Close, one of Burnet's championship winning side, told the York Evening Press that "Ronnie put his heart and soul into Yorkshire cricket which was his life. He did an excellent job and was always a great encouragement to the younger lads who played under his captaincy. He was always great company to be in and I always enjoyed meeting up with him. I shall miss him very much."

Doug Padgett, the county's most prolific batsman in 1959 with 1,807 runs and Yorkshire's coach at the time of Burnet's death, said: "Ronnie turned the side round when he became captain. Everyone respected him and he had the ability to get the best out of his players who would go through hell and high water for him. He took over in troubled times but he stood no nonsense and he sorted things out. He did not pretend to being a first-class player himself but he turned us into a side which won seven championships and two Gillette Cup finals over a ten-year period."

Bob Platt, who opened the bowling with Fred Trueman in Burnet's team and rose to become Cricket Chairman, said: "Like so many others of my generation, I started off under Ronnie in the second team and I greatly admired and respected him. He was an outstanding man for Yorkshire County Cricket Club and he was always ready to give advice right up to the end. He was a strong leader and the man responsible for moulding most of the players who went on to win the championship so often."
