= 1909 English cricket season =

Cricket season review

The 1909 English cricket season was the 20th since the beginning of the County Championship in England and Wales. It featured a Test series between England and Australia, which the tourists won 2–1. Kent won the County Championship.

== Honours ==
- County Championship – Kent
- Minor Counties Championship – Wiltshire
- Wisden Cricketers of the Year – Warren Bardsley, Sydney Barnes, Douglas Carr, Arthur Day, Vernon Ransford. (Note: As announced in Wisden's 1910 edition.)

== Test series ==
Monty Noble's Australia defeated England 2–1 to retain the Ashes. Two matches were drawn.

== Bibliography ==
- tbc
