= 2020 English cricket season =

2020 t20 Blast
- Champions: Notts Outlaws
- Runners-up: Surrey
- Most runs: Daniel Bell-Drummond (423)
- Most wickets: Jake Ball (19)

Rachael Heyhoe Flint Trophy
- Champions: Southern Vipers
- Runners-up: Northern Diamonds
- Most runs: Georgia Adams (500)
- Most wickets: Charlotte Taylor (15)

Bob Willis Trophy
- Champions: Essex
- Runners-up: Somerset
- Most runs: Alastair Cook (563)
- Most wickets: Simon Harmer (38)

PCA Player of the Year
- Chris Woakes

Wisden Cricketers of the Year
- Jofra Archer, Pat Cummins, Simon Harmer, Marnus Labuschagne, Ellyse Perry

The 2020 English cricket season was originally scheduled to run between 2 April and 25 September. It was planned to have first-class, one-day and Twenty20 cricket competitions throughout England and Wales and as well as the launch of a new franchised 100-ball competition, The Hundred; it would have been the 131st year in which the County Championship would have been an official competition.

On 24 April 2020, in response to the COVID-19 pandemic, the England and Wales Cricket Board (ECB) confirmed that no professional cricket would be played in England before 1 July 2020. In late May 2020, the ECB looked at the scheduling of domestic cricket for the summer, with the Royal London One-Day Cup likely to be abandoned. The ECB also confirmed that no domestic cricket would be played before 1 August 2020. In June 2020, some clubs raised concerns about the logistics of travelling and the financial viability of playing first-class cricket, with 50-over matches being a more realistic possibility. On 29 June 2020, the ECB confirmed that the county cricket season would begin on 1 August 2020, with the formats to be agreed in early July.

On 7 July 2020, the majority of counties voted to play first-class and Twenty20 cricket, with the Royal London One-Day Cup being cancelled. The launch of The Hundred was also postponed to 2021 due to the pandemic. A one-off first-class competition, named the Bob Willis Trophy, was created to replace the County Championship, which was suspended until 2021; the counties were split into three regional groups with a final to be held at Lord's. The eight new women's regional teams played in the inaugural Rachael Heyhoe Flint Trophy.

As a result of the pandemic, the vast majority of clubs placed players and staff on furlough. The traditional start to the season between the County Championship teams and the six Marylebone Cricket Club University teams (MCCU) of England and Wales, was cancelled. The first two rounds of fixtures would have been first-class matches, with the ECB stating that the 2020 University Matches would have been the last ones to have first-class status.

Cricket returned on 8 July 2020 when England and the West Indies began a three-match test series behind closed doors at the Rose Bowl with subsequent Tests also played behind closed doors at Old Trafford.
