= 1967 English cricket season =

1967 was the 68th season of County Championship cricket in England. India and Pakistan both toured England and played in three-match Test series. England defeated Pakistan 2–0 and India 3–0. Yorkshire retained the County Championship title.

== Honours ==
- County Championship – Yorkshire
- Gillette Cup – Kent
- Minor Counties Championship – Cheshire
- Second XI Championship – Hampshire II
- Wisden – Asif Iqbal, Hanif Mohammad, Ken Higgs, Jim Parks, Nawab of Pataudi

== Test series ==
=== Pakistan tour ===
England played two series in 1967 and were very successful, beating India 3–0 and Pakistan 2–0. Ken Barrington scored a century in each of the three matches against Pakistan.

== Leading batsmen ==
Ken Barrington topped the averages with 2059 runs at 68.63.

== Leading bowlers ==
Derek Underwood topped the averages with 136 wickets at 12.39.

== Annual reviews ==
- Playfair Cricket Annual 1968
- Wisden Cricketers' Almanack 1968
