= 1957 English cricket season =

1957 was the 58th season of County Championship cricket in England. Surrey's run of success continued with a sixth successive title and this was the most decisive as they won 21 matches out of 28 and lost none. They finished with 312 points while runners-up Northamptonshire had 218. England defeated West Indies 3–0.

== Honours ==
- County Championship – Surrey
- Minor Counties Championship – Yorkshire Second XI
- Wisden Cricketers of the Year – Peter Loader, Arthur McIntyre, Collie Smith, Mickey Stewart, Clyde Walcott

== Test series ==
=== West Indies tour ===
England defeated West Indies 3–0 with two matches drawn. The first match, at Edgbaston, was crucial. England had appeared likely to lose it by an innings, until Peter May and Colin Cowdrey came together in a partnership of 411, then the fourth wicket Test record for all countries. May made 285* and Cowdrey 154. As a result, England saved (and nearly won) the match. The mastery that Sonny Ramadhin had enjoyed over English batsmen since 1950 was broken.

== County Championship ==
It was jokingly suggested that Surrey might still have won the title had they had no stumps to bowl at, for Mickey Stewart held 77 catches (only one short of Wally Hammond's record for a fielder), and Ken Barrington and Tony Lock each held 64.

== Leading players ==
Peter May topped the batting averages with 2,347 runs at an average of 61.76. Tony Lock topped the bowling averages with 212 wickets taken at 12.02 runs per wicket.
