= 1892 English cricket season =

Cricket season review

The 1892 English cricket season featured the third edition of the County Championship. Surrey set a record number of wins with thirteen of their sixteen matches to retain the title. George Lohmann and Bill Lockwood took over 100 wickets each in the 16 Championship matches. (Note: Any match listed in the ACS' Important Match Guide (1981) is historically important, and therefore of the highest standard, whether or not a scorecard might exist. The same applies to numerous matches discovered by researchers since 1981. For further information, see First-class cricket.)

== Honours ==
- County Championship – Surrey
- Wisden (Five Batsmen of the Year) – Herbie Hewett, Lionel Palairet, Walter Read, Stanley Scott, Andrew Stoddart

== County Championship ==
=== Final table ===
	Team	P	W	L	D	Pts
1	Surrey	16	13	2	1	11
2	Nottinghamshire	16	10	2	4	8
3	Somerset	16	8	5	3	3
4	Lancashire	16	7	5	4	2
5	Middlesex	16	7	6	3	1
6	Yorkshire	16	5	5	6	0
7	Gloucestershire	16	1	8	7	−7
7	Kent	16	2	9	5	−7
9	Sussex	16	1	12	3	−11

Points system:

- 1 for a win
- 0 for a draw
- -1 for a loss

=== Most runs in the County Championship ===
1892 County Championship – leading batsmen
Name	Team	Matches	Runs	Average	100s	50s
Herbie Hewett	Somerset	16	1047	40.26	1	9
Arthur Shrewsbury	Nottinghamshire	16	920	41.84	4	0
Walter Read	Surrey	16	896	40.72	3	3
Stanley Scott	Middlesex	15	861	39.13	1	5
Andrew Stoddart	Middlesex	16	848	30.28	1	2

=== Most wickets in the County Championship ===
1892 County Championship – leading bowlers
Name	Team	Matches	Balls bowled	Wickets taken	Average
Bill Lockwood	Surrey	16	3411	114	13.26
Arthur Mold	Lancashire	16	3315	104	13.70
George Lohmann	Surrey	15	4326	102	13.87
John Hearne	Middlesex	16	4299	100	16.23
William Attewell	Nottinghamshire	16	4756	97	12.79

== Overall first-class statistics ==
=== Leading batsmen ===
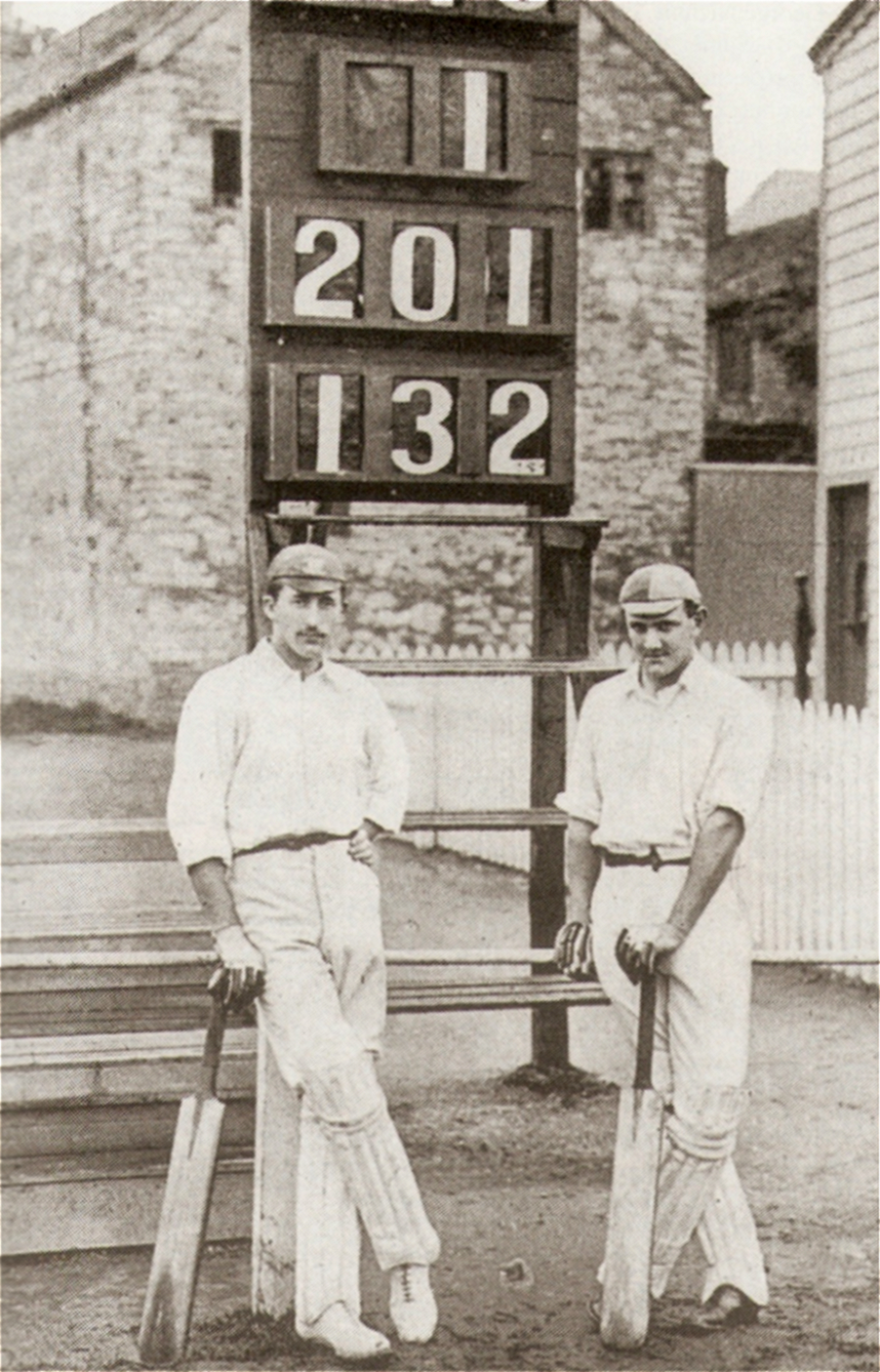
Lionel Palairet and Herbie Hewett of Somerset

1892 English cricket season – leading batsmen
Name	Team(s)	Matches	Runs	Average	100s	50s
Herbie Hewett	Gentlemen, Somerset, South of England	24	1407	35.17	1	11
Andrew Stoddart	Gentlemen, Marylebone Cricket Club (MCC), Middlesex, South of England	26	1403	31.17	1	7
Lionel Palairet	Gentlemen, Oxford University, Somerset	26	1343	31.97	2	7
Arthur Shrewsbury	North of England, Nottinghamshire, Players	22	1260	42.00	5	1
Billy Gunn	Marylebone Cricket Club (MCC), North of England, Nottinghamshire, Players	25	1120	30.27	1	6

=== Leading bowlers ===
1892 English cricket season – leading bowlers
Name	Team(s)	Matches	Balls bowled	Wickets taken	Average
John Hearne	Marylebone Cricket Club (MCC), Middlesex, South of England	25	6803	163	15.39
Sammy Woods	Gentlemen, Somerset, South of England	25	5284	153	16.83
Bill Lockwood	Players, Surrey	22	4452	151	13.60
George Lohmann	Players, South of England, Surrey	23	6069	151	15.33
William Attewell	Marylebone Cricket Club (MCC), North of England, Nottinghamshire, Players	26	7271	144	14.00

== Bibliography ==
- ACS (1981). A Guide to Important Cricket Matches Played in the British Isles 1709–1863. Nottingham: ACS. OCLC 85045528.
- ACS (1982). A Guide to First-class Cricket Matches Played in the British Isles. Nottingham: ACS. OCLC 10586869.
- Warner, Pelham (1946). Lords: 1787–1945. London: Harrap. OCLC 877106024.

== Annual reviews ==
- James Lillywhite's Cricketers' Annual (Red Lilly), Lillywhite, 1896
- Wisden Cricketers' Almanack, 1896
