= 1938 English cricket season =

1938 was the 45th season of County Championship cricket in England. England established a world record team total of 903 for seven declared against Australia at The Oval with Len Hutton contributing a record 364. The series ended in a 1–1 draw. Yorkshire were champions for the 20th time.

== Honours ==
- County Championship – Yorkshire
- Minor Counties Championship – Buckinghamshire
- Wisden – Hugh Bartlett, Bill Brown, Denis Compton, Kenneth Farnes, Arthur Wood

== Test series ==
England and Australia drew the five-Test series 1–1, with two matches drawn and one game abandoned without a ball being bowled, due to persistent, heavy rain.

Cumulative record - Test wins	1876–1938
England	55
Australia	57
Drawn	31

== Leading batsmen ==
Don Bradman topped the averages with 2429 runs @ 115.66

== Leading bowlers ==
Bill Bowes topped the averages with 121 wickets @ 15.23

== Annual reviews ==
- Wisden Cricketers' Almanack 1939
