= 1980 English cricket season =

The 1980 English cricket season was the 81st in which the County Championship had been an official competition. West Indies defeated England in the summer's Test series 1–0, rain ensuring that the other four matches were all drawn. A single Test was played between England and Australia to commemorate the centenary of the first Test played in England in 1880. The match was drawn. The County Championship was won by Middlesex.

== Honours ==
- County Championship – Middlesex
- Gillette Cup – Middlesex
- Sunday League – Warwickshire
- Benson & Hedges Cup – Northamptonshire
- Minor Counties Championship – Durham
- Second XI Championship – Glamorgan II
- Wisden – Kim Hughes, Robin Jackman, Allan Lamb, Clive Rice, Vintcent van der Bijl

== Test series ==
=== England vs West Indies ===
England was outplayed by West Indies and the margin would have been greater than 1–0 but for the weather. West Indies excelled in batting and fast bowling with Viv Richards, Desmond Haynes, Joel Garner, Andy Roberts and Michael Holding their standout performers. England's best player was Peter Willey who scored a fine century at The Oval.

=== England vs Australia ===
Cumulative record – Test wins	1876–1980
England	79
Australia	92
Drawn	69

== Leading batsmen ==
Allan Lamb of Northamptonshire CCC topped the averages with 1797 runs @ 66.55.

Other leading batsmen were Kepler Wessels and Peter Kirsten who both averaged over 60.

== Leading bowlers ==
Joel Garner of West Indies led the averages 13.93 and 49 wickets but the outstanding bowler of the season was Robin Jackman who took 121 wickets @ 15.40.

== Annual reviews ==
- Playfair Cricket Annual 1981
- Wisden Cricketers' Almanack 1981
