= 1958 English cricket season =

1958 was the 59th season of County Championship cricket in England. Surrey captain Peter May topped the batting averages for the third time and his team won a record seventh successive title. England defeated the touring New Zealand team 4–0 in a Test match series.

== Honours ==
- County Championship – Surrey
- Minor Counties Championship – Yorkshire Second XI
- Wisden Cricketers of the Year (awarded in the 1959 Wisden Cricketers' Almanack) – Les Jackson, Roy Marshall, Arthur Milton, John Reid, Derek Shackleton

== Test series ==
England defeated New Zealand 4–0 with one match drawn in a five match Test series.

== County Championship ==
The County Championship was won by Surrey County Cricket Club, the last of seven consecutive Championships for the county. Hampshire were runners-up.

== Leading players ==
Peter May topped the averages with 2,231 runs scored at a batting average of 63.74.

Les Jackson topped the bowling averages with 143 wickets taken at a bowling average of 10.99 runs per wicket.
