= 1956 English cricket season =

1956 was the 57th season of County Championship cricket in England. It is memorable for the performances of Jim Laker, especially his unique feat in taking a world record 19 wickets in the Old Trafford Test Match. He took a total of 46 wickets in the five Tests, a record in an England-Australia series. In May, he had taken all ten wickets in the Australian first innings in their match against Surrey, assisting Surrey to become the first county team since 1912 to defeat the Australians. Surrey won the County Championship for the fifth successive year to create a new record of consecutive titles won by one county.

== Honours ==
- County Championship – Surrey
- Minor Counties Championship – Kent II
- Wisden – Dennis Brookes, Jim Burke, Malcolm Hilton, Gil Langley, Peter Richardson

== Test series ==
Cumulative record - Test wins	1876–1956
England	62
Australia	70
Drawn	41

== Leading batsmen ==
Ken Mackay topped the averages with 1103 runs @ 52.52

== Leading bowlers ==
Tony Lock topped the averages with 155 wickets @ 12.46

== Annual reviews ==
- Playfair Cricket Annual 1957
- Wisden Cricketers' Almanack 1957
