= 1981 English cricket season =

The 1981 English cricket season was the 82nd in which the County Championship had been an official competition. A change of sponsorship ended the Gillette Cup and the knockout competition became the NatWest Trophy, which lasted for twenty years. Australia toured England to compete for the Ashes and England won the series 3–1. Nottinghamshire won a close struggle for the County Championship title, defeating Sussex by two points.

== Honours ==
- County Championship - Nottinghamshire
- NatWest Trophy - Derbyshire
- Sunday League - Essex
- Benson & Hedges Cup - Somerset
- Minor Counties Championship - Durham
- Second XI Championship - Hampshire II
- Wisden - Terry Alderman, Allan Border, Richard Hadlee, Javed Miandad, Rod Marsh

== Test Series ==
Cumulative record - Test wins	1876–1981
England	82
Australia	93
Drawn	71

== Sri Lankan tour ==
The second tour of England by the Sri Lankan team took place in 1981. Sri Lanka had not yet achieved Test status. The team played 13 first-class matches and 11 of these were drawn. In their other two games, the Sri Lankans won one and lost one.
