= 1985 English cricket season =

The 1985 English cricket season was the 86th in which the County Championship had been an official competition. England recovered The Ashes against an Australian team that had lost several players to a "rebel tour" of South Africa. The Britannic Assurance County Championship was won by Middlesex.

== Honours ==
- County Championship - Middlesex
- NatWest Trophy - Essex
- Sunday League - Essex
- Benson & Hedges Cup - Leicestershire
- Minor Counties Championship - Cheshire
- MCCA Knockout Trophy - Durham
- Second XI Championship - Nottinghamshire II
- Wisden - Phil Bainbridge, Richard Ellison, Craig McDermott, Neal Radford, Tim Robinson

== Test series ==
England won the Ashes thanks to the batting of Mike Gatting, Tim Robinson and David Gower; and some excellent seam bowling by Richard Ellison. As in 1981, this was another disappointing Australian team, but their recovery was complete by the time of their next visit in 1989.

| Cumulative record - Test wins | 1876–1985 |
|---|---|
| England | 86 |
| Australia | 96 |
| Drawn | 75 |

== Zimbabwe tour ==
Zimbabwe made their second tour of England and played in 8 first-class matches, mostly against county opposition.

== Leading batsmen ==
Viv Richards of Somerset topped the batting averages with 1836 runs at an average of 76.50.

The leading run scorer was Essex and England batsman Graham Gooch with 2208 runs at 71.22 from 33 innings.

== Leading bowlers ==
Richard Ellison of Kent and England topped the bowling averages, taking 65 wickets at an average of 17.20.

Worcestershire bowler Neal Radford was the leading wicket taker with 101, at an average of 24.68.

== External sources ==
- CricketArchive – season and tournament itineraries

== Annual reviews ==
- Playfair Cricket Annual 1986
- Wisden Cricketers' Almanack 1986
