= 1920 English cricket season =

1920 was the 27th season of County Championship cricket in England. There was no Test cricket as the post-war recovery continued. Middlesex rose from 13th in 1919 to win the championship as the first of two back-to-back titles. Worcestershire returned to the championship after opting out in 1919.

== Honours ==
- County Championship - Middlesex
- Minor Counties Championship - no competition
- Wisden - Plum Warner

== Leading batsmen ==
Patsy Hendren topped the averages with 2520 runs @ 61.46, just ahead of Jack Hobbs who scored 2827 @ 58.89.

== Leading bowlers ==
Jack Hobbs topped the bowling averages taking 17 wickets. The leading full-time bowler was Wilfred Rhodes with 161 wickets @ 13.18.

== Annual reviews ==
- Wisden Cricketers' Almanack 1921
