= 1954 English cricket season =

1954 was the 55th season of County Championship cricket in England. Pakistan toured England for the first time and drew the series of four Test matches. Surrey won the County Championship for the third successive year.

== Honours ==
- County Championship – Surrey
- Minor Counties Championship – Surrey II
- Wisden – Bruce Dooland, Fazal Mahmood, Eric Hollies, Brian Statham, George Tribe

== Test series ==
England could only draw the series with Pakistan 1–1, with the other two matches badly affected by the poor weather of the summer and left drawn. Pakistan won the final Test to square the series thanks to a marvellous seam bowling performance by Fazal Mahmood, who took 6-53 and 6–46 at The Oval.

== Leading batsmen ==
Denis Compton topped the averages with 1524 runs @ 58.62

== Leading bowlers ==
Brian Statham topped the averages with 92 wickets @ 14.13

== Annual reviews ==
- Playfair Cricket Annual 1955
- Wisden Cricketers' Almanack 1955
