= Tony Nicholson =

English cricketer

Personal information
- Full name: Anthony George Nicholson
- Born: 25 June 1938; Dewsbury, Yorkshire, England
- Died: 4 November 1985 (aged 47); Harrogate, Yorkshire, England
- Batting: Right-handed
- Bowling: Right-arm medium

Domestic team information
- Years: Team
- 1962–1975: Yorkshire
- FC debut: 7 July 1962 Yorkshire v Essex
- Last FC: 16 September 1975 Yorkshire v Essex
- LA debut: 12 June 1963 Yorkshire v Sussex
- Last LA: 31 August 1975 Yorkshire v Nottinghamshire

Career statistics
Competition	First-class	List A
Matches	283	120
Runs scored	1,669	155
Batting average	11.75	6.45
100s/50s	0/1	0/0
Top score	50	15*
Balls bowled	47,406	0
Wickets	879	5,862
Bowling average	19.76	17.05
5 wickets in innings	40	4
10 wickets in match	3	0
Best bowling	9/62	6/27
Catches/stumpings	85/–	16/–
- Source: CricketArchive, 27 September 2007

Anthony George Nicholson (25 June 1938 – 4 November 1985) was an English first-class cricketer, active 1962 to 1975, who played for Yorkshire as a right arm medium pace bowler and was a member of the club's five County Championship-winning teams between 1962 and 1968. He was born in Dewsbury and died in Harrogate. Nicholson was awarded his county cap after the 1963 season and a benefit for him in 1973 raised £13,214. He made 283 first-class appearances and 120 in limited overs cricket, taking 879 and 173 wickets respectively. Prior to joining Yorkshire, Nicholson was a policeman in Southern Rhodesia.

Nicholson's best seasons were 1966 and 1967 when, usually opening the bowling with Fred Trueman, he took over 100 wickets and played a key role in Yorkshire's title wins. Despite his successful county career, he never played Test cricket. He was selected for the England tour of South Africa in 1964–65 but was forced to withdraw because of an injury. His later career was dogged by ill health, caused by blood clots in his leg, which contributed to his early death.

Although he never managed international recognition, Nicholson was highly rated by the Yorkshire public. The county's Players Association holds a Tony Nicholson Memorial Trophy in his honour. At a time when retirement tended to be greeted with muted thanks by the Yorkshire committee, Nicholson was paid the warmest possible tribute.

== Bibliography ==
- Hodgson, Derek (1989). The Official History of Yorkshire County Cricket Club. The Crowood Press. ISBN 1852232749.
- Kilburn, J. M. (1970). A History of Yorkshire Cricket. Stanley Paul. ISBN 0091011108.
