= John Murray (cricketer, born 1935) =

English cricketer

Personal information
- Full name: John Thomas Murray
- Born: 1 April 1935; North Kensington, London, England
- Died: 24 July 2018 (aged 83)
- Batting: Right-handed
- Bowling: Right-arm medium
- Role: Wicketkeeper

International information
- National side: England
- Test debut: 8 June 1961 v Australia
- Last Test: 27 July 1967 v Pakistan

Career statistics
Competition	Test	FC	LA
Matches	21	635	149
Runs scored	506	18,872	2,281
Batting average	22.00	23.58	19.49
100s/50s	1/2	16/84	0/8
Top score	112	142	75*
Balls bowled	–	341	–
Wickets	–	6	–
Bowling average	–	40.50	–
5 wickets in innings	–	0	–
10 wickets in match	–	0	–
Best bowling	–	2/10	–
Catches/stumpings	52/3	1268/259	164/33
- Source: Cricinfo, 15 August 2022

John Thomas Murray MBE (1 April 1935 – 24 July 2018) was an English cricketer. He played in 21 Tests for England between 1961 and 1967.

== Life and career ==
Murray was educated at the St John's Church of England School in Notting Hill, London. He played football as a wing half in his youth and was part of the Brentford youth team which reached the semi-finals of the inaugural FA Youth Cup in the 1952–53 season.

Murray made his debut as a wicket-keeper for Middlesex in 1952, aged 17 years and 54 days. Most elegant behind the stumps, he is acknowledged as one of the most distinguished wicket-keepers in the history of the game. Such was his batting prowess that he scored 1,000 runs in a season six times with Middlesex, and scored a Test century in 1966, batting at number nine against the West Indies. He played for Middlesex in 508 first-class matches between 1952 and 1975, and for England in 21 Tests. His tally of 1,527 first-class dismissals set a world record until it was broken by Bob Taylor in 1983. Murray was selected as one of the Wisden Cricketers of the Year in 1967.

He later served as an England selector and on the Middlesex General Committee.

He married Colleen Bryan in 1958.They had a daughter Deborah and a son Nick.

He died on 24 July 2018 at the age of 83, having been taken ill at Lord's while watching a Middlesex match.
