= 1955 English cricket season =

1955 was the 56th season of County Championship cricket in England and there was a continuation of Surrey's complete dominance as they won a fourth successive championship title and a second consecutive Minor Counties title. England defeated South Africa 3–2.

== Honours ==
- County Championship – Surrey
- Minor Counties Championship – Surrey II
- Wisden – Colin Cowdrey, Doug Insole, Jackie McGlew, Hugh Tayfield, Frank Tyson

== Test series ==
England won a thrilling Test series against South Africa by 3–2. England won the first two matches and then South Africa equalised the series with wins in the 3rd and 4th matches. The fifth Test was therefore the decider and England, thanks to the spin bowling of Tony Lock and Jim Laker, won by 92 runs.

== Leading batsmen ==
Jackie McGlew topped the averages with 1871 runs @ 58.46.

== Leading bowlers ==
Bob Appleyard topped the averages with 85 wickets @ 13.01.

== Annual reviews ==
- Playfair Cricket Annual 1956
- Wisden Cricketers' Almanack 1956
