= 1960 English cricket season =

1960 was the 61st season of County Championship cricket in England. The County Championship was won by Yorkshire for the second successive year.

South Africa toured England, playing a five match Test series which England won 3–0. During the series there was a throwing controversy which saw umpire Frank Lee call South African fast bowler Geoff Griffin for throwing in the Lord's Test. This led to umpire Syd Buller repeatedly calling the Griffin for throwing in the following tour match. This ended Griffin's Test career and brought to a head worldwide discontent about throwing and "dragging" that had caused controversy for the previous two years.

== Honours ==
- County Championship - Yorkshire
- Minor Counties Championship - Lancashire Second XI
- Second XI Championship - Northamptonshire Second XI
- Wisden Cricketers of the Year - Neil Adcock, Ted Dexter, Roy McLean, Raman Subba Row, Vic Wilson

== Test series ==
England defeated South Africa 3–0 in a five match Test series.

== County Championship ==
Yorkshire won the County Championship for the second successive year. Lancashire were runners-up.

== Leading players ==
Raman Subba Row topped the batting averages with 1,503 runs scored at an average of 55.66. Brian Statham topped the bowling averages with 135 wickets taken at 12.31 runs per wicket.
