= Gordon Ross (writer) =

English sports journalist (1917–1985)

Gordon John Ross (1917 – 27 April 1985) was an English sports journalist and author, and a vice-president of Lancashire CCC.

Ross took up sports journalism after serving with the Royal Air Force in World War II. He was closely associated with numerous cricket publications. He succeeded Peter West as editor of the Playfair Cricket Annual in 1954, remaining in this role until his death. He edited the Cricketer Quarterly Facts and Figures and also the Playfair Cricket Monthly throughout the thirteen years of its existence.

Ross was an associate editor of Wisden Cricketers' Almanack (under Norman Preston) between 1978 and 1980, for whom he reviewed books (1979 and 1980) and wrote articles. His brochures covered football of both codes (he edited the Playfair Rugby Annual for many years) and his books included one on the University Boat Race, as well as a short history of cricket and other histories of Surrey CCC, such as The Surrey Story, West Indian cricket and the Gillette Cup. He worked regularly as a sports journalist for the Sunday Times, The Times, The Scotsman and the Sunday Telegraph.

As a consultant to Gillette and subsequently NatWest, Ross was directly involved with one-day county cricket from its inception in 1963. Although he was a consultant to Gillette, he refused to use its products.

Ross was a well-known and popular figure around English cricket grounds, always dapper and seldom seen without a red carnation in his buttonhole. He died suddenly at Lord's in April 1985 after watching a day's cricket. He and his wife Bobby had one son.
