= 1959 English cricket season =

1959 was the 60th season of County Championship cricket in England. The Second XI Championship was established and, as a result, the involvement of first-class counties Second XIs in the Minor Counties Cricket Championship began to end, although it took several years before all county second XIs switched to the new competition. The season marked the end of Surrey's sequence of seven Championships, with Yorkshire winning the title. England defeated India 5–0 in the home Test series.

== Honours ==
- County Championship – Yorkshire
- Minor Counties Championship – Warwickshire Second XI
- Second XI Championship – Gloucestershire Second XI
- Wisden Cricketers of the Year – Ken Barrington, Donald Carr, Ray Illingworth, Geoff Pullar, M. J. K. Smith

== Test series ==
England won all five Tests against a disappointing India, including three innings victories. This was the first time England had won all five Tests in a single series.

== County Championship ==
Yorkshire won the County Championship, ending Surrey's dominance of the competition. Gloucestershire finished second, level on points with Surrey.

== Leading players ==
India's Vijay Manjrekar topped the batting averages with 755 runs scored at an average of 68.63. M.J.K. Smith scored most runs, with 3,249 at an average of 57.94.

Brian Statham topped the bowling averages with 139 wickets taken at an average of 15.01 runs per wicket.
