= 1963 English cricket season =

1963 was the 64th season of County Championship cricket in England. Limited overs cricket began with the first edition of the knockout competition that was originally called the Gillette Cup. The highlight of the season was a memorable Test series between England and West Indies which the tourists won 3–1. Yorkshire won their second consecutive championship title. Off the field, the year saw the publication of the hundredth edition of Wisden Cricketers' Almanack, as well as the deaths of two cricketing knights, Sir Jack Hobbs and Sir Pelham Warner.

== Honours ==
- County Championship – Yorkshire
- Gillette Cup – Sussex
- Minor Counties Championship – Cambridgeshire
- Second XI Championship - Worcestershire II
- Wisden – Brian Close, Charlie Griffith, Conrad Hunte, Rohan Kanhai, Gary Sobers

== Test series ==
=== West Indies tour ===
There was a memorable series between England and West Indies. The tourists won 3–1 with one match drawn. The Lord's Test had one of their most anticipated finishes ever and all four results were possible with two balls to be bowled: it ended as a draw with England five runs behind and their last pair batting. Colin Cowdrey had gone in as number 11 with a broken arm, but did not have to face a ball.

As a result of the great success of this series, England's future home Test programme was revised so that West Indies could return in 1966, much earlier than originally planned. This was done by introducing "twin tours", in which two countries would each play three Tests against England in the course of a season.

== Leading batsmen ==
1963 English cricket season – leading batsmen by average
| Name | Innings | Runs | Highest | Average | 100s |
|---|---|---|---|---|---|
| Gary Sobers | 34 | 1333 | 112 | 47.60 | 4 |
| Mike Smith | 39 | 1566 | 144* | 47.45 | 3 |
| Geoff Boycott | 43 | 1628 | 165* | 45.22 | 3 |
| Basil Butcher | 34 | 1294 | 133 | 44.62 | 2 |
| Conrad Hunte | 37 | 1367 | 182 | 44.09 | 3 |
| Clive Inman | 51 | 1708 | 120* | 42.70 | 1 |
| Brian Bolus | 57 | 2190 | 202* | 41.32 | 5 |
| Ken Barrington | 45 | 1568 | 110* | 41.26 | 2 |

1963 English cricket season – leading batsmen by aggregate
| Name | Innings | Runs | Highest | Average | 100s |
|---|---|---|---|---|---|
| Brian Bolus | 57 | 2190 | 202* | 41.32 | 5 |
| Peter Richardson | 56 | 2110 | 172 | 39.07 | 5 |
| John Edrich | 55 | 1921 | 125 | 40.02 | 2 |
| Alan Jones | 58 | 1857 | 187* | 34.38 | 3 |
| Ken Suttle | 57 | 1854 | 141 | 34.98 | 3 |

== Leading bowlers ==
1963 English cricket season – leading bowlers by average
| Name | Balls | Maidens | Runs | Wickets | Average |
|---|---|---|---|---|---|
| Charlie Griffith | 4208 | 192 | 1527 | 119 | 12.83 |
| Fred Trueman | 5067 | 206 | 1955 | 129 | 15.15 |
| Ken Palmer | 6113 | 289 | 2234 | 139 | 16.07 |
| Alan Moss | 3857 | 249 | 1355 | 84 | 16.13 |
| David Sydenham | 4915 | 239 | 1753 | 108 | 16.23 |
| Brian Statham | 4746 | 168 | 1874 | 113 | 16.58 |

1963 English cricket season – leading bowlers by aggregate
| Name | Balls | Maidens | Runs | Wickets | Average |
|---|---|---|---|---|---|
| Derek Shackleton | 8325 | 583 | 2446 | 146 | 16.75 |
| Barry Knight | 6743 | 207 | 3042 | 140 | 21.72 |
| Ken Palmer | 6113 | 289 | 2234 | 139 | 16.07 |
| Fred Trueman | 5067 | 206 | 1955 | 129 | 15.15 |
| Don Shepherd | 7713 | 540 | 2373 | 126 | 18.83 |

== Annual reviews ==
- Playfair Cricket Annual 1964
- Wisden Cricketers' Almanack 1964
