= 1990 NatWest Trophy =

- Administrator: Test and County Cricket Board
- Cricket format: Limited overs cricket (60 overs per innings)
- Tournament format: Knockout
- Champions: Lancashire (5th title)
- Participants: 32
- Matches: 30
- Most runs: 327 Gehan Mendis (Lancashire)
- Most wickets: 10 Courtney Walsh (Gloucestershire)

The 1990 NatWest Trophy was the 10th NatWest Trophy. It was an English limited overs county cricket tournament which was held between 27 June and 1 September 1990. The tournament was won by Lancashire who defeated Northamptonshire by 7 wickets in the final at Lord's.

== Format ==
The seventeen first-class counties, were joined by thirteen Minor Counties: Berkshire, Buckinghamshire, Devon, Dorset, Durham, Hertfordshire, Lincolnshire, Norfolk, Oxfordshire, Shropshire, Staffordshire, Suffolk and Wiltshire. The Ireland and Scotland teams also participated. Teams who won in the first round progressed to the second round. The winners in the second round then progressed to the quarter-final stage. Winners from the quarter-finals then progressed to the semi-finals from which the winners then went on to the final at Lord's which was held on 1 September 1990.

=== First round ===
27 June 1990
(scorecard)

Nottinghamshire; 312/9 (60 overs)	v	Buckinghamshire; 120 all out (40.3 overs)
Chris Broad 115; Timothy Barry 3/49 (12 overs)		Stephen Lynch 46; Kevin Cooper 3/16 (8 overs)

Nottinghamshire won by 192 runs
Pound Lane, Marlow
Umpires: Peter Eele & Donald Thompsett
Player of the match: Chris Broad (Nottinghamshire)

27 June 1990
(scorecard)

Shropshire; 184/8 (60 overs)	v	Derbyshire; 186/3 (38.1 overs)
John Abrahams 47; Alan Warner 4/39 (12 overs)		John Morris 94*; Brian Shantry 2/47 (10 overs)

Derbyshire won by 7 wickets
Queen's Park, Chesterfield
Umpires: Jack Bond & John Holder
Player of the match: John Morris (Derbyshire)

27 June 1990
(scorecard)

Somerset; 413/4 (60 overs)	v	Devon; 67 all out (30.3 overs)
Chris Tavaré 162*; Robert Dawson 1/37 (4 overs)		Keith Donohue 18*; Roland Lefebvre 7/15 (9.3 overs)

Somerset won by 346 runs
Recreation Ground, Torquay
Umpires: David Halfyard & Ray Julian
Player of the match: Chris Tavaré (Somerset)

27 June 1990
(scorecard)

Scotland; 200 all out (59.3 overs)	v	Essex; 202/1 (42.4 overs)
Omar Henry 53; Neil Foster 3/26 (12 overs)		Graham Gooch 103*; Andrew Bee 1/27 (10 overs)

Essex won by 9 wickets
County Ground, Chelmsford
Umpires: John Hampshire & Harold Rhodes
Player of the match: Graham Gooch (Essex)

27, 28 June 1990
(scorecard)

Glamorgan; 295/4 (60 overs)	v	Dorset; 261/8 (60 overs)
Viv Richards 118; Richard Merriman 2/32 (3 overs)		Giles Reynolds 60; Mark Frost 3/50 (12 overs)

Glamorgan won by 34 runs
St. Helen's, Swansea
Umpires: Derek Dennis & Allan Jones
Player of the match: Viv Richards (Glamorgan)

- Match was scheduled for one day but extended to two.

27 June 1990
(scorecard)

Gloucestershire; 325/4 (60 overs)	v	Lincolnshire; 130 all out (49 overs)
Tony Wright 92; David Marshall 2/63 (12 overs)		Neil Priestley 54; Mark Alleyne 5/30 (10 overs)

Gloucestershire won by 195 runs
Wagon Works Ground, Gloucester
Umpires: John Harris & Terry Spencer
Player of the match: Tony Wright (Gloucestershire)

27 June 1990
(scorecard)

Warwickshire; 336/7 (60 overs)	v	Hertfordshire; 208 all out (53.1 overs)
Asif Din 66; David Surridge 3/61 (12 overs)		David Smith 39; Asif Din 5/40 (8 overs)

Warwickshire won by 128 runs
Clarence Park, St Albans
Umpires: Vanburn Holder & Alan Whitehead
Player of the match: Asif Din (Warwickshire)

27 June 1990
(scorecard)

Durham; 164 all out (55.2 overs)	v	Lancashire; 165/2 (34.1 overs)
Gary Brown 42 (127); Paul Allott 3/24 (10 overs)		Gehan Mendis 62 (95); Jamie Sykes 1/16 (6 overs)

Lancashire won by 8 wickets
Old Trafford, Manchester
Umpires: Brian Harrison & Barrie Leadbeater
Player of the match: Neil Fairbrother (Lancashire)

27 June 1990
(scorecard)

Hampshire; 226/7 (60 overs)	v	Leicestershire; 225/8 (60 overs)
Chris Smith 52; Jon Agnew 2/44 (10 overs)		Peter Willey 72*; Rajesh Maru 3/46 (12 overs)

Hampshire won by 1 run
Grace Road, Leicester
Umpires: Dickie Bird & Basher Hassan
Player of the match: Peter Willey (Leicestershire)

29 June 1990
(scorecard)

Berkshire; 204/6 (60 overs)	v	Middlesex; 208/6 (50.3 overs)
David Shaw 36; Norman Cowans 2/25 (10 overs)		Mike Gatting 79*; David Hartley 3/35 (9.3 overs)

Middlesex won by 4 wickets
Lord's, London
Umpires: John Jameson & Ken Palmer
Player of the match: Mike Gatting (Middlesex)

27 June 1990
(scorecard)

Northamptonshire; 360/2 (60 overs)	v	Staffordshire; 144/7 (60 overs)
Alan Fordham 130; David Blank 2/74 (12 overs)		Anthony Dutton 32; Rob Bailey 1/2 (2 overs)

Northamptonshire won by 216 runs
County Ground, Northampton
Umpires: David Fawkner-Corbett & Nigel Plews
Player of the match: Alan Fordham (Northamptonshire)

27 June 1990
(scorecard)

Kent; 234/6 (60 overs)	v	Oxfordshire; 132 all out (49 overs)
Vince Wells 100*; Rupert Evans 3/46 (12 overs)		Geoffrey Ford 26; Danny Kelleher 3/16 (9 overs)

Kent won by 102 runs
Christ Church Ground, Oxford
Umpires: David Constant & Sam Cook
Player of the match: Vince Wells (Kent)

27 June 1990
(scorecard)

Suffolk; 177 all out (59.4 overs)	v	Worcestershire; 181/2 (48 overs)
Michael McEvoy 55; Stuart Lampitt 5/22 (11.4 overs)		Graeme Hick 78*; Andrew Golding 2/29 (12 overs)

Worcestershire won by 8 wickets
Victory Ground, Bury St Edmunds
Umpires: Don Oslear & Bob White
Player of the match: Stuart Lampitt (Worcestershire)

27 June 1990
(scorecard)

Wiltshire; 166/9 (60 overs)	v	Surrey; 170/1 (36.1 overs)
Paul Bail 66; Waqar Younis 3/23 (12 overs)		Chris Bullen 93*; Andrew Mildenhall 1/32 (8 overs)

Surrey won by 9 wickets
Trowbridge Cricket Club Ground, Trowbridge
Umpires: Kevin Lyons & Ray Tolchard
Player of the match: Chris Bullen (Surrey)

27 June 1990
(scorecard)

Norfolk; 104 all out (47.5 overs)	v	Yorkshire; 106/0 (20.2 overs)
Roger Finney 25; Phil Carrick 3/8 (12 overs)		Martyn Moxon 56*

Yorkshire won by 10 wickets
Headingley, Leeds
Umpires: Barrie Meyer & Tommy Wilson
Player of the match: Phil Carrick (Yorkshire)

27 June 1990
(scorecard)

Ireland; 72 all out (49 overs)	v	Sussex; 73/1 (15.1 overs)
Stephen Warke 22; Tony Dodemaide 6/9 (11 overs)		Neil Lenham 41*; Alan Nelson 1/27 (5 overs)

Sussex won by 8 wickets
The Meadow, Downpatrick
Umpires: Chris Balderstone & Barry Dudleston
Player of the match: Tony Dodemaide (Sussex)

=== Second round ===
11 July 1990
(scorecard)

Derbyshire; 241 all out (56.5 overs)	v	Lancashire; 242/7 (59.2 overs)
John Morris 74; Wasim Akram 4/34 (10.5 overs)		Mike Atherton 55; Devon Malcolm 3/54 (12 overs)

Lancashire won by 3 wickets
County Ground, Derby
Umpires: Mervyn Kitchen & Ken Palmer
Player of the match: Mike Atherton (Lancashire)

11 July 1990
(scorecard)

Essex; 307/6 (60 overs)	v	Hampshire; 307/5 (60 overs)
Graham Gooch 144; Malcolm Marshall 2/45 (12 overs)		Chris Smith 106; Derek Pringle 2/64 (12 overs)

Hampshire won by losing fewer wickets
County Ground, Chelmsford
Umpires: Jack Bond & John Harris
Player of the match: Chris Smith (Hampshire)

11 July 1990
(scorecard)

Glamorgan; 283/5 (60 overs)	v	Sussex; 249 all out (55.5 overs)
Viv Richards 74*; Andrew Clarke 2/53 (12 overs)		Alan Wells 85; Steve Watkin 3/18 (11.5 overs)

Glamorgan won by 34 runs
Sophia Gardens, Cardiff
Umpires: Peter Eele & Roy Palmer
Player of the match: Viv Richards (Glamorgan)

11 July 1990
(scorecard)

Kent; 181/9 (60 overs)	v	Gloucestershire; 182/4 (48.3 overs)
Trevor Ward 47; Courtney Walsh 6/21 (12 overs)		Phil Bainbridge 56*; Graham Cowdrey 1/13 (2.3 overs)

Gloucestershire won by 6 wickets
The Royal & Sun Alliance County Ground, Bristol
Umpires: Basher Hassan & Kevin Lyons
Player of the match: Courtney Walsh (Gloucestershire)

11 July 1990
(scorecard)

Surrey; 288/8 (60 overs)	v	Middlesex; 291/5 (59.4 overs)
Monte Lynch 59; Angus Fraser 4/44 (12 overs)		Mark Ramprakash 104; Waqar Younis 2/39 (12 overs)

Middlesex won by 5 wickets
Uxbridge Cricket Club Ground, Uxbridge
Umpires: Nigel Plews & Donald Thompsett
Player of the match: Keith Brown (Middlesex)

11 July 1990
(scorecard)

Northamptonshire; 274/6 (60 overs)	v	Nottinghamshire; 250 all out (57.1 overs)
David Capel 101; Franklyn Stephenson 2/40 (12 overs)		Tim Robinson 61; Rob Bailey 3/47 (10 overs)

Northamptonshire won by 24 runs
County Ground, Northampton
Umpires: John Hampshire & Peter Wight
Player of the match: David Capel (Northamptonshire)

11 July 1990
(scorecard)

Somerset; 283/5 (60 overs)	v	Worcestershire; 284/3 (57.2 overs)
Chris Tavaré 99*; Stuart Lampitt 2/48 (12 overs)		Tim Curtis 112; Roland Lefebvre 2/46 (12 overs)

Worcestershire won by 7 wickets
County Ground, Taunton
Umpires: Barry Dudleston & David Shepherd
Player of the match: Tim Curtis (Worcestershire)

11 July 1990
(scorecard)

Warwickshire; 241/9 (60 overs)	v	Yorkshire; 242/0 (55 overs)
Asif Din 58; Phil Carrick 3/26 (12 overs)		Ashley Metcalfe 127*

Yorkshire won by 10 wickets
Headingley, Leeds
Umpires: Dickie Bird & Bob White
Player of the match: Martyn Moxon (Yorkshire)

=== Quarter-finals ===
1 August 1990
(scorecard)

Hampshire; 229/9 (60 overs)	v	Yorkshire; 118 all out (39 overs)
Mark Nicholas 50; Peter Hartley 5/46 (12 overs)		Peter Hartley 52; Malcolm Marshall 4/18 (8 overs)

Hampshire won by 111 runs
County Ground, Southampton
Umpires: Ray Julian & Roy Palmer
Player of the match: Peter Hartley (Yorkshire)

1 August 1990
(scorecard)

Lancashire; 372/5 (60 overs)	v	Gloucestershire; 131 all out (30 overs)
Mike Watkinson 90; Courtney Walsh 2/69 (12 overs)		Dean Hodgson 52; Mike Watkinson 3/14 (5 overs)

Lancashire won by 241 runs
Old Trafford, Manchester
Umpires: Barrie Leadbeater & Keith Lyons
Player of the match: Mike Watkinson (Lancashire)

1 August 1990
(scorecard)

Glamorgan; 213/7 (60 overs)	v	Middlesex; 216/1 (50.1 overs)
Alan Butcher 104*; John Emburey 3/27 (12 overs)		Desmond Haynes 75*; Adrian Dale 1/14 (3 overs)

Middlesex won by 9 wickets
Lord's, London
Umpires: Allan Jones & Don Oslear
Player of the match: Alan Butcher (Glamorgan)

1 August 1990
(scorecard)

Northamptonshire; 263 all out (59.1 overs)	v	Worcestershire; 259/9 (60 overs)
Alan Fordham 96; Phil Newport 4/46 (12 overs)		Ian Botham 86*; Mark Robinson 3/33 (12 overs)

Northamptonshire won by 4 runs
County Ground, Northampton
Umpires: Chris Balderstone & Mervyn Kitchen
Player of the match: Ian Botham (Worcestershire)

=== Semi-finals ===
15 August 1990
(scorecard)

Northamptonshire; 284 all out (60 overs)	v	Hampshire; 283 all out (60 overs)
Allan Lamb 58; Cardigan Connor 4/73 (12 overs)		David Gower 86; Nick Cook 3/52 (12 overs)

Northamptonshire won by 1 run
County Ground, Southampton
Umpires: Kevin Lyons & Alan Whitehead
Player of the match: Malcolm Marshall (Hampshire)

15, 16, 17 August 1990
(scorecard)

Middlesex; 296/4 (60 overs)	v	Lancashire; 299/5 (55.5 overs)
Desmond Haynes 149*; Paul Allott 1/40 (12 overs)		Gehan Mendis 121*; Angus Fraser 2/43 (11.5 overs)

Lancashire won by 5 wickets
Old Trafford, Manchester
Umpires: David Constant & Barrie Meyer
Player of the match: Gehan Mendis (Lancashire)

- Match was scheduled for one day but extended to three.

=== Final ===
1 September 1990
(scorecard)

Northamptonshire; 171 all out (60 overs)	v	Lancashire; 173/3 (45.4 overs)
Curtly Ambrose 48 (94); Phil DeFreitas 5/26 (12 overs)		Neil Fairbrother 81 (68); Mark Robinson 1/26 (9 overs)

Lancashire won by 7 wickets
Lord's, London
Umpires: John Holder & David Shepherd
Player of the match: Phil DeFreitas (Lancashire)
