= Kirkgate Shopping Centre =

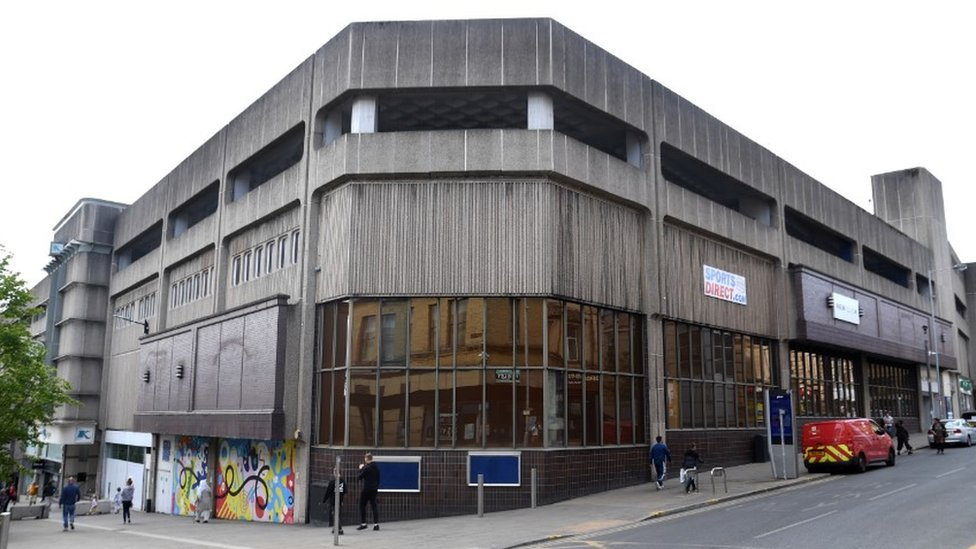
- Interactive map of the Kirkgate Shopping Centre area
- Former names: Kirkgate Market
- Alternative names: Kirkgate Arndale Centre

General information
- Status: Permanently closed
- Architectural style: Brutalist
- Location: Kirkgate Centre, Bradford, West Yorkshire BD1 1TQ., Bradford, West Yorkshire
- Coordinates: 53.795086°N 1.754936°W
- Years built: 1872 (Market); 1973 (Shopping Centre)
- Opened: 22 November 1973
- Closed: 18 June 2026
- Demolished: 1973 (original market)
- Owner: Bradford Metropolitan District Council

Technical details
- Floor area: 350,000 (sq ft)

Design and construction
- Architects: Lockwood and Mawson (1872), John Brunton & Partners (1973)
- Known for: Local Marketplace

Other information
- Parking: 650 spaces

Website
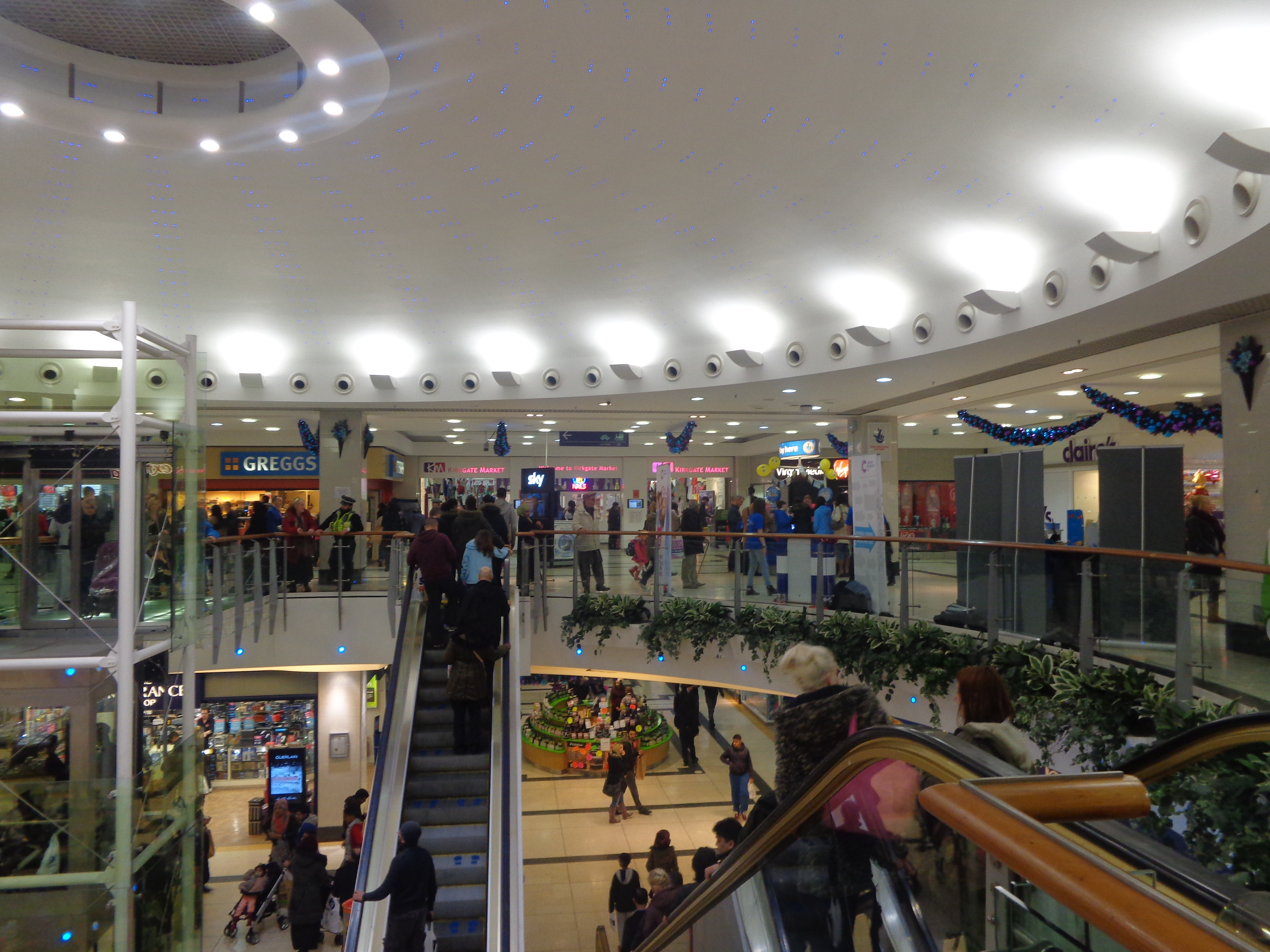
- https://www.kirkgate.co.uk/ Interior of the Kirkgate Shopping Centre in Bradford, November 2014.

Kirkgate Shopping Centre, known locally and historically as Kirkgate Market, was a shopping centre located in the city centre of Bradford, United Kingdom. The former marketplace closed its doors on June 18, 2026.

Originally opening in 1872 as a market, the original market operated for just over a century. The site of the original marketplace was demolished in 1973 and reopened the same year as a shopping centre on the 22nd November 1973 with a notable brutalist architecture designed by John Brunton & Partners who also designed other brutalist buildings in the city, such as High Point.

The shopping centre contained multiple floors with 350,000sq ft of retail space, including an indoor market, 60 retail units, 10 kiosks, a 650 space secured car park.

The shopping centre, along with the former John Street Market, is planned to be demolished in 2026 as part of a city centre regeneration scheme for Bradford in line with a UK City of Culture 2025 bid. The former shopping centre will be replaced by public garden areas, residential plots composed of new build housing and a new Darley Street Market.

== History ==
Prior to the 19th century, the site was occupied by Manor Hall as well as a marketplace - operating as an early trading area for the city with the original access to the manor being where is now Peel Park, Bradford. The original site also contained a cemetery adjacent to the original Kirkgate Wesleyan Chapel. A headstone dedicated to the original deceased was moved to Bowling Cemetery in 1890.

The site of the original market was developed during the 19th century, with the original Victorian market building being built in 1872 - designed by Lockwood & Mawson who also designed other buildings and areas around the Bradford area such as St George's Hall, The Wool Exchange and Saltaire Village - A current UNESCO World Heritage Site built by Sir Titus Salt.

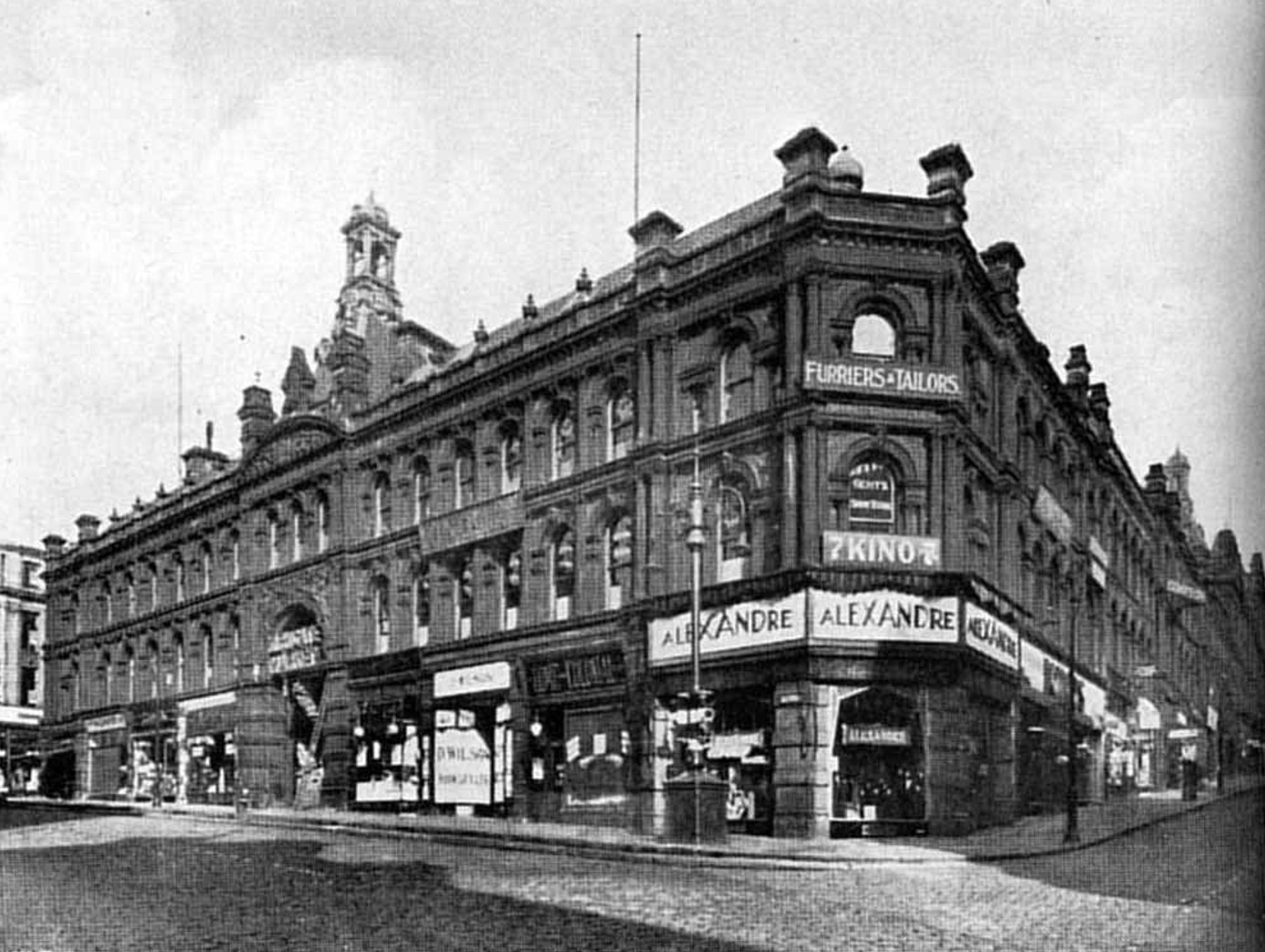
Kirkgate Market, Bradford, Pre-1973

During the 1970s, the original market place became scheduled for demolition and replacement with a new shopping centre. During the demolition process, multiple protests were held as the market was liked among the local people. Ultimately, the construction of the new shopping centre was completed on 22 November 1973 and opened by the then Lord Mayor of Bradford, Derek Smith.

After the demolition, some decorations and items from the old Victorian market were retained by Bradford Council's museum service, notably, Kirkgate's ornate market gates which most recently were displayed at the Coalbrookdale Museum of Iron, Shropshire on a long-term loan.

In 1979, 6 years after opening its doors, the shopping centre won the 1979 European Award from the International Council of Shopping Centres.

The 1980s-2000s enjoyed a relative period of success for the market with businesses generally performing well. The centre was owned by Prudential until 2006 when it was sold to the Mall Corporation as part of a £537 million deal with 3 other shopping centres: Luton Point, Luton; The Belfry Redhill; and The Pavilions, Uxbridge. Crownway Investments bought the centre in 2006 for €117 million (£83 million) from the Mall Corporation a few weeks after the original sale from Prudential to The Mall Corporation. The centre was the first shopping centre in Bradford to trade on Sundays and to ban smoking inside the centre in 2004.

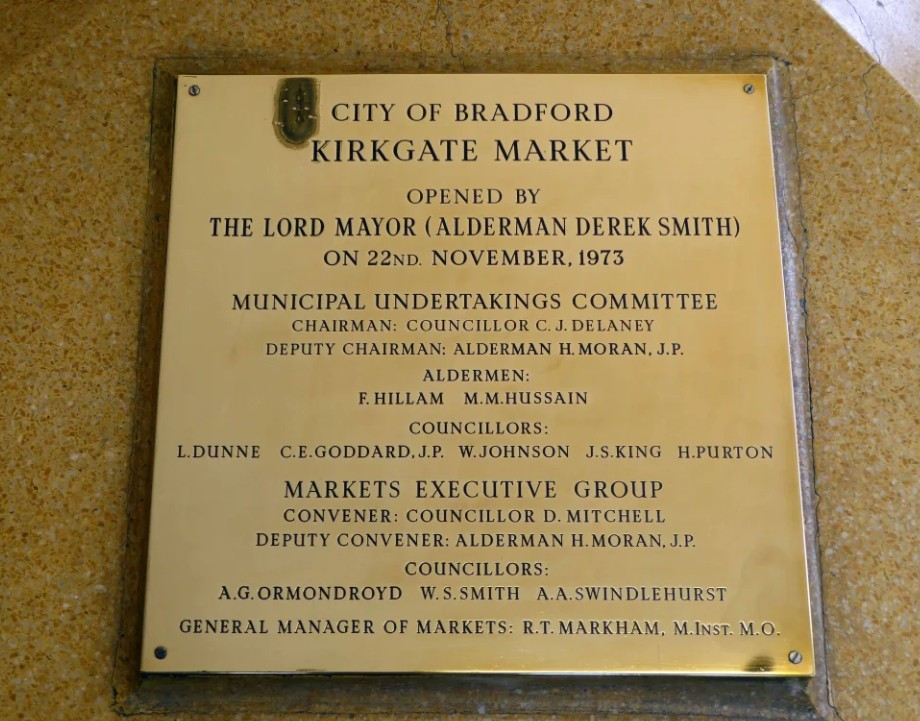
Plaque Commemorating the Opening of the Kirkgate Shopping Centre in 1973.

In 2009, the Anglo Irish Bank, who had originally provided the loan to Crownway Investments to buy the Kirkgate Shopping Centre, stated that the property had declined 35% in value since the original valuation, fueling debt in the centre amplified by the 2007-2009 global recession. Ultimately, the centre was sold again to HIG Capital in December 2015 for ~£60 million. On 5 November 2015, The Broadway Shopping Centre built by Westfield Corporation was opened in Bradford by Alexandre Burke, representative of Bradford City and the Bradford Burns Unit after almost two decades of planning. Competition from The Broadway, along with general urban decay, the online retail shift and rejection of building listed status impacted business at Kirkgate Market leading to a major decline for the shopping centre.

Following major decline, Kirkgate Shopping Centre was bought by Bradford Metropolitan District Council in 2022 for £15.5 million with plans to demolish the centre and replace it with residential and garden areas. Commercially, a new market called Darley Street Market is expected to replace the centre, with the gates to the original Victorian Kirkgate Market being moved to the new Darley Street Market. As of October 2025, there is currently no date set for the demolition of the current Kirkgate Shopping Centre.

== Design and controversy ==
The design is of a concrete, brutalist structure replacing the original Victorian architecture, the design was described by Historic England as having a "bulky, monolithic appearance" with repetition of key brutalist features and uniform elevations, with the car park having a continuous flat roofline. The design is similar to the now demolished Tricorn Centre, Portsmouth of Owen Luder Partnership. The modern 1973 shopping centre was designed by Donald Clark of the Bradford-based architectural firm John Brunton & Partners, who also designed other brutalist buildings in the city and around the country, including High Point, Bradford and the Bradford & Bingley headquarters. John Brunton & Partner's ultimately went out of business in 1993.

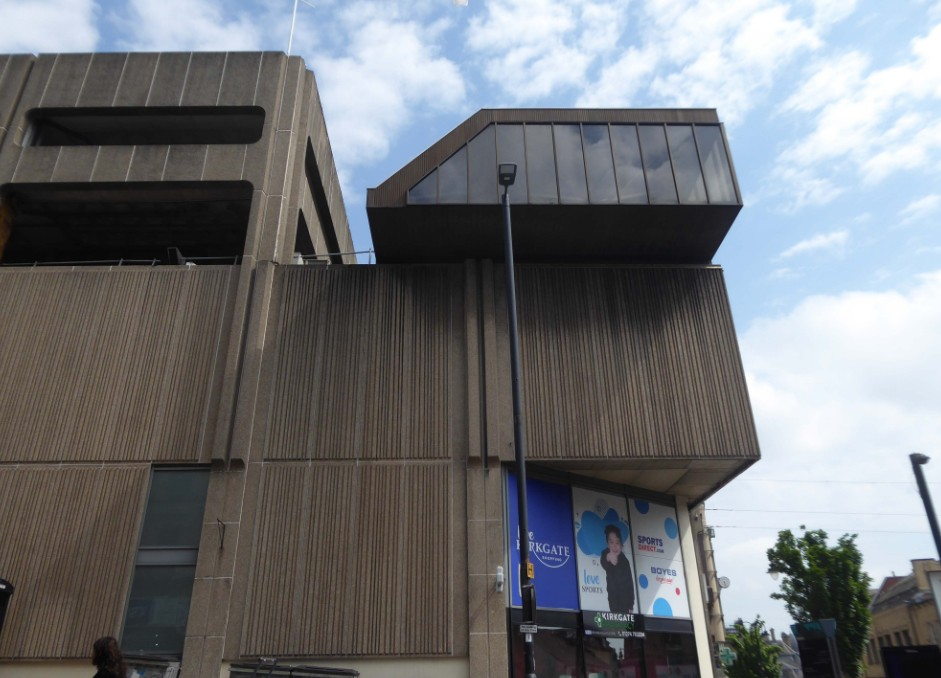
Kirkgate Market, an example of Brutalist architecture

The brutalist design of the building was referenced in the Historic England report when the original application for listed status was rejected, a decision which led to the approval for the centre's demolition. The report described the design as "mundane and repetitive" and "lacking architectural flair" despite having a "role in urban rebuilding projects of the 1970s" - adding that despite the centre's role in the 1970s urban rebuilding of Bradford "this does not compensate for its lack of architectural interest". Dr. Otto Saumarez Smith, architectural and urban historian of the University of Warwick, disagreed with findings contained in the report stating that "I utterly reject that Kirkgate is 'built to a standardised design with mundane, repetitive features that lack ambition". Among the local population, the brutalist architecture divided opinion and caused mild controversy.

Demolition of the original Victorian market caused an upset among some of the local population in the early 1970s, with some protests at the demolition of the perceived "magnificent" market.
