= Andrew Bee =

Andrew Bee may refer to:

- Andrew Bee (soldier), American Civil War soldier
- Andrew Bee (cricketer) (born 1965), Scottish cricketer
