= The Broadway, Bradford =

Coordinates: 53.7945°N 1.7497°W

The Broadway
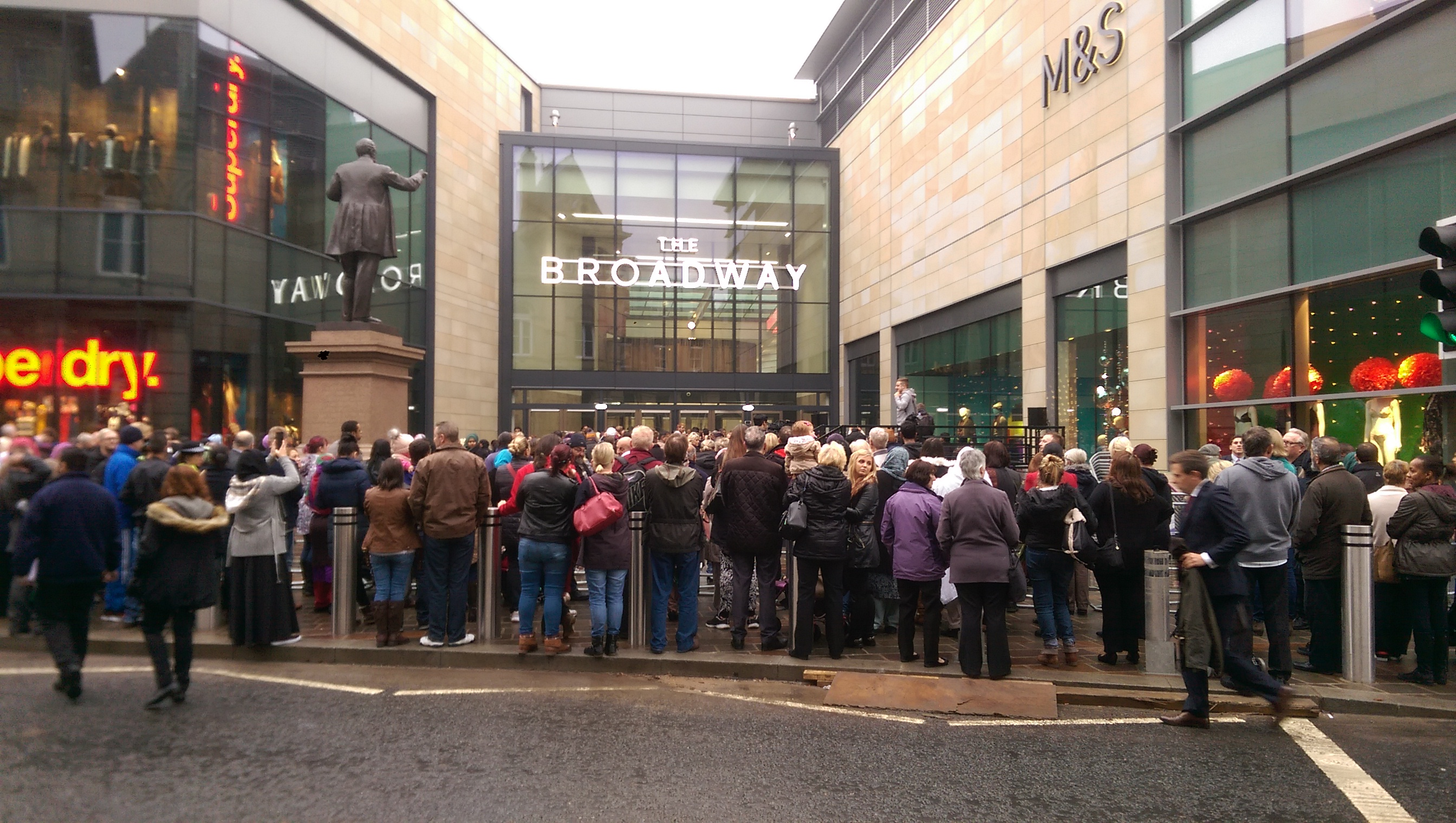
- Crowds waiting to watch Alexandra Burke open the centre on 5 November 2015
- Location: Bradford, England
- Opened: 5 November 2015; 11 years ago
- Developer: Westfield Corporation/Meyer Bergman
- Manager: Munroe K
- Owner: Eurofund Group
- Num. of stores: 82
- Num. of anchor tenants: 3 (Next and Primark, 1 vacant)
- Floor area: 570,000 sq ft (53,000 m^{2})
- Floors: 1 and 570,000 Sq feet of retail spaces
- Parking: 1300 chargeable parking spaces
- Website: The Broadway Bradford

The Broadway is a shopping and leisure complex in the centre of Bradford, West Yorkshire, England, which opened on 5 November 2015. It was built and was operated, in its first year, by the Westfield Corporation. It is currently owned by Eurofund Group and is currently operated by Munroe K Asset Management Ltd.

Buildings were demolished and roads rerouted to make way for the development in 2004; but because of continued failure to secure buy-in from enough businesses, construction did not begin in earnest until January 2014: for most of the intervening years, the site had little apart from a deep excavation, though from 2010 the area round the edge of the site was laid out as an urban park.

The "hole in the ground" was very unpopular in Bradford, and at one point the site was occupied by protestors.

== History ==
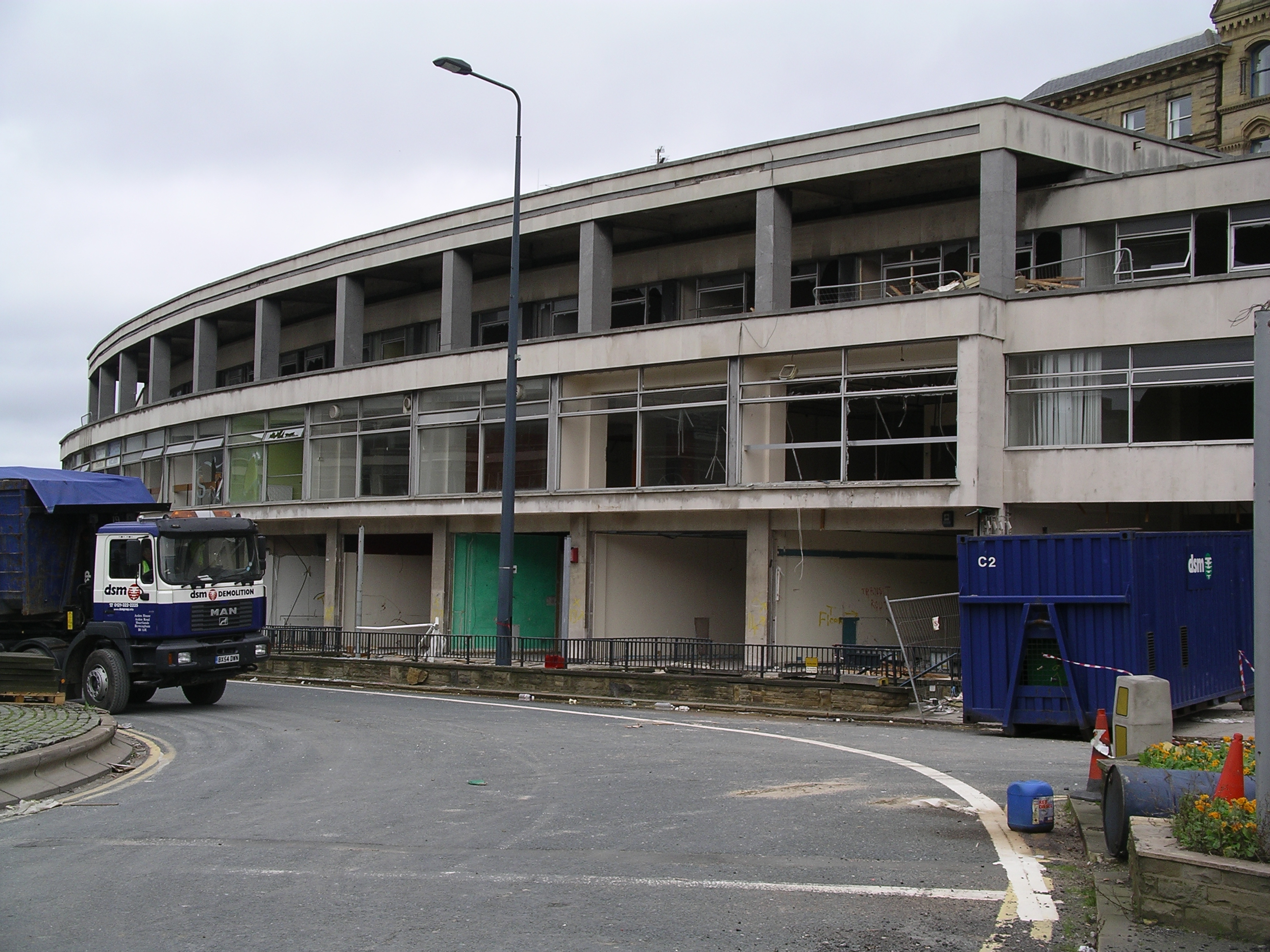
Forster Square demolition, November 2005

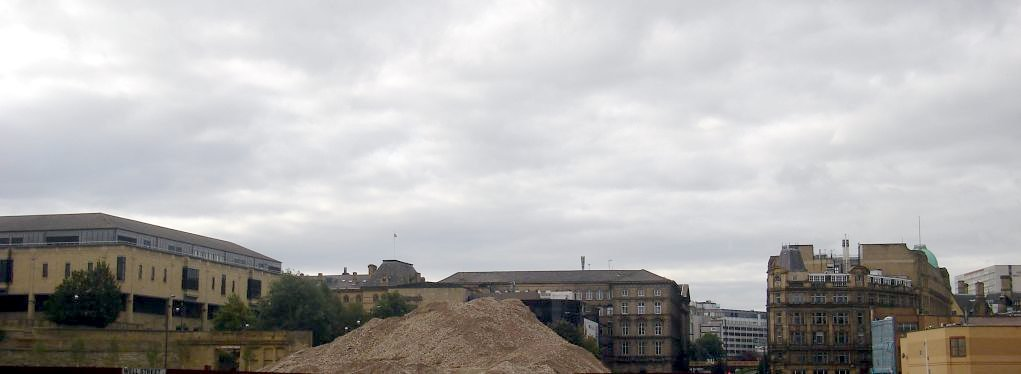
Forster Square post demolition, late 2006

In 1998 the Forster Square Development Partnership was established between Magellan Properties, Caddick Developments and the City of Bradford Metropolitan District Council. They planned a 51,096 m² (570,000 sq ft) shopping centre containing Primark, Next, River Island, and over 90 shops and other leisure facilities. (BHS had a store in Broadway, but it demolished as part of the demolition of the previous development on the site and C&A also had a store on the old Broadway but closed all UK stores in 2001 and thus cancelled plans to be part of this redevelopment). The partnership sold it to Stannifer which was bought out by the Westfield Group in December 2004.

Planning permission for the development was approved on 10 September 2003, with the claim that 3,000 new jobs could be created. Demolition on the Forster Square site started on 18 March 2004 and by mid-2006 the site was empty apart from a large pile of rubble. It was originally hoped that the complex would be open by late 2007 (with construction commencing in early 2006), but with a lack of anchor tenants and with many workmen still working on Westfield Derby, the start date for construction was pushed back. The delays led to Bradford Council threatening to take back control of the site from Westfield, if progress was not made.

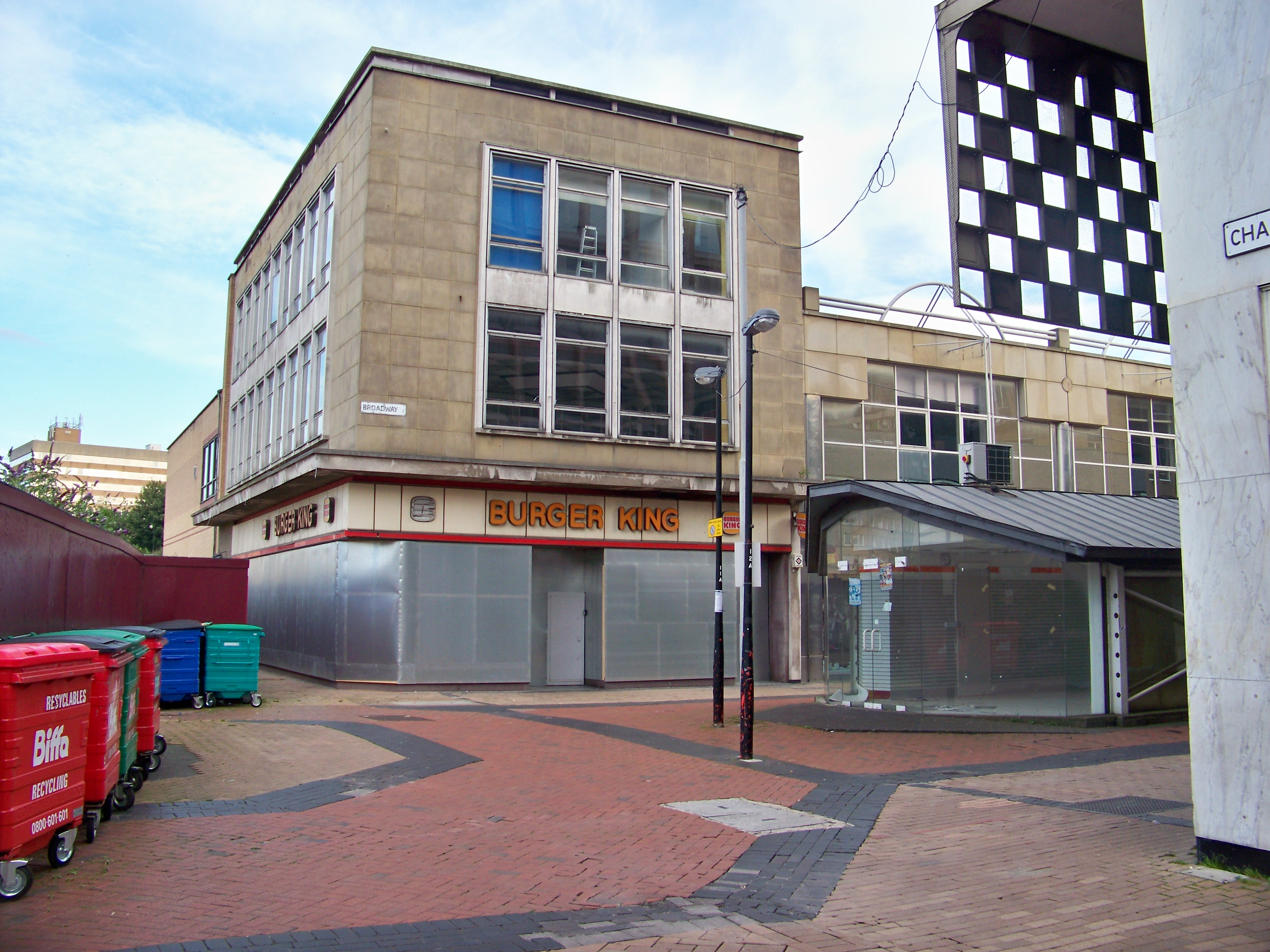
Boarded shops on Broadway on the fringes of the development; until the centre opened, shops in this area were somewhat isolated.

By 2006 demolition work had freed for development a site encompassed by Hall Ings, Well Street, the new Lower Kirkgate and Charles Street. In April 2010, after several years in which no construction had taken place, the project was mothballed and work began on creating a temporary park on part of the site. The site was subsequently occupied by protesters unhappy about the lack of development. In January 2014, the park was demolished, and work resumed on the construction.

The centre was opened at 10 am on 5 November 2015, by Alexandra Burke at the Forster Square entrance, and simultaneously at other entrances by representatives from Bradford City and the Bradford Burns Unit, and by the world's longest-married couple Karam and Kartari Chand.

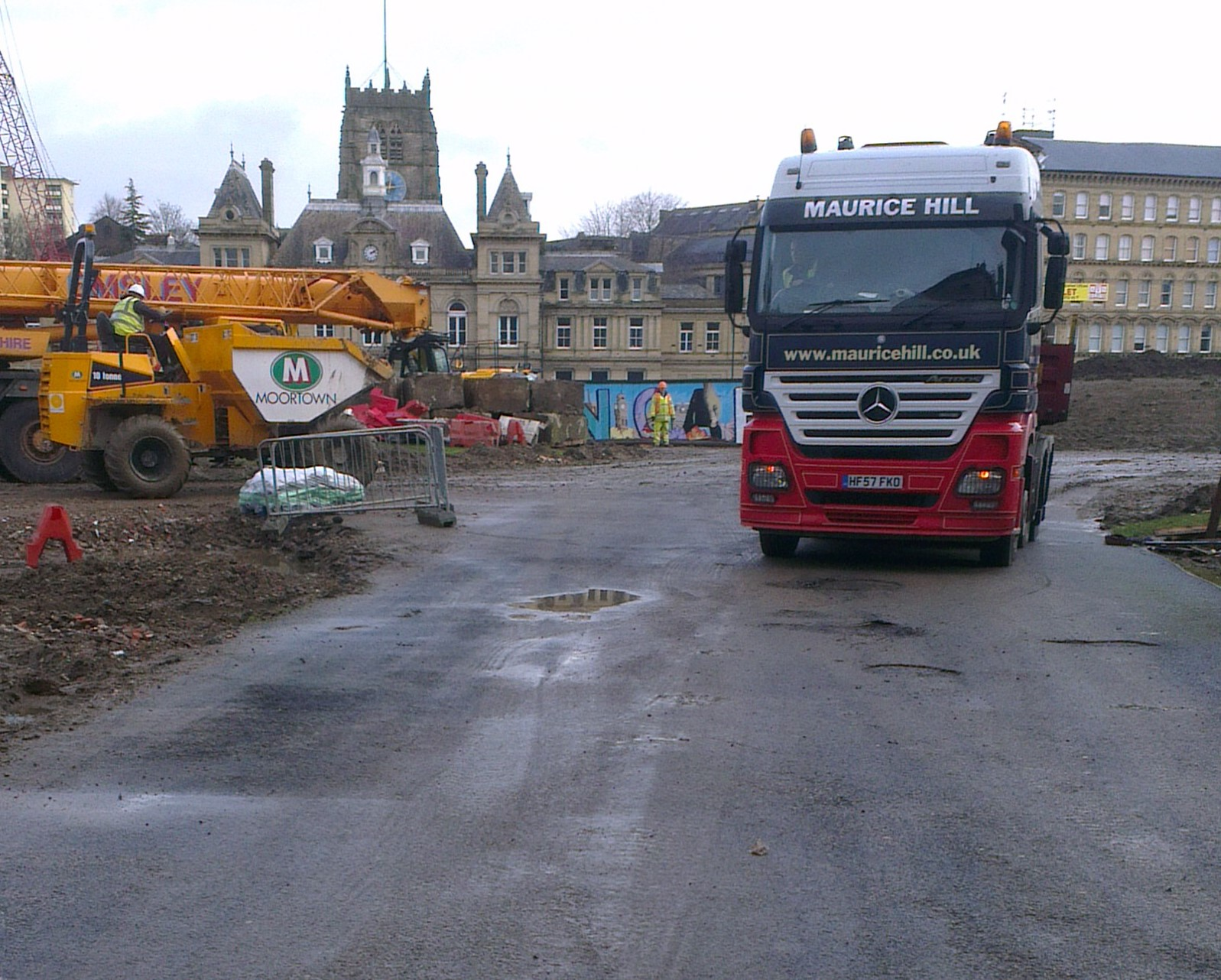
Building work began again in January 2014, beginning by demolishing the temporary urban park which had occupied part of the site since 2010.

In 2021 Debenhams closed following the firm's liquidation. The Marks and Spencer store closed on 18 May 2024.

Primark opened in the former Debenhams in September 2024, it relocated from the Kirkgate Shopping Centre.

In March 2026, NewRiver sold the centre to Eurofund Group for £70 million.

== Temporary urban park ==
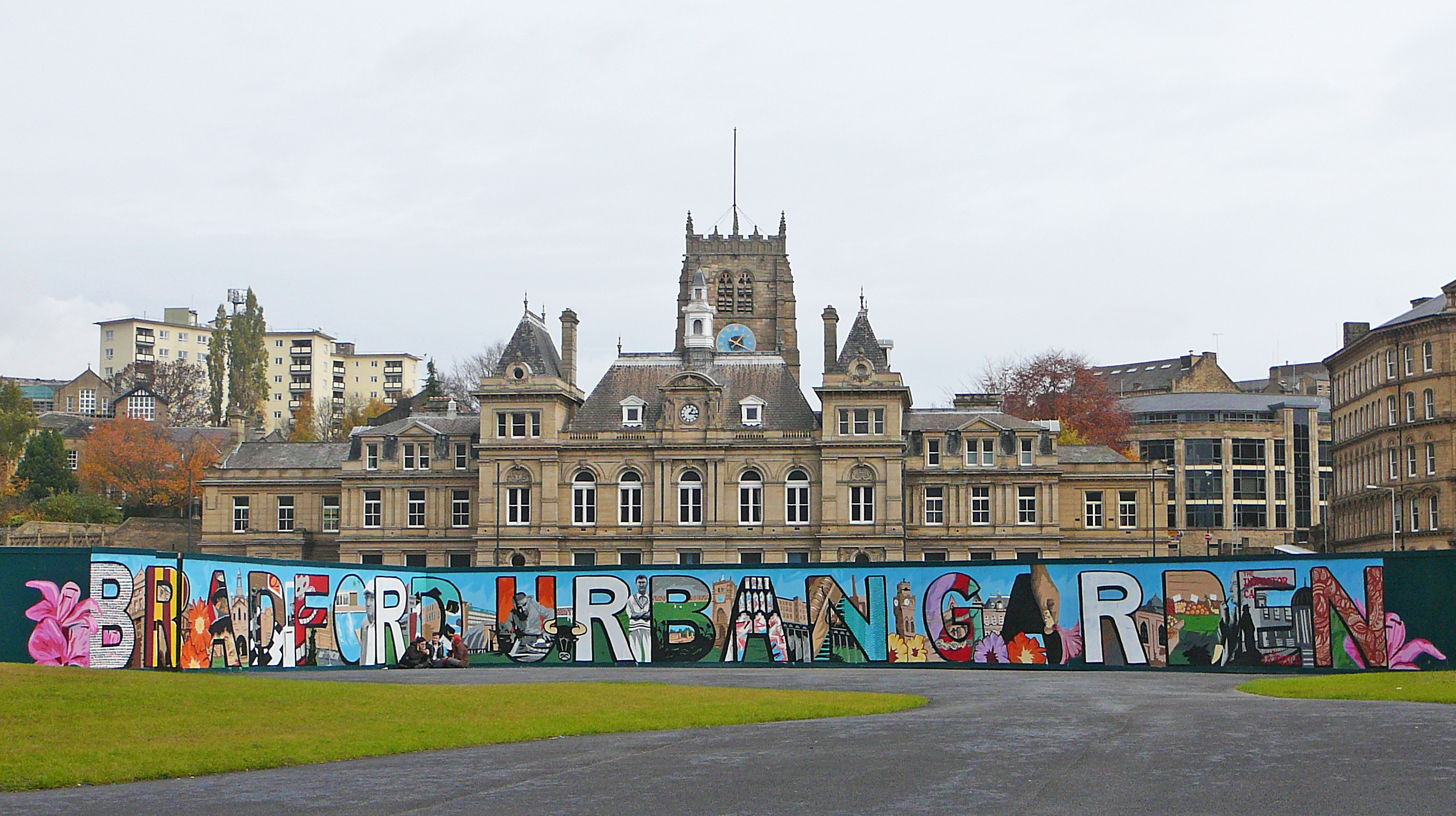
Mural at the temporary Urban Garden

In February 2010, almost 6 years after the start of demolition, Bradford Council announced a plan to convert part of the construction site into a temporary park. The park would include new footpaths, seating, grassed areas, urban allotments and a performance area The funding for the park scheme was provided partly by central government, as part of a fund to help local councils invest after recession, Yorkshire Forward, and the developers Westfield. Work began on the park in April 2010. The park was a temporary measure; and was closed on 6 January 2014 as construction of the development was about to begin.

== Timeline ==
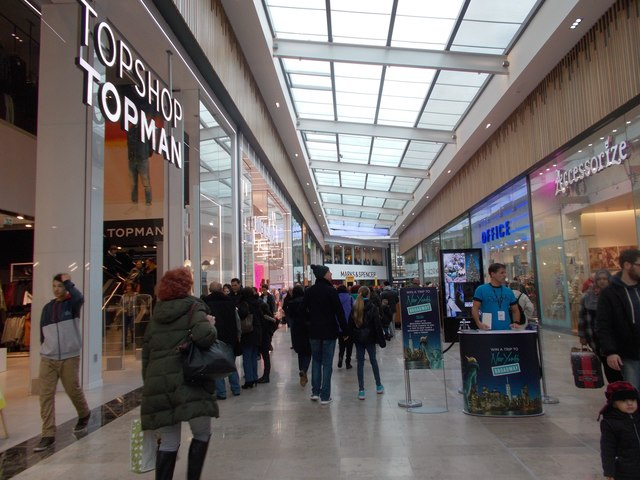
Interior of the shopping centre, November 2015

- 20 November 2007 – Westfield installed staff cabins and began preparatory work prior to beginning construction.
- Also in November 2007, Westfield applied to change the planning permission to include a hotel.
- August 2008 – No formal start date for construction yet announced, as Westfield are waiting for more 'anchor tenants' to sign up for shop space; currently half of the total shop space has been let. The developers have pledged to start work 'as soon as possible' and preparatory work on the site was due to be completed by mid-August 2008.
- January 2009 – site consists of excavated foundations but nobody is working on site and all staff entrances chained up.
- March 2009 – announced that work on the site is 'on hold' until 2010 due to the recession.
- 20 May 2009 – Bradford West Member of Parliament Marsha Singh raised the lack of progress on the site during Prime Minister's Questions in the House of Commons. Gordon Brown, the Prime Minister, stated that he would be willing to hold a meeting with Westfield to discuss the issue
- February 2010 – Bradford Council announced plan to convert part of the site into a temporary park
- April 2010 – Work started on the temporary park
- June 2011 – Westfield to submit new revised plans for a smaller centre containing 77 shops.
- October 2011 – Bradford Council pass revised planning application.
- July 2013 - Announcement made. Restarting construction in the second half of 2013
- January 2014 – The temporary garden closed to allow workers to start the project.
- May 2015: Westfield 75% of construction completed
- 5 November 2015 – Final touches and the Broadway Bradford opened its doors to the city centre with 73 shops to shop and explore

== Retailers ==
When opened, the shopping centre included Marks and Spencer and Debenhams as its anchor retailers. HMV, Next and H&M were also tenants at the opening of the cinema. Most retailers had relocated from more traditional parts of the city centre such as the Kirkgate Centre or Darley Street. There is also The Light Cinema, a food court and a multi-storey car park.
