= Voluntary death =

Voluntary death may refer to:

- Suicide, intentionally causing one's own death
- Voluntary euthanasia, ending a life painlessly
- Death by misadventure, death caused by a risk taken voluntarily
- Voluntary manslaughter, death caused in the heat of passion
