= Bradford City stadium fire =

1985 disaster in Valley Parade Stadium, Bradford, England

- Date: 11 May 1985
- Time: 3:44 p.m. (BST)
- Location: Valley Parade Bradford, West Yorkshire, England; 53°48′15″N 1°45′32″W
- Cause: Fan attempted to extinguish a lit cigarette, it slipped through floorboards and fell on rubbish, igniting it
- Deaths: 56
- Injuries: 265
- Inquiries: Popplewell Inquiry
- Coroner: James Turnbull

The Bradford City stadium fire occurred during a Football League Third Division match on Saturday 11 May 1985 at the Valley Parade stadium in Bradford, West Yorkshire, England, killing 56 spectators and injuring at least 265. The stadium was known for its antiquated design and facilities, which included the wooden roof of the main stand. Previous warnings had also been given about a major build-up of litter in the cavity below the stand. The stand had been officially condemned and was due to be replaced with a steel structure after the season ended.

The match between Bradford City and Lincoln City, the final game of the season, had started in a celebratory atmosphere with Bradford receiving the Third Division championship trophy. At 3:44 p.m., the television commentator John Helm remarked upon a small fire in the main stand; in less than four minutes, with the windy conditions, the fire had engulfed the whole stand. In the panic that ensued, fleeing crowds escaped on to the pitch but others at the back of the stand tried to break down locked exit doors to escape. Many were burnt to death at the turnstile gates, which had been locked after the match had begun. There were many cases of heroism, with more than 50 people later receiving police awards or commendations for bravery.

The disaster led to rigid new safety standards in UK stadiums, including the banning of new wooden grandstands. It was also a catalyst for the substantial redevelopment and modernisation of many British football grounds within the following thirty years. Bradford City continues to support the Bradford Burns Unit, at the University of Bradford, as its official charity.

== Background ==
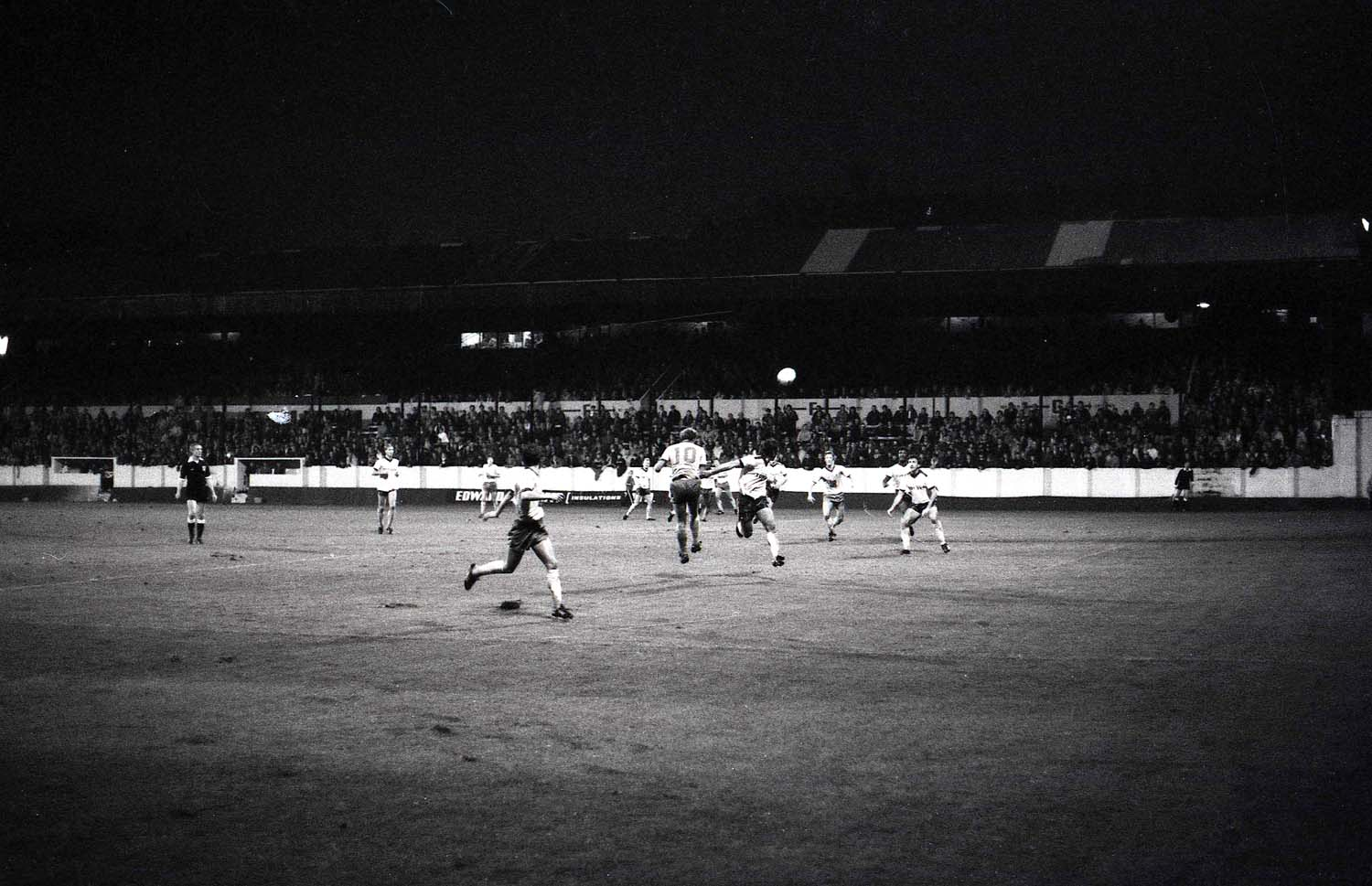
The Main Stand in 1982

Valley Parade in Bradford, West Yorkshire, was built in 1886 and was initially the home ground of Manningham Rugby Football Club. Since 1903, when the club was formed, Bradford City Association Football Club have played their home games at the ground. The playing area and stands were very basic but the ground had a capacity for 18,000 spectators. When the association football club was formed, the ground was changed very little and had no covered accommodation. However, when Bradford City won promotion to the highest level of English football, the First Division, in 1908, club officials sanctioned an upgrade programme. Football architect Archibald Leitch was commissioned to carry out the work. By 1911, his work was completed. It included a main stand which seated 5,300 fans, and had room for a further 7,000 standing spectators in the paddock in front. The main stand was described as a "mammoth structure", but was unusual for its time because of its place on the side of a hill. The entrances to the stand were all at the rear and were higher than the rest of the ground.

Although there had been some changes to other parts of the ground, the main stand remained unaltered by 1985. Football ground writer Simon Inglis had described the view from the stand as "like watching football from the cockpit of a Sopwith Camel" because of its antiquated supports and struts. However, he also warned the club of a build-up of litter that had fallen beneath the stand over the years through gaps in the wooden structure. Some repair work was carried out, but in July 1984 the club was warned again, this time by a county council engineer, who was involved because of the club's plans to claim for ground improvements from the Football Trust. One letter from the council said the problems "should be rectified as soon as possible"; a second said: "A carelessly discarded cigarette could give rise to a fire risk." In March 1985, the club's plans became more apparent when it took delivery of steel for a new roof.

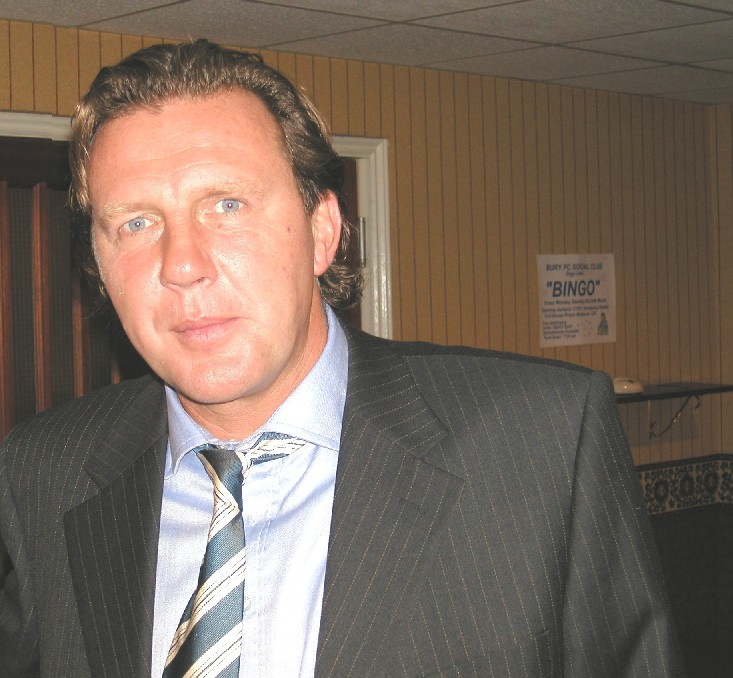
Peter Jackson was presented with the league trophy before the final game.

The 1984–85 season had been one of Bradford City's most successful seasons, ending with City clinching the championship title courtesy of a 2–0 victory against Bolton Wanderers in the penultimate game of the season. As a result, captain Peter Jackson was presented with the league trophy before the final game of the season with mid-table Lincoln City at Valley Parade on 11 May 1985. As it was the first piece of league silverware that the club had captured since they won the Third Division (North) title 56 years earlier, 11,076 supporters were in the ground. It was nearly double the season's average of 6,610 and included 3,000 fans in the ground's main stand. In the crowd were local dignitaries and guests from three of Bradford's twin towns: Verviers in Belgium, and Mönchengladbach and Hamm in West Germany.

Bradford's Telegraph & Argus newspaper published a souvenir issue for 11 May, entitled, "Spit and Polish for the Parade Ground". It detailed the safety work which would be carried out at Valley Parade as a result of the club's promotion, describing the ground as "inadequate in so many ways for modern requirements". Steel was to be installed in the roof, and the wooden terracing was to be replaced with concrete. The work was expected to cost £400,000 (£1.2 million in 2025).

== Fire ==
The match kicked off at 3:04 p.m. and after forty minutes of the first half the score remained 0–0, in what was described as a drab affair with neither team threatening to score.

At 3:44 p.m., five minutes before half-time, the first sign of a fire – a glowing light – was noticed three rows from the back of block G, as reported by the television commentator John Helm. Helm later described the start of the fire in an interview to the Daily Express newspaper:

[A] man over from Australia visiting his son got two tickets to the game. He lit a cigarette and when it was coming to an end he put it down on to the floorboard and tried to put his foot on it to put it out. It slipped through a hole in the floorboard. A minute later he saw a small plume of smoke so he poured his coffee on it and so did his son. It seemed to put it out. But a minute or so later there was suddenly a bigger whoosh of smoke so they went to get a steward. By the time they got back, the whole thing had taken off.

One witness saw paper or debris on fire, about nine inches (230 mm) below the floor boards. The stand seats did not have staircases; this had allowed a large accumulation of rubbish and paper waste in the cavity space under the stand. Spectators later spoke of initially feeling their feet becoming warmer; one of them ran to the back of the stand for a fire extinguisher but found none. A police officer shouted to a colleague for an extinguisher, but his call was misheard and instead the fire brigade were radioed. The call was timed at 3:43 p.m.

The fire escalated very rapidly, and flames became visible; police started to evacuate the stand. As the blaze spread, the wooden stands and roof – covered with layers of highly flammable bituminous roofing felt – quickly went ablaze. Burning timbers and molten materials fell from the roof onto the crowd and seating below, and dense black smoke enveloped a passageway behind the stand, where many spectators were trying to escape. One eyewitness, Geoffrey Mitchell, told the BBC: "It spread like a flash. I've never seen anything like it. The smoke was choking. You could hardly breathe." As spectators began to cascade over the wall separating the stand from the pitch, the linesman on that side of the pitch informed referee Norman Glover, who stopped the game with three minutes remaining before half-time. It took 270 seconds for the entire stand to burn down.

There were no extinguishers in the stand's passageway for fear of vandalism, and one spectator ran to the clubhouse to find one but was overcome by smoke and impeded by others trying to escape. Supporters ran either upwards to the back of the stand or downwards to the pitch to escape. The stand had no perimeter fencing to keep fans from accessing the pitch, thus averting an instance of crush asphyxia as in the 1989 Hillsborough disaster. Footage of the accident at this point shows levels of confusion among the spectators – while many were trying to escape or to cross the pitch to the relative safety of the neighbouring stands, other spectators were observed cheering or waving to the pitchside cameras.

Most of the exits at the back were locked or shut and there were no stewards present to open them, but seven were forced open or found open. Three men smashed down one door and at least one exit was opened by people outside, which again helped prevent further deaths. Mitchell said: "There was panic as fans stampeded to an exit which was padlocked. Two or three burly men put their weight against it and smashed the gate open. Otherwise, I would not have been able to get out." At the front of the stand, men threw children over the wall to help them escape. Most of those who escaped onto the pitch were saved.

People who had escaped the fire then tried to assist their fellow supporters. Police officers also assisted in the rescue attempts. One man clambered over burning seats to help a fan, as did player John Hawley, and one officer led fans to an exit, only to find it shut and had to turn around. Bradford City's coach Terry Yorath, whose family was in the stand, ran onto the pitch to help evacuate people. Another player went into the office space to ensure there was nobody there. One fan put his jumper over a fellow supporter's head to extinguish flames. Those who escaped were taken out of the ground to neighbouring homes and a pub, where a television screened World of Sport, which broadcast video recorded of the fire just an hour after it was filmed.

The fire brigade arrived at the ground four minutes after they were initially alerted. However, the fire had consumed the stand entirely by that point and they were faced with huge flames and very dense smoke. As many supporters still required rescue from the stand, they were unable to immediately start fighting the source of the fire.

The fire destroyed the main stand completely and left only burned seats, lamps and metal fences remaining. Some of those who died were still sitting upright in their seats, covered by remnants of tarpaulin that had fallen from the roof. Police worked until 4 am the next morning, under lighting, to remove all the bodies. Within a few hours of the blaze starting, it was established that 56 people had been killed, many as a result of smoke inhalation, although some of them had survived until reaching hospital.

=== Television broadcast ===
The match was recorded by Yorkshire Television for their regional edition of the ITV Sunday afternoon football show The Big Match. Uncensored coverage of the fire was transmitted minutes after the event on World of Sport and the BBC's Grandstand after the video cassette was physically driven to Yorkshire Television.

== Victims and injured ==
Of the 56 people who died in the fire, 54 were Bradford supporters and two supported Lincoln. They included three who tried to escape through the toilets, 27 who were found by exit K and turnstiles 6 to 9 at the rear centre of the stand, and two elderly people who had died in their seats. Some had been crushed as they tried to crawl under turnstiles to escape. One retired mill worker made his way to the pitch but was walking about on fire from head to foot. People smothered him to extinguish the flames, but he later died of his injuries in hospital. Of those who died, eleven were under 18 and 23 were aged 65 or over, and the oldest victim was the club's former chairman, Sam Firth, aged 86. More than 265 supporters were injured.

The fire was described as the worst fire disaster in the history of British football, and the worst football related disaster since 66 spectators died at Ibrox Park in 1971.

== Treatment of casualties and Burns Research Unit ==
The Bradford Burns Unit was set up by David Sharpe after he received many of the victims following the fire. As he received the injured at Bradford Royal Infirmary he was able to call upon 10% of the UK's population of plastic surgeons. It was during this treatment that Sharpe began to develop the Bradford Sling, which applies even pressure across sensitive areas. The sling is now used internationally in the treatment of burns.

Immediately after the fire, Sharpe planned and treated the injuries of over 200 individuals, with many experimental treatments being used. Matthew Wildman, aged 17 at the time of the fire, commented that "I must have had five different experiments carried out on me with all sorts of new techniques for skin grafts and I had potions injected into me that helped my face repair naturally over time."

On the 25th anniversary of the fire, the University of Bradford established the United Kingdom's largest academic research centre in skin sciences as an extension to its plastic surgery and burns research unit.

== Inquiry, inquest and legal action ==
=== Popplewell Inquiry ===
The inquiry into the disaster, chaired by Oliver Popplewell and known as the Popplewell Inquiry, led to the introduction of new legislation to improve safety at the UK's football grounds. Among the main outcomes of the inquiry were the banning of new wooden grandstands at all UK sports grounds, the immediate closure of other wooden stands deemed unsafe and the banning of smoking in other wooden stands.

At the time of the disaster, many stadiums had perimeter fencing between the stands and the pitch to prevent incidents of football hooliganism – particularly pitch invasions – which were rife during the 1980s. The main stand at Bradford was not surrounded by fencing, and therefore most of the spectators in it could escape onto the pitch. However, the turnstiles were locked and none of the stadium staff were present to unlock them, leaving no escape through the normal entrances and exits. Most of the fans who took this escape route were killed or seriously injured. Fans in the next stand (the "Bradford End") pulled down the fence separating them from the pitch.

The Popplewell Inquiry found that the club had been warned about the fire risk that the rubbish accumulating under the stand had posed. The stand had already been condemned, and the demolition teams were due to start work two days later. However, as there was no real precedent, most Bradfordians accepted that the fire was a terrible piece of misfortune. A discarded cigarette and a dilapidated wooden stand, which had survived because the club did not have the money to replace it, and accumulated paper litter, were considered to have conspired to cause the worst disaster in the history of the Football League at that time.

=== Inquest and legal test case ===
In July 1985, an inquest was held into the deaths; at the hearings the coroner James Turnbull recommended a death by misadventure outcome, with which the jury agreed. Following the hearing in 1986, a test case was brought in the High Court by David Britton, a police sergeant serving on the day, and by Susan Fletcher, who lost her husband John, 11-year-old son Andrew, John's brother Peter and his father Edmond in the fire. On 23 February 1987, the judge, Sir Joseph Cantley apportioned two thirds of the liability to the club, and the other one third to West Yorkshire Metropolitan County Council (which had been abolished in 1986). The Health and Safety Executive (the second of the three defendants) were found to be non-liable.

Explaining his decision, Cantley stated: "As I have already stated, the primary duty was on the Club and the functions of the County Council were supervisory and its liability is for negligent breach of a common law duty arising out of the way in which they dealt with or ignored their statutory powers. That duty was not a duty to the Club but a duty to the spectators and other persons in the stand. However, the responsibility of the Club is, in my view, very much the greater and I apportion responsibility between the two defendants as to two-thirds on the first defendant and one-third on the third defendant."

The county council was found to have failed in its duty under the Fire Precautions Act 1971. Criticising Bradford City during the case, Michael Ogden QC highlighted that the club "gave no or very little thought to fire precautions" despite repeated warnings.

The outcome of the test case resulted in over 154 claims being addressed (110 civilians and 44 police officers) by the injured or bereaved. Speaking at the close of the case, the Judge said "They (the club) were at fault, no one in authority seemed to have appreciated the fire hazard. No one gave it the attention it ought to have received. ... The fact is that no one person was concerned with the safety of the premises."

Central to the test case were two letters sent to Bradford City's club secretary by the West Yorkshire Fire Brigade; the second letter dated 18 July 1984 specifically highlighted in full the improvements needed to be actioned at the ground as well as the fire risk at the main stand. When cross examined by QC Robert Smith, chairman Stafford Heginbotham said he knew about the fire risk at the ground.

During the case, Cantley stated that: "It is only right that I should say that I think it would be unfair to conclude that Heginbotham, Tordoff, the Board of Directors, or any of them, were intentionally and callously indifferent to the safety of spectators using the stand. They were at fault, but the fault was that no-one in authority seems ever to have properly appreciated the real gravity of this fire hazard and consequently no-one gave it the attention it certainly ought to have received."

The total amount of compensation to the 154 claimants was reported to be as high as £20 million, with the payouts covered by insurance taken out by the club. In 1988, the first compensation payments were made to survivors of the fire, with over 40 people receiving up to £40,000 each. By this date the appeal fund set up for survivors had paid out more than £4m with further payouts expected as the effects of physical and mental injury were determined.

=== Comments by Martin Fletcher ===
In 2010, Susan Fletcher's son and survivor of the Bradford City fire (and witness to the Hillsborough disaster), Martin Fletcher, openly criticised the club's hierarchy at the time of the fire and the subsequent investigation. Fletcher said that "The club at the time took no actual responsibility for its actions and nobody has ever really been held accountable for the level of negligence which took place. It was appalling that public money was given to the club while it was still owned by the same shareholders under whose direction the fire had happened. I do not include the people currently running the club, who have always displayed a great, sensitive duty to the memory of those who died."

After controversial comments made by Popplewell about the Hillsborough disaster, Fletcher raised further concerns about the events following the fire saying that "I have many unanswered questions still about the fire in which four of my family died, as does my mother. Popplewell's report was nowhere close to the quality of Lord Justice Taylor's report after Hillsborough, and since reading it as an adult I have always been very disappointed in it and considered it a poor piece of work." Fletcher subsequently published a book in 2015, Fifty-Six: The Story of the Bradford Fire which revealed a history of fires at businesses owned by the Bradford City chairman Stafford Heginbotham. Eight fires in the 18 years before the Bradford City fire were identified, many catastrophic and leading to large insurance payouts.

== Reaction ==
The tragedy received immense media attention and drew support from around the world, with those offering their sympathy including Queen Elizabeth II, Prime Minister Margaret Thatcher and Pope John Paul II. Messages of condolence were also received from Helmut Kohl, Chedli Klibi and Felipe González.

The club's chairman, Stafford Heginbotham, said: "It was to be our day". Coach Terry Yorath described the events as "the worst day in my life." Police Superintendent Barry Osborne, divisional commander for the area, said many of his officers cried when they saw how badly people had been burned.

The disaster also had a long-lasting effect on the fans. Christopher Hammond, who was 12 on the day, said on the 20th anniversary of the fire: "As a 12-year-old, it was easy to move on – I didn't realise how serious it was until I looked at the press coverage over the next few days. But looking back and seeing how much it really affected my dad makes me realise what we went through." His father Tony went back the following day and said: "I wondered how anybody had got out alive, but I also began to feel guilty that I had got out when so many hadn't." He had to undergo counselling and was unable to go to another game for several years. Matthew Wildman was 17 at the time and needed crutches to walk because of rheumatoid arthritis. He was helped out of the stand by other fans and spent a period of time in hospital. He later said: "I have never known anything like it, either before, or since. Everybody in the city was devastated, but there was an amazing number of volunteers. [...] I still have terrible memories of the day, but it is the humanity of those that helped us that I reflect on."

== Aftermath ==
=== Appeal fund ===
The Bradford Disaster Appeal fund, set up within 48 hours of the disaster, eventually raised over £3.5 million (£10.8 million today). The fundraising events included a reunion of the 1966 World Cup final Starting XI that began with the original starting teams of both England and West Germany, and was held at Leeds United's Elland Road stadium in July 1985 to raise funds for the Appeal fund. England won the re-match 6–4.

Part of the Appeal funds were raised by a recording of "You'll Never Walk Alone" from Rodgers and Hammerstein's musical Carousel by The Crowd (including Gerry Marsden of Gerry and the Pacemakers, who had recorded the 1963 version that led to Liverpool adopting it as their motto and team song), which reached number one in the UK Singles chart. The money raised from this record was contributed to fund the internationally renowned burns unit that was established in partnership between the University of Bradford and Bradford Royal Infirmary, immediately after the fire, which has also been Bradford City's official charity for many years.

For the 30th anniversary of the fire a new version of "You'll Never Walk Alone" was recorded at Voltage Studios in Bradford. On the recording are Dene Michael (Black Lace), The Chuckle Brothers, Clive Jackson of Dr & The Medics, Owen Paul, Billy Pearce, Billy Shears, Flint Bedrock, and Rick Wild of The Overlanders. It was the brainchild of Bradford City fan Lloyd Spencer with all profits going to the Bradford Royal Infirmary Burns Unit.

=== Memorial service and memorials ===
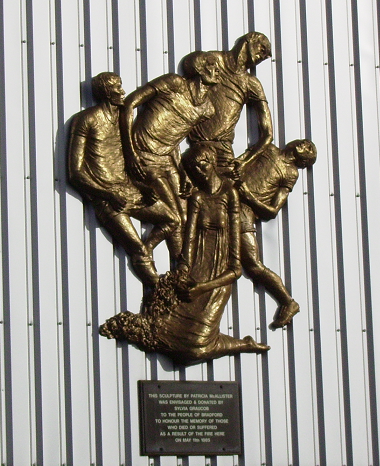
A memorial, erected on the main stand of Valley Parade, to the victims of the fire

A capacity 6,000 crowd attended a multi-denominational memorial service, held on the pitch in the sunny shadow of the burnt out stand at Valley Parade in July 1985. A giant Christian cross, made up of two large charred wooden members that had once been part of the stand, was constructed in front of the middle of the stand and behind the pitchside speaker's platform. Part of the service was also held in Urdu and Punjabi as a sign of appreciation to the local Pakistani community in Manningham, Bradford and around Valley Parade who had opened their homes to Bradford City supporters to provide assistance in the immediate aftermath of the disaster. The next day work began on clearing the burnt out shell of the stand, and Justice Popplewell released his findings into the disaster.

Bradford City initially prospered in the Second Division – only missing out on promotion to the First Division in 1988 after failing to beat Ipswich Town at home on the final day of their first full season back at Valley Parade.

At Valley Parade there are now two memorials. One, now re-situated to that end of the stand where the fire began, is a sculpture donated on the initial re-opening of Valley Parade in December 1986 by Sylvia Graucob, a then Jersey-based former West Yorkshire woman. The other, situated by the main entrance, was donated by the club after its £7.5 million (£13.9 million today) rebuilding of the original main stand in 2002. It has a black marble fascia on which the names and ages of those that died are inscribed in gold, and a black marble platform on which people can leave flowers and mementos. There is a twin memorial sculpture, unveiled on 11 May 1986, which has the names of the dead inscribed on it. They were donated by Bradford's twin city of Hamm, Germany, and are situated in front of Bradford City Hall in both locations.

After the fire, Bradford City also announced they would thereafter play with a black trim on their shirt sleeves as a permanent memorial to those who had died.

=== Commendations ===
Four police officers, constables David Britton and John Richard Ingham and chief inspectors Charles Frederick Mawson and Terence Michael Slocombe, and two spectators, Richard Gough and David Hustler, were awarded the Queen's Gallantry Medal for their actions. PCs Peter Donald Barrett and David Charles Midgley, along with spectators Michael William Bland and Timothy Peter Leigh received the Queen's Commendation for Brave Conduct. In total, 28 police officers and 22 supporters, who were publicly documented as having saved at least one life, later received police commendations or bravery awards. Together, flanked by undocumented supporters, they managed to clear all but one person who made it to the front of the stand. Club coach Terry Yorath incurred minor injuries while taking part in the rescue.

=== Redevelopment of Valley Parade grounds ===
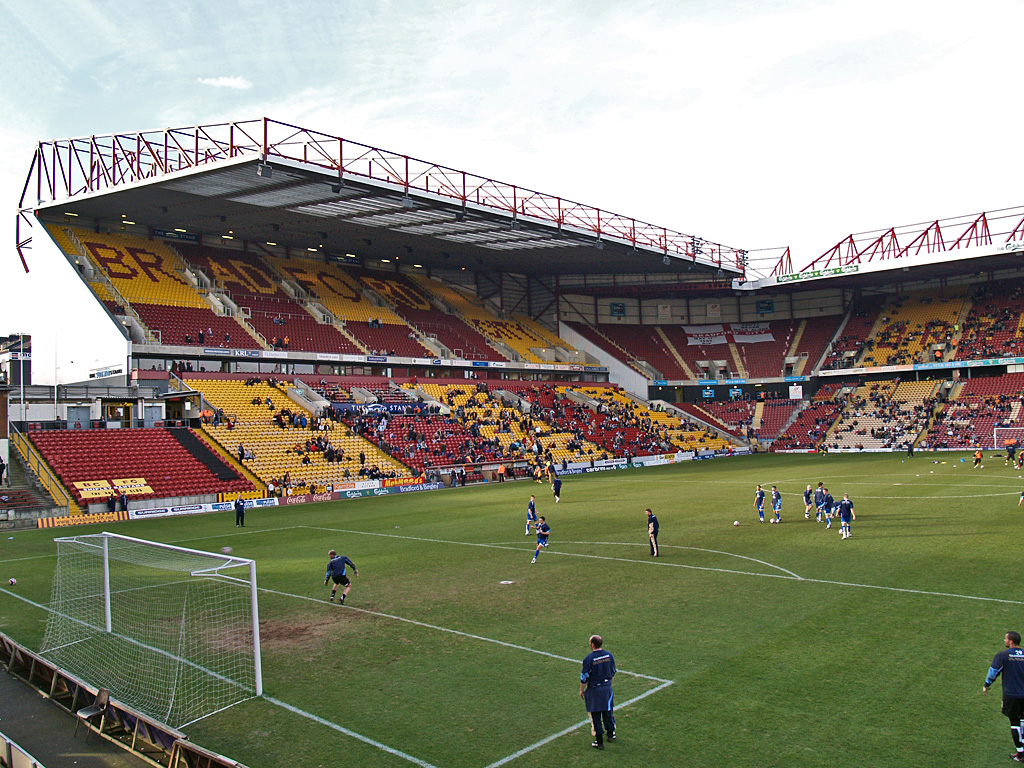
The main stand following further redevelopment in 2001

While Valley Parade was re-developed, Bradford City played games at various neighbouring grounds: Elland Road, Leeds; Leeds Road, Huddersfield; and Odsal Stadium, Bradford. Valley Parade re-opened on 14 December 1986, when Bradford City beat an England XI 2–1 in a friendly. Since then, it has been further re-developed and, today, Valley Parade is a modern 25,136 all-seater stadium, which is virtually unrecognisable from how it was at the time of the disaster, save for the original clubhouse that still stands beside the main stand, and the flank support wall that runs down the Hollywell Ash Lane at the "Bradford End".

=== Effect on Lincoln City ===
Lincoln City suffered two successive relegations, first to the Fourth Division in 1986, and again in 1987, becoming the first team to be automatically relegated from the Football League itself. They were immediately promoted back to the Football League in 1988, and survived for 23 years before being relegated again in 2011. Although some attributed Lincoln City's sudden demise to the psychological effects of the fire on its players (together with the resignation of successful manager Colin Murphy shortly before the fire), it symbolised the wider crisis that the introduction of new safety legislation brought to Lincoln's Sincil Bank home.

The timber construction of St. Andrew's Stand, Main Stand and the roof of its popular Railway End terrace were immediately condemned as fire hazards, which saw seating capacity briefly cut to nil. Lincoln City's board responded by committing £1.1 million (£3.4 million today) to their ground's renovation in the year that immediately followed the fire at Valley Parade, and over the following decade made improvements that eventually totalled £3 million. After its renovation in 1990 they named the home end of their ground the "Stacey-West Stand" in honour of Bill Stacey and Jim West, the two Lincoln City supporters who died in the fire. Each year Lincoln send representatives to the annual memorial service in Bradford city centre and between 2007 and 2009 were managed by Bradford's captain that day, Peter Jackson.

The two sides met for the first time after the fire in April 1989, when they arranged a benefit match in aid of the Hillsborough disaster, at Valley Parade.

== Dramatisations, documentaries and published works ==
In 1986, a year after the disaster, Yorkshire Television aired a documentary presented by John Helm entitled Bradford City – A Year of Healing. The documentary highlighted the "poison pen letters" and graffiti targeted at the then club chairman Stafford Heginbotham over accusations that he was in some way personally responsible for the deaths of the 56 people who died at the fire.

Parrs Wood Press published Four Minutes to Hell: The Story of the Bradford City Fire (2005) by author Paul Firth; the title refers to the estimated time it took for the stand to be completely ablaze from the first flames being spotted. Another book; 56: The Story of the Bradford Fire (2015) was written by Martin Fletcher to discuss how the disaster was caused, and follows his loss of his father, brother, uncle and grandfather.

On 1 May 2010, to commemorate the 25th anniversary of the fire the BBC football television show Football Focus was hosted from Valley Parade by Dan Walker, the show included interviews with Terry Yorath and John Hendrie.

In 2014, the theatre company Funny You Should Ask (FYSA) premiered their tribute to the 56 people who died at the fire. Entitled The 56, the play dramatises actual accounts of the Bradford City fire with the purpose of the play showing how in times of adversity, the football club and the local community came together. Scriptwriters of the play spent hours with the survivors and victims' families. Profits from the play's run at The Edinburgh Fringe were donated to the Bradford Burns Unit.

In May 2025, the 40th anniversary of the incident, a documentary called Unforgotten: The Bradford City Fire was released by the BBC.

== Calls for a new inquiry ==
Following his own 15-year investigation into the fire, which killed four of his family members while he escaped, former tax accountant Martin Fletcher released 56: The Story of the Bradford Fire (2015). Nigel Adams – who worked for 12 years as a fire investigator with a British fire service – was spurred on by the book to join the call for a fresh inquiry, stating that Fletcher's book was "one of the best accounts of a fire, as seen from a victim's point of view, and as a piece of investigative writing, I have ever read". He agreed that the inquiry into Bradford, led by the judge Oliver Popplewell, was inadequate and that "there are many unanswered questions". He went on to state:

"In 1985 fire investigation in Britain was in its infancy and some would say at that time most fire investigators were not much more than dust-kickers. Like all areas of forensic investigations, it has come on leaps and bounds. However, there is a lot in this book that troubles me about the science, or lack of it, used in the testing of the investigators' hypothesis as to the source of the ignition. The book also raises concerns about the speed of the inquiry and the fact that it commenced a few weeks after the fire and lasted for only a few days, whereas other inquiries into similar incidents, pre and post the Bradford fire, have taken years to come to fruition and months to be heard. The fact the inquiry also embraced the investigation into another incident which happened on the same day, a riot in which a young boy died at Birmingham City, makes it seem more frivolous."

Adams also went on to state that "I have read in some newspapers that he is being berated for his campaign to have a new inquiry. I don't see that. There is no malicious vendetta, there is no over-exaggeration, there are no trumped-up facts. It is a simple account laid out for all to see. Fletcher has taken facts and presented them in such a way that it should make it moralistically impossible for this incident not to be looked at again."

On 26 January 2016, the Independent Police Complaints Commission declined calls for an investigation and published its full response online.

== Eric Bennett controversy ==
On 17 April 2015, retired Detective Inspector Raymond Falconer, in a report by the Bradford Telegraph and Argus, said the police were aware of an Australian man who admitted to starting the fire. Following the 30th anniversary of the fire, a number of news organisations named this man as Eric Bennett, who was visiting his nephew in Bradford from Australia and attended the game on the day. Following this report, Leslie Brownlie, who was the nephew in question, is reported to have said that his uncle never made such an admission of starting the fire. He is quoted as saying: "I don't believe the statement of retired Detective Inspector Raymond Falconer at all. I don't know where Falconer is getting this cock-and-bull story from… the inaccuracies in this report [documentary] are dumbfounding."

Raymond Falconer's reliability had previously been questioned by Daniel Taylor in The Guardian, who stated that: "The Bradford Telegraph and Argus described him as a 'top detective'. He was actually one of the detectives involved in one of the gravest miscarriages of justice in the country, the murder of Carol Wilkinson in Bradford, where someone was locked up for 20 years for a murder he didn't commit."

== See also ==
- 1985 in association football
- List of accidents and disasters by death toll
- List of United Kingdom disasters by death toll

== Bibliography ==
- Frost, Terry (1988). Bradford City A Complete Record 1903–1988. Breedon Books Sport. ISBN 0-907969-38-0.
- Inglis, Simon (1987). The football grounds of Great Britain. Willow Books. ISBN 0-00-218249-1.
