= David Shaw (cricketer) =

English cricketer

Personal information
- Full name: David Andrew Shaw
- Born: 10 February 1967 (age 59); Maidenhead, Berkshire, England
- Batting: Right-handed
- Bowling: Right-arm medium

Domestic team information
- Years: Team
- 1990–1996: Berkshire

Career statistics
Competition	LA
Matches	4
Runs scored	107
Batting average	34.33
100s/50s	–/1
Top score	57
Balls bowled	26
Wickets	–
Bowling average	–
5 wickets in innings	–
10 wickets in match	–
Best bowling	–
Catches/stumpings	–/–
- Source: Cricinfo, 20 September 2010

David Andrew Shaw (born 10 February 1967) is a former English cricketer. Shaw was a right-handed batsman who bowled right-arm medium pace. He was born at Maidenhead, Berkshire.

Shaw made his Minor Counties Championship debut for Berkshire in 1990 against Cheshire. From 1990 to 1995, he represented the county in 33 Minor Counties Championship matches, the last of which came in the 1995 Championship when Berkshire played Dorset. Shaw also played in the MCCA Knockout Trophy for Berkshire. His debut in that competition came in 1991 when Berkshire played Hertfordshire. From 1991 to 1996, he represented the county in 6 Trophy matches, the last of which came when Berkshire played Shropshire in the 1996 MCCA Knockout Trophy.

Additionally, he also played List-A matches for Berkshire. His List-A debut for the county came against Middlesex in the 1990 NatWest Trophy. From 1990 to 1995, he represented the county in 4 List-A matches, with his final match coming when Berkshire played Surrey in the 1995 NatWest Trophy at The Oval in London. In his 4 matches, he took scored 103 runs at a batting average of 34.33, with a single half century score of 57.
