= Neil Priestley =

English cricketer (born 1961)

Personal information
- Full name: Neil Priestley
- Born: 23 June 1961 (age 65); Blyborough, Lincolnshire, England
- Batting: Left-handed
- Role: Wicket-keeper
- Relatives: Jess Priestley

Domestic team information
- Years: Team
- 1986–1989: Minor Counties
- 1983–1990: Lincolnshire
- 1981: Northamptonshire

Career statistics
| Competition | First-class | List A |
|---|---|---|
| Matches | 1 | 8 |
| Runs scored | 20 | 173 |
| Batting average | – | 21.62 |
| 100s/50s | –/– | –/1 |
| Top score | 20* | 54 |
| Balls bowled | – | – |
| Wickets | – | – |
| Bowling average | – | – |
| 5 wickets in innings | – | – |
| 10 wickets in match | – | – |
| Best bowling | – | – |
| Catches/stumpings | 1/2 | 4/3 |
- Source: Cricinfo, 12 July 2011

Neil Priestley (born 23 June 1961) is a former English cricketer. Priestley was a left-handed batsman who fielded as a wicket-keeper. He was born in Blyborough, Lincolnshire.

== Early life ==
From the John Leggott College in August 1979 he gained A-levels in economics, statistics, and pure mathematics. His family lived in Epworth, Lincolnshire in the 1980s.

== Career ==
Priestley made a single first-class appearance for Northamptonshire against the touring Sri Lankans in 1981. He batted once in this match, scoring 20 not out in Northamptonshire's first-innings, while behind the stumps he took a single catches and made 2 stumpings. He made no further appearances for Northamptonshire.

He later made his debut for Lincolnshire in the 1983 Minor Counties Championship against Hertfordshire. He played Minor counties cricket for Lincolnshire from 1983 to 1990, which included 57 Minor Counties Championship appearances and 13 MCCA Knockout Trophy matches. He made his List A debut against Surrey in the 1983 NatWest Trophy. He made a further List A appearance for Lincolnshire, against Gloucestershire in the 1990 NatWest Trophy. In his 2 List A matches for the county, he scored 78 runs at an average of 39.00, with a high score of 54. This score, which would be his only List A fifty, came in the match against Gloucestershire.

It was however for the Minor Counties cricket team that Priestley made the majority of his List A appearances for, debuting for the team in the 1986 Benson & Hedges Cup against Northamptonshire. He made 5 further appearances for the team, the last of which came against Somerset in the 1989 Benson & Hedges Cup. In these 6 List A matches, he scored 95 runs at an average of 15.83, with a high score of 37. Behind the stumps he took 4 catches and made 2 stumpings.

Neil Played club cricket for Scunthorpe Town cricket club for several years, making his debut for their premier league 1st XI side in 1979. In 1980 the family made local headlines when Scunthorpe Town became the first county league side to play 4 members of the same family in a game. Neil played alongside father Geoff, and his two brothers Mark (Born 1959) and David (Born 1964). His brothers both went on to both have trials at Somerset, organised by Ian Botham, who lived at Epworth at the time and was a friend of the family.
