= David Blank =

English cricketer (born 1959)

Personal information
- Full name: David Clifford Blank
- Born: 19 December 1959 (age 66); Stoke-on-Trent, Staffordshire, England
- Batting: Right-handed
- Bowling: Right-arm fast-medium

Domestic team information
- Years: Team
- 1981–1991: Staffordshire

Career statistics
Competition	List A
Matches	7
Runs scored	60
Batting average	20.00
100s/50s	–/–
Top score	23*
Balls bowled	468
Wickets	9
Bowling average	38.55
5 wickets in innings	–
10 wickets in match	–
Best bowling	3/75
Catches/stumpings	–/–
- Source: Cricinfo, 13 June 2011

David Clifford Blank (born 19 December 1959) is a former English cricketer. Blank was a right-handed batsman who bowled right-arm fast-medium. He was born in Stoke-on-Trent, Staffordshire.

Blank made his debut for Staffordshire in the 1981 Minor Counties Championship against Cheshire. Blank played Minor counties cricket for Staffordshire from 1981 to 1991, which included 76 Minor Counties Championship matches and 20 MCCA Knockout Trophy matches. In 1984, he made his List A debut against Gloucestershire in the NatWest Trophy. He made 6 further appearances in List A cricket, the last coming against Northamptonshire in the 1990 NatWest Trophy. In his 7 List A matches, he scored 60 runs at an average of 20.00, with a high score of 23*. With the ball, he took 9 wickets at a bowling average of 38.55, with best figures of 3/75.
