= Harry Kelleher =

English cricketer (1929–2025)

Personal information
- Full name: Henry Robert Albert Kelleher
- Born: 3 March 1929; Bermondsey, London, England
- Died: 18 May 2025 (aged 96); Massillon, Ohio, U.S.
- Batting: Left-handed
- Bowling: Righft-arm fast-medium
- Role: Bowler
- Relatives: Danny Kelleher (nephew)

Domestic team information
- Years: Team
- 1955: Surrey
- 1956–1958: Northamptonshire
- FC debut: 29 June 1955 Surrey v Worcestershire
- Last FC: 30 May 1958 Northamptonshire v Warwickshire

Career statistics
Competition	First-class
Matches	55
Runs scored	256
Batting average	7.52
100s/50s	0/0
Top score	25
Balls bowled	6,064
Wickets	112
Bowling average	27.65
5 wickets in innings	4
10 wickets in match	1
Best bowling	5/23
Catches/stumpings	45/–
- Source: CricketArchive, 8 October 2010

Henry Robert Albert Kelleher (3 March 1929 – 18 May 2025) was an English first-class cricketer who played for Surrey and Northamptonshire between 1955 and 1958.

== Career ==
Kelleher was a right-arm fast-medium bowler with a whippy bowling action and a tail-end left-handed batsman. Having played for the second team since 1952 in the Minor Counties, he made a sensational first-class debut for Surrey at the age of 26 in 1955, taking five Worcestershire wickets for 23 runs in the first innings of the match at The Oval and following that up with five for 50 in the second innings for match figures of 10–73. Wisden Cricketers' Almanack noted that he "made fast-medium deliveries lift on drying turf". He never surpassed either the first innings figures or the match figures. But in the strong Surrey side of the 1950s, Kelleher was unable to retain his place and at the end of the 1955 season he left the county and joined Northamptonshire under special registration.

Kelleher immediately went into the Northamptonshire first team and retained his place across the damp summer of 1956, often opening the bowling with the England fast bowler Frank Tyson. Wisden noted that he "did well in a year when pitches were not in the main suited to his medium-fast bowling". In all matches, he took 55 wickets at an average of 28.38. As with his Surrey career, his best day was his first one: in the opening match of the season against Nottinghamshire he took five wickets for 85 (and Tyson took four for 59) in Nottinghamshire's first innings, and these would be the best innings figures of his Northamptonshire career.

The 1957 season, when Northamptonshire finished as runners-up to Surrey in the County Championship, was the most successful in the county's history, but most of the bowling success was down to Tyson, who took 100 wickets in a season for the first time, and the three slow bowlers, George Tribe, Jack Manning and Michael Allen, who took 305 Championship wickets between them. Kelleher took just 44 wickets in 22 matches and his bowling average, 26.90, contrasted with the county's other bowlers, all of whom averaged less than 20 runs per wicket. In 1958, he played in three early matches, but took only one wicket, and lost his place in the attack to Albert Lightfoot, who supplemented his occasional bowling with useful batting, a skill Kelleher never aspired to. He left Northamptonshire at the end of the 1958 season.

After leaving first class cricket, Kelleher played for many years in league cricket, including a long spell as professional for Old Hill Cricket Club in the Birmingham League.

== Personal life and death ==
Kelleher was born in Bermondsey, London. He was the uncle of the former Kent cricketer Danny Kelleher.

Following the death of Peter Arnold in 2021, Kelleher became the oldest living former Northamptonshire cricketer.

Kelleher died in Ohio, where he had moved after retirement, on 18 May 2025. He was 96.
