= Kristian Digby =

English television presenter and director

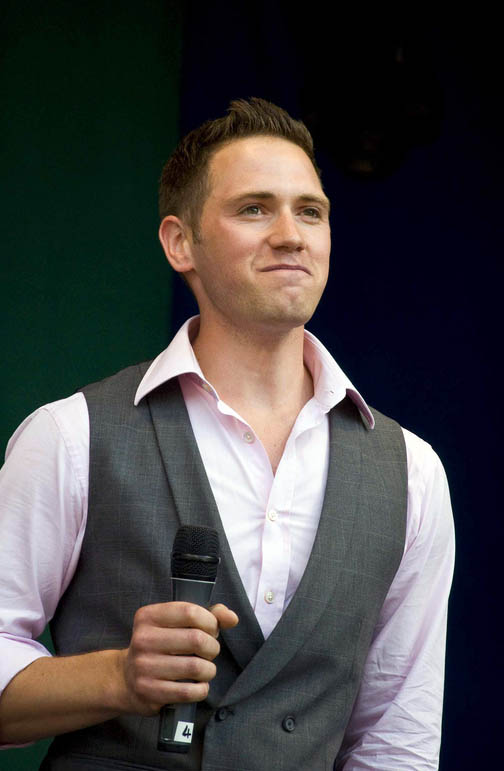
- Digby in 2009
- Born: Scott Kristian Edwin Digby; 24 June 1977; Torquay, Devon, England
- Died: 1 March 2010 (aged 32); Stratford, London, England
- Occupations: Television presenter and director
- Years active: 1998–2010
- Parent(s): David Digby; Paula Dubois

Scott Kristian Edwin Digby (24 June 1977 – 1 March 2010) was an English television presenter and director best known for presenting To Buy or Not to Buy on BBC One.

== Early life ==
Digby was born in Torquay, Devon to parents who were property developers. He attended Bramdean School in Exeter, where he battled with severe dyslexia, and graduated from the University of Westminster with a 2:1 in film and photography. He later presented a documentary for the BBC entitled Hiding the Truth: I Can't Read in which he returned to the school. In 1997, Digby's film Words of Deception won him a Junior BAFTA. The following year, his film Last Train to Demise, which featured actress and model Lucy Perkins, won the Melbourne Film Festival's Best Student Film award.

== Television career ==
Digby began his television presenting career for ITV presenting Nightlife. Prior to this he covered for LBC's TV critic Chris Stacey on LBC's evening shows, Sunday Night and One Night Strand. At around the same time, he directed television programmes Homefront, Fantasy Rooms, She's Got Have It which also featured actress and model Lucy Perkins, Girls on Top (Not be confused with the 1980s sitcom) and The O-Zone. In 2001, Digby presented That Gay Show on BBC Choice.

Beginning in 2003, Digby presented various programmes for the BBC, including To Buy or Not to Buy. In addition, he has presented Uncharted Territory, Holiday, Trading Up, Living in the Sun, House Swap, and Open House. In the September 2006 edition of AXM he appeared nude in front of kids for charity.

Digby was a presenter of morning TV BBC shows:

- Open House – Along with his team, he made over properties that are not selling through the traditional estate agent route, after the make over they host an open house for possible buyers.
- Buy It, Sell It, Bank It – The show follows two property developers at a property auction, the winner is followed for the rest of the show as he or she alters the house. The loser at the auction gives his or her thoughts of the improvements at the end of the show.
- To Build or Not to Build – In 2008 Digby decided to build his own house, designed by Neu Architects. The BBC decided to follow this and also draw in other people who have done something similar with Digby interviewing them. The premise is similar to Channel 4's Grand Designs, but on a smaller scale.

== Directing ==
In 1997 Digby's film Words of Deception won a junior Bafta and in 1998 his short film Last Train to Demise won Best Student Film at the Melbourne Film Festival.

== Charity work ==
Digby devoted a considerable amount of time to charity work. Two charities he was involved with were The Albert Kennedy Trust, which supports homeless LGBT people and the Terrence Higgins Trust which supports people living with HIV and AIDS.

== Personal life ==
Digby was openly gay. He discovered his sexuality when he was studying for his degree in "Film, video and photographic arts" at the University of Westminster (1995 to 1998).

In 2006, he appeared in Simon Fanshawe's The Trouble with Gay Men and bemoaned the lack of gay role models, stating that he refused to behave in a camp manner on TV, although he was known for his pole dancing skills exhibited on That Gay Show.

== Death ==
Digby's partner, Jason Englebrecht, returned from Africa on 28 February 2010, and tried to call Digby, but was unsuccessful in making contact or entering his home in Newham, London. On the morning of 1 March, Englebrecht called Digby's neighbour (and tenant) who entered the two-bedroom house that Digby had built and lived in. She found Digby dead on his bed at 7:45 am on 1 March 2010. An ambulance was called; paramedics declared him dead at the scene. Digby's body was identified by his mother, Paula Dubois. Digby's post-mortem examination was held on 2 March 2010; the results were inconclusive. The police were satisfied that there was no third-party involvement and the press reported his death was caused by auto-erotic asphyxiation.

An inquest opened on 4 March 2010 at Walthamstow Coroner's Court; both his parents attended. On 9 November 2010, the coroner recorded a verdict of death by misadventure.
