= Jamie Sykes =

English cricketer

Personal information
- Full name: James Frederick Sykes
- Born: 30 December 1965 (age 60); Shoreditch, London, England
- Height: 6 ft 2 in (1.88 m)
- Batting: Right-handed
- Bowling: Right-arm off break

Domestic team information
- Years: Team
- 1990: Durham
- 1983–1989: Middlesex

Career statistics
Competition	First-class	List A
Matches	30	38
Runs scored	696	390
Batting average	22.45	19.50
100s/50s	1/3	–/1
Top score	126	57
Balls bowled	2,378	919
Wickets	30	26
Bowling average	38.56	26.34
5 wickets in innings	–	–
10 wickets in match	–	–
Best bowling	4/49	3/26
Catches/stumpings	11/–	8/–
- Source: Cricinfo, 15 November 2011

James Frederick Sykes (born 30 December 1965) is a former English cricketer. Sykes was a right-handed batsman who bowled right-arm off break. He was born at Shoreditch, London and educated at Bow Comprehensive.

Sykes made his first-class debut for Middlesex against Lancashire in the 1983 County Championship. Between then and his next appearance for Middlesex, Sykes played Youth Test cricket for England Young Cricketers against the West Indies Young Cricketers, making three Test appearances during England's tour to the West Indies in 1985. He next appeared for Middlesex in the 1985 season, making thereafter 29 further first-class appearances for the county, the last of which came against Worcestershire in the 1989 County Championship. In his 30 first-class matches, he scored 696 runs at an average of 22.45, with a high score of 126. This score was his only first-class century and came against Cambridge University in 1985. With the ball, he took 30 wickets at a bowling average of 38.56, with best figures of 4/49.

He made his List A debut for the county against Lancashire in the 1983 John Player Special League. He made 36 further List A appearances for Middlesex, the last of which came against Worcestershire in the 1989 Refuge Assurance League. In his 37 List A appearances, he scored 386 runs at an average of 20.31, with a high score of 57. This score represented the only time he passed fifty in this format, with it coming against Hampshire in the 1988 Refuge Assurance League. With the ball, he took 25 wickets at an average of 26.76, with best figures of 3/26.

Having been an infrequent part of the Middlesex first team throughout the eighties, Sykes left the county at the end of the 1989 season and joined Durham, then still a Minor county, for the 1990 season. He made a single List A appearance for Durham in the 1990 NatWest Trophy against Lancashire at Old Trafford. In Durham's innings he was dismissed for 4 by Phil DeFreitas, while in Lancashire's innings he took the wicket Mike Atherton, with Lancashire winning by 8 wickets. The 1990 season was his only season playing for Durham, during which he also made two appearances in the Minor Counties Championship and two appearances in the MCCA Knockout Trophy.
