= David Smith (Warwickshire cricketer, born 1962) =

English cricketer

Personal information
- Full name: David Martin Smith
- Born: 21 January 1962 (age 64); Keresley, Warwickshire, England
- Batting: Left-handed
- Bowling: Slow left-arm orthodox

Domestic team information
- Years: Team
- 1989–1994: Hertfordshire
- 1981–1983: Warwickshire

Career statistics
Competition	FC	LA
Matches	4	3
Runs scored	148	79
Batting average	49.33	26.33
100s/50s	1/–	–/–
Top score	100*	39
Balls bowled	342	78
Wickets	2	1
Bowling average	100.50	53.00
5 wickets in innings	–	–
10 wickets in match	–	–
Best bowling	1/44	1/26
Catches/stumpings	2/–	1/–
- Source: Cricinfo, 17 July 2010

David Martin Smith (born 21 January 1962) is a former English cricketer. Smith was a left-handed batsman who bowled slow left-arm orthodox. He is now a teacher at Hitchin Boys' School. He was born at Keresley, Warwickshire.

Smith made his first-class debut for Warwickshire against Hampshire in the 1981 County Championship. From 1981 to 1983, he represented Warwickshire in 3 further first-class matches, with his final first-class appearance coming against Oxford University. In his 4 first-class matches, he scored 148 runs at a batting average of 49.33, with a single century high score of 100* against Oxford University, batting from number 9 in his final first-class match. With the ball, he took 2 wickets at an expensive bowling average of 100.50, with best figures of 1/44.

In 1989, Smith joined Hertfordshire, where he made his debut for the county in the 1989 MCCA Knockout Trophy against Buckinghamshire. His debut for the county in the Minor Counties Championship came in the same season against Cumberland. From 1989 to 1994, he represented the county in 11 MCCA Knockout Trophy matches and from 1989 to 1992, he represented the county in 21 Minor Counties Championship matches.

Smith also represented Hertfordshire in List-A cricket, where he made his debut in List-A cricket against Nottinghamshire in the 1989 NatWest Trophy. Smith played two further List-A matches for the county, both against Warwickshire in the 1990 and 1991 NatWest Trophy. In his three matches he scored 79 runs at an average of 26.33, with a high score of 39. With the ball, he took a single wicket at an average of 53.00, with best figures of 1/26.
