= Timothy Barry =

English cricketer

Timothy James Barry
Personal information
- Full name: Timothy James Barry
- Born: 12 December 1964 (age 61); Chalfont St Giles, Buckinghamshire, England
- Batting: Right-handed
- Bowling: Right-arm medium

Domestic team information
- Years: Team
- 1987–1988: Combined Universities
- 1985–1995: Buckinghamshire

Career statistics
Competition	List A
Matches	12
Runs scored	119
Batting average	17.00
100s/50s	–/–
Top score	39
Balls bowled	456
Wickets	16
Bowling average	23.37
5 wickets in innings	–
10 wickets in match	–
Best bowling	3/26
Catches/stumpings	1/–
- Source: Cricinfo, 4 May 2011

Timothy James Barry (born 12 December 1964) is a former English cricketer. Barry was a right-handed batsman who bowled right-arm medium pace. He was born in Chalfont St Giles, Buckinghamshire.

Barry made his debut for Buckinghamshire in the 1985 Minor Counties Championship against Cheshire. Barry played Minor counties cricket for Buckinghamshire from 1985 to 1995, which included 40 Minor Counties Championship matches and 15 MCCA Knockout Trophy matches.

However, it wasn't for Buckinghamshire that he made his List A debut. This instead came for the Combined Universities team in the 1987 Benson & Hedges Cup against Somerset. He played seven further List A matches for the Combined Universities, spread over the 1987 Benson & Hedges Cup and 1988 Benson & Hedges Cup. He took 10 wickets for the team at a bowling average of 20.90, with best figures of 3/26.

He later made his first List A appearance for Buckinghamshire in the 1990 NatWest Trophy against Northamptonshire. He played three further List A matches for the county, the last coming against Leicestershire in the 1993 NatWest Trophy. With the ball he took 6 wickets for Buckinghamshire in List A matches, at an average of 27.50, with best figures of 3/49. This left him with an overall List A bowling average of 23.37.

He also played Second XI cricket for the Essex Second XI and the Derbyshire Second XI.
