= Andrew Mildenhall =

English cricketer

Personal information
- Full name: Andrew Mildenhall
- Born: 2 December 1966 (age 59); Swindon, Wiltshire, England
- Nickname: Milders
- Bowling: Right-arm fast-medium
- Relatives: Josh Mildenhall

Domestic team information
- Years: Team
- 1989–1990: Wiltshire

Career statistics
Competition	LA
Matches	2
Runs scored	5
Batting average	2.50
100s/50s	–/–
Top score	3
Balls bowled	90
Wickets	1
Bowling average	77.00
5 wickets in innings	–
10 wickets in match	–
Best bowling	1/32
Catches/stumpings	–/–
- Source: Cricinfo, 12 October 2010

Andrew Mildenhall (born 2 December 1966) is a current English cricketer. Mildenhall is a right-handed batsman who bowls right-arm fast-medium. He was born in Swindon, Wiltshire. He currently plays for the Wiltshire over 50's.

Mildenhall made his Minor Counties Championship debut for Wiltshire in 1989 against Berkshire. From 1989 to 1990, he represented the county in 6 Minor Counties Championship matches, the last of which came against Droset. Mildenhall also represented Wiltshire in a single MCCA Knockout Trophy match against Cornwall in 1990.

Mildenhall also represented Wiltshire in 2 List A matches. His first match came against Warwickshire in the 1989 NatWest Trophy, with his second and last List A match coming against Surrey in the 1990 NatWest Trophy. In his 2 matches, he scored 5 runs at a batting average of 2.50, with a high score of 3. With the ball he took a single wicket at a bowling average of 77.00, with best figures of 1/32.
