= Bramdean School =

Location
- Richmond Lodge; Homefield Road; Heavitree; Exeter, Devon, EX1 2QR; England; 50°43′25″N 3°30′29″W

Information
- Type: Private school
- Motto: Tenax et Fortis (Latin: Steadfast and courageous)
- Established: 1901
- Founder: Rev Thomas Walters
- Closed: 2020
- Department for Education URN: 113562 Tables
- Ofsted: Reports
- Headmistress: Diane Stoneman
- Gender: Mixed-sex education
- Age: 3 to 18
- Enrolment: 70

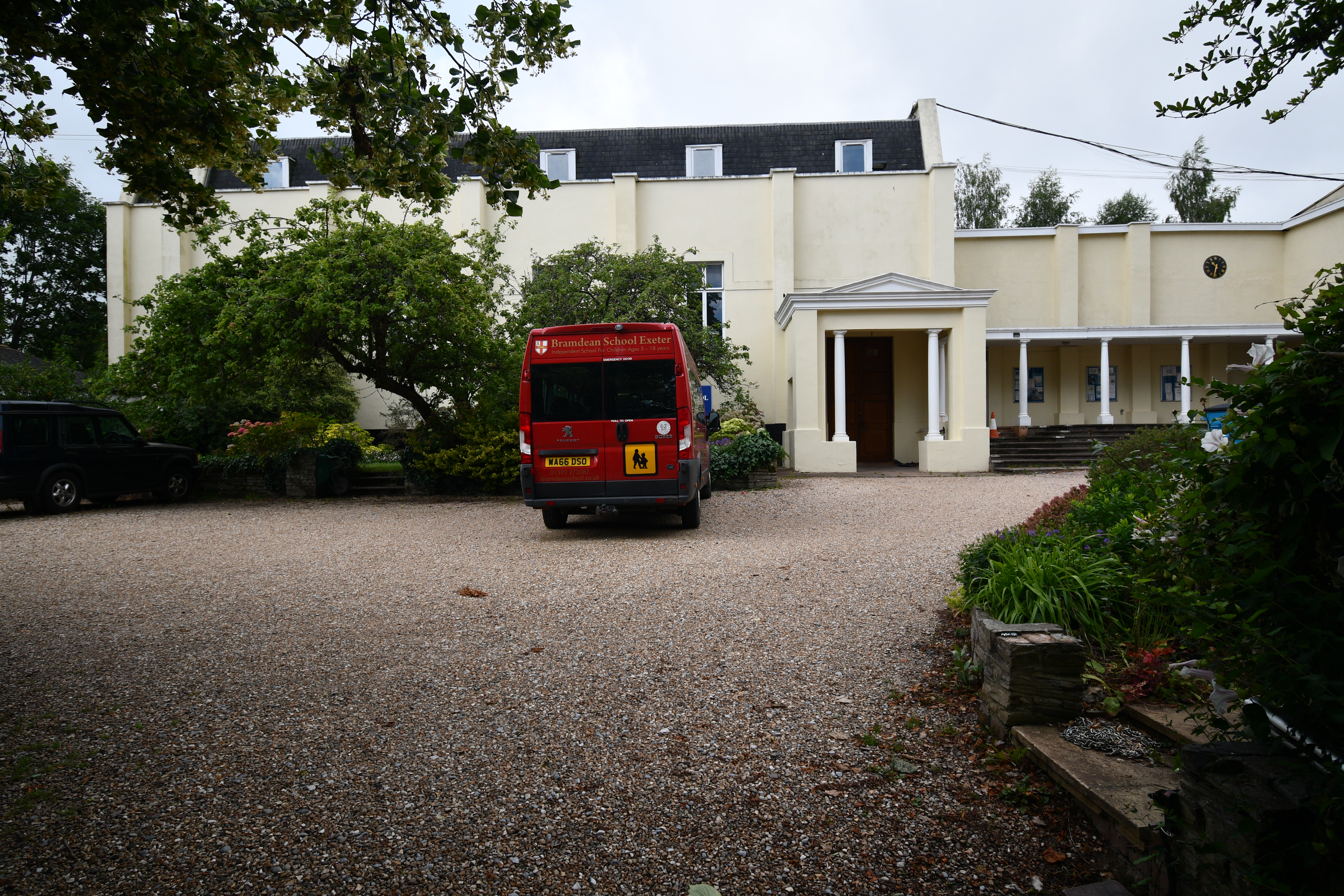
The school building, 2020

Bramdean School, Exeter was a private school situated in Heavitree, Exeter, founded in 1901 and closed in 2020.

Bramdean School was a non-selective mixed independent school of up to 200 pupils located in Heavitree, Exeter, Devon. Sporting coaches include Javier Martin Cortes, former La Liga Barcelona FC Academy coach, Keith Brown, former vice-captain of Middlesex County Cricket Club, and Jill Stone, former junior Wimbledon player, and development coach of the Lawn Tennis Association. The school motto "Tenax et Fortis" translates as "steadfast and courageous".

== Notable former pupils ==
Former alumni include Kristian Digby.

== Redevelopment of site ==
The school buildings have since been developed into a number of apartments and houses which retain some references to the school but are collectively known as Richmond Grove.
