= Paul Bail =

English cricketer (1965–2024)

Personal information
- Full name: Paul Andrew Clayden Bail
- Born: 23 June 1965; Burnham-on-Sea, Somerset, England
- Died: 24 February 2024 (aged 58)
- Batting: Right-handed
- Bowling: Right-arm off break

Domestic team information
- Years: Team
- 1985–1986: Somerset
- 1986–1988: Cambridge University
- 1989–1990: Wiltshire
- First-class debut: 29 May 1985 Somerset v Yorkshire
- Last First-class: 5 May 1988 Cambridge University v Glamorgan
- List A debut: 15 June 1985 Somerset v Zimbabweans
- Last List A: 27 June 1990 Wiltshire v Surrey

Career statistics
Competition	FC	LA
Matches	29	18
Runs scored	1016	324
Batting average	21.61	21.60
100s/50s	1/3	0/3
Top score	174	66
Balls bowled	132	24
Wickets	1	1
Bowling average	103.00	20.00
5 wickets in innings	0	0
10 wickets in match	0	n/a
Best bowling	1/36	1/20
Catches/stumpings	7/–	1/–
- Source: CricketArchive, 20 December 2009

Paul Andrew Clayden Bail (23 June 1965 – 24 February 2024) was an English cricketer who played first-class cricket for Somerset and for Cambridge University.

== Career ==
Educated at Millfield School, Bail was a right-handed opening or middle order batsman and an occasional right-arm off-break bowler. He made his first-class debut with five matches for Somerset in the 1985 season, but made little impact until the last match of the season, against Kent at St Lawrence Ground, Canterbury, when he made an unbeaten 78 in 167 minutes as Somerset sought unsuccessfully to force a victory that would have enabled them to avoid finishing bottom of the County Championship.

In 1986, Bail was at Cambridge University and was the university cricket team's "most talented batsman" in the opinion of Wisden, "although until scoring a remarkable maiden hundred against Oxford at Lord's, he did not produce the major innings upon which the University's batting was relying". The "remarkable" innings was one of 174 in the University match, at the time the seventh highest innings in a fixture that dates back to 1829. At the end of the season, he played two further matches for Somerset, his final games for the county.

Bail continued to play for Cambridge University in 1987 and appeared again in the University match that season: his average was, however, only 18.35. His one innings of more than 50 was a score of 90, again in the University match. In 1988, he appeared only four times for Cambridge and did not win a Blue. Those were his final appearances in first-class cricket.

After university, Bail played for a couple of seasons in Minor Counties cricket for Wiltshire. Having played List A cricket for both Somerset and the combined universities side, he appeared twice for Wiltshire in the NatWest Trophy.

Later he played in London club cricket for Richmond and for the Club Cricket Conference. His younger brother Stephen also played for Somerset's second eleven. Bail's death on 24 February 2024 was reported on Somerset County Cricket Club's website. He was 58.
