= Gary Brown (cricketer) =

English cricketer

Personal information
- Full name: Gary Kevin Brown
- Born: 16 June 1965 (age 61); Welling, Kent, England
- Batting: Right-handed
- Bowling: Right-arm off break
- Relatives: Keith Brown (Brother)

Domestic team information
- Years: Team
- 1999–2001: Durham Cricket Board
- 1988–1992: Durham
- 1989–1991: Minor Counties
- 1986: Middlesex

Career statistics
Competition	FC	LA
Matches	6	20
Runs scored	345	402
Batting average	38.33	20.10
100s/50s	1/1	–/1
Top score	103	82
Balls bowled	108	6
Wickets	1	–
Bowling average	103.00	–
5 wickets in innings	–	–
10 wickets in match	–	–
Best bowling	1/39	–
Catches/stumpings	5/–	5/–
- Source: Cricinfo, 23 December 2009

Gary Kevin Brown (born 16 June 1965 in Welling, Kent) is a former English cricketer. Brown was a right-handed batsman who bowled right-arm off break.

Brown made his first-class debut for Middlesex in the 1986 County Championship against Nottinghamshire. This was Brown's only appearance for Middlesex. His brother Keith played for Middlesex for 15 seasons from 1984 to 1998.

In 1988 Brown joined Durham, making his debut in the Minor Counties Championship against Bedfordshire.

In 1989 Brown made his List-A debut, representing a combined Minor Counties team against Yorkshire, playing four matches in Group C of the Benson and Hedges Cup. In the same competition Brown made his one-day debut for Durham against his former club Middlesex.

In 1990 Brown made a first-class appearance for a Combined Minor Counties team against the touring Indians, who had Mohammad Azharuddin, Kapil Dev, Anil Kumble and Sachin Tendulkar in their team. It was during that season that Brown played his final one-day match for Durham against Lancashire.

Brown represented the combined Minor Counties in four matches in 1991. Brown continued to represent Durham in the Minor Counties Championship until 1992 when the county was promoted to first-class status, thereby allowing them entry to the County Championship. Brown made his Durham first-class debut against Oxford University in April 1992. Brown would play in three County Championship matches in 1992, the last of which came against Hampshire. Brown was released by Durham at the end of the 1992 County Championship.

In 1999 Brown began playing for the Durham Cricket Board, representing them in Minor Counties Trophy matches and seven one-day matches between 1999 and 2001, with his final List-A match coming against Hertfordshire in May 2001.
