= Oastler Shopping Centre =

Historic Marketplace in Bradford, West Yorkshire, England

- Oastler Shopping Centre Entrance
- Interactive map of the Oastler Shopping Centre area
- Former names: John Street Market
- Alternative names: Oastler Centre

General information
- Type: Commercial
- Location: 3SR, John Street, Bradford BD1 3JS, Bradford, England
- Coordinates: 53.7963°N 1.7579°W
- Completed: June 30, 1930
- Renovated: June 2002
- Closed: June 28, 2025
- Owner: Bradford Metropolitan District Council

Website
- https://www.bradfordmarkets.com/the-markets/oastler/

The Oastler Shopping Centre, formerly known as the John Street Market and commonly known as just the "Oastler Centre" to locals, was a market located on Westgate in the city centre of Bradford, West Yorkshire, England.

The centre contained 176 stalls comprising a retail area of 25,538² ft, with an additional 23 external shops and 27 storerooms. The cafes and stalls within the centre are various food, clothing and craft shops with some of the cafes and stalls having been in business since the 1960s.

The original market site was built on 30 June 1930, then called the John Street Market, and was an open-air market, compared to the indoor market centre it is today. The original outdoor open-air market was renovated to an indoor market in the early 1970s to make economic improvements to the upper side of the city centre and was named for the abolitionist Richard Oastler.

As part of the Bradford's regeneration projects in line with the successful UK City of Culture 2025 bid, the Oastler Centre was scheduled to be demolished in late 2023 to make way for the new Darley Street Market.

The market had its final day of trading on 28 June 2025 and is scheduled to be demolished in late 2025.

== History ==
The Oastler Centre can trace its origins back to the 1930s, with the then called John Street Market completed on 30 June 1930. The market was popular with local Bradfordians and existed in the city centre alongside other markets, including the Victorian Arndale Centre which was demolished in 1976 to make way for the new Kirkgate Market.

During 1989, due to serious Health and Safety within John Street Market, as well as economic concerns relating to the nearby Rawson Market, major redevelopment works were conducted leading to the demolition and relocation of tenants of Rawson Market in 1997.

Opening of the then John Street Market, 30 June 1930

Bronze statue of Richard Oastler situated in the now Oastler Square

The then John Street Market was renamed to the now Oastler Shopping Centre in 2002 after £4.5 million renovations to the market were made. The market was named for Richard Oastler, a prominent 19th century abolitionist and politician, in memory of the liberation of impoverished factory serfs; a memorial statue of Oastler was also moved to the accompanying Rawson Square, having originally been situated nearby Forster Square where it was originally erected in 1869 by Lord Shaftesbury. Today, the statue is situated in the now Oastler Square and is a Grade II listed building by Historic England.

In 2016, plans were made to relocate the entrance to the east-facing side of the centre to create more space for outdoor stalls. However, the closure of the nearby Morrisons supermarket made the 2016 plans no longer economically viable.

As a part of Bradford Council's long-term plans, it was announced that the centre would be demolished in late 2023 and replaced with a new marketplace known as Darley Street Market.

== John Market Street 1977 Fire ==
On 4 November 1977 a fire broke out in the then John Street Market, destroying a majority of the stalls and cafes at the time before the fire crews arrived at the scene. Due to the severity of the fire, fire crews from neighbouring Halifax, Leeds, Keighley and Rawdon were called to the scene. A full report into the cause of the fire was never completed and the cause of the fire remains a mystery to this day.

== Bradford Jewish Heritage Trail ==
The Bradford Jewish Heritage Trail is an initiative funded by the National Lottery Heritage Fund, the trail includes the site of the now Oastler Shopping Centre due to a local legend surrounding an old Jewish tailors shop known as "Fanny Feinburgh's Tailors Shop" which was due to be demolished by the local council of the time. The owner of the tailors shop, Fanny, had refused to vacate the premises, after which, the council began demolition work on the shop, causing injury to Fanny due to falling bricks. Fanny Feinburgh's Tailors Shop was demolished in 1969.

== In popular culture ==
The Oastler Centre has been host to a variety of major television and film productions, including the 2013 BBC TV Series The Great Train Robbery, starring Jim Broadbent and Luke Evans and the 2017 film Funny Cow, starring Maxine Peake and Paddy Considine.

Building up to the closure of the Oastler Centre, Bradford Producing Hub supported the independent project "Oastler Market Speaks", a collection of stories relating to the Oastler Centre, including "Shutters Down" an audio play written by local poet Kirsty Taylor.

== Closure ==
In April 2019, Bradford Metropolitan District Council approved plans for a new shopping centre on the old site of the M&S store located on Darley Street. The new market was designed by architectural firm Greig & Stephenson, whose previous works included Borough Market in London as well as other markets located in Leicester, Rotherham and Hong Kong.

During meetings at Bradford Council's Regulatory and Appeals Committee, it was announced that the development of the new Darley Street Market would be completed by late 2021, however, delays to the development were heavy due to the COVID-19 pandemic.

The Oastler Centre was due to close in late 2023 to 2024, and after extensive delays closed on 28 June 2025. Following the closure of the Oastler Centre, the centre along with the nearby Kirkgate Market will be demolished and replaced with green space, housing and new commercial spaces in line with the new Darley Street Market and planned "City Village", an area of green space nearby the site. The "City Village" initiative is part of Bradford Metropolitan District Council's 10-year plan to redevelop the area around the Oastler Centre and accompanying Kirkgate Market and includes plans to redevelop the area along with the construction of a new market, the Darley Street Market. The initial total cost of the "City Village" initiative plan is £24.05 million, with £3 million being funded by the "Getting Building Fund", the rest is funded by the city council itself.
