= Anthony Dutton =

English cricketer (born 1963)

Personal information
- Full name: Anthony John Dutton
- Born: 11 June 1963 (age 63); Stoke-on-Trent, Staffordshire, England
- Batting: Right-handed
- Bowling: Right-arm medium

Domestic team information
- Years: Team
- 1984–1997: Staffordshire

Career statistics
Competition	List A
Matches	6
Runs scored	126
Batting average	21.00
100s/50s	–/–
Top score	34
Balls bowled	316
Wickets	2
Bowling average	106.50
5 wickets in innings	–
10 wickets in match	–
Best bowling	1/31
Catches/stumpings	–/–
- Source: Cricinfo, 17 June 2011

Anthony John Dutton (born 11 June 1963) is a former English cricketer. Dutton was a right-handed batsman who bowled right-arm medium pace. He was born in Stoke-on-Trent, Staffordshire.

Dutton made his debut for Staffordshire in the 1984 Minor Counties Championship against Cambridgeshire. Dutton next played Minor counties cricket for Staffordshire in 1989, representing the county from then to till 1997, which included 47 Minor Counties Championship matches and 19 MCCA Knockout Trophy matches. In 1988, he made his List A debut against Surrey in the NatWest Trophy. He made five further appearances in List A cricket, the last coming against Derbyshire in the 1996 NatWest Trophy. In his 6 List A matches, he scored 126 runs at an average of 21.00, with a high score of 34. With the ball, he took 2 wickets at an expensive average of 106.50, with best figures of 1/31.
