= Keith Brown (cricketer) =

English cricketer (born 1963)

Personal information
- Full name: Keith Robert Brown
- Born: 18 March 1963 (age 63); Edmonton, Middlesex, England
- Batting: Right-handed
- Bowling: Right-arm slow medium
- Role: Wicketkeeper
- Relatives: Brother, Gary Brown

Domestic team information
- Years: Team
- 1984–1998: Middlesex

Career statistics
Competition	First-class	List A
Matches	247	248
Runs scored	10,487	4,749
Batting average	35.19	29.31
100s/50s	13/56	4/14
Top score	200*	114
Balls bowled	321	40
Wickets	6	–
Bowling average	46.00	–
5 wickets in innings	–	–
10 wickets in match	–	–
Best bowling	2/7	0/0
Catches/stumpings	466/33	168/49
- Source: CricketArchive, 15 November 2024

Keith Robert Brown (born 18 March 1963 in Edmonton, Middlesex, England) is a former English first-class cricketer.

Keith Brown was educated at the Chace Comprehensive School, Enfield and he represented Middlesex as a right-handed batsman, wicket-keeper and occasional right-arm slow-medium bowler in 247 first-class matches between 1984 and 1998, scoring 10,487 runs (average 35.19; highest score 200 not out) with 499 dismissals (466 catches and 33 stumpings). He was the county's sixth most prolific wicket-keeper.

He also scored 4,749 runs in 248 List A matches (average 29.31; highest score 114) with 217 dismissals (168 catches and 49 stumpings).

He was awarded his county cap in 1990 and a benefit in 1998. He also served as vice-captain under the Middlesex captain Mark Ramprakash. Upon his retirement from first-class cricket in 1998, he became a gamesmaster and form tutor at Bramdean School, Exeter, Devon.
