= Phil Carrick =

English cricketer

Personal information
- Full name: Phillip Carrick
- Born: 16 July 1952; Armley, Yorkshire, England
- Died: 11 January 2000 (aged 47); West Morton, Yorkshire, England
- Height: 6 ft 0 in (1.83 m)
- Batting: Right-handed
- Bowling: Slow left arm orthodox

Domestic team information
- Years: Team
- 1970–1993: Yorkshire
- 1976–1977: Eastern Province
- 1982–1983: Northern Transvaal

Career statistics
Competition	First-class	List A
Matches	444	311
Runs scored	10,300	2,188
Batting average	22.00	14.02
100s/50s	3/41	–/2
Top score	131 not out	54
Balls bowled	78,325	11,853
Wickets	1,081	249
Bowling average	29.82	30.67
5 wickets in innings	47	2
10 wickets in match	5	n/a
Best bowling	8/33	5/22
Catches/stumpings	197/–	70/–
- Source: CricketArchive, 8 September 2009

Phillip Carrick (16 July 1952 – 11 January 2000) was an English first-class cricketer, who played for Yorkshire County Cricket Club between 1970 and 1993.

Carrick was born in Armley, Leeds, Yorkshire, England, educated at Park Lane College of Further Education, and began his first-class career in 1970. The left-arm spinner, nicknamed "Fergie", took more than 1,000 wickets over his twenty three-year career, and fell just six runs short of hitting 10,000 first-class runs for Yorkshire. His bowling partnership with Geoff Cope was a successful one for the county. He captained Yorkshire to victory over Northamptonshire in the 1987 Benson & Hedges Cup, having had his benefit season in 1985. As well as Yorkshire he spent two seasons playing in South Africa with Eastern Province and Northern Transvaal. After retiring from first-class cricket in 1993, he continued to play local league cricket, captaining Pudsey Congs to the Bradford League title and he also had success as an umpire for the ECB.

He died of leukaemia aged 47 in January 2000, survived by his wife and two daughters. His funeral was held in Bradford Cathedral. Among those attending were his cricketing colleagues Brian Close, Ray Illingworth, Martyn Moxon, Dickie Bird, Graham Gooch, Mike Gatting and John Emburey.
