= Dean Hodgson =

English cricketer (born 1966)

Personal information
- Full name: Geoffrey Dean Hodgson
- Born: 22 October 1966 (age 60); Carlisle, Cumberland, England
- Nickname: Deano
- Height: 6 ft 1 in (1.85 m)
- Batting: Right-handed
- Role: Opening batsman

Domestic team information
- Years: Team
- 1984–1989: Cumberland
- 1987: Warwickshire
- 1989–1995: Gloucestershire

Career statistics
Competition	First-class	List A
Matches	103	68
Runs scored	5,675	1,590
Batting average	33.57	26.50
100s/50s	9/35	2/6
Top score	166	104*
Balls bowled	24	–
Wickets	0	–
Bowling average	–	–
5 wickets in innings	–	–
10 wickets in match	–	–
Best bowling	–	–
Catches/stumpings	45/–	17/–
- Source: Cricinfo, 6 December 2011

Geoffrey Dean Hodgson (born 22 October 1966) is a former English cricketer. Hodgson played as a right-handed opening batsman. He was born in Carlisle, Cumberland and played Minor Counties cricket for Cumberland County Cricket Club between 1984 and 1989, initially whilst studying Human Biology at Loughborough University.

Whilst a student, Hodgson played for Lancashire Second XI intermittently from 1983 to 1986, before joining Warwickshire for two seasons between 1987 and 1988 whilst at University . He made a single senior appearance for the county in 1987, before joining Gloucestershire in 1989. After initially playing mainly in the second XI, Hodgson came close to retiring as a professional before being called in to the first XI due to other players being injured and then scoring well. He played in over 100 first-class cricket matches for Gloucestershire in a career which lasted until the end of the 1995 season, scoring a thousand runs in a season 3 times .
