= Richard Merriman =

English cricketer

Personal information
- Full name: Richard Peter Merriman
- Born: 12 October 1958 (age 68); Loughborough, Leicestershire, England
- Batting: Right-handed
- Bowling: Leg break
- Role: Occasional wicketkeeper

Domestic team information
- Years: Team
- 1986–1990: Dorset
- 1991–1998: Cambridgeshire

Career statistics
Competition	List A
Matches	5
Runs scored	64
Batting average	12.80
100s/50s	0/0
Top score	25
Balls bowled	18
Wickets	2
Bowling average	16.00
5 wickets in innings	0
10 wickets in match	0
Best bowling	2/32
Catches/stumpings	0/–
- Source: Cricinfo, 21 March 2010

Richard Peter Merriman (born 12 November 1958) was an English cricketer. Merriman was a right-handed batsman, a leg break bowler and occasionally played as a wicketkeeper.

Merriman made his debut for Dorset in the 1986 Minor Counties Championship against Wiltshire. From 1986 to 1990, Merriman represented Dorset in 41 Minor Counties Championship matches, with his final appearance for the county coming against Buckinghamshire in 1990.

In the same year that Merriman made his Minor Counties debut for Dorset, he also made his List-A debut for the county against the Somerset in the 1st round of the 1986 NatWest Trophy. Merriman made 3 List-A appearances for the county from 1986 to 1990, with his final List-A match for Dorset coming against Glamorgan in the 1st round of the 1990 NatWest Trophy. At the end of the 1990 season, Merriman parted company with Dorset.

In 1991, Merriman made his debut for Cambridgeshire in the Minor Counties Championship against Suffolk. From 1991 to 1997, Merriman represented the county in 20 Minor Counties Championship matches, with his final Minor Counties match coming against Devon.

In the same year that he made his Minor Counties debut for Cambridgeshire, he also made his List-A debut for the county against the Kent in the 1st round of the 1991 NatWest Trophy. Merriman made 2 List-A appearances for the county from 1991 to 1997, with his second and final List-A match for Cambridgeshire coming against Hampshire in the 1st round of the 1997 NatWest Trophy.

Merriman has also represented Huntingdonshire in non List-A matches against the Northamptonshire Second XI, Wiltshire and the Nottinghamshire Second XI.
