= Danny Kelleher =

English cricketer

Personal information
- Full name: Daniel John Michael Kelleher
- Born: 5 May 1966; Southwark, London
- Died: 12 December 1995 (aged 29); Barnehurst, London Borough of Bexley
- Batting: Right-handed
- Bowling: Right-arm fast-medium
- Role: Bowler
- Relatives: Harry Kelleher (uncle)

Domestic team information
- Years: Team
- 1987–1991: Kent

Career statistics
Competition	First-class	List A
Matches	34	31
Runs scored	565	91
Batting average	15.27	9.10
100s/50s	0/2	0/0
Top score	53*	21
Balls bowled	4,906	1,489
Wickets	77	22
Bowling average	32.89	41.81
5 wickets in innings	2	0
10 wickets in match	0	–
Best bowling	6/109	3/16
Catches/stumpings	8/–	7/–
- Source: Cricinfo.com, 7 July 2009

Daniel John Michael Kelleher (5 May 1966 – 12 December 1995) was an English professional cricketer.

Kelleher was born at Southwark in London in May 1966. He was educated at St. Mary's Grammar School, Sidcup and Erith College of Technology and represented Kent Schools at both cricket and Rugby union.

Spotted at Dartford Cricket Club, he joined Kent County Cricket Club in 1985. A right arm fast medium bowler and aggressive lower order batsman, he took 77 wickets and scored 565 runs in 34 games for the county.

During his début season in 1987, he took 6 wickets for 109 runs against Somerset at Bath, figures which would be the best of his career. In 1988, he hit a 42 ball fifty—including four sixes and five fours—against a touring West Indian side.

Kelleher was released by Kent in 1991. He later signed a contract with Surrey but did not appear for them in first-class cricket. He coached in Argentina in late 1994 and returned to England, where he contacted several counties requesting a trial, but received no responses.

He died in December 1995 at his home in Barnehurst after overdosing on Prozac. He was a nephew of Harry Kelleher, who played for Northants and Surrey in the 1950s.
