= Andrew Bee (cricketer) =

English-born Scottish cricketer (born 1965)

Personal information
- Full name: Andrew Bee
- Born: 24 January 1965 (age 61); Bridgnorth, Shropshire, England
- Batting: Right-handed
- Bowling: Right-arm medium-fast

International information
- National side: Scotland

Domestic team information
- Years: Team
- 1989–1993: Scotland

Career statistics
Competition	First-class	List A
Matches	4	15
Runs scored	53	74
Batting average	–	8.22
100s/50s	–/–	–/–
Top score	29*	35
Balls bowled	655	654
Wickets	4	10
Bowling average	90.00	47.50
5 wickets in innings	–	–
10 wickets in match	–	–
Best bowling	2/20	4/31
Catches/stumpings	2/–	1/–
- Source: Cricinfo, 12 July 2011

Andrew Bee (born 24 January 1965) is a former Scottish cricketer. Bee was a right-handed batsman who bowled right-arm medium-fast. He was born in Bridgnorth, Staffordshire.

Bee made 4 first-class appearances for Scotland between 1988 and 1993, all of which came against Ireland. In his 4 first-class matches, he took 4 wickets at an average of 90.00, with best figures of 2/20.

He made his List A debut for Scotland against Leicestershire in the 1989 Benson & Hedges Cup. He made 14 further List A appearances, the last of which came against Essex in the 1993 Benson & Hedges Cup. In his 15 List A matches for the county, he scored 74 runs at a batting average of 8.22, with a high score of 35. With the ball, he took 10 wickets at an average of 47.50, with best figures of 4/31.
