= Death by misadventure =

Death by voluntary risk

In the United Kingdom, death by misadventure is the recorded manner of death for an accidental death caused by a risk taken voluntarily.

Misadventure in English law, as recorded by coroners and on death certificates and associated documents, is a death that is primarily attributed to an accident that occurred due to a risk that was taken voluntarily. In contrast, when the manner of death is given as an accident, the coroner has determined that the decedent had taken no unreasonable wilful risk.

"Misadventure may be the right conclusion when a death arises from some deliberate human act which unexpectedly and unintentionally goes wrong."

Legally defined manner of death: a way by which an actual cause of death (trauma, exposure, etc.) was allowed to occur. For example, a death caused by an illicit drug overdose may be ruled a death by misadventure, as the user took the risk of drug usage voluntarily. Misadventure is a form of unnatural death, a category that also includes accidental death, suicide, and homicide.

In the case of R v Wolverhampton Coroner, it was held that the coroner must establish death by misadventure on the balance of probabilities, commonly known as "more likely than not". This is opposed to beyond reasonable doubt, which is used elsewhere.

== Selected list of deaths by misadventure ==
List of deaths by misadventure
Person	Date of death	Manner of death	Ref
Kristian Digby	1 March 2010	Auto-erotic asphyxiation	
Brian Jones	3 July 1969	Drowned in a pool	
Julia Lennon	15 July 1958	Hit by car	
Gaynor Lord	c. 8 December 2023	Drowned in a river	
Stephen Milligan	7 February 1994	Auto-erotic asphyxiation	
Bon Scott	19 February 1980	Alcohol poisoning	
Oliver Steeper	23 September 2021	Choked at nursery	
Amy Winehouse	23 July 2011	Alcohol poisoning	

== See also ==
- Inquests in England and Wales
