= Bradford Burns Unit =

English research facility

Coordinates: 53°47′26.7″N 1°45′51.5″W

The Bradford Burns Unit is a burns research facility set up at University of Bradford following the Bradford fire disaster on 11 May 1985. The fire disaster at Valley Parade killed 56 people and injured more than 250.

Professor David Sharpe founded the Bradford Burns Unit after he received many of the burns victims from the Bradford Fire Disaster. On 11 May 1985, just before half time during the former Division 3 fixture between Bradford City Football Club and Lincoln City Football Club, in the last game of the 1984–85 season, a fire broke out in the G block of the main stand at Valley Parade. The fire quickly spread and within minutes the whole of the wooden main stand was engulfed, resulting in the deaths of 56 people and injury of more than 250. After a full inquest, it was revealed that the cause of the fire was a disregarded cigarette, which had been dropped where there was a build-up of litter. This caught fire and, with the assistance of wind and a wooden stand, the fire had spread quickly. The horrific injuries that Sharpe had to treat along with other staff led to his setting up the Bradford Burns Unit at Bradford University to research ways of treating burns injuries.

Bradford newspaper Telegraph & Argus set up an appeal to save the Bradford Burns Unit in 2009 after it was reported that the Bradford Burns Unit needed £100,000 to keep doing its research work. As a result of the need for ongoing funding for the Burns Unit, in late 2010 Bantams Trek was set up to raise money for it. It was given its name as the majority of events would involve walking. It was set up by Bradford City assistant kit manager Graham Duckworth whose first walk was from Bradford City's home ground Valley Parade to Lincoln City's home ground at Sincil Bank, a 73-mile walk completed in under 24 hours on 1 January 2011. It raised £6,660 for the Bradford Burns Unit and a presentation was made at half time of the corresponding fixture between Bradford City and Lincoln City at Valley Parade on 2 February 2011.
