= 1974 Benson & Hedges Cup =

- Administrator: Test and County Cricket Board
- Cricket format: Limited overs cricket (55 overs per innings)
- Champions: Surrey (1st title)
- Participants: 20
- Matches: 47
- Most runs: 369 Barry Richards (Hampshire)
- Most wickets: 17 Robin Jackman (Surrey)/Garth McKenzie (Leicesters)

The 1974 Benson & Hedges Cup was the third edition of cricket's Benson & Hedges Cup. The competition was won by Surrey County Cricket Club.

== Fixtures and results ==
=== Group stage ===
==== Midlands Group ====
| Team | Pld | W | L | Pts | BowSR |
|---|---|---|---|---|---|
| Worcestershire | 4 | 3 | 1 | 9 | 34.143 |
| Leicestershire | 4 | 3 | 1 | 9 | 42.581 |
| Warwickshire | 4 | 3 | 1 | 9 | 51.52 |
| Northamptonshire | 4 | 1 | 3 | 3 | 46.815 |
| Middlesex | 4 | 0 | 4 | 0 | 45.808 |

==== Northern Group ====
| Team | Pld | W | L | Pts | BowSR |
|---|---|---|---|---|---|
| Lancashire | 4 | 4 | 0 | 12 | 38.294 |
| Yorkshire | 4 | 3 | 1 | 9 | 36.139 |
| Derbyshire | 4 | 2 | 2 | 6 | 36.114 |
| Nottinghamshire | 4 | 1 | 3 | 3 | 45.857 |
| Minor Counties North | 4 | 0 | 4 | 0 | 62.667 |

==== Southern Group ====
| Team | Pld | W | L | Pts | BowSR |
|---|---|---|---|---|---|
| Kent | 4 | 4 | 0 | 12 | 32.605 |
| Surrey | 4 | 3 | 1 | 9 | 30.154 |
| Essex | 4 | 2 | 2 | 6 | 39.226 |
| Sussex | 4 | 1 | 3 | 3 | 38.938 |
| Cambridge University | 4 | 0 | 4 | 0 | 65.667 |

==== Western Group ====
| Team | Pld | W | L | Pts | BowSR |
|---|---|---|---|---|---|
| Hampshire | 4 | 4 | 0 | 12 | 28.550 |
| Somerset | 4 | 3 | 1 | 9 | 40.281 |
| Gloucestershire | 4 | 2 | 2 | 6 | 40.969 |
| Glamorgan | 4 | 1 | 3 | 3 | 51.286 |
| Minor Counties South | 4 | 0 | 4 | 0 | 40.500 |

=== Quarter-finals ===
12 June 1974
(scorecard)

| Leicestershire; 238/8 (55 overs) | v | Kent; 230/9 (45.5 overs) |
| Barry Dudleston 79; Bob Woolmer 3/29 (11 overs) | | Brian Luckhurst 111; Garth McKenzie 5/34 (11 overs) |

Leicestershire won by 8 runs
St Lawrence Ground, Canterbury
Umpires: Ron Aspinall & Barry Meyer
Player of the match: Brian Luckhurst (Kent)

12 June 1974
(scorecard)

| Hampshire; 182 all out (53.3 overs) | v | Somerset; 183/9 all out (54 overs) |
| Trevor Jesty 79; Hallam Moseley 3/28 (10.3 overs) | | Ian Botham 45*; Trevor Jesty 4/28 (11 overs) |

Somerset won by 1 wicket
County Ground, Taunton
Umpires: Ray Julian & George Pope
Player of the match: Ian Botham (Somerset)

12 June 1974
(scorecard)

| Surrey; 225/7 (55 overs) | v | Yorkshire; 201 all out (52.5 overs) |
| Geoff Howarth 80; Chris Old 3/51 (11 overs) | | Barrie Leadbeater 62; Robin Jackman 4/35 (10 overs) |

Surrey won by 24 runs
Kennington Oval, London
Umpires: Henry Horton & Dusty Rhodes
Player of the match: Geoff Howarth (Surrey)

12 June 1974
(scorecard)

| Lancashire; 204/7 (55 overs) | v | Worcestershire; 168 all out (51.1 overs) |
| Barry Wood 67; Vanburn Holder 3/32 (11 overs) | | John Parker 42; Ken Shuttleworth 3/37 (9.1 overs) |

Lancashire won by 36 runs
New Road, Worcester
Umpires: Jack Crapp & Charlie Elliott
Player of the match: Barry Wood (Lancashire)

=== Semi-finals ===
26 June 1974
(scorecard)

| Surrey; 193/8 (55 overs) | v | Lancashire; 130 all out (47.1 overs) |
| John Edrich 62; Clive Lloyd 2/54 (8 overs) | | Clive Lloyd 50; Alan Butcher 3/11 (11 overs) |

Surrey won by 63 runs
Old Trafford, Manchester
Umpires: Lloyd Budd & Arthur Jepson
Player of the match: John Edrich (Surrey)

26, 27 June 1974
(scorecard)

| Leicestershire; 270/8 (55 overs) | v | Somerset; 130 all out (40.4 overs) |
| John Steele 91; Allan Jones 3/39 (11 overs) | | Viv Richards 42; Ray Illingworth 5/20 (11 overs) |

Leicestershire won by 140 runs
Grace Road, Leicester
Umpires: Sam Cook & David Evans
Player of the match: Brian Davison (Leicestershire)

- The match went into a second day. Somerset were 20/2 at the close of the first day.

=== Final ===
20 July 1974
(scorecard)

| Surrey; 170 all out (54.1 overs) | v | Leicestershire; 143 all out (54 overs) |
| Younis Ahmed 43; Ken Higgs 4/10 (7 overs) | | Chris Balderstone 32; Geoff Arnold 3/20 (10 overs) |

Surrey won by 27 runs
Lord's, London
Umpires: Bill Alley & Dickie Bird
Player of the match: John Edrich (Surrey)

== See also ==
Benson & Hedges Cup
