= 1975 Benson & Hedges Cup =

- Administrator: Test and County Cricket Board
- Cricket format: Limited overs cricket (55 overs per innings)
- Champions: Leicestershire (2nd title)
- Participants: 20
- Matches: 47
- Most runs: 322 Chris Balderstone (Leicestershire)
- Most wickets: 17 Ken Higgs (Leicestershire)

The 1975 Benson & Hedges Cup was the fourth edition of cricket's Benson & Hedges Cup. The competition was won by Leicestershire County Cricket Club.

== Fixtures and results ==
=== Group stage ===
==== Midlands Group ====
Team	Pld	W	L	Pts	BowSR
Warwickshire	4	4	0	12	33.054
Leicestershire	4	3	1	9	48.111
Oxford and Cambridge Universities	4	2	2	6	45.000
Northamptonshire	4	1	3	3	42.929
Worcestershire	4	0	4	0	47.625

==== Northern Group ====
Team	Pld	W	L	Pts	BowSR
Lancashire	4	4	0	12	50.231
Yorkshire	4	3	1	9	35.629
Derbyshire	4	2	2	6	43.967
Nottinghamshire	4	1	3	3	43.565
Minor Counties North	4	0	4	0	78.200

==== Southern Group ====
Team	Pld	W	L	Pts	BowSR
Essex	4	4	0	12	30.275
Middlesex	4	2	2	6	35.294
Sussex	4	2	2	6	35.613
Kent	4	2	2	6	42.516
Minor Counties South	4	0	4	0	53.100

==== Western Group ====
Team	Pld	W	L	Pts	BowSR
Hampshire	4	4	0	12	31.200
Somerset	4	2	2	6	31.184
Surrey	4	2	2	6	40.000
Gloucestershire	4	1	3	3	45.444
Glamorgan	4	1	3	3	48.773

=== Quarter-finals ===
4 June 1975
(scorecard)

Hampshire; 223 all out (55 overs)	v	Somerset; 173 all out (45.3 overs)
David Turner 40; Ian Botham 3/56 (11 overs)		Viv Richards 62; Peter Sainsbury 3/29 (11 overs)

Hampshire won by 50 runs
County Ground, Southampton
Umpires: David Evans & Alan Whitehead
Player of the match: Peter Sainsbury (Hampshire)

4 June 1975
(scorecard)

Lancashire; 180/8 (55 overs)	v	Leicestershire; 183/8 (53.3 overs)
Frank Hayes 67; Ken Higgs 2/38 (11 overs)		Roger Tolchard 57*; Peter Lee 2/22 (10 overs)

Leicestershire won by 2 wickets
Grace Road, Leicester
Umpires: Cec Pepper & Dusty Rhodes
Player of the match: Roger Tolchard (Leicestershire)

4 June 1975
(scorecard)

Yorkshire; 182 all out (55 overs)	v	Middlesex; 183/6 (54.1 overs)
Geoff Boycott 58; Tim Lamb 5/44 (11 overs)		Norman Featherstone 38; Arnie Sidebottom 2/18 (11 overs)

Middlesex won by 4 wickets
Lord's, London
Umpires: Henry Horton & Barry Meyer
Player of the match: Clive Radley (Middlesex)

4 June 1975
(scorecard)

Essex; 153 all out (55 overs)	v	Warwickshire; 154/3 (37.5 overs)
Brian Edmeades 85; Steve Rouse 4/22 (7 overs)		Alvin Kallicharran 71*; Keith Boyce 2/40 (11 overs)

Warwickshire won by 7 wickets
Edgbaston, Birmingham
Umpires: Ron Aspinall & Eddie Phillipson
Player of the match: Steve Rouse (Warwickshire)

=== Semi-finals ===
2 July 1975
(scorecard)

Hampshire; 216 all out (53.4 overs)	v	Leicestershire; 217/5 (54.1 overs)
Gordon Greenidge 111; Peter Booth 3/27 (7 overs)		Chris Balderstone 101*; Andy Roberts 1/16 (10.1 overs)

Leicestershire won by 5 wickets
Grace Road, Leicester
Umpires: Jack Crapp & David Evans
Player of the match: Chris Balderstone (Leicestershire)

2 July 1975
(scorecard)

Middlesex; 247/8 (55 overs)	v	Warwickshire; 244/9 (55 overs)
Clive Radley 103; Steve Rouse 2/26 (10 overs)		John Jameson 65; John Price 3/38 (11 overs)

Middlesex won by 3 runs
Edgbaston, Birmingham
Umpires: Arthur Jepson & Ray Julian
Player of the match: Larry Gomes (Middlesex)

=== Final ===
19 July 1975
(scorecard)

Middlesex; 146 all out (52.4 overs)	v	Leicestershire; 150/5 (51.2 overs)
Michael Smith 83; Norman McVicker 4/20 (11 overs)		John Steele 49; Fred Titmus 2/30 (11 overs)

Leicestershire won by 5 wickets
Lord's, London
Umpires: Lloyd Budd & Arthur Fagg
Player of the match: Norman McVicker (Leicestershire)

== See also ==
Benson & Hedges Cup
