= Norman McVicker =

English cricketer (1940–2008)

Personal information
- Full name: Norman Michael McVicker
- Born: 4 November 1940; Whitefield, Lancashire, England
- Died: 19 November 2008 (aged 68); Cleethorpes, Lincolnshire, England
- Batting: Right-handed
- Bowling: Right-arm fast-medium

Domestic team information
- Years: Team
- 1963–1968: Lincolnshire
- 1965–1967: Minor Counties
- 1969–1973: Warwickshire
- 1974–1977: Leicestershire

Career statistics
Competition	First-class	List A
Matches	173	165
Runs scored	3,108	996
Batting average	19.79	15.32
100s/50s	–/13	–/–
Top score	83*	45
Balls bowled	24,259	7,193
Wickets	453	214
Bowling average	25.53	22.36
5 wickets in innings	19	3
10 wickets in match	–	–
Best bowling	7/29	5/19
Catches/stumpings	48/–	28/–
- Source: Cricinfo, 22 October 2011

Norman Michael McVicker (4 November 1940 – 19 November 2008) was an English cricketer. Having failed to establish himself with either Lancashire or Derbyshire, where he had trialled, McVicker initially played county cricket at minor counties cricket level for Lincolnshire. His performances in minor counties cricket were noticed by Warwickshire, who signed him at the age of 28 in 1969. He played five seasons with Warwickshire, winning the 1972 County Championship and taking 300 first-class wickets. He was released by Warwickshire at the end of the 1973 season and subsequently played for Leicestershire for three seasons from 1974–1976, winning both the County Championship and Benson & Hedges Cup in 1975. He retired at the end of the 1976 season, but came out of retirement in 1977 to play one-day cricket for Leicestershire, before retiring again at the end of that season.

== Early life and minor counties cricket ==
McVicker was born at Whitefield in Manchester, where he was educated at Stand Grammar School. He spent his childhood in Hamilton Road in Whitefield, where his house overlooked the cricket ground used by Stand Cricket Club. It was here where he developed his talent for cricket, aided by his family connection to the club.

Developing into a right-arm fast-medium bowling all-rounder, he found himself not being able secure a place in either of the Lancashire or Derbyshire sides of the early 1960s, instead opting to play minor counties cricket for Lincolnshire, debuting in the 1963 Minor Counties Championship. He first played first-class cricket in 1965, when he was selected to for the Minor Counties representative team against the touring South Africans at Jesmond. He played another first-class match for the team in 1967 against the touring Pakistanis at Swindon. He debuted in List A one-day cricket for Lincolnshire in the 1966 Gillette Cup against Hampshire. He played minor counties cricket for Lincolnshire until 1968, making 64 appearances in the Minor Counties Championship. His performances sufficiently impressed Warwickshire, who signed him in 1969 at the age of 28.

== First-class career ==
=== Warwickshire ===
McVicker debuted for Warwickshire in first-class cricket against Cambridge University. His first season was a success, with 74 first-class wickets at an average of 20.50, including what were to be his career-best first-class figures of 7 for 29 in his fifth County Championship match against Northamptonshire. He also played his first List A one-day match for Warwickshire in the 1969 Player's County League against Sussex. He suffered a loss of form in 1970, with 34 wickets at 42.91, though he remained consistent in one-day cricket, taking 21 wickets at 22.19. He regained his form in 1971, with 74 first-class wickets at 26.24.

McVicker was Warwickshire's leading wicket-taker in 1972, when they won the County Championship, with 66 wickets at 23.80. Of the 1972 Championship winning side, only McVicker and Stephen Rouse would not go on to play Test cricket. He lost his place in the side in 1973, despite taking 54 wickets at 24.53. He was released by Warwickshire at the end of that season. In first-class cricket, he played 104 matches for Warwickshire, scoring 1,701 runs with a high score of 65 not out, while with the ball he took 300 wickets at 25.77. In one-day cricket, he appeared 87 times for Warwickshire, taking 121 wickets at 22.33, with best figures of 5 for 26.

=== Leicestershire ===
Despite attracting interest from Middlesex and his native Lancashire, he opted to join Leicestershire in 1974. He debuted for Leicestershire against Cambridge University at Fenner's, with McVicker having a successful debut season with 61 first-class wickets at 22.24. He won both the County Championship and the Benson & Hedges Cup with Leicestershire in 1975, taking 4 for 20 in the final of the Benson & Hedges Cup against Middlesex at Lord's, which earned him the Gold Award for the match. He was particularly effective as a bowler in one-day cricket in 1975, taking 41 wickets at 16.29. He also took 45 first-class wickets in Leicestershire's Championship winning season, as well as scoring three back-to-back half centuries, which proved crucial to Leicestershire's Championship triumph. He retired after the 1976 season, in which he had taken 41 first-class wickets and 15 one-day wickets. Despite retiring, in July 1977 an injury-hit Leicestershire sent out an appeal to McVicker in the national press. McVicker, who was on holiday at the time answered the call and played seven one-day games in July and August. In first-class cricket, he played 67 matches for Leicestershire, scoring 1,364 runs with a high score of 83 not out, while with the ball he took 147 wickets at 24.43, with best figures of 6 for 19. In one-day cricket, he appeared 76 times for Leicestershire, taking 87 wickets at 22.77, with best figures of 5 for 19.

McVicker was one of ten members of Leicestershire's first County Championship winning team in 1975 to have a road in Leicester named after him by the city council. Chris Balderstone, Peter Booth, Brian Davison, Barry Dudleston, Ken Higgs, David Humphries, Ray Illingworth, John Steele and Roger Tolchard were the others. Jack Birkenshaw, Graham McKenzie and Mick Norman missed out as there were already roads using their surnames.

== Later life and death ==
McVicker died at Cleethorpes in Lincolnshire in November 2008. Prior to his death he had suffered from ill health, with his death attributed to a heart attack suffered during his sleep. He was survived by his wife, Rosemary.
