= 1999 Benson & Hedges Super Cup =

- Administrator(s): England and Wales Cricket Board
- Cricket format: Limited overs cricket (50 overs per innings)
- Champions: Gloucestershire (2nd title)
- Participants: 8
- Matches: 7
- Most runs: 161 Chris Adams (Sussex)
- Most wickets: 7 Ian Harvey (Gloucestershire); Jon Lewis (Gloucestershire); Craig White (Yorkshire)

The 1999 Benson & Hedges Super Cup was the twenty-eighth edition of cricket's Benson & Hedges Cup. The competition was won by Gloucestershire County Cricket Club.

== Background ==
The editor of Wisden, Matthew Engel, suggested in the 1995 edition that to liven up the county scene, the Benson & Hedges Cup be restricted to the top eight teams in the previous season's County Championship. This was partly to avoid the possibility of the division of the Championship into two divisions, while offering an incentive for mid-table counties to play positive cricket at the end of the season.

This also relieved some of the pressure on the cricket schedule in the 1999 season with the World Cup encroaching on the schedule.

The tournament was not a success, with low attendances. From 2000, the County Championship was divided into two divisions, and the Benson & Hedges Cup reverted to its prior format, albeit with non-first class teams excluded.

== Matches ==
=== Quarter-finals ===
25 June 1999
(scorecard)

Lancashire; 181/8 (50 overs)	v	Sussex; 182/6 (45 overs)
Graham Lloyd 45*; James Kirtley 3/42 (10 overs)		Chris Adams 73*; Peter Martin 3/36 (10 overs)

Sussex won by 4 wickets
Old Trafford, Manchester
Umpires: Vanburn Holder & John Steele
Player of the match: Chris Adams (Sussex)

25 June 1999
(scorecard)

Hampshire; 187/9 (50 overs)	v	Yorkshire; 188/1 (38.4 overs)
Jason Laney 41; Gavin Hamilton 2/21 (6 overs)		David Byas 104*; Nixon McLean 1/32 (7.4 overs)

Yorkshire won by 9 wickets
Headingley, Leeds
Umpires: John Harris & Nigel Plews
Player of the match: David Byas (Yorkshire)

26 June 1999
(scorecard)

Warwickshire; 229/5 (50 overs)	v	Leicestershire; 195 all out (47.1 overs)
Nick Knight 96; Michael Kasprowicz 2/36 (10 overs)		Darren Maddy 84; Ed Giddins 5/21 (10 overs)

Warwickshire won by 34 runs
Grace Road, Leicester
Umpires: Trevor Jesty & David Shepherd
Player of the match: Ed Giddins (Warwickshire)

27 June 1999
(scorecard)

Surrey; 220/9 (50 overs)	v	Gloucestershire; 222/3 (48 overs)
Graham Thorpe 84; Ian Harvey 4/42 (10 overs)		Kim Barnett 65; Alex Tudor 2/14 (9 overs)

Gloucestershire won by 7 wickets
County Ground, Bristol
Umpires: Graham Burgess & Mervyn Kitchen
Player of the match: Jack Russell (Gloucestershire)

=== Semi-finals ===
10 July 1999
(scorecard)

Yorkshire; 219/8 (50 overs)	v	Warwickshire; 163 all out (40.5 overs)
Craig White 55; Ashley Giles 3/35 (10 overs)		Dougie Brown 49; Michael Vaughan 2/30 (10 overs)

Yorkshire won by 56 runs
Edgbaston, Birmingham
Umpires: Chris Balderstone & John Holder
Player of the match: Craig White (Yorkshire)

11 July 1999
(scorecard)

Gloucestershire; 241 all out (49.5 overs)	v	Sussex; 217 all out (48.1 overs)
Jeremy Snape 50; Umer Rashid 2/38 (10 overs)		Chris Adams 88; Jon Lewis 3/37 (10 overs)

Gloucestershire won by 24 runs
County Ground, Bristol
Umpires: Barry Dudleston & Ken Palmer
Player of the match: Jeremy Snape (Gloucestershire)

=== Final ===
1 August 1999
(scorecard)

Gloucestershire; 291/9 (50 overs)	v	Yorkshire; 167 all out (40 overs)
Mark Alleyne 112; Craig White 4/51 (10 overs)		Craig White 38; Jon Lewis 3/32 (5 overs)

Gloucestershire won by 124 runs
Lord's, London
Umpires: Ray Julian & Peter Willey
Player of the match: Mark Alleyne (Gloucestershire)

== See also ==
- Benson & Hedges Cup
