= David Humphries =

English cricketer (1953–2020)

Personal information
- Full name: David John Humphries
- Born: 6 August 1953; Alveley, Shropshire, England
- Died: 15 July 2020 (aged 66)
- Batting: Left-handed
- Role: Wicket-keeper
- Relatives: Mark Humphries (brother)

Domestic team information
- Years: Team
- 1971–1973: Shropshire
- 1974–1976: Leicestershire
- 1977–1984: Worcestershire

Career statistics
Competition	First-class	List A
Matches	175	167
Runs scored	5,116	1,639
Batting average	24.83	14.25
100s/50s	4/26	0/3
Top score	133*	62
Catches/stumpings	294/60	138/35
- Source: CricInfo, 16 July 2020

David John Humphries (6 August 1953 – 15 July 2020) was an English cricketer. He was born in Alveley, Shropshire, and educated at Bridgnorth Olbury Wells School and Wulfrun College, Wolverhampton.

Humphries played county cricket for Leicestershire and Worcestershire, being capped by Worcestershire in 1978. He had also played for Shropshire between 1971 and 1973, being capped in the latter year, while playing at club level for West Bromwich Dartmouth. He appeared Shropshire's only Minor Counties Championship win, against Staffordshire at London Road, Shrewsbury in 1973, when he was the highest scorer on his side at 53 runs during the first innings.

His brother Mark Humphries, also a wicket-keeper, played for Minor Counties and Staffordshire.

Humphries died after a long illness on 15 July 2020 at the age of 66.

Humphries was one of ten members of Leicestershire's first County Championship winning team in 1975 to have a road in Leicester named after him by the city council. Chris Balderstone, Peter Booth, Brian Davison, Barry Dudleston, Ken Higgs, Ray Illingworth, Norman McVicker, John Steele and Roger Tolchard were the others. Jack Birkenshaw, Graham McKenzie and Mick Norman missed out as there were already roads using their surnames.
