= 1998 Benson & Hedges Cup =

- Administrator: England and Wales Cricket Board
- Cricket format: Limited overs cricket (50 overs per innings)
- Champions: Essex (2nd title)
- Participants: 22
- Matches: 57
- Most runs: 629 Darren Maddy (Leicestershire)
- Most wickets: 13 Glen Chapple (Lancashire); Richard Johnson (Middlesex); Alan Mullally (Leicestershire); Ben Hollioake (Surrey)

The 1998 Benson & Hedges Cup was the twenty-seventh edition of cricket's Benson & Hedges Cup. It was an English limited overs county cricket tournament which was held between 28 April and 12 July 1998.

It had been agreed at various meetings of the ECB in September 1997 that, due to restrictions on tobacco advertising and a desire to reduce the amount of one-day cricket played, that this would be the final Benson & Hedges Cup, but that henceforth a Super Cup would be played for between the top eight teams in the previous year's County Championship. The editor of Wisden, Matthew Engel, had suggested such a move in the 1995 edition in order to liven up the county scene.

The Super Cup was competed for in 1999 but was abandoned and the zonal system resumed for the 2000 competition. The revision to the system meant that 1998 was the last appearance in the Benson & Hedges Cup of the Minor Counties, the British Universities, Scotland and Ireland.

The competition was won by Essex County Cricket Club for the second time, defeating Leicestershire County Cricket Club by 192 runs in the final at Lord's on 11 and 12 July 1998.

== Fixtures and results ==
=== Group stage ===
==== Group A ====
Team	Pld	W	L	NR	A	Pts	NRRA100
Leicestershire	5	4	1	0	0	8	23.324
Lancashire	5	4	1	0	0	8	17.313
Warwickshire	5	4	1	0	0	8	16.358
Nottinghamshire	5	2	3	0	0	4	1.519
Northamptonshire	5	1	4	0	0	2	-10.406
Minor Counties	5	0	5	0	0	0	-50.577

==== Group B ====
Team	Pld	W	L	NR	A	Pts	NRRA100
Yorkshire	4	4	0	0	0	8	13.134
Durham	4	3	1	0	0	6	-1.427
Worcestershire	4	2	2	0	0	4	3.666
Derbyshire	4	1	2	0	1	3	-3.277
Scotland	4	0	3	0	1	1	-10.520

==== Group C ====
Team	Pld	W	L	NR	A	Pts	NRRA100
Surrey	5	5	0	0	0	10	13.168
Kent	5	3	1	0	1	7	14.171
Somerset	5	2	2	0	1	5	0.558
Gloucestershire	5	2	3	0	0	4	2.890
British Universities	5	1	4	0	0	2	-12.823
Hampshire	5	1	4	0	0	2	-15.563

==== Group D ====
Team	Pld	W	L	NR	A	Pts	NRRA100
Middlesex	4	4	0	0	0	8	3.716
Essex	4	2	1	1	0	5	19.485
Glamorgan	4	1	2	1	0	3	10.333
Sussex	4	1	2	0	1	3	-1.533
Ireland	4	0	3	0	1	1	-33.294

=== Quarter-finals ===
27 May 1998
(scorecard)

Kent; 158 all out (45.1 overs)	v	Leicestershire; 159/2 (37.2 overs)
Carl Hooper 60; Phil Simmons 5/33 (9.1 overs)		Darren Maddy 93*; Mark Ealham 2/32 (10 overs)

Leicestershire won by 8 wickets
Grace Road, Leicester
Umpires: Barry Dudleston & Bob White
Player of the match: Darren Maddy (Leicestershire)

27, 28 May 1998
(scorecard)

Essex; 232/9 (50 overs)	v	Middlesex; 224/7 (50 overs)
Stephen Peters 58*; Richard Johnson 3/40 (10 overs)		Justin Langer 71; Ashley Cowan 5/28 (10 overs)

Essex won by 8 runs
Lord's, London
Umpires: Tony Clarkson & Roy Palmer
Player of the match: Ashley Cowan (Essex)

- Reserve day used. Essex were 232/9 at the close of the first day's play.

27, 28 May 1998
(scorecard)

Lancashire; 203 all out (49.4 overs)	v	Surrey; 206/5 (45.4 overs)
Mike Atherton 93; Saqlain Mushtaq 4/46 (9.4 overs)		Ali Brown 41; Gary Yates 2/35 (10 overs)

Surrey won by 5 wickets
The Foster's Oval, London
Umpires: David Shepherd & Alan Whitehead
Player of the match: Mike Atherton (Lancashire)

- Reserve day used. Surrey were 35/0 at the close of the first day's play.

27 May 1998
(scorecard)

Yorkshire; 269/5 (50 overs)	v	Durham; 167 all out (39 overs)
Darren Lehmann 119; Melvyn Betts 2/44 (10 overs)		Paul Collingwood 39; Gavin Hamilton 2/17 (6 overs)

Yorkshire won by 102 runs
Headingley Cricket Ground, Leeds
Umpires: John Harris & Pasty Harris
Player of the match: Darren Lehmann (Yorkshire)

=== Semi-finals ===
9 June 1998
(scorecard)

Leicestershire; 311/4 (50 overs)	v	Surrey; 291/8 (50 overs)
Darren Maddy 120*; Saqlain Mushtaq 1/46 (10 overs)		Adam Hollioake 85; Chris Lewis 4/40 (10 overs)

Leicestershire won by 20 runs
Grace Road, Leicester
Umpires: David Constant & John Hampshire
Player of the match: Darren Maddy (Leicestershire)

9 June 1998
(scorecard)

Essex; 258/7 (50 overs)	v	Yorkshire; 163 all out (42.4 overs)
Nasser Hussain 78; Ryan Sidebottom 2/42 (10 overs)		Darren Lehmann 40; Paul Grayson 3/32 (8 overs)

Essex won by 95 runs
Headingley Cricket Ground, Leeds
Umpires: Barrie Leadbeater & Peter Willey
Player of the match: Nasser Hussain (Essex)

=== Final ===
11, 12 July 1998
(scorecard)

Essex; 268/7 (50 overs)	v	Leicestershire; 76 all out (27.4 overs)
Paul Prichard 92; Alan Mullally 3/36 (10 overs)		Paul Nixon 21; Mark Ilott 3/10 (8 overs)

Essex won by 192 runs
Lord's, London
Umpires: Ray Julian & Mervyn Kitchen
Player of the match: Paul Prichard (Essex)

- Reserve day used. Essex were 268/7 (50 overs) at the close of the first day's play.

== See also ==
Benson & Hedges Cup
