= Tolchard =

Tolchard is a surname. Notable people with the surname include:

- Jeffrey Tolchard (born 1944), English cricketer and footballer
- Ray Tolchard (1953–2004), English cricketer
- Roger Tolchard (born 1946), English cricketer
- Sam Tolchard (born 1989), English lawn and indoor bowler
- Sophie Tolchard (born 1991), English lawn bowler
