= Peter Booth (cricketer) =

English cricketer (born 1952)

Personal information
- Born: 2 November 1952 (age 74); Shipley, Yorkshire, England
- Batting: Right-handed
- Bowling: Right-arm fast-medium

Domestic team information
- Years: Team
- 1972–1981: Leicestershire

Career statistics
Competition	First-class	List A
Matches	90	123
Runs scored	767	365
Batting average	13.00	10.13
100s/50s	0/2	0/0
Top score	58*	40*
Balls bowled	8,874	5,058
Wickets	162	135
Bowling average	28.08	25.43
5 wickets in innings	1	1
10 wickets in match	0	–
Best bowling	6/93	5/33
Catches/stumpings	27/–	24/–
- Source: Cricinfo, 10 March 2024

Peter Booth (born 2 November 1952) is an English former cricketer who played for Leicestershire from 1972 to 1981. He appeared in 90 first-class matches as a right-arm fast-medium bowler and right-handed lower-order batsman.

He scored 767 runs: his highest score was 58 not out to save a match against Lancashire at Leicester in 1976. He took 162 wickets with a best performance of six for 93.

Booth was one of ten members of Leicestershire's first County Championship winning team in 1975 to have a road in Leicester named after him by the city council. Chris Balderstone, Brian Davison, Barry Dudleston, Ken Higgs, David Humphries, Ray Illingworth, Norman McVicker, John Steele and Roger Tolchard were the others. Jack Birkenshaw, Graham McKenzie and Mick Norman missed out as there were already roads using their surnames.
