= Twose =

Twose is a surname. Notable people with the surname include:

- Luis Antonio Twose (born 1950), Spanish field hockey player
- Richard Twose (born 1963), English cricketer
- Roger Twose (born 1968), New Zealand cricketer
