= Brian Davison (cricketer) =

Australian politician

Personal information
- Full name: Brian Fettes Davison
- Born: 21 December 1946 (age 79); Bulawayo, Matabeleland, Southern Rhodesia
- Batting: Right-handed
- Bowling: Right-arm medium/Off break
- Role: Batsman

Domestic team information
- Years: Team
- 1967-68–1979-80: Rhodesia
- 1970–1983: Leicestershire
- 1985: Gloucestershire
- 1979-80–1987-88: Tasmania

Career statistics
Competition	FC	List A
Matches	467	334
Runs scored	27,453	8,343
Batting average	39.96	31.24
100s/50s	53/148	7/46
Top score	189	158*
Balls bowled		1,802
Wickets	82	54
Bowling average	32.78	25.22
5 wickets in innings	1	0
10 wickets in match	0	n/a
Best bowling	5/52	4/29
Catches/stumpings	338/–	80/–
- Source: Cricinfo.com, 4 December 2008

Brian Fettes Davison (born 21 December 1946) is a former cricketer who played 467 first-class matches for Rhodesia, Gloucestershire, Leicestershire and Tasmania, and former member of the Tasmanian House of Assembly.

Described as "an aggressive, fast-scoring right-handed batsman", Davison was also a useful right-arm medium-pace bowler and an outstanding fielder who captained Rhodesia in 25 matches.

== Early life ==
Born in Bulawayo in what was then Rhodesia, Davison attended Gifford Technical High School in Bulawayo, where his sporting skills were first evident (he also represented Rhodesia in field hockey). Davison made his first-class debut for Rhodesia on 25 November 1967, against Natal B in Salisbury, scoring 47. Davison soon attracted the attention of English county club Northamptonshire, playing for their Second XI in 1969 before switching to rival club Leicestershire in 1970.

== First-class cricket career ==
Through the 1970s, Davison played for Leicestershire and Rhodesia, serving as captain of both, won the 1971 Walter Lawrence Trophy for a 63-minute century, named the South African Cricket Annual Cricketer of the Year in 1973 and led Rhodesia to their first major South African trophy, scoring an unbeaten 102 at the 1977/78 Datsun Shield final. With Leicestershire, Davison won the County Championship in 1975, the John Player League twice and the Benson & Hedges Cup twice.

Davison was enticed to captain Tasmania in 1979/80 and transferred from Leicestershire to rival county side Gloucestershire for the 1985 season. His leadership of a Tasmanian team newly inducted into the Sheffield Shield proved crucial to an inexperienced side and he continued to alternate between Leicestershire and Tasmania until his retirement from first-class cricket at the conclusion of the 1987/88 Australian domestic season.

Davison scored 27,453 first-class runs, with 53 centuries, which remained the most by any Rhodesian or Zimbabwean until surpassed by Graeme Hick. 37 of his centuries were for Leicestershire, the second most by any Leicestershire player, while his 18,537 runs for Leicestershire puts him ninth of their all-time highest run-scorer list.

Davison was also a successful one day player, making 8343 List A runs, including 6744 for Leicestershire (bettered by only four other Leicestershire players). This included an unbeaten 158 in 1972, which remained the highest List A score for the county until 1996, and at the time the highest score for any one day competition in the world.

Davison was one of ten members of Leicestershire's first County Championship winning team in 1975 to have a road in Leicester named after him by the city council. Chris Balderstone, Peter Booth, Barry Dudleston, Ken Higgs, David Humphries, Ray Illingworth, Norman McVicker, John Steele and Roger Tolchard were the others. Jack Birkenshaw, Graham McKenzie and Mick Norman missed out as there were already roads using their surnames.

== Later life ==
Following his retirement from cricket, Davison remained in Tasmania and was elected as a Liberal representative to the Tasmanian House of Assembly Division of Franklin in 1990, where he served until his defeat at the 1996 election. A keen golfer, he is a member of the Iron Pot Golf Club

== See also ==
- List of Tasmanian representative cricketers

Sporting positions
Preceded by Jack Simmons	Tasmanian First-class cricket captains 1979/80–87/88	Succeeded by David Boon
Preceded by Jack Simmons	Tasmanian One-day cricket captains 1979/80–87/88	Succeeded by Roger Woolley
