= Roger Tolchard =

English cricketer

Personal information
- Full name: Roger William Tolchard
- Born: 15 June 1946 (age 80); Torquay, Devon, England
- Batting: Right-handed
- Bowling: Right-arm offbreak
- Role: Wicket-keeper
- Relatives: Jeff Tolchard (brother); Ray Tolchard (brother); Roger Twose (nephew); Richard Twose (nephew); Sam Tolchard (nephew); Sophie Tolchard (niece)

Career statistics
Competition	Test	ODI	FC	LA
Matches	4	1	483	310
Runs scored	129	–	15,288	6,055
Batting average	25.80	–	31.13	27.64
100s/50s	0/1	–	12/86	2/28
Top score	67	–	126*	103
Balls bowled	–	–	48	–
Wickets	–	–	1	–
Bowling average	–	–	34.00	–
5 wickets in innings	–	–	0	–
10 wickets in match	–	–	0	–
Best bowling	–	–	1/4	–
Catches/stumpings	5/0	1/–	914/127	248/34
- Source: CricInfo, 1 January 2006

Roger William Tolchard (born 15 June 1946) is an English former cricketer, who played in four Tests and one One Day International for England in the late 1970s.

== Life and career ==
Tolchard was a wicket-keeper. Educated at Malvern College, he played for Leicestershire for his entire professional career, from 1965 to 1983.

He was selected for the England team for their tour of India in 1976–77, and played in four Tests, although as a specialist batsman not a wicket-keeper (Alan Knott was the established wicket-keeper). He scored an important 67 in his first innings, but only managed 62 in total in six further innings.

He was also selected for the 1978–79 tour of Australia. He kept wicket in a One Day International in Sydney, although it was rained off after 7.2 overs. He was forced to return home injured with a fractured cheekbone before the remainder of the one day matches.

He captained Leicestershire for the last three years of his career, from 1981 to 1983, leading them to second place in the County Championship in the 1982 season.

After retiring as a professional player, he returned to Malvern College where he coached cricket and rackets from 1984 to 2006.

His brother Jeff also played for Leicestershire, and his nephew Roger Twose played for New Zealand. England international lawn bowlers Sam and Sophie Tolchard are his nephew and niece.

Tolchard was one of ten members of Leicestershire's first County Championship winning team in 1975 to have a road in Leicester named after him by the city council. Chris Balderstone, Peter Booth, Brian Davison, Barry Dudleston, Ken Higgs, David Humphries, Ray Illingworth, Norman McVicker, and John Steele were the others. Jack Birkenshaw, Graham McKenzie and Mick Norman missed out as there were already roads using their surnames.
