= Ken Higgs =

English cricketer (1937–2016)

Personal information
- Full name: Kenneth Higgs
- Born: 14 January 1937; Kidsgrove, Staffordshire, England
- Died: 7 September 2016 (aged 79)
- Batting: Left-handed
- Bowling: Right-arm fast-medium

International information
- National side: England
- Test debut: 26 August 1965 v South Africa
- Last Test: 11 June 1968 v Australia

Career statistics
Competition	Test	First-class	LA
Matches	15	511	246
Runs scored	185	3,648	300
Batting average	11.56	11.29	10.34
100s/50s	0/1	0/3	0/0
Top score	63	98	25
Balls bowled	4,112	89,431	12,017
Wickets	71	1,536	355
Bowling average	20.74	23.61	18.96
5 wickets in innings	2	50	4
10 wickets in match	0	5	0
Best bowling	6/91	7/19	6/17
Catches/stumpings	4/–	311/–	84/–
- Source: CricketArchive, 30 December 2021

Kenneth Higgs (14 January 1937 – 7 September 2016) was an English fast-medium bowler, who was most successful as the opening partner to Brian Statham with Lancashire in the 1960s. He later played with success for Leicestershire.

Cricket writer Colin Bateman noted, "Higgs was a fine medium-fast bowler with an impressive pedigree, who suddenly went out of fashion with the selectors after one Test of the 1968 Ashes series".

== Early life and career ==
In his junior days, concentrating on football with Port Vale, Higgs did not take seriously to cricket until his late teens. He was signed to the club from July 1954 to 1959, but never made a first-team appearance. He also represented England Youth. Making progress during military service, he began playing for his native county, Staffordshire, taking 46 wickets for 13.13 each in 1957. Jack Ikin, a Staffordshire native, recommended Higgs to Lancashire, and he began playing for them in 1958.

== Lancashire ==
Higgs caused instant notice, taking 7 for 36 against Hampshire in his first County Championship match. He took over 100 wickets in each season from 1959 to 1960 but was one of the few cricketers to take 100 wickets in a season at over thirty runs each in 1961, and he ceased to be an automatic choice.

In 1965, on a wet summer, he took 102 wickets in County Championship matches and formed a formidable partnership with Statham. His best performance was 7 for 19 against Leicestershire. He was selected for the last Test at The Oval. He took 8 for 143 against a formidable South African batting line-up and was selected for MCC tour of Australia in 1965-66, where he had a modest time but took 17 wickets (9.24) in three Tests in New Zealand.

== Test selection ==
In 1966, against the West Indies, Higgs established himself as England's first-choice opening bowler with 24 wickets for under 26 runs. At the Oval, Higgs, only a tail-end left-hand batsman, made 63, then his highest first-class score and helped England recover from 166 for 7 to 527 all out. His partnership with John Snow for the tenth wicket of 128 was a record for England at home. It also was the all-time Test match record partnership between batsmen 10 and 11.

Despite injury keeping him out of two Tests against India, Higgs had a good season in 1967, taking 95 wickets at 16.92. He was named one of the Cricketers of the Year by Wisden. That year, he took 17 wickets in the Test series against Pakistan. Despite this, he did not play in England's next Test series, their tour to the West Indies. He was later selected for one match of the Ashes series the following year but was never selected again. According to the cricket writer Peter Mason, Higgs "was entitled to wonder why he had not been picked more often for his country". Higgs retired from County cricket at the end of the 1969 season, and played for Rishton in the Lancashire League. In the twelve seasons for Lancashire Higgs took 1,033 wickets, a figure which only eight players had then exceeded.

== Second career with Leicestershire ==
After two years in the Lancashire League, the Leicestershire captain, Ray Illingworth, called Higgs out of first-class cricket retirement because of Graham McKenzie's expected unavailability with the 1972 Australians. Higgs played regularly until the end of the 1979 season, for which he was appointed captain. He was the fifth-highest Englishman in the bowling averages that season at forty-two. In one-day cricket, Higgs played in Leicestershire's 1972 and 1975 successes in the Benson & Hedges Cup, also taking a hat-trick in the unsuccessful 1974 final. He was also part of Leicestershire's County Championship-winning side in 1975. Higgs took 308 List 'A' wickets for his adopted county. On his day, he was also a solid and reliable tail-end batsman who scored over 300 runs in a season six times. His highest first-class score of 98 was part of Leicestershire's record 228-run last-wicket partnership with Ray Illingworth against Northamptonshire in 1977.

After 1979, Higgs seldom played first-class cricket, and he retired from one-day cricket after 1982. In 1986, he returned at the age of 49, taking 5 for 22 against Yorkshire. He played once more against Somerset, without taking a wicket. He took 100 wickets in a season five times and over 90 twice. He took 42 List-A wickets in both 1975 and 1977.

Higgs was one of ten members of Leicestershire's first County Championship-winning team in 1975, and he had a road named after him by the city council in Leicester. Chris Balderstone, Peter Booth, Brian Davison, Barry Dudleston, David Humphries, Ray Illingworth, Norman McVicker, John Steele and Roger Tolchard were the others. Jack Birkenshaw, Graham McKenzie and Mick Norman missed out as there were already roads using their surnames.

== Coaching career ==
Higgs later coached both Leicestershire and Nottinghamshire. He also umpired several Second XI fixtures.
