= Jeffrey Tolchard =

English cricketer and footballer

Personal information
- Full name: Jeffrey Graham Tolchard
- Born: 7 March 1944 (age 82); Torquay, Devon, England
- Batting: Right-handed
- Bowling: Right-arm medium
- Role: Occasional wicket-keeper
- Relatives: Roger Tolchard (brother); Ray Tolchard (brother); Roger Twose (nephew); Richard Twose (nephew); Sam Tolchard (nephew); Sophie Tolchard (niece)

Domestic team information
- Years: Team
- 1963–1969: Devon
- 1970–1977: Leicestershire
- 1979–1983: Devon
- 1980–1983: Minor Counties

Career statistics
Competition	First-class	List A
Matches	78	57
Runs scored	1,865	657
Batting average	20.27	19.32
100s/50s	0/9	0/1
Top score	78	54
Catches/stumpings	24/–	14/–
- Source: Cricinfo, 25 March 2011

Jeffrey Graham Tolchard (born 17 March 1944) is an English former cricketer and footballer. Tolchard was a right-handed batsman who bowled right-arm medium pace and who occasionally kept wicket. As a footballer, Tolchard played for Torquay United, Exeter City and Loughborough. He was born in Torquay, Devon.

== Cricket career ==
Tolchard made his debut for Devon in the 1963 Minor Counties Championship against Oxfordshire. He played Minor counties matches for Devon until 1969. His debut in List A cricket came in Devon's first List A match in the 1969 Gillette Cup against Hertfordshire.

After playing for the Leicestershire Second XI for a number of seasons, Tolchard made his first-class debut for Leicestershire in the 1970 County Championship against Yorkshire. His List A debut for Leicestershire also came in 1970 against Hampshire in the 1970 John Player League. Tolchard played 77 first-class matches and 40 List A matches until the end of the 1977 season, which was his final season with Leicestershire. His first-class batting records for Leicestershire were those of a somewhat inconsistent batsman; he did not average above 30 in any of his 7 seasons with Leicestershire, with his final season in 1977 yielding his highest season average of 28.62. In his seven seasons with Leicestershire, he scored 1,863 runs at an average of 20.25, with nine half centuries and a high score of 78. In List A cricket, he scored 349 runs at an average of 20.52, with a high score of 46*.

Following his departure from Leicestershire, Tolchard rejoined his native county of Devon for the 1978 season. Two seasons later, in 1980, he played for the Minor Counties cricket team in the 1980 Benson & Hedges Cup, playing twelve List A matches for the team up to 1983. He also represented the Minor Counties in a single first-class match in 1981 against the touring Sri Lankans. Tolchard opened the batting in the Minor Counties first-innings, scoring 2 runs before having to retire hurt. He continued to represent Devon in Minor Counties cricket, even playing a single MCCA Knockout Trophy match in 1983 against Buckinghamshire in 1983. His final Minor Counties Championship match had come in the previous season, although his final List A match did come in 1983, in a NatWest Trophy match against his former county.

== Football career ==
Jeffrey Tolchard
Personal information
- Position: Winger

Senior career*
Years	Team	Apps	(Gls)
1963–1965	Torquay United	11	(4)
1965–1966	Exeter City	1	(0)
- Loughborough United
- * Club domestic league appearances and goals

A winger, Tolchard played football for Torquay United (1963–1965), Exeter City (1965–1966) and Loughborough United.

== Personal life ==
Tolchard has been described as coming from a sports mad family. His brother, Roger, played Test cricket for England and his youngest brother, Ray, had a List A career with Devon. Tolchard's nephew, Roger Twose, played Test and One Day International cricket for New Zealand, having emigrated there. Richard Twose, also his nephew, played for Devon. Ray's son Sam Tolchard plays lawn bowls for England and represented England in the 2010 Commonwealth Games. His daughter Sophie Tolchard, sister of Sam, is also an international lawn bowler.
