= Ray Tolchard =

English cricketer and umpire

Personal information
- Full name: Raymond Charles Tolchard
- Born: 13 October 1953; Torquay, Devon, England
- Died: 31 July 2004 (aged 50); Marldon, Devon, England
- Batting: Left-handed
- Role: Umpire
- Relatives: Roger Tolchard (brother); Jeffrey Tolchard (brother); Roger Twose (nephew); Richard Twose (nephew); Sam Tolchard (son); Sophie Tolchard (daughter)

Domestic team information
- Years: Team
- 1975–1984: Devon
- 1979: Minor Counties South

Career statistics
Competition	List A
Matches	10
Runs scored	92
Batting average	13.14
100s/50s	0/0
Top score	40
Catches/stumpings	0/–
- Source: Cricinfo, 12 February 2011

Raymond Charles Tolchard (13 October 1953 – 31 July 2004) was an English cricketer and umpire. Tolchard was a right-handed batsman. He was born in Torquay, Devon.

== Cricket career ==
Tolchard made his debut for Devon in the 1975 Minor Counties Championship against Cornwall. From 1975 to 1984, he represented the county in 84 Championship matches, the last of which came against Buckinghamshire. Tolchard captained the county in a number of Minor Counties matches. In the 1978 Minor Counties Championship final, he helped Devon to their maiden Championship by scoring a century off 356 balls. He also represented Devon in 3 MCCA Knockout Trophy matches between from 1983 to 1984. Tolchard played List A cricket for Devon, at a time when they were permitted to take part in the domestic one-day competition, making his debut against Staffordshire in the 1978 Gillette Cup 1st round. The following season he played 4 List A matches for Minor Counties South in the 1979 Benson & Hedges Cup. In that same season he played a List A match for Devon against Leicestershire in the 1979 Gillette Cup. He played three further List A matches for Devon, the last of which came against Sussex in the 1984 NatWest Trophy. In total, he played 10 List A matches, scoring just 92 runs at a batting average of 13.14, with a high score of 42.

He also played a number of Second XI fixtures for the Leicestershire Second XI between 1970 and 1978. In 1988, Tolchard was included on the first-class umpires list, standing in his first first-class match which was played between Oxford University and Kent. He stood in 40 first-class matches between 1988 and 1992, as well as standing in 35 List A matches between 1990 and 1992.

== Personal life ==
In his latter years, Tolchard struggled with Motor neurone disease, which claimed his life on 31 July 2004 at Marldon, Devon. Tolchard came from a well known cricketing family; his brother Roger played Test and One Day International cricket for England. His eldest brother, Jeffrey, played first-class cricket for Leicestershire and football for Torquay United and Exeter City. His extended family included his nephews Roger Twose, who played Test and One Day International cricket for New Zealand, and Richard Twose who played for Devon. Ray Tolchard's son, Sam Tolchard, competes in bowls and has won seven titles at the English national bowls championships and represented England at the Commonwealth Games in 2014, 2018 and 2022. His daughter Sophie Tolchard is also an international lawn bowler.
