= Eric MacKenzie =

Eric MacKenzie may refer to:

- Eric MacKenzie (politician) (born 1938), politician in New Brunswick, Canada
- Eric Francis MacKenzie (1893–1969), Roman Catholic bishop
- Eric Mackenzie (footballer) (born 1988), Australian rules footballer for West Coast Eagles
- Eric Mackenzie (baseball) (born 1932), retired Canadian Major League baseball player
- Eric McKenzie (1910–1994), Australian cricketer
- Eric McKenzie (cyclist) (born 1958), New Zealand cyclist
