= Richard Twose =

English cricketer

Richard Twose (born 10 January 1963) is an English former cricketer. He was a left-handed batsman who played for Devon. He was born in Torquay.

Twose, who made his debut for Devon in the Minor Counties Championship in 1985, made his only List A appearance in the 1988 NatWest Trophy, against Nottinghamshire. He scored a single run in the match, and conceded 14 runs from a single over of bowling.

Twose's brother, Roger, played Test cricket for New Zealand, his uncle, Roger Tolchard, played Test cricket for England, and his uncles Jeffrey and Ray, played first-class and List A cricket for Leicestershire and Devon respectively.
