= Douglas McKenzie =

Australian cricketer

Personal information
- Full name: Douglas Charles McKenzie
- Born: 15 March 1906; Kew, Victoria, Australia
- Died: 1 July 1979 (aged 73); Perth, Western Australia
- Batting: Right-handed
- Role: Batsman
- Relatives: Eric McKenzie (brother); Graham McKenzie (nephew)

Domestic team information
- Years: Team
- 1934/35–1945/46: Western Australia
- FC debut: 9 March 1935 Western Australia v New South Wales
- Last FC: 24 December 1945 Western Australia v Australian Services

Career statistics
Competition	First-class
Matches	4
Runs scored	214
Batting average	35.66
100s/50s	0/3
Top score	88
Catches/stumpings	1/0
- Source: CricketArchive, 7 November 2011

Douglas Charles McKenzie (15 March 1906 – 1 July 1979) was an Australian cricketer.

A right-handed batsman, McKenzie represented Western Australia in four first-class matches between 1934/1935 and 1945/1946. He also played in grade cricket.

His brother Eric and nephew Graham also played first-class cricket for Western Australia.
