= Mark Humphries =

English cricketer (born 1965)

Personal information
- Full name: Mark Ian Humphries
- Born: 4 October 1965 (age 61); Highley, Shropshire, England
- Nickname: Humpty
- Batting: Left-handed
- Role: Wicket-keeper
- Relatives: David Humphries (brother)

Domestic team information
- Years: Team
- 1990–2003: Staffordshire
- 1992–1995: Minor Counties

Career statistics
Competition	First-class	List A
Matches	1	26
Runs scored	0	307
Batting average	0.00	19.18
100s/50s	0/0	0/0
Top score	0	41*
Catches/stumpings	3/–	24/2
- Source: Cricinfo, 20 June 2011

Mark Ian Humphries (born 4 October 1965) is a former English cricketer. Humphries was a left-handed batsman who fielded as a wicket-keeper. He was born in Highley, Shropshire.

Humphries made his debut for Staffordshire in the 1990 Minor Counties Championship against Northumberland. Humphries played Minor counties cricket for Staffordshire from 1990 to 2003, which included 115 Minor Counties Championship matches and 41 MCCA Knockout Trophy. Humphries made 114 consecutive appearances in the Minor Counties Championship, which is a Staffordshire record. He also played every MCCA Knockout Trophy fixture during that period. In 1990, he made his List A debut against Northamptonshire in the NatWest Trophy. He played 17 further List A matches for Staffordshire, the last coming against Surrey in the 2003 Cheltenham & Gloucester Trophy. In his 18 matches for the county, he scored 183 runs at an average of 18.30, with a high score of 41 not out. This score came against the Durham Cricket Board in the 1999 NatWest Trophy. As a wicket-keeper, Humphries took 18 catches behind the stumps and made a single stumping.

Humphries also played List A cricket for the Minor Counties cricket team, making his debut for the team against Leicestershire in the 1992 Benson & Hedges Cup. He played 7 further matches for the team, the last coming in the 1995 Benson & Hedges Cup against Warwickshire. In his 8 List A matches for the team, Humphries scored 124 runs at an average of 20.66, with a high score of 27. Behind the stumps he took 6 catches and made a single stumping. It was for the Minor Counties that he made his only first-class appearance for in 1994 against the touring South Africans. Not required to bat in Minor Counties first-innings, he was later run out for a duck in their second-innings. He did however take 3 catches in the match.

His brother, David, played first-class cricket for Leicestershire and Worcestershire.
