= Paul Prichard =

English cricketer and coach

Paul Prichard (born 7 January 1965) is an English cricket coach and retired cricketer.

A former Dorset coach, he has joined the Hampshire coaching staff for the 2022 season. He will also lead the Southern Vipers.

He played for Essex as a right-handed batsman and a right-arm medium-pace bowler for seventeen years. He was club captain from 1995 to 1998 before spending the last three years of his playing career at Berkshire.

Prichard first played for Essex Schools at the age of nine, and was nurtured at the Hutton club by his father, a prominent Hutton player, and Doug Pont. He graduated from the Essex Schools sides to England Schools, and moved to the more prominent Orsett and Thurrock club.

He played in five Youth Test Matches and 4 Youth One-Day Internationals between 1981 and 1983. His first Test for England Young Cricketers against India alongside team-mates such as Steve O'Shaughnessy and Tim Boon. As a schoolboy he was a decent wicket-keeper, but it was as a batsman that he excelled, although his fielding also won him much praise.

On the Essex staff from the age of 16, his first team debut came in 1982, when he played in a 40-over League match, however, he neither batted or bowled during this match, batting lower down the order than was required, and not being called in to bowl at any time. He competed in the Benson and Hedges Cup for the next twelve years, and later in his career in the C&G trophy. ESPNCricinfo suggests that he was predicted for full England honours, but an England call never came.

His maiden first-class century came in his debut year, 1984, at Old Trafford against Lancashire. This was a momentous occasion since Essex's victory in the match, combined with Nottinghamshire's very narrow defeat in the simultaneous fixture against Somerset, clinched the first of four County Championship triumphs (the others coming in 1986, 1991 and 1992) for Essex in which Prichard was involved. He also shared a number of one-day triumphs with Essex, including in the 1998 Benson & Hedges Cup when he was man of the match and victorious captain in the final. He was also man of the match when Essex won the final of the 1989 Refuge Assurance Cup.

He won his Essex cap in 1986, was the club captain 1995–98, and was awarded a benefit year in 1996.

For some years he played grade cricket in Australia and coached at the Chelmsford Indoor School.

He played in the Minor Counties Championship Western Division extensively between 2002 and 2006, for Berkshire.

== Sources ==
- David Lemmon, The Book of Essex Cricketers (1994, Breedon Books)
