= Chris Balderstone =

English sportsman

Personal information
- Full name: John Christopher Balderstone
- Date of birth: 16 November 1940
- Place of birth: Huddersfield, England
- Date of death: 6 March 2000 (aged 59)
- Place of death: Carlisle, England
- Height: 5 ft 11 in (1.80 m)
- Position: Midfielder

Youth career
- 1955–1957: Shrewsbury Town

Senior career*
Years	Team	Apps	(Gls)
1958–1965	Huddersfield Town	117	(24)
1965–1975	Carlisle United	376	(68)
1975–1976	Doncaster Rovers	39	(1)
1976–1978	Queen of the South	34	(0)
- Cricket career
Cricket information
- Batting: Right-handed
- Bowling: Slow left-arm orthodox
International information
- National side: England
- Test debut: 22 July 1976 v West Indies
- Last Test: 12 August 1976 v West Indies
Umpiring information
- ODIs umpired: 2 (1994–1998)
Career statistics
Competition	Test	First-class	LA
Matches	2	390	238
Runs scored	39	19,034	5,664
Batting average	9.75	34.11	31.46
100s/50s	0/0	32/103	5/32
Top score	35	181*	119*
Balls bowled	96	19,224	819
Wickets	1	310	28
Bowling average	80.00	26.32	20.53
5 wickets in innings	0	5	0
10 wickets in match	0	0	0
Best bowling	1/80	6/25	4/33
Catches/stumpings	1/–	210/–	77/–
- Source: Cricinfo, 28 August 2010
- * Club domestic league appearances and goals

John Christopher Balderstone (16 November 1940 – 6 March 2000) was an English professional in cricket and football, and one of the last sportsmen to combine both sports over a prolonged period. He played football as a midfielder for Huddersfield Town, Carlisle United, Doncaster Rovers and Queen of the South. He played and umpired in first-class cricket making it to international level – he played in two Tests in 1976 and umpired in two ODIs between 1994 and 1998. In a long club career, he was a key part of the five trophy winning Leicestershire side of the early and mid-1970s.

== Football career ==
=== Huddersfield Town ===
Balderstone's football career started with Huddersfield Town where he was signed by Bill Shankly in May 1958. He made 117 Football League appearances for Huddersfield, and played a total of 131 senior games for them (scoring 25 goals).

=== Carlisle United ===
In June 1965 he moved for £7,000 to Carlisle United who had just been promoted to the second tier of English football for the first time in their history. As Balderstone later said, "They gave me a bit of stick at first because I wasn't the quickest player or the hardest tackler. I used to think I made up for it with speed of thought and control of the ball. I always had confidence in my ability and I knew there'd be somebody in the crowd who appreciated a bit of skill. I won them over and they were very good to me after that."

He scored on his debut, a 4–1 home win over Norwich City, which gave him the distinction of scoring the club's first ever goal in the second level of English football. He stayed with Carlisle for the next 11 years, the club's most successful period where not only was he a key player but also became club captain.

His most notable cup run was in the 1969–70 League Cup where Carlisle made it to the semi-final. He enjoyed other successes in cup competitions, "In 1970 we beat Manchester City in the League Cup when they had Lee, Bell and Summerbee. And in '74 we beat Sunderland at Roker Park in the FA Cup when they were the Cup holders. We played against Liverpool in the next round and took them to a replay."

In 1973–74 Balderstone enjoyed promotion to the First Division, then the highest level in the English football pyramid. It was Balderstone's penalty against Pat Jennings and Tottenham Hotspur that had Carlisle briefly topping England's Football League after the first 3 games of the 1974–75 season. However, Carlisle were relegated at the end of the season, the only relegation in Balderstone's career. In all he made 376 League appearances for the Cumbrian club.

=== Doncaster Rovers and Queen of the South ===
Balderstone joined Doncaster Rovers after his top-level season with Carlisle. It was when with Rovers he became the only player to play League Football and first-class cricket on the same day (see Cricket Career under Leicestershire section).

Balderstone's next club was in Scotland. "Queen of the South rang me up. Carlisle used to play practice matches against them and they remembered me. I caught the train to Dumfries from Leicester every Friday night. It was quite a trek but it gave me another couple of years football." When George Cloy and Crawford Boyd were each later interviewed for the Queen of the South website, each commented on Balderstone's ability with the ball. Cloy in particular said Balderstone's passing ability was the best in Cloy's entire career at Queens.

He later played for non-league Enderby Town.

== Cricket career ==
=== Yorkshire ===
Balderstone first appeared for Yorkshire on 10 June 1961.

=== Leicestershire ===
Balderstone later remembered, "Ray Illingworth took me to Leicestershire. I might be a decent bloke on the outside but he knew I was mentally hard through football. Cricketers might think they're pretty hard but they're not compared to footballers. It was a great move for me."

Leicestershire won their first-ever trophy in 1972, the inaugural Benson and Hedges Cup at Lord's, and Balderstone took the man of the match Gold Award. He scored 41 not out and steered the team to the trophy. This marked the beginning of a golden era for Leicestershire, with 5 trophies in 5 seasons, and Balderstone was at the core of the side.

In 1973 Balderstone played his first full season of cricket and jumped right to the front-rank of English batsmen, making 1,222 runs at an average of 42. He passed the 1,000-run mark in 10 of the next 12 seasons, batting either in the middle order or as an opening batsman. His runs were an important part of Leicestershire's first County Championship success in 1975, and he weighed in with 43 useful wickets in that season too.

In 1974, he top scored for his side in the Benson and Hedges final but they were defeated by Surrey. However, they did win the Sunday League, bettering their runners-up spot of two years before.

Balderstone made history on 15 September 1975 by taking part in a County Championship match and a Football League game on the same day. Balderstone was 51 not out against Derbyshire at the end of day two of Leicestershire's match at Chesterfield. After close of play he changed into his football kit to play for Doncaster Rovers in an evening match 30 miles away (a 1–1 draw with Brentford). He then returned to Chesterfield the following morning to complete a century and take three wickets to help wrap up Leicestershire's first ever County Championship title. In 1977 Leicestershire won their last trophy in this period, a second Sunday League victory.

Among his many personal notes was in 1976 when he did the hat-trick against Sussex at Eastbourne. Five years later, against Essex at Grace Road, Leicestershire's home ground, he shared an unbroken county record second wicket stand of 289 with David Gower.

Having had a delayed cricket career, Balderstone played on for Leicestershire into his mid-40s without noticeably losing batting form or his fielding athleticism. Though he bowled less frequently from 1980 onwards, his batting helped take Leicestershire to runners up in the 1982 County Championship. He picked up a sixth and final winners' medal with a third Benson & Hedges victory in 1985. This makes him winner of the highest number of medals in the club's history. Balderstone was given a testimonial benefit season in 1984 and played on for Leicestershire until 1986.

Balderstone was one of ten members of Leicestershire's first County Championship winning team in 1975 to have a road in Leicester named after him by the city council. Peter Booth, Brian Davison, Barry Dudleston, Ken Higgs, David Humphries, Ray Illingworth Norman McVicker, John Steele and Roger Tolchard were the others. Jack Birkenshaw, Graham McKenzie and Mick Norman missed out as there were already roads using their surnames.

=== England ===
In 1976, Balderstone was called into the England Test team to make his international debut aged 35 having focused in his younger days on football. Against other international sides he might have played more Tests, for he was chosen on the strength of consistent quality performances for Leicestershire. It was his misfortune, however, to come up against the West Indies just as they were reaching that level of intimidation they were to maintain for the next two decades. Against the fearsome pace of Andy Roberts and Michael Holding he struggled, like so many other English batsmen: his four innings produced only 39 runs. He did though score 35 from sticking it out for 3 1/2 hours at the crease on his test debut. In his second test, at a parched Oval, he encountered Michael Holding and one of the finest individual fast-bowling performances in history – Holding took 14 wickets in the test. Opposing fast bowler Vanburn Holder later said, "I played against him when we had a pretty ferocious attack and he never blinked. He had plenty of courage."

=== Umpire ===
Balderstone moved directly into umpiring the season after he stopped playing, standing in two One Day Internationals in the mid-1990s.

== Death ==
Chris Balderstone died suddenly at his home in Carlisle on 6 March 2000, having suffered from prostate cancer.

Barrie Leadbeater, the umpires' chairman and a close friend, said: "He was a fine, positive player who won a lot of friends by his approach. He was a gentleman in everything he did on and off the field and his death came as a tremendous shock. He will be sadly missed. There was a refreshing honesty about everything he did and he was a true sportsman of the like we don't see today."

Vanburn Holder, like Balderstone, became an umpire and stood in Balderstone's last game as an umpire, at the St Lawrence Ground, Canterbury. Holder said: "He was a great companion, a fine umpire and an exceptional sportsman."

== Honours ==
=== Football ===
Carlisle United:-

- Second Division 1973/74 – promotion
- League Cup 1969/70 – Semi finalist

=== Cricket ===
Leicestershire:-

- County Championship – winner – 1975; runner up 1982
- Sunday/National League – winner – 1974, 1977; runner up 1972
- Benson & Hedges Cup – winner – 1972, 1975, 1985; runner up 1974
