= Ray Illingworth =

English cricketer (1932–2021)

Ray Illingworth CBE
- Bowling

Personal information
- Born: 8 June 1932; Pudsey, West Riding of Yorkshire, England
- Died: 25 December 2021 (aged 89)
- Batting: Right-handed
- Bowling: Right-arm off break
- Role: All rounder

International information
- National side: England
- Test debut (cap 389): 24 July 1958 v New Zealand
- Last Test: 23 August 1973 v West Indies
- ODI debut (cap 7): 5 January 1971 v Australia
- Last ODI: 20 July 1973 v New Zealand

Domestic team information
- Years: Team
- 1951–1968: Yorkshire
- 1969–1978: Leicestershire
- 1982–1983: Yorkshire

Career statistics
Competition	Tests	ODIs	FC	LA
Matches	61	3	787	218
Runs scored	1,836	5	24,134	2,380
Batting average	23.24	2.50	28.06	26.74
100s/50s	2/5	0/0	22/105	0/4
Top score	113	4	162	79
Balls bowled	11,934	130	117,860	8,097
Wickets	122	4	2,072	186
Bowling average	31.20	21.00	20.27	25.19
5 wickets in innings	3	0	104	3
10 wickets in match	0	0	11	0
Best bowling	6/29	3/50	9/42	5/20
Catches/stumpings	45/–	1/–	446/–	58/–
- Source: Cricinfo, 24 November 2021

Raymond Illingworth (8 June 1932 – 25 December 2021) was an English cricketer, commentator and administrator. He is one of only nine players to have taken 2,000 wickets and made 20,000 runs in first-class cricket. He played for Yorkshire (1951–1968 and 1982–1983), Leicestershire (1969–1978) and England (1958–1973) and was a Wisden Cricketer of the Year in 1960.

== Early years ==
Illingworth was born in Pudsey, West Riding of Yorkshire on 8 June 1932. As a teenager he played at Farsley Cricket Club.

As a teenager he had assisted his local club ground, Bradford League Club for domestic club matches by preparing grounds. His father was a cabinet-maker and joiner. His father also worked shifts at a munitions factory during the World War II. His father then returned to the business of cabinet making and Ray often helped his father with repairs, upholstery and French polishing.

He left school at the age of 14 and started playing for Farsley Cricket Club main XI shortly after the end of World War II in 1945. He turned out for Farsley First XI at the age of 13. He was known for his knock of an unbeaten 148 in a Priestley Cup final which was contested as part of Bradford Premier League. He was called up for national service at the age of 18 when he was on the verge of potentially being selected to county cricket level. He also went on to ply his trade playing for the RAF and for the Combined Services during the time when he was on national service.

== Playing style ==
Illingworth was a keen student of the game. He had a realistic approach, and "only liked to gamble on certainties."

As a bowler, he was not a sharp spinner of the ball, relying on accuracy and subtle variations of flight, but his arm ball was particularly effective, many of his victims being caught at slip, playing for spin that was not there. In county cricket, he took 2072 wickets. He bowled 408 balls without reward in three Tests against New Zealand in 1973 but conceded only 1.91 runs an over in his Test career.

His middle-order batting was based around stern defence; a fifth of his innings, mostly at number 6 or 7 in the order, finished not out. He scored 24,134 first-class runs in all, with a best of 162, at an average of 28.06. Against the Rest of the World in 1970, Illingworth topped the England averages with 476 runs (52.89) and six half-centuries.

== Captaincy style ==
The Yorkshireman was 'tough, combative, grudging, shrewd, and an instinctive reader of the game', and an experienced, no-nonsense captain who expected his team to play like professionals. David Gower wrote 'no matter how highly Ray might regard you as a player he would not have you in his team, come hell or high water, unless he was utterly convinced that you could do the job he had allocated to you'. He managed 'difficult' players like Geoff Boycott and John Snow well, and they responded with their best Test form. 'Most of all, because he insisted on his "own side", he was able to get the best out of his players, both mentally and physically. He built up a tremendous team spirit which stood us in good stead on numerous occasions', and they tended to close ranks and treat the opposition, umpires, press and public as the enemy, an attitude that became prevalent amongst Test teams in the 1970s.

Illingworth captained England in 31 Test matches, winning 12, losing 5 and drawing 14.

== Record ==
=== Player ===
Illingworth played 787 first-class matches over nearly 33 years.

=== County level ===
Illingworth made his first-class debut at 19, was capped in 1955 and became a stalwart of the Yorkshire team thereafter. In 1957, he completed a seasonal "double", with more than 1,000 runs and 100 wickets, a feat he repeated five times over the next seven years. As captain his experience and knowledge of the game were widely believed to have helped Yorkshire to their County Championship victories in 1966, 1967 and 1968. In 1968 he joined Leicestershire after a contract dispute with Yorkshire, and was made captain.

=== Test level ===
Illingworth made his Test début for England in 1958 but struggled on his first tour, in the West Indies in 1959–60, taking just four wickets in five Test matches. After failing to make an impact in four Tests against South Africa he found himself struggling for a place. A good series against India in 1967 established him in the team.

The selectors had long regarded Colin Cowdrey as England's natural cricket captain, but he ruptured an Achilles tendon early in the season and Illingworth was his replacement after only a month as county captain. Illingworth had been in and out of the national side for years, but had taken 20 wickets (13.30) against India in 1967 and 13 more (22.39) against Australia in 1968. He was originally chosen over his rivals like Brian Close as he was not a threat to Cowdrey's long-term captaincy due to his age and inability to establish a regular spot in the Test team. In the Second Test against the West Indies at Lord's in 1969, England collapsed to 61–5, but the new skipper made a forceful 113 out of the last 155 runs and became a hero. He defeated both the West Indies and New Zealand 2–0 and was confirmed as captain even when Cowdrey recovered.

Illingworth captained England for five seasons (1969–1973) and this was a very successful period in English Cricket. Under Illingworth, England defeated the West Indies 2–0 in 1969, held a powerful Rest of the World side to 1-4 in 1970, won the Ashes in Australia in 1970–71, defeated Pakistan in 1971, somewhat surprisingly lost to India in 1971 but then regrouped and held on to the Ashes in a tight series in 1972 before eventually losing a series to a strong West Indies team in 1973.

Illingworth's captaincy can perhaps be considered responsible for the victories in several of those tighter contests. For example, at Headingley in 1969 the West Indies were 219 – 3 chasing 303 when Illingworth's inspired bowling change had Basil Butcher caught behind and wickets fell with just about every bowling change he made that afternoon. Similarly at Sydney in the 7th Test of the 1970–71 series it was Illingworth, deprived of his star batsman Geoff Boycott and his star bowler John Snow, who somehow pressurised the Australian batsmen into capitulation.

Those two matches are often seen as Illingworth's greatest moments as captain due to their fame. However, it was his effective tactics at Headingley in 1971 that are cited as his finest victory. With Pakistan needing only 231 to win - they were nearing victory with Sadiq Mohammad and Asif Iqbal in full command at 160–4. Alan Knott stumped Asif from the bowling of Norman Gifford (Asif the batsman) and then Illingworth's bowling changes, just as they had two years earlier, resulted in more wickets – including the key wicket of Sadiq – c&b by Basil D'Oliveira, leading to a 25 run win.

The 1972 series was a particularly successful Ashes, if not the most successful (with the possible exception of 2005). The seasoned pros of England in Boycott, Edrich, D'Oliveira, Illingworth himself, Underwood and Snow faced the upcoming young Australians (Ian and Greg Chappell, Dennis Lillee, Rod Marsh, Doug Walters) who would dominate for the middle part of the decade. The series was drawn 2–2 but included tight games at Headingley and particularly the Oval, where the match lasted almost six days with Australia chasing 242 with only 5 wickets in hand.

In 1973 Illingworth's tenure as captain of England ended, and in the next two matches England won against New Zealand but were defeated by the West Indies. England had to win at Lord's to level the three-Test series. West Indies had first use of a quick but perfectly even batting wicket and made 650 at a rapid scoring rate as England's bowling attack of Willis, Arnold, Greig, Underwood and Illingworth were humiliated by Kanhai, Sobers and Bernard Julien. When England batted, they were unable to effectively play against Lance Gibbs and lost by an innings. Wisden fairly described it as "a sad end to the Illingworth era".

==== England's unbeaten run ====
When Illingworth became captain England had lost only one of their previous 14 Test matches, and none of their last 7. He continued this run to a record-breaking 27 Test Matches without defeat in 1968–71, or one defeat in 40 Tests in 1966–71. This record was not recognised at the time as the games against the Rest of the World XI were counted as Test matches and was subsequently equalled by Clive Lloyd's West Indies in 1981–84.

- 1–1 (5 Tests) vs Australia in 1968, Australia winning the First Test at Old Trafford by 159 runs.
- 0–0 (3 Tests) in Pakistan 1968–69.
- 2–0 (3 Tests) vs the West Indies 1969.
- 2–0 (3 Tests) vs New Zealand 1969.
- 2–0 (7 Tests) in Australia 1970–71.
- 1–0 (2 Tests) in New Zealand 1970–71.
- 1–0 (3 Tests) vs Pakistan 1971.
- 0–1 (3 Tests) vs India 1971, India winning the Third Test at the Oval by 4 wickets.

==== Rest of the World XI ====
There was no tour in 1969–70 and no tourists in 1970 as the series with South Africa was cancelled due to the Basil d'Oliveira Affair and concerns over anti-apartheid demonstrations that had led to barbed wire at Lord's. Rather than send an unprepared team to Australia, a Rest of the World XI was formed primarily from overseas players in the County Championship, captained by Garfield Sobers, and including the South Africans Graeme Pollock, Mike Procter, Barry Richards and Eddie Barlow. They could not be regarded as a national Test team and the matches were given the status of 'unofficial Tests', but the runs scored and wickets taken were added to official Test statistics until it was decided by the I.C.C. that they should not count. England were defeated by a superior team, but this was not unexpected. The only surprise was that they managed to win one game and almost won two others against what was arguably the strongest Test team ever assembled.

==== Australia ====
(See Main Article English cricket team in Australia in 1970–71)

Illingworth led England to a 2–0 Ashes victory in 1970–71, the only time a touring team has played a full Test series in Australia without defeat. The future Australian captain, Greg Chappell, later wrote:

Ray Illingworth's England side in 1970–71 were mentally the toughest English side I played against, and the experience of playing against them first up in my Test career reinforced what I had learnt in the backyard. Test cricket was not for the faint of heart. Illingworth subjected us to a mental intimidation by aggressive field placings, and physical intimidation by constant use of his pace attack, ably led by one of the best fast bowlers of my experience, John Snow. Winning to Illingworth was something he expected of himself and demanded of his team.

==== Trouble with the M.C.C. ====
The M.C.C. tour manager was D. G. Clark. Bernard Thomas of Warwickshire was the assistant manager and physiotherapist, and G. C. A. Saulez the scorer. Clark had been the amateur captain of Kent in 1949–51 and was described by Illingworth as "an amiable, but somewhat ineffectual man", and there were soon divisions between him and the players. After the Second Test Clark criticised both captains for cautious play, England for their short-pitched bowling and indicated that he would prefer to see Australia win 3–1 than see four more draws. Illingworth only discovered this when he was asked for a comment by a journalist in the morning and the rest of the team when they read the newspapers at the airport. As a result, Illingworth effectively took over the running of the tour with the support of the players and Clark's influence declined.

Unlike his predecessors, Illingworth insisted on good hotel accommodation, decent sporting facilities, better travel arrangements, higher allowances and pay, and fought hard to get them, which was greatly appreciated by the players. In the final Sydney Test Clark tried to push Illingworth back on to the field when he took the team off because of the crowd throwing beer cans after the Snow-Jenner incident. A furious Illingworth said he would not return until the playing area had been cleared and the crowd had calmed down and objected to Clark constantly siding with the Australians against his own team. When the team returned to England, Illingworth said that "all hell would break loose" if anyone was denied his good conduct bonus (as with Fred Trueman in the West Indies in 1953–54), but this did not happen.

==== Later captaincy ====
Series wins over New Zealand and Pakistan followed, and a despite a loss against India in 1971, he scored his second Test century and enjoyed bowling success. He revealed, in an interview with Shyam Bhatia, 30 years after the loss, that he regretted not bowling Brian Luckhurst's occasional left arm spin against the Indians on a sluggish pitch which had blunted Derek Underwood. He retained the Ashes at home in 1972 against Ian Chappell's powerful young side with an exciting 2–2 series draw. In 1972–73 he declined to tour India, Tony Lewis leading the team instead, and when he took back the reins in 1973 he beat New Zealand 2–0, but lost 2–0 to the West Indies and Illingworth was dropped as England captain in the middle of the final test at Lord's.

=== Return from retirement ===
Leicestershire benefited from his return, winning four one day trophies and the County Championship in 1975. After announcing his retirement from the first-class game in 1978 he returned to Headingley to manage the Yorkshire team, despite his testy relationship with Geoff Boycott. In 1982, faced with an under-performing team on the field, he made a return to the playing arena and replaced Chris Old as captain. The side won the Sunday League in his final season in 1983 but failed in the championship, finishing bottom for the first time ever. The title of the book he wrote about this era was The Tempestuous Years.

== After retirement ==
Illingworth left Yorkshire in 1984 and carved out a successful career as a media pundit, often fiercely critical of the England Test team. After his retirement, he remained a pivotal figure in English cricket, first as an uncompromising pundit in TV coverage of BBC before being elevated to the status of national supremo in the mid-1990s in which he served as coach and national selector.

Eventually he became the chairman of England's Board of Test Selectors (1993–1996) and the England cricket coach (1995–1996). He often clashed with England captain Mike Atherton over team selection. Mike Atherton launched a scathing attack on Illingworth accusing him of playing double standards, making unproductive public announcements and for abandoning the youth policy during team selections which was in place during the appointment of Atherton as captain in 1993. Atherton also revealed that Illingworth wanted him to be replaced by Alec Stewart as England test captain after England's disastrous Ashes performances in 1995.

He still continued preparing pitches at Farsley until the age of 78 and finally gave up his job as a groundsman in 2010 citing back problems.

== Recognition ==
Illingworth was one of Wisden's 5 Cricketers of the Year in 1959. He was awarded the CBE for services to cricket in 1973 and made an honorary member of the Marylebone Cricket Club (MCC). He was the fourth cricketer to be elected to Yorkshire's 'Hall of Fame' and was President of Yorkshire County Cricket in 2010/2011.

Illingworth was one of ten members of Leicestershire's first County Championship winning team in 1975 to have a road in Leicester named after him by the city council. Chris Balderstone, Peter Booth, Brian Davison, Barry Dudleston, Ken Higgs, David Humphries, Norman McVicker, John Steele and Roger Tolchard were the others. Jack Birkenshaw, Graham McKenzie and Mick Norman missed out as there were already roads using their surnames.

== Personal life and death ==
Illingworth was married to Shirley Milnes from 1958 until her death in March 2021. They had two daughters, Diane and Vicky.

In November 2021, he advocated assisted suicide, revealing that he had been diagnosed with an aggressive form of oesophageal cancer. He also lent his support to the Assisted Dying Bill which he wanted to be legalised in the UK. The bill received its second reading at the House of Lords in October 2021. He had insisted that he believed in assisted dying and he said that he did not want to "live the way his wife had suffered" from the disease for the past twelve months prior to her death and instead he would "leave the world peacefully".

He died on 25 December 2021, at the age of 89, and was survived by his daughters.

Sporting positions
Preceded by Colin Cowdrey; Tony Lewis	English national cricket captain 1969–72; 1973	Succeeded by Tony Lewis; Mike Denness
Preceded by None; Brian Close	England ODI Captain; 1970–71; 1973	Succeeded by Brian Close; Mike Denness
