= 1989 Refuge Assurance Cup =

- Administrator(s): Test and County Cricket Board
- Cricket format: Limited overs cricket (40 overs per innings)
- Tournament format(s): Knockout
- Champions: Essex (1st title)
- Participants: 4
- Matches: 3
- Most runs: 139 Paul Prichard (Essex)
- Most wickets: 5 Derek Pringle (Essex)/Graham Gooch (Essex)/Andy Pick (Notts)

The 1989 Refuge Assurance Cup was the second competing of the Refuge Assurance Cup, for the most successful teams in the Sunday League. It was an English limited overs county cricket tournament which was held between 6 and 17 September 1989. The tournament was won by Essex County Cricket Club who defeated Nottinghamshire County Cricket Club by 5 runs in the final at Edgbaston, Birmingham.

== Format ==
The cup was an end-of-season affair. The counties finishing in the top four of the 1989 Refuge Assurance League competed in the semi-finals. The top two teams were drawn at home. Winners from the semi-finals then went on to the final at Edgbaston which was held on 17 September 1989.

=== Semi-finals ===
6 September 1989
(scorecard)

Lancashire; 187/9 (40 overs)	v	Nottinghamshire; 188/5 (39.2 overs)
Neil Fairbrother 59; Andy Pick 4/25 (8 overs)		Chris Broad 49; Wasim Akram 1/28 (8 overs)

Nottinghamshire won by 5 wickets
Old Trafford, Manchester
Umpires: John Harris and Roy Palmer
Player of the match: Wasim Akram (Lancashire)

6 September 1989
(scorecard)

Essex; 211/7 (40 overs)	v	Worcestershire; 110 all out (34.1 overs)
Paul Prichard 82 * Neal Radford 2/40 (8 overs)		Phil Neale 22; Graham Gooch 3/13 (6 overs)

Essex won by 101 runs
New Road, Worcester
Umpires: David Constant & Kevin Lyons
Player of the match: Paul Prichard (Essex)

=== Final ===
17 September 1989
(scorecard)

Essex; 160/5 (40 overs)	v	Nottinghamshire; 155 all out (39.4 overs)
Paul Prichard 57; Eddie Hemmings 1/24 (8 overs)		Chris Broad 39; Derek Pringle 4/20 (7.4 overs)

Essex won by 5 runs
Edgbaston, Birmingham
Umpires: John Holder & Barry Meyer
Player of the match: Paul Prichard (Essex)

The attendance at the final was approximately 8,000.
