= Barry Dudleston =

English cricketer and umpire

Personal information
- Full name: Barry Dudleston
- Born: 16 July 1945 (age 81); Bebington, Cheshire, England
- Height: 5 ft 9 in (1.75 m)

Umpiring information
- Tests umpired: 2 (1991–1992)
- ODIs umpired: 4 (1992–2001)
- WODIs umpired: 1 (2004)
- Source: Cricinfo, 8 September 2007

Barry Dudleston (born 16 July 1945) is a former first-class cricketer and umpire. He was a right-handed batsman and occasional wicketkeeper who played cricket for Leicestershire, Gloucestershire and Rhodesia. By the end of his 295 first-class games career, he had made 14,747 runs at 32.48, with 32 hundreds, 47 wickets, 234 catches and 7 stumpings.

After his playing career ended, he became an umpire and officiated in two Test matches and four ODI games. Along with John Hampshire, he umpired in the last Benson and Hedges Cup final in 2002, thirty years after helping Leicestershire beat Yorkshire (including John Hampshire) by five wickets in the first Benson and Hedges Cup final in 1972.

Dudleston was one of ten members of Leicestershire's first County Championship winning team in 1975 to have a road in Leicester named after him by the city council. Chris Balderstone, Peter Booth, Brian Davison, Ken Higgs, David Humphries, Ray Illingworth, Norman McVicker, John Steele and Roger Tolchard were the others. Jack Birkenshaw, Graham McKenzie and Mick Norman missed out as there were already roads using their surnames.

== See also ==
- List of Test cricket umpires
- List of One Day International cricket umpires
