= Brian Reynolds (cricketer) =

English cricketer

Personal information
- Full name: Brian Leonard Reynolds
- Born: 10 June 1932; Kettering, Northamptonshire, England
- Died: 7 February 2015 (aged 82)
- Nickname: Bronk
- Height: 5 ft 8 in (1.73 m)
- Batting: Right-handed
- Bowling: Right-arm off-break
- Role: Batsman, occasional wicketkeeper

Domestic team information
- Years: Team
- 1950–70: Northamptonshire

Career statistics
Competition	FC	List A
Matches	429	36
Runs scored	18824	493
Batting average	28.01	17.60
100s/50s	21/97	0/1
Top score	169	68*
Balls bowled	896	0
Wickets	4	–
Bowling average	71.00	–
5 wickets in innings	0	–
10 wickets in match	0	–
Best bowling	1/0	–
Catches/stumpings	302/20	15/–
- Source: CricketArchive, 15 June 2010

Brian Leonard Reynolds (10 June 1932 – 7 February 2015) was a professional cricketer who spent his entire career at Northamptonshire.

== Biography ==
Reynolds was born on 10 June 1932, in Kettering, Northamptonshire.

Brian Reynolds' contribution to Northamptonshire extended beyond his performances for the first team. For 13 seasons, he was chief coach in charge of the Second XI, and a further 11 years in the specially-created role of Cricket Development Officer. In John Arlott's words: "In his own mind he is not only a cricketer, he is a Northamptonshire cricketer."

A Kettering boy, born and bred, Reynolds joined the Northamptonshire staff in 1950 and made his championship debut that summer against Sussex at Northampton. After national service, he returned to the County Ground and broke through in 1956 by passing 1,000 runs for the first time to earn his county cap. Reynolds missed the entire 1959 season thanks to a football injury (he appeared for both Kettering Town and Peterborough United, later qualifying as a referee) but was hardly ever absent from the Northamptonshire side between 1960 and 1968.

Forming a reliable opening partnership with Michael Norman, Reynolds topped 1,500 runs in five consecutive summers. His best return was 1,843 in 1962, closely followed by 1,809 the year after. He also remained one of the fittest members of the staff.

It would have been his crowning glory of his benefit year, 1965, had Northamptonshire managed to win the Championship title. That they failed narrowly to do so was due in part to Worcestershire's victory over Hampshire at Bournemouth in a match of three declarations in late August. This caused, as Wisden admitted, "a great deal of controversy". Reynolds, the senior pro, had been playing golf with skipper Keith Andrew when the news came through of Colin Ingleby-Mackenzie's closure 146 runs behind; soon afterwards, Hampshire had been skittled for 31 to hand Don Kenyon's men the points. The disappointment of 1965 notwithstanding, the triumvirate of Andrew, vice-captain Roger Prideaux, and Reynolds still guided the club through some of its most successful seasons.

The committee's decision to release Reynolds at the end of 1970 was less popular around the county than their appointment of him as coach three years later. Ken Turner knew his man: "I want you to get these lads" (in the second XI) "so tired during the day that they won't have any energy left to go out at night!" Those who were serious about wanting first-team cricket, like David Capel and Rob Bailey, got on with it and duly achieved their goal.

Later, as one of the first CDOs in the country, he spread the cricketing gospel into Northamptonshire schools and developed the Centre of Excellence scheme, which has produced several talented youngsters. He also travelled many miles each summer on scouting missions. When Reynolds officially retired in 1997, chairman Lynn Wilson said in that year's Annual Report: "Throughout the long history of the County Cricket Club there have been few, if any, individuals more committed and dedicated to Northamptonshire's cause."

He died in 2015 at the age of 82.
