= Eric McKenzie =

Australian cricketer

Personal information
- Full name: Eric Norman McKenzie
- Born: 9 December 1910; Kalgoorlie, Western Australia
- Died: 28 April 1994 (aged 83); Cottesloe, Western Australia
- Batting: Right-handed
- Role: Batsman
- Relatives: Douglas McKenzie (brother); Graham McKenzie (son)

Domestic team information
- Years: Team
- 1931/32: Western Australia
- Only First-class: 22 October 1931 Western Australia v South Africans

Career statistics
Competition	First-class
Matches	1
Runs scored	43
Batting average	21.50
100s/50s	0/0
Top score	26
Catches/stumpings	0/–
- Source: CricketArchive, 8 November 2011

Eric Norman McKenzie (9 December 1910 – 28 April 1994) was an Australian cricketer. A right-handed batsman, McKenzie represented Western Australia in his only first-class match, against the South African tourists at Perth in October 1931. He also played in grade cricket, and played field hockey for Western Australia. McKenzie enlisted in the Australian Army during the Second World War, and was posted to England, where he played in several games for an army cricket team. His brother Douglas McKenzie and son Graham McKenzie also represented Western Australia.
