= Umer Rashid =

English cricketer (1976–2002)

Personal information
- Full name: Umer Bin Abdul Rashid
- Born: 6 February 1976; Southampton, England
- Died: 1 April 2002 (aged 26); Concord Falls, Grenada
- Batting: Left-handed
- Bowling: Slow left-arm orthodox
- Role: All-rounder

Domestic team information
- Years: Team
- 1995–1998: Middlesex
- 1999–2001: Sussex

Career statistics
Competition	First-class	List A
Matches	41	71
Runs scored	1,421	594
Batting average	25.37	14.48
100s/50s	2/7	0/1
Top score	110	82
Balls bowled	4,216	3091
Wickets	49	73
Bowling average	42.30	33.34
5 wickets in innings	1	1
10 wickets in match	0	0
Best bowling	5/103	5/24
Catches/stumpings	12/–	23/–
- Source: CricketArchive, 9 October 2022

Umer Bin Abdul Rashid (6 February 1976 – 1 April 2002) was an English first-class cricketer who played for Middlesex and Sussex County Cricket Clubs.

Rashid played as an allrounder who bowled slow left-arm orthodox and batted left-handed. He was a member of the Marcus Trescothick led 1995 Under-19 series against South Africa. In one of the games he struck 64 from number 11 and made 97 not out in another. With the ball he took 10 for 71 in one of the unofficial Test matches played.

His first-class debut came in 1996 for Middlesex before he moved to Sussex in 1999. He made 2 centuries in his career, an innings of 110 against Glamorgan and 106 at Chester-le-Street. His slow left arm bowling gave him 49 first-class wickets and a best of 5 for 103 against Northampton.

In 2002 Sussex travelled to Grenada for a pre-season tournament. He had been swimming at a popular tourist spot Concord Falls when his brother Burhan got into trouble. Rashid drowned attempting to rescue him.
