= 1972 County Championship =

English cricket season

- Dates: 3 May – 12 September 1972
- Cricket format: First-class cricket (3 days)
- Tournament format: League system
- Champions: Warwickshire (3rd title)
- Participants: 17
- Matches: 170
- Most runs: Mushtaq Mohammad (1,743 for Northamptonshire)
- Most wickets: Tom Cartwright (93 for Somerset); Barry Stead (93 for Nottinghamshire)

The 1972 County Championship was the 73rd officially organised running of the County Championship, and ran from 3 May to 12 September 1972. Warwickshire County Cricket Club claimed their third title.

== Table ==
- Pld = Played, W = Wins, L = Losses, D = Draws, D1 = Draws in matches reduced to single innings, A = Abandonments, BatBP = Batting points, BowBP = Bowling points, Pts = Points.
- 10 points for a win
- 5 points to each team for a tie
- 5 points to team still batting in a match in which scores finish level
- Bonus points awarded in first 85 overs of first innings
- Batting: 1 point for each 25 runs above 150
- Bowling: 2 point for every 2 wickets taken
- No bonus points awarded in a match starting with less than 8 hours' play remaining.
- Position determined by points gained. If equal, then decided on most wins.
- Each team plays 20 matches.

	Team	P	W	L	D	A	Bat	Bowl	Pts
1	Warwickshire	20	9	0	11	0	68	69	227
2	Kent	20	7	4	9	0	69	52	191
3	Gloucestershire	20	7	4	9	0	38	77	185
4	Northamptonshire	20	7	3	10	0	34	77	181
5	Essex	20	6	4	10	0	50	63	173
6	Leicestershire	20	6	2	12	0	43	68	171
7	Worcestershire	20	4	4	12	0	59	68	167
8	Middlesex	20	5	5	10	0	48	61	159
9	Hampshire	20	4	6	10	0	50	64	154
10	Yorkshire	20	4	5	11	0	39	73	152
11	Somerset	20	4	2	14	0	34	71	145
12	Surrey	20	3	5	12	0	49	61	140
13	Glamorgan	20	1	7	12	0	55	61	126
14	Nottinghamshire	20	1	6	13	0	38	73	121
15	Lancashire	20	2	3	14	1	41	57	118
16	Sussex	20	2	8	10	0	46	49	115
17	Derbyshire	20	1	5	13	1	27	60	97
	Source: CricketArchive								

=== Results ===
	Derbyshire	Essex	Glamorgan	Gloucester	Hampshire	Kent	Lancashire	Leicester	Middlesex	Northampton	Nottingham	Somerset	Surrey	Sussex	Warwick	Worcester	Yorkshire
Derbyshire		1-4 Jul; Essex; 41 runs	21-23 Jun; Match drawn		12-15 Aug; Match drawn		24-27 Jun; Match abandoned	17–19 May; Match drawn		26-28 Jul; Match drawn	5-8 Aug; Match drawn	30 Aug-1 Sep; Somerset; 2 wickets		12-14 Jul; Derbyshire; 3 wickets			17-20 Jun; Match drawn
Essex				15-18 Jul; Gloucestershire; 107 runs	24–26 May; Match drawn			5-8 Aug; Match drawn	12-14 Jul; Match drawn	23-25 Aug; Northamptonshire; 164 runs		7-9 Jun; Essex; 9 wickets	21-23 Jun; Essex; 8 wickets		27–30 May; Match drawn	9-11 Aug; Match drawn	19-22 Aug; Essex; 6 wickets
Glamorgan		12-15 Aug; Essex; 2 wickets		1-4 Jul; Match drawn	10–12 May; Match drawn			7-9 Jun; Match drawn	30 Aug-1 Sep; Match drawn	26-29 Aug; Northamptonshire; 29 runs	15-18 Jul; Match drawn	10-13 Jun; Somerset inns & 25 runs		24-27 Jun; Match drawn		24–26 May; Match drawn	
Gloucestershire	9-11 Aug; Gloucestershire; 5 wickets		9-12 Sep; Match drawn		17-20 Jun; Gloucestershire; 2 wickets		5-8 Aug; Match drawn		12-15 Aug; Middlesex; 6 wickets		30 Aug-1 Sep; Nottinghamshire; 42 runs	27–30 May; Match drawn	8-11 Jul; Match drawn	21-23 Jun; Gloucestershire; 230 runs		12-15 Jul; Gloucestershire; 9 runs	
Hampshire			9-11 Aug; Glamorgan; 4 wickets	7-9 Jun; Match drawn		15-18 Jul; Match drawn	26-29 Aug; Match drawn	1-3 Jul; Leicestershire; 9 wickets				8-11 Jul; Match drawn		30 Aug-1 Sep; Match drawn	21-23 Jun; Warwickshire; 5 wickets	5-8 Aug; Hampshire; 9 wickets	9-12 Sep; Match drawn
Kent	7-9 Jun; Match drawn	8-11 Jul; Match drawn	5-8 Aug; Kent; 7 wickets	10-13 Jun; Gloucestershire; 2 wickets	23-25 Aug; Kent; 5 wickets				5-7 Jul; Kent; 7 wickets	12-14 Jul; Kent; 5 wickets			27–30 May; Match drawn	9-11 Aug; Kent; 9 wickets	26-28 Jul; Warwickshire; 4 wickets		
Lancashire	9-12 Sep; Match drawn	5-7 Jul; Match drawn	17-20 Jun; Match drawn			31 May-2 Jun; Lancashire; 5 wickets				1-4 Jul; Match drawn	12-15 Aug; Match drawn		10–12 May; Match drawn	8-11 Jul; Match drawn	17–19 May; Warwickshire inns & 41 runs		29 Jul-1 Aug; Lancashire inns & 34 runs
Leicestershire	29 Jul-1 Aug; Match drawn	26-29 Aug; Leicestershire; 7 wickets		31 May-2 Jun; Leicestershire; 123 runs		10–12 May; Match drawn	21-23 Jun; Match drawn			8-11 Jul; Match drawn	24-27 Jun; Match drawn		10-13 Jun; Leicestershire; 6 wickets		30 Aug-1 Sep; Match drawn		12-15 Aug; Match drawn
Middlesex	19-22 Aug; Middlesex inns & 61 runs				10-13 Jun; Hampshire; 5 wickets	29 Jul-1 Aug; Match drawn	15-18 Aug; Middlesex; 7 wickets	3–5 May; Match drawn		9-10 Aug; Northamptonshire inns & 65 runs	24–26 May; Match drawn		5-8 Aug; Match drawn	27–30 May; Middlesex; 9 wickets			7-9 Jun; Match drawn
Northamptonshire		10–12 May; Northamptonshire; 5 wickets		17–19 May; Gloucestershire; 6 wickets	27–30 May; Hampshire; 5 wickets			19-22 Aug; Match drawn			17-20 Jun; Northamptonshire; 9 wickets	12-15 Aug; Match drawn	24-27 Jun; Match drawn		24–26 May; Match drawn	29 Jul-1 Aug; Match drawn	15-18 Jul; Northamptonshire; 151 runs
Nottinghamshire	8-11 Jul; Match drawn	31 May-2 Jun; Match drawn			29 Jul-1 Aug; Match drawn	21-23 Jun; Match drawn	19-22 Aug; Match drawn	27–30 May; Leicestershire; 105 runs				17–19 May; Match drawn			9-12 Sep; Warwickshire; 4 wickets	23-25 Aug; Worcestershire; 4 wickets	1-4 Jul; Match drawn
Somerset		24-27 Jun; Match drawn	29 Jul-1 Aug; Match drawn	19-22 Aug; Match drawn		26-29 Aug; Match drawn	9-11 Aug; Match drawn	26-28 Jul; Leicestershire; 83 runs	10–12 May; Match drawn	21-23 Jun; Match drawn					5-8 Aug; Match drawn		24–26 May; Match drawn
Surrey	15-18 Jul; Match drawn		23-25 Aug; Match drawn		12-14 Jul; Surrey; 126 runs	17-20 Jun; Match drawn			1-4 Jul; Match drawn		26-29 Aug; Surrey; 21 runs	31 May-2 Jun; Somerset inns & 8 runs		29 Jul-1 Aug; Match drawn		17–19 May; Match drawn	26-27 Jul; Surrey inns & 12 runs
Sussex		3–5 May; Match drawn			19-22 Aug; Hampshire; 156 runs	1-4 Jul; Sussex; 10 wickets		23-25 Aug; Sussex; 7 wickets	26-29 Aug; Middlesex; 3 wickets	7-9 Jun; Northamptonshire; 9 wickets	26-28 Jul; Match drawn	15-18 Jul; Somerset; 110 runs	12-15 Aug; Match drawn			17-20 Jun; Match drawn	
Warwickshire	6-8 Sep; Match drawn		8-11 Jul; Warwickshire; 8 wickets	29 Jul-1 Aug; Match drawn			12-14 Jul; Warwickshire; 35 runs		17-20 Jun; Warwickshire; 10 wickets	31 May-2 Jun; Match drawn	9-11 Aug; Warwickshire; 9 wickets		19-22 Aug; Warwickshire; 9 wickets	10–12 May; Match drawn		1-4 Jul; Match drawn	
Worcestershire	27–30 May; Worcestershire; 87 runs	22-25 Jul; Essex; 90 runs	19-21 Aug; Worcestershire inns & 23 runs	24-27 Jun; Match drawn		12-15 Aug; Kent; 3 wickets	26-28 Jul; Match drawn	15-18 Jul; Worcestershire; 44 runs	31 May-2 Jun; Match drawn			3–5 May; Match drawn			10-13 Jun; Match drawn		
Yorkshire	10-13 Jun; Match drawn		31 May-2 Jun; Yorkshire inns & 124 runs	10–12 May; Yorkshire; 126 runs		30-31 Aug; Kent inns & 81 runs	27–30 May; Match drawn		23-25 Aug; Yorkshire; 98 runs				9-11 Aug; Yorkshire; 9 wickets	5-8 Aug; Match drawn	24-27 Jun; Match drawn	8-11 Jul; Match drawn	

Home team won	Visiting team won	Match drawn

== Records ==
=== Batting ===
Most runs
Aggregate	Average	Player	County
1,743	60.10	Mushtaq Mohammad	Northamptonshire
1,649	51.53	Glenn Turner	Worcestershire
1,644	68.50	Keith Fletcher	Essex
1,438	47.93	Roger Prideaux	Sussex
1,437	59.87	Rohan Kanhai	Warwickshire
1,417	48.86	David Steele	Northamptonshire

=== Bowling ===
Most wickets
Aggregate	Average	Player	County
93	18.65	Tom Cartwright	Somerset
93	20.33	Barry Stead	Nottinghamshire
80	19.27	Keith Boyce	Essex
76	21.00	Vanburn Holder	Worcestershire
75	18.13	John Dye	Northamptonshire
75	21.52	Bob Herman	Hampshire
