= Matthew Engel =

British writer, journalist, and editor (born 1951)

Matthew Lewis Engel (born 11 June 1951) is a British writer, journalist and editor.

== Early life and education ==
Engel was born in Northampton, son of solicitor Max David Engel (1912–2005) and Betty Ruth (née Lesser). His grandfather had escaped antisemitic persecution in Poland.

He was educated at Great Houghton Prep School, Carmel College, Oxfordshire, and Manchester University.

== Career ==
He began his career in 1972 as a staff journalist on The Guardian newspaper for nearly 25 years, reporting on a wide range of political and sporting events including a period as Washington correspondent beginning on 9/11. He later wrote columns in the Financial Times and now contributes to both these papers. Engel edited the 1993–2000 and 2004–2007 editions of Wisden Cricketers' Almanack, with a short break when he worked in the US. He has been a strong critic of the International Cricket Council, international cricket's ruling body.

Engel was the visiting professor of media at the University of Oxford for 2011.

He was elected as a councillor for Herefordshire in October 2023 in a by-election for Golden Valley South ward.

== Personal life ==
Engel lives on an old farm in Herefordshire. In 1990, he married former editorial director at Pan Books Hilary, daughter of Laurence Davies. They had a son, Laurie, and adopted a daughter, Victoria (Vika), from Russia. Laurie died of cancer in 2005, aged 13, and Engel set up a successful charity fund in his memory, the Laurie Engel Fund, which has raised more than £1.2m in partnership with the Teenage Cancer Trust to build a new unit for patients in Birmingham (opened 2010) and for a cancer centre scheduled for 2018. The proceeds of a book he wrote, Extracts from the Red Notebooks (Macmillan), are donated to this fund. His book, That’s The Way It Crumbles: The American Conquest of the English Language (Profile Books) was published in June 2017.

== Works ==
- The Reign - Life in Elizabeth's Britain: Part I: The Way It Was, 1952-79 (Atlantic Books, 2022) ISBN 978-1-786-49667-6
- That’s The Way It Crumbles: The American Conquest of the English Language (Profile Books, 2017) ISBN 978-1-78125-668-8
- Engel's England: thirty-nine counties, one capital and one man (Profile Books, 2014) ISBN 978-1-84668-571-2
- Eleven Minutes Late: A Train Journey to the Soul of Britain (Macmillan, May 2009) ISBN 978-0-230-70898-3
- Extracts from the Red Notebooks (Macmillan, 2007) ISBN 978-0-330-44954-0 and his Financial Times column about it
- The Bedside Years: The Best Writing from the Guardian 1951–2000 (Atlantic, 2001) ASIN B000Y11LQW
- Tickle The Public: One Hundred Years of the Popular Press (Orion, 1996) ISBN 978-0-575-06143-9, paperback (Phoenix, 1997) ISBN 978-0-575-40083-2
- Thirty Obituaries from Wisden (editor) (Penguin Books Ltd, 1996) ISBN 978-0-14-600248-9
- The History of Northamptonshire CCC (County Cricket History) (with Andrew Radd) (Christopher Helm Publishers Ltd, 1993) ISBN 978-0-7136-8024-9
- Sports writer's eye: an anthology (Queen Anne Press, 1989) ISBN 978-0-356-17844-8
- The Guardian Book of Cricket (Pavilion Books, 1986) ISBN 978-1-85145-060-2 (Penguin Books, 1987) ISBN 978-0-14-010445-5
- Ashes '85 Pelham Books, 1985) ISBN 978-0-7207-1645-0
- Wisden Cricketers' Almanack (editor) (John Wisden & Co Ltd)
  - 2007 ISBN 978-1-905625-02-4, paperback ISBN 978-1-905625-03-1, large print ISBN 978-1-905625-05-5
  - 2006 ISBN 978-0-947766-98-6, paperback ISBN 978-0-947766-99-3
  - 2005 ISBN 978-0-947766-89-4, paperback ISBN 978-0-947766-90-0
  - 2004 ISBN 978-0-947766-83-2, paperback ISBN 978-0-947766-84-9, audio ISBN 978-1-84032-857-8
  - 2000/The Millennium Edition ISBN 978-0-947766-57-3, paperback ISBN 978-0-947766-58-0
  - 1999 ISBN 978-0-947766-50-4, paperback ISBN 978-0-947766-51-1
  - 1998 ISBN 978-0-947766-44-3, paperback ISBN 978-0-947766-45-0
  - 1997 ISBN 978-0-947766-38-2, paperback ISBN 978-0-947766-39-9
  - 1996 ISBN 978-0-947766-31-3, paperback ISBN 978-0-947766-32-0
  - 1995 ISBN 978-0-947766-24-5, paperback ISBN 978-0-947766-25-2
  - 1994 ISBN 978-0-947766-22-1, paperback ISBN 978-0-947766-23-8
  - 1993 ISBN 978-0-947766-20-7, paperback ISBN 978-0-947766-21-4
- The Sportspages Almanac: Complete Sporting Factbook (with Ian Morrison) (Simon & Schuster Ltd)
  - 1992 ISBN 978-0-671-71080-4
  - 1991 ISBN 978-0-671-71600-4
  - 1990 ISBN 978-0-671-65314-9
