= Stephen Rouse =

Welsh cricketer (born 1949)

Stephen John Rouse (born 20 January 1949 in Glamorgan) is a former first-class cricketer for Warwickshire. A left-arm pace bowler, Rouse took 270 wickets at 30.78 in his 127-game career.

Rouse was the groundsman at Edgbaston until the end of the 2011 English season.
