= Benson & Hedges Cup =

Cricket competition

- Countries: England and Wales
- Administrator: England & Wales Cricket Board
- Format: Limited overs cricket
- First edition: 1972
- Latest edition: 2002
- Most successful: Lancashire (4 titles)

The Benson & Hedges Cup was a one-day cricket competition for first-class counties in England and Wales that was held from 1972 to 2002, one of cricket's longest sponsorship deals.

It was the third major one-day competition established in England and Wales after the Sunday League and the Gillette Cup. Traditionally a 'big day out' for the finalist's supporters, it was the less prestigious of the two cups. It began as a 55 over a side game, but was later reduced to 50. The winning team in the first cup final in 1972, Leicestershire won £2,500, the losing finalists Yorkshire £1,000 and Chris Balderstone, winner of the man of the match – the coveted 'Gold Award' – £100.

== Format ==
Twenty teams were organised into four zonal groups in its original format with the games played at the start of the season in May. The (then) seventeen first-class counties were joined by three other teams, Minor Counties (North), Minor Counties (South) and Cambridge University who alternated with the University of Oxford. Each team played the others in the group, the winners of each game awarded three points plus, in its first year, a bonus point for bowling their opponents out. The first two teams in each group went on to contest a quarter-final knock-out stage. Groups were set up to create 'derby' games.

in 1975, the Oxford and Cambridge university sides combined to form an Oxford & Cambridge team which competed in every season thereafter. In 1976 the groupings were reorganised to remove the geographical element and the Minor Counties were divided into East and West instead of North and South. Scotland entered the competition in 1980 and the Minor Counties were reduced to one combined team. Durham joined the competition in 1992, having become a first-class county; Ireland joined in 1994 and the competition was streamlined to a straight knock-out cup. Mike Atherton's Combined Universities side almost reached the semi-finals in 1989, running Somerset close in the quarter-final thanks to a century from another future England captain, Nasser Hussain. Ireland defeated Middlesex eight years later.

The final was played at Lord's, initially in mid-July, but latterly in late June. Viv Richards of Somerset made the highest score in a final, an unbeaten 132. Ken Higgs of Leicestershire took a hat-trick (Alan Butcher, Pat Pocock and Arnold Long) against Surrey in the final of 1974, but still ended on the losing side. Other notable performances in its later days include Mark Alleyne's century for Gloucestershire in 1999, 112 from Aravinda de Silva as Kent lost in 1995, and Ben Hollioake's 115-ball 98 for Surrey in 1997. Last-ball or extremely close finishes in the final occurred in 1983 when Middlesex beat Essex, 1986 when Middlesex beat Kent, 1987 when Yorkshire beat Northamptonshire, 1989 when Nottinghamshire beat Essex, and in 1993 when Derbyshire beat Lancashire. In the 1989 final, Eddie Hemmings hit the last ball for a boundary to seal an unlikely victory.

The highest total ever recorded in the group matches was the 388 scored by Essex against Scotland in 1992. Graham Gooch scored 127 as Scotland lost by 272 runs. In another tie in 1982 Gooch also recorded the highest individual score in the competition, 198 not out.

At the Worcestershire v Somerset, 1979 B&H Cup group game at Worcester on 24 May 1979, the Somerset captain Brian Rose declared after one over with the score at 1 for 0. Worcestershire scored the required 2 runs in 10 balls. The declaration was done to protect Somerset's run-rate so they could qualify for the next round. After a special TCCB vote, Somerset were ejected from the competition for bringing the game into disrepute.

== Abolition ==
A ban on tobacco advertising deprived the cup of its sponsor and it was wound up in 2002 in favour of the Twenty20 Cup, first held the following year. The format of the Friends Provident Trophy echoed the Benson and Hedges Cup as teams competed in a group stage before going on to knockout rounds.

The umpires in the last final had faced each other as players in the first final 30 years before: John Hampshire for Yorkshire and Barry Dudleston for Leicestershire.

== Finals ==
Year	Final		
Year	Winner	Result	Runner-up
1972	Leicestershire; 140 for 5 (46.5 overs)	Leicestershire won by 5 wickets Scorecard	Yorkshire; 136 for 9 (55 overs)
1973	Kent; 225 for 7 (55 overs)	Kent won by 39 runs Scorecard	Worcestershire; 186 (51.4 overs)
1974	Surrey; 170 (54.1 overs)	Surrey won by 27 runs Scorecard	Leicestershire; 143 (54 overs)
1975	Leicestershire; 150 for 5 (51.2 overs)	Leicestershire won by 5 wickets Scorecard	Middlesex; 146 (52.4 overs)
1976	Kent; 236 for 7 (55 overs)	Kent won by 43 runs Scorecard	Worcestershire; 193 (52.4 overs)
1977	Gloucestershire; 237 for 6 (55 overs)	Gloucestershire won by 41 runs Scorecard	Kent; 173 (47.3 overs)
1978	Kent; 151 for 4 (41.4 overs)	Kent won by 6 wickets Scorecard	Derbyshire; 147 (54.4 overs)
1979	Essex; 290 for 6 (55 overs)	Essex won by 35 runs Scorecard	Surrey; 255 (51.4 overs)
1980	Northamptonshire; 209 (54.5 overs)	Northamptonshire won by 6 runs Scorecard	Essex; 203 for 8 (55 overs)
1981	Somerset; 197 for 3 (44.3 overs)	Somerset won by 7 wickets Scorecard	Surrey; 194 (55 overs)
1982	Somerset; 132 for 1 (33.1 overs)	Somerset won by 9 wickets Scorecard	Nottinghamshire; 130 (50.1 overs)
1983	Middlesex; 196 for 8 (55 overs)	Middlesex won by 4 runs Scorecard	Essex; 192 (54.1 overs)
1984	Lancashire; 140 for 4 (42.4 overs)	Lancashire won by 6 wickets Scorecard	Warwickshire; 139 (50.4 overs)
1985	Leicestershire; 215 for 5 (52 overs)	Leicestershire won by 5 wickets Scorecard	Essex; 213 for 8 (55 overs)
1986	Middlesex; 199 for 7 (55 overs)	Middlesex won by 2 runs Scorecard	Kent; 197 for 8 (55 overs)
1987	Yorkshire; 244 for 6 (55 overs)	Yorkshire won by losing fewer wickets Scorecard	Northamptonshire; 244 for 7 (55 overs)
1988	Hampshire; 118 for 3 (31.5 overs)	Hampshire won by 7 wickets Scorecard	Derbyshire; 117 (46.3 overs)
1989	Nottinghamshire; 244 for 7 (55 overs)	Nottinghamshire won by 3 wickets Scorecard	Essex; 243 for 7 (55 overs)
1990	Lancashire; 241 for 8 (55 overs)	Lancashire won by 69 runs Scorecard	Worcestershire; 172 (54 overs)
1991	Worcestershire; 236 for 8 (55 overs)	Worcestershire won by 65 runs Scorecard	Lancashire; 171 (47.2 overs)
1992	Hampshire; 253 for 5 (55 overs)	Hampshire won by 41 runs Scorecard	Kent; 212 (52.3 overs)
1993	Derbyshire; 252 for 6 (55 overs)	Derbyshire won by 6 runs Scorecard	Lancashire; 246 for 7 (55 overs)
1994	Warwickshire; 172 for 4 (44.2 overs)	Warwickshire won by 6 wickets Scorecard	Worcestershire; 170 for 9 (55 overs)
1995	Lancashire; 274 for 7 (55 overs)	Lancashire won by 35 runs Scorecard	Kent; 239 (52.1 overs)
1996	Lancashire; 245 for 9 (50 overs)	Lancashire won by 31 runs Scorecard	Northamptonshire; 214 (48.3 overs)
1997	Surrey; 215 for 2 (45 overs)	Surrey won by 8 wickets Scorecard	Kent; 212 for 9 (50 overs)
1998	Essex; 268 for 7 (50 overs)	Essex won by 192 runs Scorecard	Leicestershire; 76 (27.4 overs)
1999	Gloucestershire; 291 for 9 (50 overs)	Gloucestershire won by 124 runs Scorecard	Yorkshire; 167 (40 overs)
2000	Gloucestershire; 226 for 3 (46.5 overs)	Gloucestershire won by 7 wickets Scorecard	Glamorgan; 225 (49.3 overs)
2001	Surrey; 244 (49.5 overs)	Surrey won by 47 runs Scorecard	Gloucestershire; 197 (45.5 overs)
2002	Warwickshire; 182 for 5 (36.2 overs)	Warwickshire won by 5 wickets Scorecard	Essex; 181 for 8 (50 overs)

== Wins summary ==
- 4 Lancashire
- 3 Gloucestershire, Kent, Leicestershire, Surrey
- 2 Essex, Hampshire, Middlesex, Somerset, Warwickshire
- 1 Derbyshire, Northamptonshire, Nottinghamshire, Worcestershire, Yorkshire.

== Records ==
- Highest Total – 388–7 Essex v Scotland at Chelmsford 1992
- Highest Total Batting Second – 318–5 Lancashire v Leicestershire at Manchester 1995
- Lowest Total – 50 Hampshire v Yorkshire at Leeds 1991
- Highest Score – 198* Graham Gooch for Essex v Sussex at Hove 1982
- Best Bowling – 7–12 Wayne Daniel for Middlesex v Minor Counties East at Ipswich 1978
- Most Wicketkeeper dismissals in an innings – 8 (all caught) Derek Taylor for Somerset v Combined Universities at Taunton 1982

== See also ==
- Benson & Hedges
- County Championship
- Minor Counties
