= John Steele (cricketer, born 1946) =

English cricketer (born 1946)

Personal information
- Full name: John Frederick Steele
- Born: 23 July 1946 (age 80); Brown Edge, Staffordshire, England
- Batting: Right-handed
- Bowling: Slow left-arm orthodox
- Relatives: David Steele (brother)

Domestic team information
- Years: Team
- 1965–1969: Staffordshire
- 1970–1983: Leicestershire
- 1973/74–1977/78: Natal
- 1984–1986: Glamorgan

Umpiring information
- WTests umpired: 1 (1999)
- WODIs umpired: 4 (2004–2011)

Career statistics
Competition	First-class	List A
Matches	379	302
Runs scored	15,054	3,532
Batting average	28.95	20.89
100s/50s	21/70	1/14
Top score	195	108*
Balls bowled	39,292	12,434
Wickets	584	293
Bowling average	27.04	25.54
5 wickets in innings	16	4
10 wickets in match	0	0
Best bowling	7/29	5/11
Catches/stumpings	414/–	146/–
- Source: CricketArchive, 11 September 2013

John Frederick Steele (born 23 July 1946) is a former English first-class cricketer for Leicestershire and Glamorgan. An allrounder who bowled left-arm spin, he made 15,054 runs and took 584 wickets in his career which started in 1970 and ended in 1986.

His elder brother David played Test cricket for England.

Steele was one of ten members of Leicestershire's first County Championship winning team in 1975 to have a road in Leicester named after him by the city council. Chris Balderstone, Peter Booth, Brian Davison, Barry Dudleston, Ken Higgs, David Humphries, Ray Illingworth, Norman McVicker and Roger Tolchard were the others.
