= Roger Twose =

New Zealand cricketer

Personal information
- Full name: Roger Graham Twose
- Born: 17 April 1968 (age 58); Torquay, England
- Batting: Left-handed
- Bowling: Right-arm medium
- Role: Batsman

International information
- National side: New Zealand (1995–2001)
- Test debut (cap 194): 25 October 1995 v India
- Last Test: 19 August 1999 v England
- ODI debut (cap 95): 15 November 1995 v India
- Last ODI: 28 February 2001 v Pakistan

Domestic team information
- Years: Team
- 1988: Devon
- 1989–1995: Warwickshire
- 1989/90: Northern Districts
- 1991/92–1993/94: Central Districts
- 1994/95–2000/01: Wellington

Career statistics
| Competition | Test | ODI | FC | LA |
|---|---|---|---|---|
| Matches | 16 | 87 | 178 | 333 |
| Runs scored | 628 | 2,717 | 9,802 | 9,102 |
| Batting average | 25.12 | 38.81 | 36.98 | 34.60 |
| 100s/50s | 0/6 | 1/20 | 18/53 | 11/57 |
| Top score | 94 | 103 | 277* | 124* |
| Balls bowled | 211 | 272 | 9,130 | 5,998 |
| Wickets | 3 | 4 | 133 | 160 |
| Bowling average | 43.33 | 58.75 | 31.85 | 26.87 |
| 5 wickets in innings | 0 | 0 | 2 | 1 |
| 10 wickets in match | 0 | 0 | 0 | 0 |
| Best bowling | 2/36 | 2/31 | 6/28 | 5/30 |
| Catches/stumpings | 5/– | 37/– | 96/– | 120/– |
Medal record
Men's cricket
Representing New Zealand
ICC Champions Trophy
| Winner | 2000 Kenya |
- Source: Cricinfo, 7 September 2018

Roger Graham Twose /ˈtuːz/ (born 17 April 1968) is an English-born New Zealand former cricketer, who played 16 Test matches and 87 One Day Internationals for New Zealand in the mid-1990s. In February 2021, Twose was appointed as the director of New Zealand Cricket. Twose was a member of the New Zealand team that won the 2000 ICC KnockOut Trophy.

== Early life and education ==
Twose was born in Torquay in England. He was educated at King's College, Taunton.

== International career ==
After playing for Warwickshire County Cricket Club, Twose moved to play for Northern Districts in New Zealand in 1991–92. Later, he captained Central Districts and played for Wellington as well. Twose performed well in New Zealand for several seasons, eventually being selected for a national cap on New Zealand's 1995 tour to India.

In the 1998/1999 season, Twose returned to the New Zealand team and soon became recognised as one of the best one day batsmen in the world, known as "the switch-hitter". Twose followed strong performances against India and South Africa by being New Zealand's most successful batsman at the 1999 Cricket World Cup, scoring 318 runs at an average of 79.50.

Following his retirement from Test cricket, Twose continued to perform consistently in the One Day International arena, rising to 2nd in the world batting rankings. He reached his peak on New Zealand's 2000 tour of South Africa when he finally scored his first and only century after 75 matches. His performances resulted in one of New Zealand cricket's cult mantras "We need sixes, fours and Twose to win". His blistering innings of 87 against Pakistan in the 2000 ICC KnockOut Trophy semi final allowed New Zealand to defeat a strong looking Pakistan, and he also contributed to their win against India in the Final. New Zealand seized that year's Champion's Trophy to win their first major ICC Tournament.
