= Jack Birkenshaw =

English cricketer (born 1940)

Personal information
- Full name: Jack Birkenshaw
- Born: 13 November 1940 (age 85); Rothwell, Leeds, Yorkshire, England
- Batting: Left-handed
- Bowling: Right-arm off-break

International information
- National side: England
- Test debut: 25 January 1973 v India
- Last Test: 5 April 1974 v West Indies

Umpiring information
- Tests umpired: 2 (1986–1988)
- ODIs umpired: 6 (1983–1988)

Career statistics
| Competition | Test | First-class | LA |
|---|---|---|---|
| Matches | 5 | 490 | 163 |
| Runs scored | 148 | 12,780 | 1,831 |
| Batting average | 21.14 | 23.57 | 17.95 |
| 100s/50s | 0/1 | 4/53 | 1/6 |
| Top score | 64 | 131 | 101* |
| Balls bowled | 1,017 | 69,171 | 3,046 |
| Wickets | 13 | 1,073 | 82 |
| Bowling average | 36.07 | 27.28 | 25.70 |
| 5 wickets in innings | 1 | 44 | 1 |
| 10 wickets in match | 0 | 4 | 0 |
| Best bowling | 5/57 | 8/94 | 5/20 |
| Catches/stumpings | 3/– | 316/– | 56/– |
- Source: ESPNcricinfo, 19 August 2019

Jack Birkenshaw, MBE (born 13 November 1940) is a former English cricketer, who later stood as an umpire and worked as a coach. Cricket writer Colin Bateman stated, "Jack Birkenshaw was the epitome of a good all-round county cricketer: a probing off-spinner who used flight and guile, a handy batsman who could grind it out or go for the slog, a dependable fielder and great competitor."

== Lean times at Yorkshire and Leicestershire ==
Born on 13 November 1940, in Rothwell, near Leeds, Yorkshire, Birkenshaw attended John Lawrence cricket school at Rothwell from the age of seven, and when aged 14 he appeared for Rothwell Grammar School and Yorkshire Schools. He was also a stand-off in the school rugby team. He played cricket for Lofthouse, Farsley and Leeds.

Birkenshaw played a single County Championship match for Yorkshire at the age of 17 in 1958, taking the wicket of Jim Parks in both innings, but did not make another first-class appearance until 1959. That year he took 40 wickets at an average of 27.39, and also played for Minor Counties against the touring Indians; he made a second and final Minor Counties appearance against the South Africans the following year. In all, he played thirty games for Yorkshire, but failed to win his county cap, and in 1961 he moved on to Leicestershire.

For a long while Birkenshaw's performances for Leicestershire were rather disappointing. In his first six years at the club he never took more than 27 wickets in a season, and he had to rely on some useful lower-order contributions with the bat to keep his place in the side. He earned a place in the history books by playing (exclusively as a batsman) in the pioneering Midlands Knock-Out Cup limited-overs tournament in 1962. However, he was capped by the county in 1965, and greater success was lying ahead.

== Breakthrough and England recognition ==
In 1967, Birkenshaw took 111 wickets – in the previous six seasons combined he had managed 102 in total – at an average of only 21.41. He took five in an innings on five occasions, including 7–86 against Sussex, and gained selection for the International XI that toured Pakistan in the winter. 1968 proved another good season for Birkenshaw, as he again took 100 wickets, and punished Sussex again: this time with the bat as he made 101 not out. He made two more centuries the following year, but surprisingly for a man who passed fifty on 57 occasions in first-class cricket, he was to reach three figures just once more in his career. The years between 1969 and 1972 saw Birkenshaw record solid statistics, taking 69, 63, 89 and 90 wickets in successive seasons, and in 1972 he achieved his career-best bowling of 8–94 against Somerset.

Such performances attracted the interest of the England selectors, who had previously stuck by Ray Illingworth as their first-choice off-spinner, and Birkenshaw was picked to go to India and Pakistan in 1972/73. He made 64 on his debut in the fourth Test against India at Kanpur, and also claimed three wickets; his first victim in Test cricket was Sunil Gavaskar. Birkenshaw retained his place for the fifth Test at Bombay, and opened the batting in the second innings, but lost his place for the Pakistan series and played only in the third Test, taking 5–55 and sharing the second-innings wickets equally with Norman Gifford.

Despite another decent domestic season in 1973, Birkenshaw was omitted from the England side for both series that summer (against New Zealand and West Indies), the 41-year-old Illingworth again being the barrier to his selection. However, there was no Illingworth on the winter tour to the Caribbean, and Birkenshaw played in the last two Tests. A total return of 2–96 and 15 runs in three innings was not enough to keep his place for the summer of 1974, and that was as far as his England career lasted.

== Later career and retirement ==
He played on for Leicestershire for a number of years, helping them win the County Championship in 1975, making his fourth and final first-class hundred, and recording his best bowling figures in one-day cricket, taking 5–20 against Essex in the Sunday League. Oddly, these were the only wickets he took in the 11 one-day games he played that year. In 1976, Birkenshaw made his only one-day hundred, but his unbeaten 101 against Hampshire in the second round of the Gillette Cup failed to win the game, Leicestershire falling short of their target by three runs.

Birkenshaw finished with Leicestershire in 1980, but had one final season in the game with Worcestershire. In his penultimate match he made 32 and 54 against the Australian tourists, and his final first-class match came in late July 1981 against Northamptonshire. The first wicket of his first-class career had been that of a famous Test player, and with a pleasing symmetry the last was to be too: Kapil Dev, caught behind for 79. This match was also notable for being the first first-class game to be held at Stourbridge in 19 years.

After retirement, Birkenshaw became an umpire, standing in over 250 matches from 1982 to 1988 including two Tests and six One Day Internationals, four of the latter being at the 1983 World Cup. His last game as an umpire was the Refuge Assurance Cup final in September 1988. He later returned to his old county of Leicestershire as a coach, after a similar spell at Somerset. As coach, he led Leicestershire to the County Championship title in 1996 and 1998. He was elected President of Leicestershire County Cricket Club, initially at the 2019 AGM.

Birkenshaw was appointed Member of the Order of the British Empire (MBE) in the 2011 Birthday Honours for services to cricket.
