= Mick Norman =

English cricketer

Personal information
- Full name: Michael Eric John Charles Norman
- Born: 19 January 1933 (age 93); Northampton, Northamptonshire, England
- Batting: Right-handed
- Bowling: Right-arm leg-spin
- Role: Batsman

Domestic team information
- Years: Team
- 1952–1965: Northamptonshire
- 1966–1975: Leicestershire

Career statistics
Competition	First-class	List A
Matches	363	120
Runs scored	17,441	2,412
Batting average	29.26	25.65
100s/50s	24/80	0/11
Top score	221*	90*
Balls bowled	190	–
Wickets	2	–
Bowling average	82.00	–
5 wickets in innings	0	–
10 wickets in match	0	–
Best bowling	2/0	–
Catches/stumpings	161/–	30/–
- Source: CricketArchive, 16 June 2010

Michael Eric John Charles Norman (born 19 January 1933) is a former professional cricketer who played for Northamptonshire and Leicestershire. He was born at Northampton in 1933.

== Career ==
Norman's first-class debut, against India in 1952, coincided with that of Frank Tyson, who regarded the young Northampton Grammar School old boy as "another Dennis Brookes in the making". It took several seasons for Norman to establish himself in the first team. A Catholic, he spent two years in a seminary before finally deciding on a cricket career.

In 1959, Brookes' last season, Norman made his presence felt with just over 1,000 runs and a maiden Championship century against Warwickshire. The following year, when he established a long-running opening partnership with Brian Reynolds, Norman "improved immensely", according to the club's Annual Report, and the four summers between 1960 and 1963 brought him 7,150 county runs. His four hundreds in 1963 included 152 against Nottinghamshire at Northampton, his highest for the county. However, in the next two seasons he struggled for consistency. Against Glamorgan in 1964 he suffered the miserable experience of a king pair (falling to the first ball of each innings) in one day, to Ossie Wheatley each time.

At the end of 1965 Norman moved to Leicestershire and enjoyed a new lease of cricketing life. He played on until 1975, combining cricket with teaching in the last few years of his career. He adapted with conspicuous success to the rough-and-tumble of the John Player League which Leicestershire won, with Norman's help, in 1974.

In the 1976–77 season, Norman was a member of the MCC team that was the first international cricket team to tour Bangladesh.
