= Graham McKenzie =

Australian cricketer

Personal information
- Full name: Graham Douglas McKenzie
- Born: 24 June 1941 (age 85); Cottesloe, Perth, Western Australia
- Height: 183 cm (6 ft 0 in)
- Batting: Right-handed
- Bowling: Right-arm fast
- Role: Bowler
- Relatives: Eric McKenzie (father); Douglas McKenzie (uncle)

International information
- National side: Australia
- Test debut (cap 220): 22 June 1961 v England
- Last Test: 9 January 1971 v England
- Only ODI (cap 5): 5 January 1971 v England

Domestic team information
- Years: Team
- 1959/60–1973/74: Western Australia
- 1969–1975: Leicestershire
- 1979/80: Transvaal

Career statistics
Competition	Test	ODI	FC	LA
Matches	60	1	383	151
Runs scored	945	–	5,662	519
Batting average	12.27	–	15.64	11.28
100s/50s	0/2	–	0/18	0/0
Top score	76	–	76	41*
Balls bowled	17,681	60	76,780	7,515
Wickets	246	2	1,219	217
Bowling average	29.78	11.00	26.96	19.55
5 wickets in innings	16	0	49	3
10 wickets in match	3	0	5	0
Best bowling	8/71	2/22	8/71	5/15
Catches/stumpings	34/0	1/0	201/0	38/0
- Source: CricketArchive, 3 February 2009

Graham Douglas McKenzie (born 24 June 1941) – commonly known as "Garth", after the comic strip hero – is an Australian cricketer who played for Western Australia (1960–74), Leicestershire (1969–75), Transvaal (1979–80) and Australia (1961–71) and was a Wisden Cricketer of the Year in 1965. He succeeded Alan Davidson as Australia's premier fast bowler and was in turn succeeded by Dennis Lillee, playing with both at either end of his career. McKenzie was particularly noted for his muscular physique (hence his nickname) and ability to take wickets on good batting tracks. His father Eric McKenzie and uncle Douglas McKenzie also played cricket for Western Australia. Garth was chosen for the Ashes tour of England in 1961 aged only 20. He made his debut in the Second Test at Lord's, where his 5/37 (including the last three wickets in 12 balls) wrapped up the England innings to give Australia a 5-wicket victory.

== Early years ==
McKenzie grew up in a sporting family. His father, Eric McKenzie, was an opening batsman who played once for Western Australia, against the touring South African cricket team in 1931–32. His uncle, Douglas McKenzie, was a batsman who represented Western Australia on several occasions, scoring 88 in his last game against Lindsay Hassett's Services team in 1945–46. Douglas went on to become President of the Western Australian Cricket Association. Both Douglas and Eric also represented Western Australia in field hockey.

In his youth, McKenzie was an all rounder, batting right-handed and bowling off spin. Aged twelve, he gained selection for Western Australia in the 1953–54 under-14 interstate competition held at Adelaide, but the team withdrew after a polio epidemic in Western Australia. The next season, he captained the state when the competition was held in Perth, leading his team to the championship.

McKenzie attended John Curtin High School, where he performed well with both bat and ball in the school's first XI. At sixteen he made his first grade debut for Claremont-Cottesloe as a batsman, but after unproductive performances was dropped to the second XI. The following year in 1958–59, he continued in second grade and took up fast bowling, taking 50 wickets at an average of 14.50 after his team had a pace bowling shortage. He was recalled to the First XI in 1959–60. He finished the season with 515 runs at an average of 39.46 and 49 wickets at an average of 11.21. His efforts were rewarded when the state selectors handed him a debut for the penultimate match of the Sheffield Shield season against Victoria in Melbourne. He went wicketless and scored 22 and 41. He took his first wickets in the final match against South Australia at Perth with 3/69. At season's end, his captain Ken Meuleman advised McKenzie to concentrate on his fast bowling.

== International career ==
The 1960–61 season began with McKenzie's third first-class match, against the West Indies. He did not bowl in the first innings but took 4/41 in the second to seal a 94 run win, prompting West Indies captain Frank Worrell to predict a bright future.

Further strong performances during the Shield season saw him selected at age 19 for the 1961 Ashes tour under Richie Benaud. Following an injury to Benaud, Australia replaced him with a third seamer, allowing McKenzie to make his debut in the Second Test at Lord's during the "Battle of the Ridge". In his first innings, he made 34 on his twentieth birthday batting at number 10 on a difficult pitch. The last two wickets added 102 and Australia gained a lead of 134. In England's second innings, McKenzie captured the prized wickets of Ted Dexter and Peter May, and took the last three wickets in twelve balls to give 5/37 on debut. Australia went on to win by five wickets. After losing the Third Test at Headingley, Australia won the fourth Test at Old Trafford with McKenzie again making a valuable contribution with the bat. With a lead of only 177 with nine wickets down in the second innings, McKenzie joined Alan Davidson. He held his end for 32 runs while Davidson's powerful hitting saw 98 added for Australia's highest tenth wicket partnership on English soil. This allowed Benaud to bowl Australia to victory on the final day. The youngest member of the touring party, McKenzie was one of eight bowlers to take at least fifty wickets.

When Dexter's Englishmen toured Australia in 1962–63, McKenzie was promoted to share the new ball with Davidson. Playing in all five Tests, he did not trouble the batsmen to the same extent as his partner, taking 20 wickets for 30.95. He was noted for his ability to contain the opposition by bowling long spells. Davidson retired at the end of the series and McKenzie became the pace spearhead when South Africa toured in 1963–64. He was Australia's leading bowler with 16 wickets at 43.06. In the Third Test in Sydney, he hit his highest Test score of 76.

=== Five-wicket hauls ===
McKenzie's international cricket five-wicket hauls
Against	Home	Away
England	3	3
India	1	3
Pakistan	-	1
South Africa	-	3
West Indies	1	1

In cricket, a five-wicket haul (also known as a "five–for" or "fifer") refers to a bowler taking five or more wickets in a single innings. This is regarded as a notable achievement, and as of August 2014 only 23 bowlers have taken at least 20 five-wicket hauls at international level in their cricketing careers.

1964 saw McKenzie make his second Ashes tour of England. He led the attack as Australia retained the Ashes. His 29 wickets in five Tests equalled the highest obtained for Australia in England by Clarrie Grimmett in 1930. He took 21 wickets when Australia visited India and Pakistan on the return journey to Australia. Another seven wickets in a one-off Test against Pakistan in Melbourne in December established a new record for the number of Test wickets in the space of one year; from 11 December 1963 to 8 December 1964 he took 73 wickets in fifteen Tests. This surpassed Maurice Tate's 65 wickets in 1924–25. In this period, he became the youngest bowler to reach 100 wickets, at the age of 23 and 162 days, 139 days younger than A.L. Valentine. He was named as one of the Wisden Cricketers of the Year in 1965, the first Western Australian born recipient.

McKenzie had an unproductive tour of the West Indies in 1964–65, and had mixed fortunes in the 1965–66 Ashes series. He was not selected for the First Test, but took 5/134 in England's mammoth 558 the Second Test at Melbourne. He did little in the Third Test, which Australia lost by an innings, and was one of the five men dropped for the Fourth Test. Fortunately, Peter Allan was injured and McKenzie was brought back into the team. The Adelaide Oval was notoriously flat, but McKenzie was an expert on getting batsmen out on dull wickets and used the humid atmosphere and fresh pitch to bowl Bob Barber for a duck and have John Edrich caught by the ever-reliable Simpson at slip. McKenzie took 6/48 to have England out for 241 and Australia won by an innings. He took 3/17 in the second innings in the Fifth Test to finish with 16 wickets (29.18), the chief wicket taker along with Neil Hawke who took 16 wickets (26.18). Thereafter, McKenzie became one of the most consistent opening bowlers in the world.

He toured South Africa in 1966–67 and in 1967–68 was dropped for the final two Tests after taking his only ten wicket match haul against India. This was speculated to be due to fears that his dominance over the Indian batsmen was diminishing public interest in the series.

In 1968, McKenzie became a full-time cricketer, believing that it would offer him the best chance of financial security. At the time the Australian Cricket Board regarded its players as amateurs and paid them accordingly. McKenzie joined Leicestershire, captained until 1968 by the Western Australian skipper and former England Test stalwart Tony Lock. He took over four hundred wickets for the county and was instrumental in its four One Day Cricket trophies in the early 1970s and winning their first County Championship in 1975.

In 1968–69 he took 30 wickets (25.26) against the visiting West Indies and at 27 became the youngest man to take 200 Test wickets, a record since beaten. Another 21 wickets (21.00) came on the Indian tour of 1968–69, but when the Australian team proceeded to South Africa his form slumped (1/333 in four Tests) and they were whitewashed. It led to suspicions that he had contracted hepatitis. He played in the first four Tests of the 1970–71 Ashes series against England, taking 4/66 in the Second Test at Perth, the first played at the WACA Ground and 2–22 in the first ever One Day International at Melbourne. In the Fourth Test at Sydney McKenzie retired hurt after being hit in the face by a bouncer from John Snow as the England fast bowler took 7–40 in England's 299 run victory. He recovered sufficiently to break Geoff Boycott's forearm in a tour match just before the vital Seventh Test, but was not recalled and was left stranded on 246 Test wickets, two short of Richie Benaud's Australian record. He was only 29 years old.

In his 60 Tests McKenzie took 5 wickets in an innings 16 times, and 10 in a match three times. McKenzie only played one One Day International, the first ODI against England in 1971, in which he took 2/22.

He continued to play for Western Australia until 1974. He came out of retirement in 1977 to play in Kerry Packer's World Series Cricket. After that, he moved his family to South Africa to play in domestic Limited Overs cricket, before returning to Western Australia.

He has the record for taking the most dismissals, hit wicket (4), in Test match history.

In 2010, McKenzie was inducted into the Australian Cricket Hall of Fame.
