= List of Northamptonshire County Cricket Club players =

This is a list in alphabetical order of cricketers who have played for Northamptonshire County Cricket Club (Northants) in top-class matches since 1905, when the club joined the County Championship, and the team was elevated to official first-class status. Northants has been classified as a List A team since the beginning of limited overs cricket in 1963, and as a top-level Twenty20 team since the inauguration of the Twenty20 Cup in 2003.

The details are the player's name followed by the years in which he played for Northants in first-class, List A, or Twenty20 cricket. Note that many players represented other top-class teams besides Northants and that some played for the club in Minor Counties cricket before 1905. Current players are shown as active to the latest season in which they played for the club. The list excludes Second XI and other players who did not play for the club's first team, and players whose first-team appearances were in minor matches only.

Note: Where a player's name is preceded by a † symbol, the article is a redirect to this list.

As of 26 June 2026

== A ==
- Ken Ablack (1946–1949)
- Hylton Ackerman (1967–1971)
- Sidney Adams (1926–1932)
- William Adams (1920–1929)
- Charles Addis (1924–1926)
- Usman Afzaal (2004–2007)
- Ashton Agar (2024)
- Mohammad Akram (1997)
- Antony Allen (1932–1936)
- James Allen (1905)
- Michael Allen (1956–1963)
- Curtly Ambrose (1989–1996)
- Ricaldo Anderson (2002–2004)
- Keith Andrew (1953–1966)
- Norman Andrews (1922–1923)
- Henry Arkell (1921)
- Peter Arnold (1951–1960)
- Martin Ashenden (1959–1961)
- Moin Ashraf (2016)
- Tommy Askham (1914)
- Craig Atkins (1995)
- Bernard Atkinson (1922–1925)
- Azharullah (2013–2019)

== B ==
- Hamer Bagnall (1921–1928)
- Raymond Bailey (1964–1973)
- Rob Bailey (1982–1999)
- Shaun Bailey (2008)
- Toby Bailey (1996–2004)
- Cyril Baker (1906–1922)
- Gavin Baker (2010)
- Thomas Baker (2002–2005)
- Fred Bakewell (1928–1936)
- George Baldwin (1906)
- Kenneth Ball (1921)
- Wilfred Ball (1924–1931)
- Martin Bamber (1982–1984)
- Eldine Baptiste (1991)
- Chad Barrett (2014–2016)
- Desmond Barrick (1949–1960)
- Bill Barron (1946–1951)
- George Bartlett (2024–2025)
- John Bass (1935)
- William Batson (1920–1921)
- Jonathan Batty (2013)
- Temba Bavuma (2019)
- Joseph Beasley (1911–1919)
- Robert Beasley (1907–1911)
- Bishan Singh Bedi (1972–1977)
- Hector Beers (1914–1921)
- Alexander Bell (1934)
- Benjamin Bellamy (1920–1937)
- Harold Benjamin (1928)
- Leo Bennett (1947–1949)
- Howard Bennett (1920)
- Sydney Bennett (1933–1934)
- Gareth Berg (2019–2023)
- Paul Best (2011)
- Frederick Bird (1908–1909)
- John Blain (1997–2003)
- Jack Blatherwick (2019)
- Nicky Boje (2007–2010)
- Christopher Booden (1980–1981)
- Ravi Bopara (2024–2025)
- Peter Borwick (1932)
- Scott Boswell (1995–1998)
- Johan Botha (2011)
- Norman Bowell (1925)
- Mark Bowen (1992–1995)
- Robin Boyd-Moss (1980–1987)
- Doug Bracewell (2018–2019)
- Geoffrey Bradfield (1970)
- Dennis Breakwell (1969–1972)
- Matthew Breetzke (2024–2025)
- Tom Brett (2010–2011)
- Gordon Brice (1949–1952)
- Derek Bridge (1947)
- Justin Broad (2023–2025)
- Vince Broderick (1939–1957)
- Dennis Brookes (1934–1959)
- Jack Brooks (2009–2012)
- Gerard Brophy (2002–2005)
- Freddie Brown (1949–1953)
- Jason Brown (1996–2008)
- Simon Brown (1987–1990)
- William Brown (1925–1937)
- Arush Buchake (2025)
- Nathan Buck (2017–2022)
- Jordan Buckingham (2023)
- Arthur Bull (1913–1924)
- Charles Buller (1931)
- Alec Burgess (1929)
- Henry Burgess (1905)
- Dave Burton (2010–2012)
- John Buswell (1936–1939)
- Walter Buswell (1906–1921)
- Ian Butler (2014)

== C ==
- David Capel (1981–1998)
- James Carse (1983)
- Andy Carter (2017)
- Bob Carter (1978–1982)
- Matthew Cassar (2001–2002)
- Charles Catlow (1929)
- Mike Cawdron (2002–2004)
- Yuzvendra Chahal (2024–2025)
- Frank Chamberlain (1946)
- Maurice Chambers (2014–2015)
- Elton Chigumbura (2010)
- Arthur Childs-Clarke (1947–1948)
- Thomas Clapperton (1909)
- Nobby Clark (1922–1947)
- Bertie Clarke (1946–1949)
- George Clarke (1908)
- Robert Clarke (1947–1957)
- Josh Cobb (2015–2023)
- Kyle Coetzer (2011–2015)
- Matt Coles (2019)
- Gordon Collins (1938)
- Dennis Constable (1949)
- Harry Conway (2025)
- Geoff Cook (1971–1990)
- Jeff Cook (2000–2004)
- Nick Cook (1986–1994)
- Trent Copeland (2013)
- Bernard Cornelius (1947)
- Bob Cottam (1972–1976)
- Ben Cotton (2018)
- Darren Cousins (2000–2002)
- Paul Coverdale (2007)
- Stephen Coverdale (1987)
- Bill Coverdale (1931–1932)
- Arthur Cox (1926–1947)
- Mark Cox (1905–1919)
- Mark HD Cox (1932)
- Sydney Cox (1932)
- Andrew Crook (2007–2008)
- Steven Crook (2005–2018)
- Edmund Crosse (1905–1910)
- Brian Crump (1960–1972)
- Leonard Cullen (1934–1935)
- Ryan Cummins (2009)
- Ben Curran (2018–2022)
- Kevin Curran (1991–1999)
- Geoffrey Cuthbertson (1935–1938)

== D ==
- Lee Daggett (2009–2013)
- Harold Dainty (1922)
- Jack Dale (1922)
- Llewellyn Davies (1919–1921)
- Michael Davies (1997–2000)
- Christian Davis (2010–2013)
- Eddie Davis (1947–1956)
- John Davis (1963)
- Percy Davis (1935–1952)
- Winston Davis (1987–1990)
- Albert Dawes (1933)
- Ismail Dawood (1994)
- Richard Dawson (2007)
- Con de Lange (2012)
- Arthur Denton (1914–1920)
- John Denton (1909–1919)
- William Denton (1909–1924)
- Kapil Dev (1981–1983)
- Alfred Dickens (1907)
- Michael Dilley (1957–1963)
- Buck Divecha (1948)
- Eric Dixon (1939)
- Lancelot Driffield (1905–1908)
- George Drummond (1920–1922)
- Ben Duckett (2012–2018)
- Maurice Dunkley (1937–1939)
- Antony Durose (1964–1969)
- John Dye (1972–1977)

== E ==
- William East (1905–1914)
- Thomas Elderkin (1934)
- Harold Ellis (1908–1910)
- John Emburey (1996–1997)
- Laurie Evans (2016)
- Luke Evans (2010–2012)

== F ==
- Faheem Ashraf (2019)
- Roderick Falconer (1907–1910)
- Sydney Falding (1921)
- Jonathan Fellows-Smith (1957)
- Nigel Felton (1989–1994)
- Kenneth Fiddling (1947–1953)
- Michael Finan (2024)
- Maurice Fitzroy (1925–1927)
- Vincent Flynn (1976–1978)
- David Follett (1997–1999)
- Alan Fordham (1986–1997)
- Grant Forster (1980)
- Michael Foster (1995)
- Edwin Freeman (1908–1920)
- Terry Freeman (1954)
- Matthew Friedlander (2005)
- Charles Fry (1962)
- Philip Fryer (1908)

== G ==
- Sourav Ganguly (2006)
- Gordon Garlick (1948–1950)
- Emilio Gay (2019–2024)
- George Gifford (1923–1929)
- Richard Gleeson (2015–2018)
- Brandon Glover (2020–2022)
- Frederick Goldstein (1969)
- Chris Goode (2004)
- Harry Gouldstone (2020–2023)
- Mark Gouldstone (1986–1988)
- James Govan (1989–1990)
- Douglas Greasley (1950–1955)
- Carl Greenidge (2002–2004)
- Bill Greenwood (1938–1946)
- Jim Griffiths (1974–1986)
- Norman Grimshaw (1933–1938)
- Liam Guthrie (2025)
- John Guy (1958)

== H ==
- Andrew Hall (2008–2014)
- Harold Hall (1907)
- Rupert Hanley (1984)
- David Hardy (1907–1924)
- Roger Harper (1985–1987)
- Calvin Harrison (2025)
- Paul Harrison (2009–2010)
- Ian Harvey (2009)
- Hasan Azad (2023)
- George Hawes (1919)
- Henry Hawkins (1905–1909)
- Rawlins Hawtin (1908–1930)
- Roger Hawtin (1905–1908)
- William Hawtin (1929–1934)
- Matthew Hayden (1999–2000)
- Robert Haywood (1908–1924)
- Freddie Heldreich (2021–2024)
- Eric Herbert (1937–1939)
- Hugh Hibbert (1931)
- Alan Hodgson (1970–1979)
- Dean Hoffman (1988)
- Raymond Hogan (1954–1955)
- Max Holden (2017)
- Jason Holder (2019)
- Ian Holland (2019)
- Lawrence Holland (1912–1920)
- Thomas Horton (1905–1906)
- Ben Howgego (2008–2012)
- Tom Huggins (2003–2005)
- Chesney Hughes (2017)
- John Hughes (1990–1997)
- Stuart Humfrey (1913–1926)
- Gemaal Hussain (2014)
- Mike Hussey (2001–2003)
- Brett Hutton (2018–2020)
- Edward Hyde (1907)

== I ==
- Kevin Innes (1994–2001)
- Matthew Inness (2002)
- Wilfred Izzard (1919–1920)

== J ==
- Davey Jacobs (2007)
- Freddie Jakeman (1949–1954)
- Stuart Jakeman (1962–1963)
- † Arthur James (1906) (Note: Arthur James played two matches for Northants in June 1906. He took two wickets against Warwickshire in his second match, and scored a total of two runs in three innings.)
- Ken James (1935–1939)
- Phil Jaques (2003)
- Craig Jennings (2004)
- Robin Johns (1971)
- George H Johnson (1922–1932)
- George J Johnson (1929–1935)
- John Johnson (1907)
- Laurence Johnson (1958–1972)
- Alfred Jones (1933)
- Steffan Jones (2004–2005)
- Ray Joseph (1985)
- Vallance Jupp (1923–1938)

== K ==
- Siddharth Kaul (2024)
- Harry Kelleher (1956–1958)
- Matthew Kelly (2022)
- William Kemmey (1939)
- Francis Kendall (1930)
- Rob Keogh (2010–2025)
- Simon Kerrigan (2017–2023)
- Michael Kettle (1963–1970)
- James Kettleborough (2014–2017)
- Ralph Kimbell (1908)
- Richard King (2005)
- Sidney King (1907–1908)
- Hubert Kingston (1905–1906)
- William Kingston (1905–1909)
- Frederick Kitson (1919–1920)
- Rory Kleinveldt (2015–2018)
- Lance Klusener (2006–2008)
- Robert Knight (1905–1921)
- Ronald Knight (1933–1934)
- Anil Kumble (1995)

== L ==
- Ronald Lake (1922)
- Allan Lamb (1978–1995)
- John Lamb (1934–1938)
- Tim Lamb (1978–1983)
- Wayne Larkins (1972–1991)
- David Larter (1960–1969)
- Michael Leask (2014)
- Peter Lee (1967–1971)
- Dominic Leech (2023–2025)
- Richard Levi (2013–2021)
- Jake Libby (2016)
- Alan WG Liddell (1951–1955)
- Allan Liddell (1927–1934)
- Albert Lightfoot (1953–1970)
- John Powys, Lord Lilford (1911)
- Dennis Lillee (1988)
- Steven Lines (1983)
- Jock Livingston (1950–1957)
- Richard Logan (1999–2008)
- Harry Longland (1907)
- Johann Louw (2004–2008)
- Martin Love (2004–2005)
- Mal Loye (1991–2011)
- Christopher Lubbock (1938–1939)
- David Lucas (2007–2011)
- Arthur Luck (1937–1938)
- Chris Lynn (2022-2023)

== M ==
- Les McFarlane (1979)
- Lewis McGibbon (1957–1959)
- Lewis McManus (2022–2025)
- Devon Malcolm (1998–2000)
- Neil Mallender (1980–1996)
- Norman Maltby (1972–1974)
- Jack Manning (1954–1960)
- Thomas Manning (1906–1922)
- Austin Matthews (1927–1936)
- Jack Mercer (1947)
- Bill Merritt (1938–1946)
- James Middlebrook (2010–2014)
- Colin Milburn (1960–1974)
- Gus Miller (2022–2025)
- Peter Mills (1981)
- John Minney (1961–1967)
- Richard Montgomerie (1991–1998)
- George Munsey (2015)
- Nigel Murch (1968)
- John Murdin (1913–1927)
- David Murphy (2009–2017)
- Peter Murray-Willis (1938–1946)
- Mushtaq Mohammad (1964–1977)
- Blessing Muzarabani (2019–2020)

== N ==
- Mohammad Nabi (2021)
- Karun Nair (2023–2024)
- Shaikh Nasiruddin (1938–1939)
- Jimmy Neesham (2022)
- André Nel (2003)
- Mark Nelson (2006–2009)
- Peter Nelson (1938)
- Robert Nelson (1937–1939)
- William Nevell (1946–1947)
- Herbert Newman (1905)
- Harold Newton (1938)
- Rob Newton (2009–2019)
- John Nicholson (1924–1928)
- Matthew Nicholson (2006)
- Wayne Noon (1988–1993)
- Mick Norman (1952–1965)
- Newman Norman (1905–1909)
- Graham Norris (1925–1926)
- Reginald Northway (1936)
- Harold Nunley (1931)
- Albert Nutter (1948–1953)

== O ==
- Francis O'Brien (1938–1939)
- Niall O'Brien (2007–2012)
- Norman Oldfield (1948–1954)
- Martin Olley (1983)
- Wayne Osman (1970–1971)
- Jamie Overton (2019)

== P ==
- Monty Panesar (2001–2016)
- Wayne Parnell (2021)
- Cyril Partridge (1921)
- Reg Partridge (1929–1948)
- Krish Patel (2024)
- Liam Patterson-White (2024)
- Arnold Payne (1931–1934)
- David Paynter (2002–2003)
- James Pearson (1932)
- Richard Pearson (1992)
- Ian Peck (1980–1981)
- Tony Penberthy (1989–2003)
- George Pennington (1927)
- Cyril Perkins (1934–1937)
- Stephen Peters (2006–2015)
- Stanley Philips (1938–1939)
- Ben Phillips (2002–2006)
- Peter Pickering (1953)
- Charl Pietersen (2005–2006)
- William Pinner (1908)
- David Pithey (1962)
- Thomas Pitt (1932–1935)
- Bob Platt (1964)
- Charles Pool (1905–1910)
- Lloyd Pope (2025)
- Mark Powell (2000–2004)
- Lionel Powys-Maurice (1922–1923)
- Seekkuge Prasanna (2016–2018)
- Dwaine Pretorius (2019)
- Harold Pretty (1906–1907)
- Roger Prideaux (1962–1970)
- Neil Priestley (1981)
- Luke Procter (2017–2025)

== R ==
- Nirvan Ramesh (2025)
- Donald Ramsamooj (1958–1964)
- Reginald Raven (1905–1921)
- Keith Reid (1973)
- Brian Reynolds (1950–1970)
- Ian Richards (1976–1979)
- Miles Richardson (2017)
- Ryan Rickelton (2022)
- David Ripley (1984–2001)
- Roderic Ripley (1922)
- Andrew Roberts (1989–1996)
- David Roberts (1996–1999)
- Timothy Roberts (2003–2005)
- Bert Robinson (1937–1946)
- Mark Robinson (1987–1990)
- Robert Robinson (1946)
- Tim Robinson (2025)
- Paul Rofe (2004)
- Chris Rogers (2006–2007)
- Adrian Rollins (2000–2002)
- Paul Romaines (1975–1976)
- Franklyn Rose (1998)
- Adam Rossington (2014–2021)
- Victor Rothschild, 3rd Baron Rothschild (1929–1931)
- Alex Russell (2022–2024)
- James Ryan (1911–1914)
- Kenneth Rymill (1926–1932)

== S ==
- David Sales (1994–2014)
- James Sales (2021–2025)
- Ben Sanderson (2015–2025)
- Sarfraz Nawaz (1969–1982)
- Arthur Sargent (1932)
- Malcolm Scott (1959–1969)
- George Scrimshaw (2024–2025)
- John Seymour (1908–1919)
- Bilal Shafayat (2005–2011)
- Shahid Afridi (2015)
- Tabraiz Shamsi (2017)
- Adam Shantry (2003–2004)
- Aadi Sharma (2025)
- George Sharp (1968–1985)
- Prithvi Shaw (2023–2024)
- Atif Sheikh (2017)
- Peter Shenton (1958)
- Sikandar Raza (2024)
- Archibald Sim (1964–1966)
- Cyril Simpson (1908)
- Harold Simpson (1905–1911)
- Fateh Singh (2024)
- Alan Skinner (1949)
- Charlie Smith (1905–1906)
- Gareth Smith (1986–1989)
- Lewis Smith (1947)
- Ronald Smith (1954)
- Sydney F Smith (1914)
- Sydney G Smith (1907–1914)
- † Thomas Smith (1931) (Note: Born at Northampton in 1905, Smith made a single first-class appearance for Northants, scoring 11 runs in his only innings and not taking a wicket in a May 1931 County Championship fixture against Nottinghamshire. He also played for the county's Club and Ground team during the same season. Smith died at Northampton in 1993, aged 88.)
- Jeremy Snape (1992–1998)
- Harold Snell (1909–1913)
- Alexander Snowden (1931–1939)
- Tom Sole (2017–2020)
- Matthew Spriegel (2013–2014)
- Neil Stanley (1988–1993)
- Sydney Starkie (1951–1956)
- David Steele (1963–1984)
- Norman Stevens (1937)
- Graham Stevenson (1987)
- Jim Stewart (1971–1972)
- Paul Stirling (2020)
- Frederick Stocks (1906)
- Olly Stone (2011–2016)
- Alastair Storie (1985–1986)
- Sidney Stretton (1928)
- Michael Strong (2000–2001)
- Raman Subba Row (1955–1961)
- Haydn Sully (1964–1969)
- Iain Sutcliffe (2007)
- Robin Sutcliffe (1999)
- Alec Swann (1996–2001)
- Graeme Swann (1997–2004)
- Sam Sweeney (2011–2012)
- John Swinburne (1970–1974)

== T ==
- Alan Tait (1971–1975)
- Paul Taylor (1991–2001)
- Tom Taylor (2020–2023)
- Gilbert Tebbitt (1934–1938)
- Sean Terry (2016)
- Albert Thomas (1919–1933)
- Greg Thomas (1989–1991)
- Alexander Thompson (1905–1908)
- George Thompson (1905–1922)
- Charles Thorneycroft (1907)
- Frank Thornton (1937)
- Charles Thorp (1908–1909)
- Tommy Thorpe (1913)
- Charlie Thurston (2018–2021)
- John Timms (1925–1949)
- Wilfrid Timms (1921–1932)
- Robert Tindall (1979–1981)
- Charles Tomblin (1914)
- Eric Tomkins (1920–1921)
- James Toon (1946)
- Edgar Towell (1923–1934)
- Chris Tremain (2023–2024)
- George Tribe (1951–1959)
- Vishal Tripathi (2010)
- Mark Turner (2014)
- Andrew Tye (2023)
- Bernard Tyler (1923–1924)
- Charles Tyler (1910–1923)
- Frank Tyson (1952–1960)

== V ==
- Chaminda Vaas (2010–2012)
- Stuart van der Merwe (2025)
- Johan van der Wath (2007–2009)
- Martin van Jaarsveld (2004)
- Denis Vann (1936–1937)
- Aryaman Varma (2025)
- Ricardo Vasconcelos (2018–2025)
- Richard Venes (1922)
- George Vials (1905–1922)
- Lou Vincent (2010)
- Roy Virgin (1973–1977)

== W ==
- Gareth Wade (2017–2018)
- Neil Wagner (2014)
- Alex Wakely (2007–2021)
- Fanny Walden (1910–1929)
- Alan Walker (1983–1993)
- Harold Walker (1947)
- William Walker (1908–1926)
- Tim Walton (1992–1998)
- Russell Warren (1992–2002)
- Mike Warrington (1951)
- Stuart Waterton (1986–1987)
- Ian Watson (1971)
- Fred Watts (1932–1937)
- Jim Watts (1958–1980)
- Peter Watts (1958–1966)
- Raphael Weatherall (2024–2025)
- Jack Webster (1946–1955)
- Lesroy Weekes (2001)
- Thomas Welch (1922–1931)
- Arthur Wells (1954–1955)
- William Wells (1905–1926)
- Riki Wessels (2005–2009)
- Matthew Wheeler (1985)
- Albert White (1914–1923)
- Andrew White (2004–2006)
- Cameron White (2012–2013)
- Edmund White (1946–1948)
- Graeme White (2006–2023)
- Harry White (1923)
- Jack White (2020–2024)
- Michael White (1947–1949)
- Oliver White (1920)
- Rob White (2000–2012)
- Philip Whitehead (1908–1909)
- Benjamin Whitehouse (2025)
- Sam Whiteman (2023)
- Edward Whitfield (1946)
- David Wigley (2006–2010)
- Duncan Wild (1980–1990)
- John Wild (1953–1961)
- Richard Wild (1996)
- Burton Wilkinson (1932)
- David Willey (2009–2025)
- Peter Willey (1966–1983)
- Harry Williams (1923–1924)
- Lizaad Williams (2022)
- Richard Williams (1974–1992)
- Gordon Williamson (1959–1962)
- John Willis (1919)
- Arnold Wills (1926–1929)
- Roy Wills (1963–1973)
- Harry Wilson (1931)
- John Wolstenholme (2005)
- Luke Wood (2019)
- Claud Woolley (1911–1931)
- Reginald Wooster (1925)
- Arthur Worsley (1905)
- Charles Worsley (1921)
- Alan Wright (1922–1923)
- Albert Wright (1919–1920)
- Bertie Wright (1919–1922)
- Damien Wright (2003–2005)
- Ernest Wright (1919)
- Nicholas Wright (1921–1922)
- Philip Wright (1921–1929)
- Richard Wright (1923–1926)
- Ronald Wright (1923–1931)
- Stephen Wright (1922–1923)

== Y ==
- Jim Yardley (1976–1982)
- Walter Yarnold (1928)
- Will Young (2022)

== Z ==
- Saif Zaib (2014–2025)

== See also ==
- List of Northamptonshire cricket captains
