= List of Northamptonshire cricket captains =

== Captains of Northamptonshire County Cricket Club ==
Northamptonshire County Cricket Club (Northants), based on an existing organisation that dated from 1820, was officially founded on 31 July 1878 in Kettering.

Northants joined the County Championship in 1905, when the team was elevated to first-class status, and is one of eighteen county teams in England that play first-class cricket.

The player appointed club captain leads the team in all fixtures except if unavailable.

- J. P. Kingston (1878–1887; 1890–1891)
- C. R. Thursby (1888)
- T. H. G. Welch (1889)
- F. Tyler (1892)
- E. Scriven (1893)
- A. G. Henfrey (1894–1895)
- T. Horton (1896–1906)
- E. M. Crosse (1907)
- T. E. Manning (1908–1910)
- G. A. T. Vials (1911–1913)
- S. G. Smith (1913–1914)
- J. N. Beasley (1919)
- R. O. Raven (1920–1921)
- C. H. Tyler (1922)
- A. H. Bull (1923–1924)
- J. M. Fitzroy (1925–1927)
- V. W. C. Jupp (1927–1931)
- W. C. Brown (1932–1935)
- G. B. Cuthbertson (1936–1937)
- R. P. Nelson (1938–1939)
- P. E. Murray-Willis (1946)
- J. Webster (1946)
- A. W. Childs-Clarke (1947–1948)
- F. R. Brown (1949–1953)
- D. Brookes (1954–1957)
- R. Subba Row (1958–1961)
- K. V. Andrew (1962–1966)
- R. M. Prideaux (1967–1970)
- P. J. Watts (1971–1974; 1978–1980)
- R. T. Virgin (1975)
- Mushtaq Mohammad (1976–1977)
- G. Cook (1981–1988)
- A. J. Lamb (1989–1995)
- R. J. Bailey (1996–1997)
- K. M. Curran (1998)
- M. L. Hayden (1999–2000)
- D. Ripley (2001)
- M. E. K. Hussey (2002–2003)
- D. J. G. Sales (2004–2007)
- N. Boje (2008–2010)
- A. J. Hall (2010–2012)
- S. D. Peters (2013–2014)
- A. J. Wakely (2015–2019)
- A. M. Rossington (2019–2021)
- R. S. Vasconcelos (2022)
- W. A. Young (2022)
- L. A. Procter (2023 to date)

== See also ==
- List of Northamptonshire CCC players

== Sources ==
- Northamptonshire County Cricket Club Yearbook, 2009
- Andrew Radd, 100 Greats – Northamptonshire County Cricket Club, Tempus, 2001
