= Hawtin =

Hawtin is a surname and may refer to:

- Craig Hawtin (born 1970), English footballer
- David Hawtin (born 1943), the fourth Bishop of Repton from 1999 to 2006
- Ian Hawtin (born 1966), English cricketer
- Jane Hawtin, Canadian television and radio personality
- Melanie Hawtin (born 1988), Canadian 1.5 point wheelchair basketball player
- Rawlins Hawtin, English cricketer active from 1902 to 1930
- Richie Hawtin (born 1970), English-Canadian electronic musician and DJ
- Roger Hawtin, English cricketer active from 1901 to 1908
- William Hawtin, English cricketer active from 1929 to 1948
