= Ernest Wright (English cricketer) =

English cricketer

Personal information
- Full name: Ernest Vincent Wright
- Born: 24 October 1894; Kettering, Northamptonshire, England
- Died: 16 December 1977 (aged 83); Kettering, Northamptonshire, England
- Batting: Right-handed
- Relatives: Albert Wright (brother); Richard Wright (brother); Stephen Wright (brother)

Domestic team information
- Years: Team
- 1919: Northamptonshire

Career statistics
Competition	First-class
Matches	2
Runs scored	2
Batting average	1.00
100s/50s	–/–
Top score	2
Balls bowled	–
Wickets	–
Bowling average	–
5 wickets in innings	–
10 wickets in match	–
Best bowling	–
Catches/stumpings	–/–
- Source: Cricinfo, 15 November 2011

Ernest Vincent Wright MC (24 October 1894 – 16 December 1977) was an English cricketer. Wright was a right-handed batsman. He was born at Kettering, Northamptonshire.

Wright served during World War I, by 1917 he was a temporary lieutenant, and in September of that year he was promoted to acting captain. By February 1918 he still held the simultaneous ranks of temporary lieutenant and acting captain in the Tank Corps. He was awarded the Military Cross, the citation for which appeared in The London Gazette in July 1918, and reads as follows:

For conspicuous gallantry and devotion to duty. He commanded his Tanks with great skill and judgement in an attack, and when his Tank ran out of petrol he went forward on foot with the infantry and assisted in the capture of the final objective under heavy fire. His Tanks were instrumental in advancing the line 7,000 yards.

In February 1919, three months after the war was over, he relinquished his rank of temporary captain.

Following the war, Wright made two first-class cricket appearances for Northamptonshire in 1919 against Warwickshire and Sussex, both at the County Ground, Northampton. He scored a total of two runs in these matches. He died at the town of his birth of 16 December 1977. His brothers Albert, Richard and Stephen all played first-class cricket for Northamptonshire.
