= Mark Cox =

Mark Cox may refer to:

- Mark Cox (tennis) (born 1943), British tennis player
- Mark Cox (poet) (born 1956), American poet
- Mark Cox (rugby league) (born 1978), English rugby league player
- Mark Cox (actor) (born 1972), Scottish comedian and actor
- Mark Cox, Jr. (1905–1979), English cricketer
- Mark Cox (cricketer) (1879–1968), English cricketer

== See also ==
- Mark Cocks, musician now known as Mark Hamilton
- John Mark Cox Jr., first African American to attend Rollins College
