= Harold Snell =

Harold Snell may refer to:

- Harold Snell (cricketer) (1876–1942)
- Harold Snell (rugby union) (born 1905)
- Harold Snell (Darwin businessman) (1892–1949)
- Harold Saxon-Snell (1889–1956), British stage and film actor
- Ted Snell (born Harold Edward Snell), Canadian hockey player
