= Cawdron =

Cawdron is a surname. Notable people with the surname include:

- Mike Cawdron (born 1974), English cricketer
- Robert Cawdron (1921–1997), French-born British actor
