= George Pennington =

George Pennington may refer to:

- Kewpie Pennington (1896–1953), Major League Baseball pitcher
- George Pennington (cricketer) (1899–1933), English cricketer
