= John Boswell (disambiguation) =

John Boswell (1947–1994) was an American historian, professor and writer.

John Boswell may also refer to:

- John Boswell (freemason) (c.1532–1609), Scottish gentleman
- John Boswell (clergyman), (1698–1757) Anglican priest and writer
- John Boswell (physician) (1710–1780), Scottish physician
- John Boswell (publishing-business figure) (born 1945), American literary agent and author
- John Boswell (rugby union) (1867–1948), Scottish rugby union player

== See also ==
- John Boswall (1920–2011), British actor
- John Buswell (1909–1992), English cricketer
