= Thiepval Memorial =

Memorial in Somme, France

Thiepval Memorial to the Missing of the Somme
- Commonwealth War Graves Commission
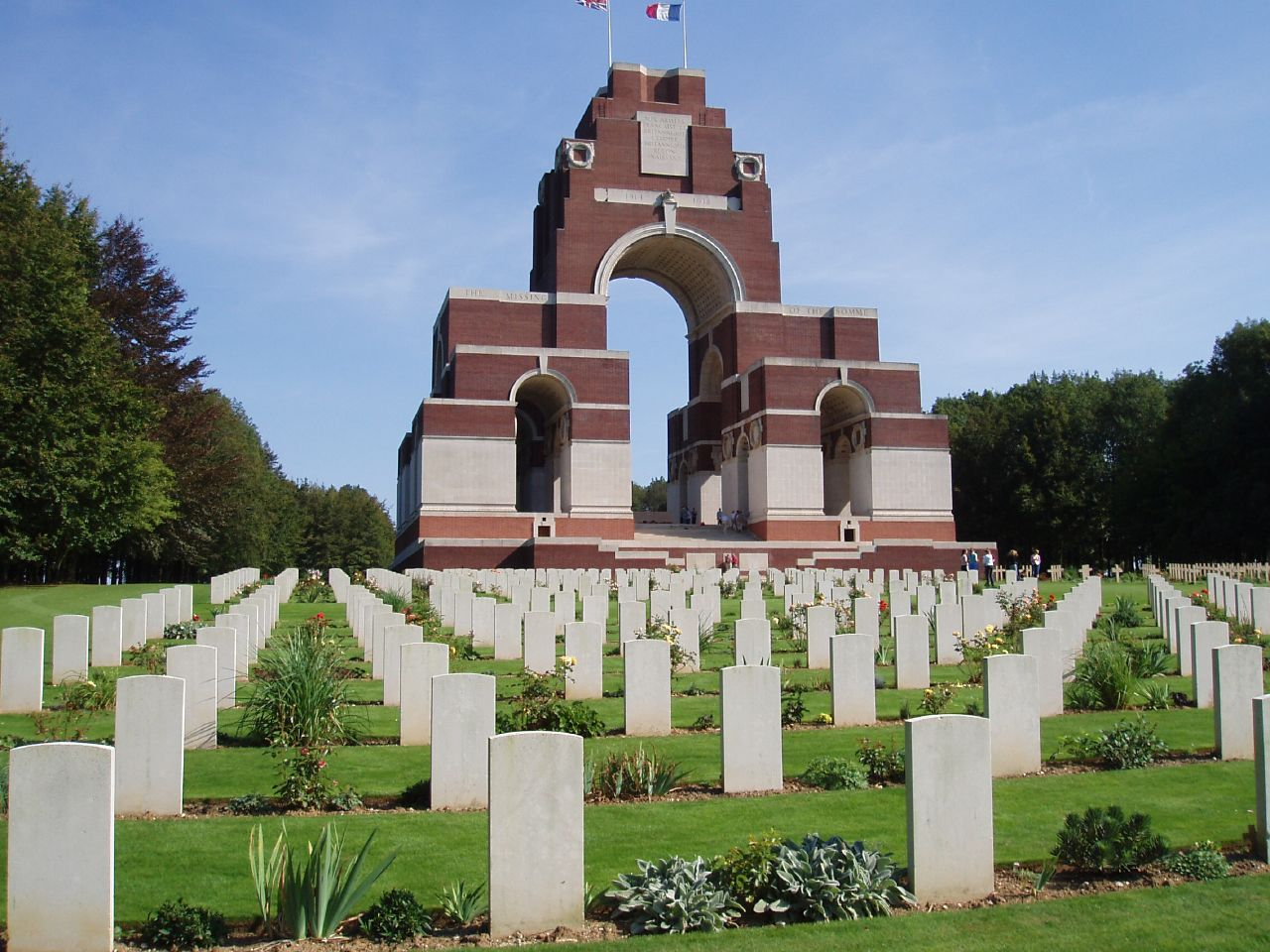
- The Thiepval Memorial to the Missing of the Somme
- For the dead of the Battles of the Somme of the First World War with no known grave
- Unveiled: 1 August 1932 by Edward, Prince of Wales
- Location: 50°3′2″N 2°41′9″E near Thiepval, northern France
- Designed by: Sir Edwin Lutyens
- Commemorated: 73,337
- Here are recorded names of officers and men of the British Armies who fell on the Somme battlefields July 1915 February 1918 but to whom the fortune of war denied the known and honoured burial given to their comrades in death.

UNESCO World Heritage Site
- Official name: Funerary and memory sites of the First World War (Western Front)
- Type: Cultural
- Criteria: i, ii, vi
- Designated: 2023 (45th session)
- Reference no.: 1567-SE03

The Thiepval Memorial to the Missing of the Somme is a war memorial to 72,337 missing British and South African servicemen who died in the Battles of the Somme of the First World War between 1915 and 1918, with no known grave. It is near the village of Thiepval, Picardy in France. A visitors' centre opened in 2004. Designed by Sir Edwin Lutyens, Thiepval has been described as "the greatest executed British work of monumental architecture of the twentieth century".

== Location ==
The Memorial was built approximately 200 m (660 ft) to the south-east of the former Thiepval Château, which was located on lower ground, by the side of Thiepval Wood. The grounds of the original château were not chosen as this would have required the moving of graves, dug during the war around the numerous medical aid stations.

== Design and inauguration ==
Designed by Sir Edwin Lutyens, the memorial was built between 1928 and 1932 and is the largest Commonwealth Memorial to the Missing in the world. It was inaugurated by the Prince of Wales (later King Edward VIII) in the presence of Albert Lebrun, the President of France, on 1 August 1932. The unveiling ceremony was attended by Lutyens. It was the last of the special memorials in Flanders and Picardy to be unveiled.

The memorial dominates the rural scene and has 16 brick piers, faced with Portland stone. It was originally built using French bricks from Lille but was refaced in 1973 with Accrington brick. The main arch is aligned east to west. The memorial is 140 ft (43 m) high above the level of its podium, which to the west is 20 ft (6.1 m) above the level of the adjoining cemetery. It has foundations 19 ft (5.8 m) thick, which were required because of extensive wartime tunnelling beneath the structure.

It is a complex form of memorial arch, comprising interlocking arches of four sizes. Each side of the main arch is pierced by a smaller arch, orientated at a right angle to the main arch. Each side of each of these smaller arches is then pierced by a still smaller arch and so on. The keystone of each smaller arch is at the level of the spring of the larger arch that it pierces; each of these levels is marked by a stone cornice. This design results in 16 piers, having 64 stone-panelled sides. Only 48 of these are inscribed, as the panels around the outside of the memorial are blank.

According to the architectural historian Stephen Games, the memorial is composed of two intersecting triumphal arches, each with a larger central arch and two smaller subsidiary arches, the arches on the east–west facades being taller than those on the north–south, all raised up from what is loosely a square four-by-four tartan grid plan. The main arch is surmounted by a tower. In the central space of the memorial a Stone of Remembrance rests on a three-stepped platform.

The memorial is graven with the names 72,246 officers and men (see below) and Lutyens's ingenious geometry arises out of the attempt to display these names in compact form, rather than in the longer, lower and linear form taken by other memorials to the missing of the war, such as those at Loos, Pozières and Arras.

== Inscriptions ==
The inscription of names on the memorial is reserved for those missing or unidentified soldiers who have no known grave. A large inscription on an internal surface of the memorial reads:

Here are recorded
names of officers
and men of the
British Armies who fell
on the Somme battlefields
July 1915 February 1918
but to whom
the fortune of war
denied the known
and honoured burial
given to their
comrades in death.

On the Portland stone piers are engraved the names of over 72,000 men who were lost in the Somme battles between July 1915 and March 1918. The Commonwealth War Graves Commission states that over 90 per cent of these soldiers died in the first Battle of the Somme between 1 July and 18 November 1916. The names are carved using the standard upper-case lettering designed for the commission by MacDonald Gill.

Over the years since its inauguration, bodies have been discovered on the former battlefield and are sometimes identified by various means. The decision was taken that to protect the integrity of the memorial as one solely for those who are missing or unidentified, that if a body were found and identified the inscription of their name would be removed from the memorial by filling in the inscription with cement. For those who are found and identified, they are given a funeral with full military honours at a cemetery close to the location at which they were discovered. This practice has resulted in numerous gaps in the lists of names.

On the top of the archway, a French inscription reads "Aux armées Française et Britannique l'Empire Britannique reconnaissant" ("To the French and British Armies, from the grateful British Empire"). Just below this, are carved the years 1914 and 1918. On the upper edges of the side archways, split across left and right, is carved the phrase "The Missing / of the Somme".

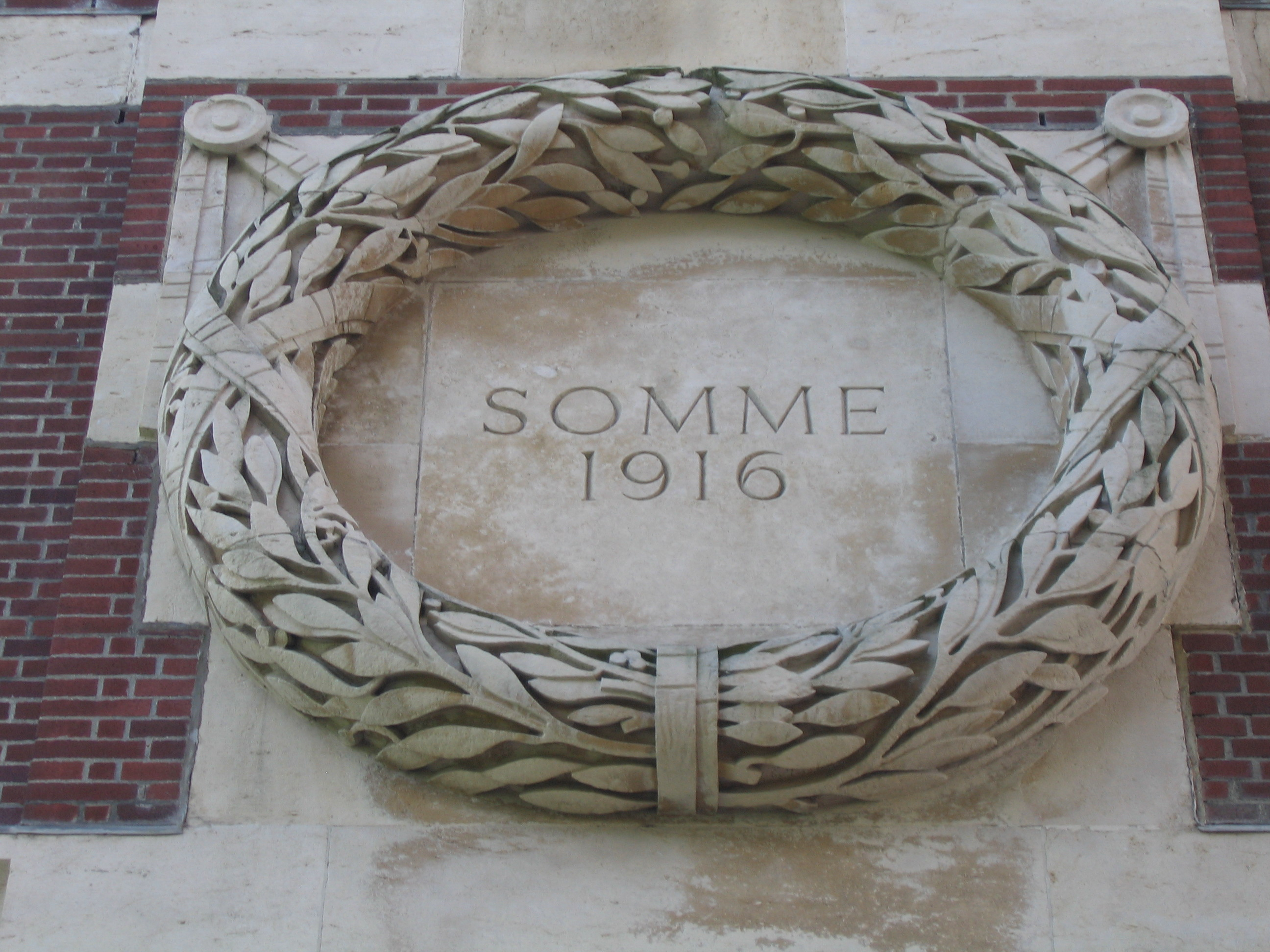
The 'Somme 1916' roundel

Included on this memorial are sixteen stone laurel wreaths, inscribed with the names of sub-battles that made up the Battle of the Somme and subsequent actions, in which the men commemorated at Thiepval fell. One is simply titled 'Somme 1916'. Thirteen battles so-named on the other roundels are Ancre Heights, Ancre, Albert, High Wood, Delville Wood, Morval, Flers–Courcelette, Pozières Wood, Bazentin Ridge, Thiepval Ridge, Transloy Ridges, Ginchy, and Guillemont. The final two roundels are for 'Bapaume' and 'Miraumont', most likely referring to battles or actions on the Somme front in 1917 as the Thiepval Memorial includes the missing dead that fell before 20 March 1918. The Actions of Miraumont took place from 17 to 18 February 1917 and Bapaume was occupied by the British on 17 March 1917 (see Operations on the Ancre, January–March 1917).

== Notable people commemorated on the memorial ==
Seven Victoria Cross recipients are listed on the memorial, under their respective regiments. All British unless otherwise noted:

- Eric Norman Frankland Bell
- William Buckingham
- Geoffrey St. George Shillington Cather
- William McFadzean
- William Mariner
- Thomas Orde Lawder Wilkinson
- Alexander Young (South African)

Also commemorated are:

- English first-class cricketer Alban Arnold
- English first-class cricketer Sydney Thomas Askham
- Composer George Butterworth
- Irish first-class cricketer William Crozier
- Scots rugby international Rowland Fraser
- English first-class cricketer John Gregory
- England rugby international and clergyman Rupert Inglis
- Irish economist, poet and former British member of parliament Thomas Michael Kettle
- England rugby international John Abbott King
- Irish international footballer Jimmy Maxwell
- England rugby international Alfred Maynard
- English Real Sociedad footballer George McGuinness
- Scots rugby international Eric Milroy
- Welsh international footballer Leigh Richmond Roose
- English writer Saki (Hector Hugh Munro)
- English first-class cricketer Ernest Shorrocks
- Welsh rugby international Dick Thomas
- Welsh rugby international Horace Thomas
- Musician and composer Francis Purcell Warren
- Welsh rugby international David Watts
- English River Plate footballer Arthur Herbert Thompson

== Anglo-French memorial ==
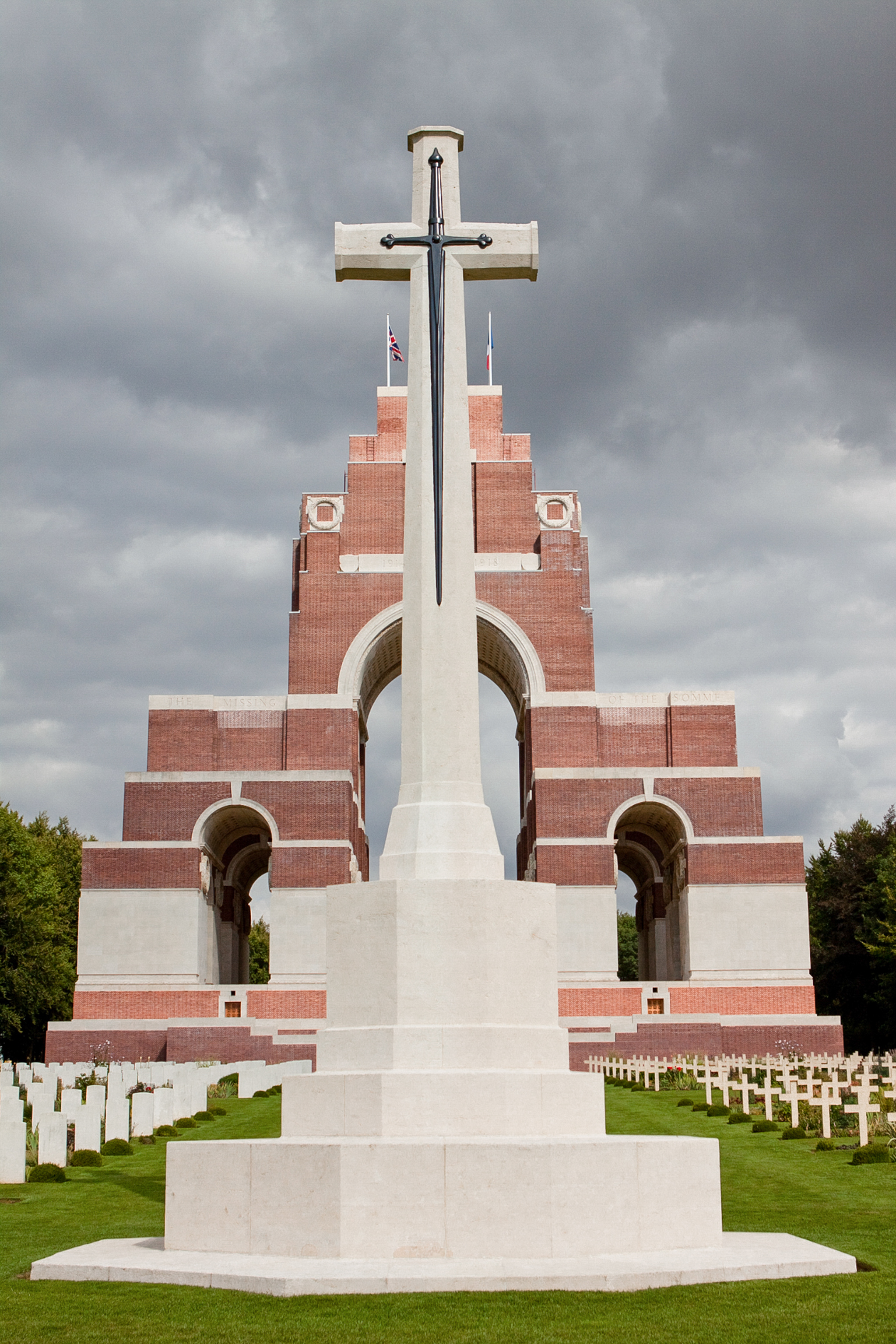
Cross of Sacrifice and British (left) and French (right) graves by the memorial

The Thiepval Memorial also serves as an Anglo-French battle memorial to commemorate the joint nature of the 1916 offensive. In further recognition of this, a cemetery, Thiepval Anglo-French Cemetery, containing 300 British Commonwealth and 300 French graves lies at the foot of the memorial. Most of the soldiers buried here – 239 of the British Commonwealth and 253 of the French – are unknown, the bodies having been reburied here after discovery between December 1931 and March 1932, mostly from the Somme battlefields but some from as far north as Loos and as far south as Le Quesnel. The British Commonwealth graves have rectangular headstones made of white stone, while the French graves have grey stone crosses. For those unidentified, the British headstones bear the inscription "A Soldier of the Great War / Known unto God", the French crosses bear the single word "Inconnu" ('unknown'). The cemetery's Cross of Sacrifice bears an inscription that acknowledges the joint British and French contributions

That the world may remember the common sacrifice of two and a half million dead, here have been laid side by side Soldiers of France and of the British Empire in eternal comradeship.

— Thiepval Anglo-French Cemetery Cross of Sacrifice inscription

== Ceremonies and services ==
Each year on 1 July (the anniversary of the first day on the Somme) a major ceremony is held at the memorial. There is also a ceremony on 11 November, beginning at 10.45 CET.

== See also ==
- World War I memorials
