= Alfred Dickens =

Alfred Dickens may refer to:

- Alfred Lamert Dickens (1822–1860), younger brother of novelist Charles Dickens
- Alfred D'Orsay Tennyson Dickens (1845–1912), son of Charles Dickens
- Alfred Dickens (cricketer) (1883–1938), English cricketer
