= Ronald Knight (disambiguation) =

Ronald Knight may also refer to:

- Ronald Knight (1913–1991), English cricketer
- Ronnie Knight (1934–2023), birth name Ronald Knight, English convicted criminal and nightclub owner.
- Ronald Alan Knight (born 1968), American convicted murderer
