= Sam Sweeney (disambiguation) =

Sam Sweeney is a musician.

Sam Sweeney may also refer to:

- Sam Sweeney (cricketer)
- Sam Sweeney, character in New Girl (TV series)
