= Nicholas Wright =

Nicholas or Nick Wright may refer to:

== Sports ==
- Nicholas Wright (cricketer, born 1960), English cricketer
- Nicholas Wright (cricketer, born 1901) (1901–1974), English cricketer
- Nick Wright (footballer, born 1975), English footballer
- Nick Wright (footballer, born 1987), English footballer
- Nick Wright (sportscaster) (born 1984), sports radio and television personality

== Other people ==
- Nicholas Wright (academic) (born 1945), English academic
- Nicholas Wright (playwright) (born 1940), British dramatist
- Nicolas Wright (born 1982), Canadian actor
- Nick Wright (politician) (born 1982), Canadian politician and lawyer
- Nick Wright (Royal Navy officer) (born 1949), private secretary to the Princess Royal
- N. T. Wright (born 1948), British New Testament scholar and Anglican bishop

== See also ==
- Phoenix Wright, nicknamed "Nick", fictional character in the game Phoenix Wright: Ace Attorney
