= Charles Pool =

Charles Pool may refer to:

- Charles Pool (cricketer) (1876–1954), English cricketer
- Charles W. Pool (1856–1930), American newspaper editor and politician

== See also ==
- Charles Poole (disambiguation)
