= Patrick Sherrard =

English cricketer

Personal information
- Full name: Patrick Sherrard
- Born: 7 January 1919; Mickleover, Derbyshire, England
- Died: 11 January 1997 (aged 78); Exeter, Devon, England
- Batting: Right-handed

Domestic team information
- Years: Team
- 1946: Berkshire
- 1938: Leicestershire
- 1938: Cambridge University

Career statistics
Competition	First-class
Matches	2
Runs scored	60
Batting average	20.00
100s/50s	–/1
Top score	53
Balls bowled	–
Wickets	–
Bowling average	–
5 wickets in innings	–
10 wickets in match	–
Best bowling	–
Catches/stumpings	–/–
- Source: Cricinfo, 8 December 2011

Patrick Sherrard (7 January 1919 – 11 January 1997) was an English cricketer. Sherrard was a right-handed batsman. He was born at Mickleover, Derbyshire and educated at Stowe School.

Sherrard made a single first-class appearance for Cambridge University against Northamptonshire at Fenner's in 1938. In this match, he scored 5 runs in the university's first-innings, before being dismissed by Eric Herbert, while in their second-innings he was dismissed by Reginald Partridge for 2 runs. The match ended in a draw. In that same season he also made a single first-class appearance for Leicestershire against Oxford University at the University Parks. In Leicestershire's first-innings, he scored 53 runs before being dismissed by Peter Whitehouse. This was his only innings of the match, which ended in a draw.

Following World War II, Sherrard made a single appearance for Berkshire against Hertfordshire in the 1946 Minor Counties Championship. He died at Exeter, Devon on 11 January 1997.
