= Charles Buller (disambiguation) =

Charles Buller (1806–1848) was a British barrister, politician and reformer.

Charles Buller may also refer to:

- Charles Buller (cricketer, born 1892) (1892–1969), English cricketer
- Charles Buller (cricketer, born 1846) (1846–1906), English cricketer

== See also ==
- Charles Buller Heberden (1849–1921), English classical scholar
