= Eric Dixon =

Eric Dixon may refer to:

- Eric Dixon (musician) (1930–1989), American jazz tenor saxophonist
- Eric Dixon (basketball) (born 2001), American basketball player
- Eric Dixon (cricketer) (1915–1941), English cricketer
