= Charles Worsley (cricketer) =

English cricketer

Personal information
- Full name: Charles Edward Austen Worsley
- Born: 30 May 1902; Evenley, Northamptonshire, England
- Died: 2 December 1990 (aged 88); Cove, Devon, England
- Batting: Right-handed
- Relatives: Arthur Worsley (brother); Edward Knight (grandfather)

Domestic team information
- Years: Team
- 1921: Northamptonshire

Career statistics
Competition	First-class
Matches	2
Runs scored	34
Batting average	8.50
100s/50s	–/–
Top score	23
Balls bowled	–
Wickets	–
Bowling average	–
5 wickets in innings	–
10 wickets in match	–
Best bowling	–
Catches/stumpings	1/–
- Source: Cricinfo, 19 November 2011

Charles Edward Austen Worsley (30 May 1902 – 2 December 1990) was an English cricketer. Worsley was a right-handed batsman.

He was born at Evenley Vicarage, Northamptonshire and baptised on 29 June 1902, the son of the Rev. Edward Worsley (died 16 April 1923), Vicar of Evenley, 1872–1923, and Honorary Canon of Peterborough, by Ethel Adela (died 28 June 1913), the youngest daughter of Edward Knight of Chawton House, Chawton, Hampshire. He was educated at Radley College, from 1915 to 1921.

He worked for Sir Edward Penton and Company, boot manufacturers, 1921–24, as a tea planter in Ceylon, 1924, silver fox farmer in Devon, 1934, and as a tea planter in Ceylon again, 1939–52.

Worsley made two first-class appearances for Northamptonshire in the 1921 County Championship against Sussex and Warwickshire. In the match against Sussex at the County Ground, Northampton, Worsely scored 5 runs in Northamptonshire's first-innings, before being dismissed by Vallance Jupp. In their second-innings he was dismissed for 23 by the same bowler. The match ended in a draw. In the match against Warwickshire at Edgbaston, he was dismissed for 4 runs in Northamptonshire's first-innings by Willie Quaife, while in their second-innings he scored 2 runs, before being dismissed by Harry Howell. Warwickshire won the match by 82 runs.

He married 1939, Doris Mary, daughter of A. F. Whitechurch. He died at Cove, Devon on 2 December 1990. His brother, Arthur, also played first-class cricket. He was also related through his mother to the Knight cricketing family, a large number of whom played first-class cricket.
