= Edmund Crosse =

Edmund Crosse may refer to:

- Edmund Crosse, founded Crosse & Blackwell food production company with Thomas Blackwell
- Edmund Crosse (cricketer) (1882–1963), English cricketer
