= William Batson =

William Batson may refer to:

- Shazam (DC Comics), alter-ego of William "Billy" Batson
- William Batson (cricketer), English cricketer
