= Thomas Manning =

Thomas Manning may refer to:

- Thomas Manning (sinologist) (1772–1840), Chinese studies scholar and the first Englishman to enter Lhasa
- Thomas Manning (bishop), Tudor prior and bishop
- Thomas A. Manning (1886–1944), American politician
- Thomas Courtland Manning (1825–1887), American jurist
- Thomas Henry Manning (1911–1998), British-Canadian Arctic explorer, biologist, geographer, zoologist, and author
- Thomas Manning (priest), Archdeacon of Totnes, 1453
- Thomas Manning (cricketer) (1884–1975), English cricketer
- Tom Manning (comics), fictional character from the Dark Horse Comics universe
- Tom Manning (murderer) (1946–2019), American militant radical and bank robber
- Tom Manning (American football) (born 1983), American football coach
