= Ashenden =

Ashenden or Ashendon may refer to:

People:

- Ben Ashenden (born 1989/1990), British actor and comedian
- Gavin Ashenden (born 1954), English academic, author, journalist
- Martin Ashenden (born 1937), English former cricketer
- Scott Ashenden (born 1939), Australian politician

Places:

- Ashendon, Western Australia, Australia, a suburb of Perth
- Ashendon Hundred, a former hundred in the county of Buckinghamshire, England
- Ashendon, a village and civil parish in Buckinghamshire
- Ashendon Junction, a former major railway junction in Buckinghamshire

Entertainment:

- the title character of Ashenden: Or the British Agent, a 1927 collection of stories by W. Somerset Maugham
  - Ashenden (TV series), a 1991 BBC British spy drama series based on Maugham's stories
