= Thomas Pitt (disambiguation) =

Thomas Pitt (1653–1726) was an English merchant.

Thomas Pitt may also refer to:

- Thomas Pitt, 1st Earl of Londonderry (1668–1729), British politician
- Thomas Pitt of Boconnoc (c. 1705–1761)
- Thomas Pitt, 1st Baron Camelford (1737–1793), British politician and connoisseur of art
- Thomas Pitt, 2nd Baron Camelford (1771–1804), British peer, naval officer and wastrel
- Thomas Pitt (cricketer) (1892–1957), English cricketer for Northamptonshire
- Thomas Pitt (fictional character), the protagonist in a series of detective novels by Anne Perry
