= Kenneth Ball =

English cricketer

Personal information
- Full name: Kenneth John Ball
- Born: 16 May 1889; Northampton, Northamptonshire, England
- Died: 16 January 1958 (aged 68); Northampton, Northamptonshire, England
- Batting: Right-handed
- Bowling: Unknown

Domestic team information
- Years: Team
- 1921: Northamptonshire

Career statistics
Competition	First-class
Matches	12
Runs scored	178
Batting average	8.47
100s/50s	–/–
Top score	49
Balls bowled	734
Wickets	13
Bowling average	29.53
5 wickets in innings	–
10 wickets in match	–
Best bowling	4/52
Catches/stumpings	7/–
- Source: Cricinfo, 20 January 2013

Kenneth John Ball (16 May 1889 – 16 January 1958) was an English cricketer. Ball was a right-handed batsman whose bowling style is unknown. He was born at Northampton, Northamptonshire.

Ball made his first-class debut for Northamptonshire against Essex in the 1921 County Championship at the County Ground, Northampton. He made eleven further first-class appearances for the county in 1921, the last of which came against Warwickshire. In his twelve first-class matches for Northamptonshire, he scored a total of 178 runs at an average of 8.47, with a high score of 49. With the ball, he took 13 wickets at a bowling average of 29.53, with best figures of 4/52.

He died at the town of his birth on 16 January 1958.
