= Oliver White (cricketer) =

English cricketer

Personal information
- Full name: Oliver Claude White
- Born: 11 March 1880; Iver, Buckinghamshire, England
- Died: 12 January 1956 (aged 75); Earlswood, Surrey, England
- Batting: Right-handed
- Bowling: Right-arm slow

Domestic team information
- Years: Team
- 1920: Northamptonshire
- 1906: Buckinghamshire

Career statistics
Competition	First-class
Matches	5
Runs scored	57
Batting average	9.50
100s/50s	–/–
Top score	15*
Balls bowled	437
Wickets	10
Bowling average	27.90
5 wickets in innings	–
10 wickets in match	–
Best bowling	3/49
Catches/stumpings	1/–
- Source: Cricinfo, 27 June 2011

Oliver Claude White (11 March 1880 – 12 January 1956) was an English cricketer. White was a right-handed batsman who bowled right-arm slow. He was born in Iver, Buckinghamshire and educated at Merchant Taylors' School, where he played for the school cricket team.

White made his debut for Buckinghamshire in the 1906 Minor Counties Championship against Wiltshire. He made 2 further appearances for the county, both coming in 1906 against Bedfordshire and Hertfordshire. Following World War I, White made his first-class debut for Northamptonshire against Essex in the 1920 County Championship. He made 4 further first-class appearances for Northamptonshire, all coming in 1920, with his final appearance coming against Essex. In his 5 first-class matches, he scored 57 runs at an average of 9.50, with a high score of 15*. With the ball, he took 10 wickets at a bowling average of 27.90, with best figures of 3/49.

White died in Earlswood, Surrey on 12 January 1956.
