= George Hawes =

English cricketer

Personal information
- Full name: George Howard Hawes
- Born: 19 October 1881; Rothwell, Northamptonshire, England
- Died: 26 October 1934 (aged 53); Desborough, Northamptonshire, England
- Batting: Right-handed
- Bowling: Right-arm medium

Domestic team information
- Years: Team
- 1919: Northamptonshire

Career statistics
Competition	First-class
Matches	2
Runs scored	16
Batting average	8.00
100s/50s	–/–
Top score	12*
Balls bowled	162
Wickets	1
Bowling average	87.00
5 wickets in innings	–
10 wickets in match	–
Best bowling	1/43
Catches/stumpings	1/–
- Source: Cricinfo, 18 November 2011

George Howard Hawes (19 October 1881 – 26 October 1934) was an English cricketer. Hawes was a right-handed batsman who bowled right-arm medium. He was born at Rothwell, Northamptonshire.

Hawes made two first-class appearances for Northamptonshire against Lancashire and the Australian Imperial Forces in 1919, both at the County Ground, Northampton. In the match against Lancashire he took the wicket of Francis Musson, while in Northamptonshire's first-innings he was dismissed for a duck by James Tyldesley. Against the Australian Imperial Forces, he scored 12 not out in Northamptonshire's first-innings, while in their second-innings he was dismissed by Herbie Collins for 4 runs.

According to The London Gazette, Hawes owned a boot manufacturing business, The Albion Boot Co., as part of a partnership with John Carew Dillon, Alfred Charles Panter and Charles Reuben Panter, however this was dissolved in October 1917. He died at Desborough, Northamptonshire on 26 October 1934.
