= Wilfred Izzard =

English cricketer

Personal information
- Full name: Wilfred Cyril Izzard
- Born: 25 February 1892; Northampton, Northamptonshire, England
- Died: 15 September 1977 (aged 85); Northampton, Northamptonshire, England
- Batting: Right-handed

Domestic team information
- Years: Team
- 1919–1920: Northamptonshire

Career statistics
Competition	First-class
Matches	12
Runs scored	206
Batting average	10.30
100s/50s	–/1
Top score	51
Balls bowled	–
Wickets	–
Bowling average	–
5 wickets in innings	–
10 wickets in match	–
Best bowling	–
Catches/stumpings	8/–
- Source: Cricinfo, 16 November 2011

Wilfred Cyril Izzard (25 February 1892 – 15 September 1977) was an English cricketer. Izzard was a right-handed batsman. He was born at Northampton, Northamptonshire.

Izzard made his first-class debut for Northamptonshire against Lancashire in the 1919 County Championship. He made eleven further first-class appearances, the last of which came against Lancashire in the 1920 County Championship. In his twelve first-class matches, he scored 206 runs at an average of 10.30, with a high score of 51. This score was his only first-class fifty and came against Derbyshire in 1919.

He died at the town of his birth on 15 September 1977.
