= Robert Beasley =

English cricketer

Robert Noble Beasley was an English cricketer active from 1907 to 1911 who played for Northamptonshire. He was born in Dallington, Northampton on 17 December 1882 and died in Northampton on 21 January 1966. Beasley appeared in ten first-class matches as a righthanded batsman. He scored 109 runs with a highest score of 28.
