= Stuart Humfrey =

English cricketer

Stuart Harold Guise Humfrey (17 February 1894 – 9 June 1975) was an English cricketer who played first-class cricket for Northamptonshire from 1913 to 1926. He was born in Headington, Oxfordshire, and died in Dallington, Northamptonshire.

Humfrey attended Oakham School, where he played in the First XI for five years, from 1909 to 1913. He appeared in 21 first-class matches as a big-hitting right-handed batsman who bowled right-arm medium pace. He scored 477 runs with a highest score of 61 not out in 1925 – which took only 35 minutes and included five sixes – and took one wicket.

By profession he was an eye specialist in Northampton.
