= Cyril Partridge =

English cricketer

Personal information
- Full name: Cyril Partridge
- Born: 2 August 1896; Higham Ferrers, Northamptonshire, England
- Died: 23 February 1945 (aged 48); Shillington, Bedfordshire, England
- Batting: Right-handed

Domestic team information
- Years: Team
- 1921: Northamptonshire

Career statistics
Competition	First-class
Matches	1
Runs scored	1
Batting average	0.50
100s/50s	–/–
Top score	1
Balls bowled	–
Wickets	–
Bowling average	–
5 wickets in innings	–
10 wickets in match	–
Best bowling	–
Catches/stumpings	–/–
- Source: Cricinfo, 17 November 2011

Cyril Partridge (2 August 1896 – 23 February 1945) was an English cricketer. Partridge was a right-handed batsman. He was born at Higham Ferrers, Northamptonshire.

Partridge made a single first-class appearance for Northamptonshire against Lancashire at Old Trafford in the 1921 County Championship. In Northamptonshire's first-innings he was dismissed for a single run by Dick Tyldesley, while in their second-innings he was dismissed by Harry Dean for a duck.

He died at Shillington, Bedfordshire on 23 February 1945.
