= John Abbott King =

England international rugby union player (1883–1916)

- Born: 21 August 1883
- Died: 9 August 1916 (aged 32) Pas-de-Calais, France

Rugby union career
- Position: Number 8
Amateur team(s)
Years	Team	Apps	(Points)
1906-??	Headingley FC		
International career
Years	Team	Apps	(Points)
1911-1913	England	12	
19??	Barbarians	2	(0)
- Military career
- Allegiance: United Kingdom
- Branch: British Army
- Service years: 1914-1916
- Rank: Lance corporal
- Unit: King’s Liverpool Regiment
- Conflicts: World War I; Battle of the Somme †

John Abbott King (21 August 1883 – 9 August 1916) was an English rugby union player who won 12 caps as a number 8 between 1911 and 1913. During World War I he served as a lance corporal with the King's Liverpool Regiment, and was killed at the Battle of the Somme aged 32. He is one of the missing commemorated on the Thiepval Memorial.
