= Wilfred Ball =

English cricketer

Personal information
- Full name: Wilfred Joseph Ball
- Born: 24 April 1895; Thrapston, Northamptonshire, England
- Died: 23 July 1965 (aged 70); Hollowell, Northamptonshire, England
- Batting: Right-handed
- Role: Wicket-keeper

Domestic team information
- Years: Team
- 1924–1931: Northamptonshire

Career statistics
Competition	First-class
Matches	4
Runs scored	10
Batting average	2.50
100s/50s	–/–
Top score	8
Balls bowled	–
Wickets	–
Bowling average	–
5 wickets in innings	–
10 wickets in match	–
Best bowling	–
Catches/stumpings	2/–
- Source: Cricinfo, 17 November 2011

Wilfred Joseph Ball (24 April 1895 – 23 July 1965) was an English cricketer. Ball was a right-handed batsman who fielded as a wicket-keeper. He was born at Thrapston, Northamptonshire.

Ball made his first-class debut for Northamptonshire in the 1924 County Championship against Nottinghamshire. Seven years later he returned to county cricket, making three further first-class appearances for the county in the 1931 County Championship against Warwickshire, Derbyshire and Glamorgan. In his four first-class matches, he just 10 runs at an average of 2.50, with a high score of 8.

He died at Hollowell, Northamptonshire on 23 July 1965.
