= William Batson (cricketer) =

English cricketer

Personal information
- Full name: William Batson
- Batting: Right-handed

Domestic team information
- Years: Team
- 1920–1921: Northamptonshire

Career statistics
Competition	First-class
Matches	2
Runs scored	45
Batting average	11.25
100s/50s	–/–
Top score	34
Balls bowled	–
Wickets	–
Bowling average	–
5 wickets in innings	–
10 wickets in match	–
Best bowling	–
Catches/stumpings	–/–
- Source: Cricinfo, 17 November 2011

William Batson (dates of birth and death unknown) was an English cricketer. Batson was a right-handed batsman.

Batson made two first-class appearances for Northamptonshire against Surrey in the 1920 County Championship and Warwickshire in the 1921 County Championship. In the match against Surrey at The Oval, he scored 9 runs in Northamptonshire's first-innings, before being dismissed by Percy Fender, while in their second-innings he was dismissed for a duck by the same bowler. Against Warwickshire at the County Ground, he scored 2 runs before being dismissed by Gerard Rotherham, while in their second-innings he was dismissed by Harry Howell, having scored 34 runs.
