= Harold Nunley =

English cricketer (1912–2005)

Personal information
- Full name: Harold Nunley
- Born: 12 January 1912; Raunds, Northamptonshire, England
- Died: June 2005 (aged 92–93); Kettering, Northamptonshire, England
- Batting: Left-handed
- Bowling: Slow left-arm orthodox

Domestic team information
- Years: Team
- 1931: Northamptonshire

Career statistics
Competition	First-class
Matches	3
Runs scored	20
Batting average	6.66
100s/50s	–/–
Top score	12
Balls bowled	156
Wickets	–
Bowling average	–
5 wickets in innings	–
10 wickets in match	–
Best bowling	–
Catches/stumpings	–/–
- Source: Cricinfo, 17 November 2011

Harold Nunley (12 January 1912 – June 2005) was an English cricketer. Nunley was a left-handed batsman who bowled slow left-arm orthodox. He was born at Raunds, Northamptonshire.

Nunley made three first-class appearances for Northamptonshire in the 1931 County Championship against Glamorgan, Kent and Worcestershire. In these three matches, he scored a total of just 20 runs at an average of 6.66, with a high score of 12.

He died at Kettering, Northamptonshire in June 2005.
