= John Denton (cricketer) =

English cricketer

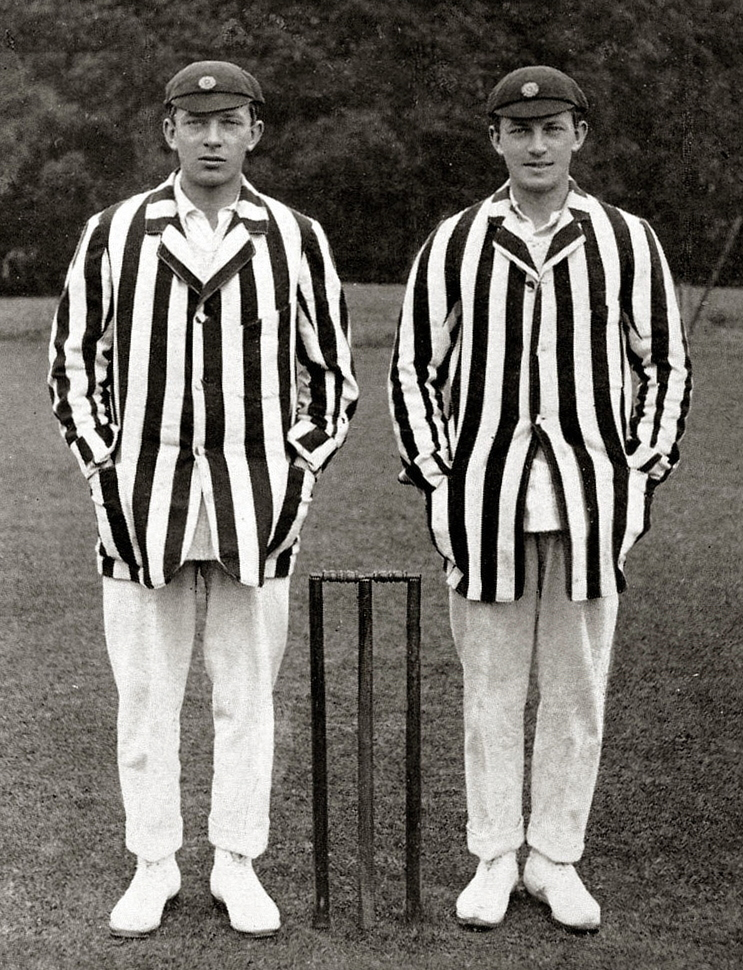
William and John Denton

John Sidney Denton (2 November 1890, in Rushden, Northamptonshire – 9 April 1971, in Rushden) was an English cricketer active from 1929 to 1948, who played for Northamptonshire (Northants) together with his twin brother William. Denton appeared in 104 first-class matches as a righthanded batsman who bowled leg break and googly. He scored 3,298 runs with a highest score of 124, one of two centuries, and took 67 wickets with a best performance of five for 39.
