= Philip Whitehead (cricketer) =

English cricketer

Philip James Whitehead (1881–1957) was an English cricketer who played two first-class matches for Northamptonshire in 1909, scoring 24 runs and taking one wicket for 11. Details of his batting and bowling styles are unknown. He was born in Deddington, Oxfordshire on 2 March 1881 and died in Greenwich on 26 June 1957.
