= Martin Bamber =

English cricketer

Personal information
- Full name: Martin John Bamber
- Born: 7 January 1961 (age 65); Cheam, Surrey, England
- Batting: Right-handed
- Bowling: Right-arm medium

Domestic team information
- Years: Team
- 1982–1984: Northamptonshire

Career statistics
Competition	First-class	List A
Matches	13	10
Runs scored	638	205
Batting average	26.58	29.28
100s/50s	–/3	–/1
Top score	77	71
Balls bowled	15	–
Wickets	–	–
Bowling average	–	–
5 wickets in innings	–	–
10 wickets in match	–	–
Best bowling	–	–
Catches/stumpings	6/–	2/–
- Source: Cricinfo, 23 September 2011

Martin John Bamber (born 7 January 1961) is a former English cricketer. Bamber was a right-handed batsman who bowled right-arm medium pace. He was born in Cheam, Surrey.

Having previously played Second XI cricket for Middlesex and Surrey between 1976 and 1981, Bamber eventually joined Northamptonshire, making his first-class debut for the county against Cambridge University in 1982. He made a further twelve first-class appearances for the county, the last of which came against Somerset in the 1984 County Championship. In his thirteen first-class matches, he scored a total of 638 runs at an average of 26.58, with a high score of 77. This score, which was one of three first-class fifties he made, came against Cambridge University in 1982. He made his List A debut in the 1983 John Player Special League against Surrey. He made nine further List A appearances, the last of which came in the 1984 John Player Special League against Somerset. In his ten List A matches, he scored 205 runs at an average of 29.28, with a high score of 71. This score, which was his only List A fifty, came against Surrey in 1983. He left Northamptonshire at the end of the 1984 season.
