= Craig Atkins =

Australian cricketer

Personal information
- Full name: Craig Stuart Atkins
- Born: 29 May 1966 (age 60); Melbourne, Victoria, Australia
- Batting: Left-handed
- Bowling: Slow left-arm orthodox
- Role: All-rounder

Domestic team information
- Years: Team
- 1995: Northamptonshire
- Only First-class: 18 May 1995 Northamptonshire v Surrey
- Only List A: 27 August 1995 Northamptonshire v Nottinghamshire

Career statistics
Competition	First-class	List A
Matches	1	1
Runs scored	13	–
Batting average	13.00	–
100s/50s	0/0	–/–
Top score	8*	–
Balls bowled	66	26
Wickets	1	0
Bowling average	46.00	–
5 wickets in innings	0	–
10 wickets in match	0	–
Best bowling	1/46	–
Catches/stumpings	0/0	0/0
- Source: CricketArchive (subscription required), 5 November 2011

Craig Atkins (born 29 May 1966) was an Australian cricketer. He was a left-handed batsman and left-arm slow bowler who played for Northamptonshire. He was born in Melbourne.

Atkins made his Second XI debut for the side during the 1990 season, though he did not make another appearance in the competition until 1994, when he played for Essex Second XI. The following month, he also played in matches for Hampshire, Leicestershire, and Northamptonshire Second XI teams.

Receiving British citizenship in early 1995, Atkins was signed to a one-year deal with Northamptonshire in February 1995. During the 1995 season, Atkins made his only first-class appearance, against Surrey. From the tailend, he scored 5 runs in the first innings in which he batted, and 8 not out in the second. From 11 overs of bowling, he took figures of 1–46, his only wicket being that of Mark Butcher.

Atkins made a single List A appearance in the same season, though he did not bat in the match.

Between 1997 and 1998, Atkins played for Cumberland in the Minor Counties Championship and MCC Trophy.
