= Arthur Wells =

English cricketer

Arthur Luty Wells (1909–1988) was an English cricketer active from 1953 to 1957 who played for Northamptonshire (Northants). He was born in Headingley, Leeds on 23 November 1909 and died in Northampton on 13 May 1988. Wells appeared in five first-class matches as a righthanded batsman who bowled right arm medium pace. He scored 28 runs with a highest score of 18 and took eight wickets with a best performance of four for 67.
