= Francis Kendall =

English cricketer

Personal information
- Full name: Francis James Kendall
- Born: 25 July 1908; Hardingstone, Northamptonshire, England
- Died: 10 September 1966 (aged 58); Northampton, Northamptonshire, England
- Batting: Left-handed
- Bowling: Left-arm medium

Domestic team information
- Years: Team
- 1930: Northamptonshire

Career statistics
Competition	First-class
Matches	3
Runs scored	1
Batting average	0.20
100s/50s	–/–
Top score	1*
Balls bowled	377
Wickets	6
Bowling average	28.66
5 wickets in innings	–
10 wickets in match	–
Best bowling	2/26
Catches/stumpings	2/–
- Source: Cricinfo, 13 April 2013

Francis James Kendall (25 July 1908 – 10 September 1966) was an English cricketer. Kendall was a left-handed batsman who left-arm medium pace. He was born at Hardingstone, Northamptonshire.

Kendall made his first-class debut for Northamptonshire in the 1930 County Championship against Kent at the Crabble Athletic Ground, Dover. He made two further first-class appearances in that season's County Championship, against Hampshire at Dean Park, Bournemouth, and Nottinghamshire at the County Ground, Northampton. He took a total of 6 wickets in his three appearances, which came at an average of 28.66, with best figures of 2/26.

He died at Northampton, Northamptonshire on 10 September 1966.
