= Robert Tindall =

English cricketer (born 1959)

Robert Michael Tindall is a former English cricketer. He was active from 1979 to 1981 and played for Northamptonshire (Northants).

== Early life ==
He was born in Harrow-on-the-Hill, Middlesex on 16 June 1959.

== Career ==
He appeared in fourteen first-class matches as a lefthanded batsman who bowled left-arm orthodox spin. He top scored for the county seconds in 1979 with 836 runs but struggled with the transition to the first team. He said that playing 12th man for the 1st team was not good for his career while future England players like D Capel and R Bailey were blossoming in the 2nd team. His most memorable moment was his first 1st Class wicket. Viv Richards c and b Tindall 131!. He scored 330 runs with a highest score of 60 not out and took four wickets with a best performance of two for one. He once scored 151 and took five wickets for Harrow vs Eton.

In 2016 Tindall's performance reached new heights. Tindall carried his bat in a low scoring chase against Gerrard's Cross.
