= Charles Tomblin =

English cricketer

Charles Bryan Tomblin (29 June 1891 – 1 June 1918) was an English cricketer active in 1914 who played for Northamptonshire (Northants). He was born in Brixworth, Northamptonshire and died near Sissonne, France, during World War I. He appeared in two first-class matches as a righthanded batsman who scored eight runs with a highest score of three.
