= Norman Grimshaw =

English cricketer

Personal information
- Born: 5 May 1910; Leeds, Yorkshire
- Died: 1979; Leeds, Yorkshire
- Batting: Right-handed
- Bowling: Right-arm slow

Career statistics
Competition	First-class
Matches	78
Runs scored	2,445
Batting average	17.34
100s/50s	0/12
Top score	92
Balls bowled	569
Wickets	6
Bowling average	71.16
5 wickets in innings	0
10 wickets in match	0
Best bowling	2/60
Catches/stumpings	21/–
- Source: CricketArchive, 6 December 2022

Frederick Norman Grimshaw (1910–1979) was an English cricketer active from 1927 to 1938 who played for Northamptonshire (Northants). He was born in Leeds on 5 May 1910. He appeared in 78 first-class matches as a righthanded batsman who bowled right arm slow. He scored 2,445 runs with a highest score of 92 and took six wickets with a best performance of two for 60. He also played for Yorkshire second XI in the Minor Counties championship from 1927 to 1932.

He died in Leeds in 1979.
