= Vincent Flynn =

English cricketer

Personal information
- Full name: Vincent Anthony Flynn
- Born: 30 October 1955 (age 71); Aylesbury, Buckinghamshire, England
- Batting: Right-handed
- Bowling: Wicket-keeper

Domestic team information
- Years: Team
- 1980–1982: Buckinghamshire
- 1976–1978: Northamptonshire

Career statistics
Competition	First-class	List A
Matches	3	2
Runs scored	21	5
Batting average	21.00	5.00
100s/50s	–/–	–/–
Top score	15	5
Balls bowled	–	–
Wickets	–	–
Bowling average	–	–
5 wickets in innings	–	–
10 wickets in match	–	–
Best bowling	–	–
Catches/stumpings	4/–	1/1
- Source: Cricinfo, 11 May 2011

Vincent Anthony Flynn (born 3 October 1955) is a former English cricketer. Flynn was a right-handed batsman who fielded as a wicket-keeper. He was born in Aylesbury, Buckinghamshire.

Flynn made his first-class debut for Northamptonshire against Oxford University in 1976. He played two further first-class matches for Northamptonshire, both coming in the 1978 County Championship against Yorkshire and Leicestershire. In his three first-class matches he scored 21 runs at a batting average of 21.00, with a high score of 15. It was for Northamptonshire that he played two List A matches in 1978 against Leicestershire and Nottinghamshire in the John Player League. He batted once, in the match against Leicestershire, scoring 5 runs before being dismissed by Ken Higgs.

Flynn later joined Buckinghamshire, making his debut for the county in the 1980 Minor Counties Championship against Bedfordshire. He played Minor counties cricket for Buckinghamshire from 1980 to 1982, which included nine Minor Counties Championship matches.
