= Robin Sutcliffe =

English cricketer

Personal information
- Full name: Robin Victor Sutcliffe
- Born: 10 July 1980 (age 46); Hemel Hempstead, Hertfordshire, England
- Batting: Right-handed
- Bowling: Right-arm fast-medium

Domestic team information
- Years: Team
- 1999: Northamptonshire

Career statistics
Competition	First-class
Matches	2
Runs scored	9
Batting average	9
100s/50s	–/–
Top score	9*
Balls bowled	330
Wickets	4
Bowling average	41.00
5 wickets in innings	–
10 wickets in match	–
Best bowling	2/88
Catches/stumpings	–/–
- Source: Cricinfo, 30 September 2010

Robin Victor Sutcliffe (born 10 July 1980) is a former English cricketer. Sutcliffe was a right-handed batsman who bowled right-arm fast-medium. He was born in Hemel Hempstead, Hertfordshire.

Sutcliffe played 2 first-class for Northamptonshire in 1999, against Cambridge University and Sri Lanka A. In 2 first-class matches, he scored 6 runs at a batting average of 6.00, with a high score of 6*. With the ball he took 4 wickets at a bowling average of 41.00, with best figures of 2/88.
