= Sydney Smith (cricketer, born 1892) =

English cricketer

Sydney Francis Smith was an English cricketer who played two first-class matches for Northamptonshire in 1914, scoring a total of sixteen runs. He was born in Northampton on 30 September 1892 but details of his death are unknown. He did not continue his cricket career after the First World War.
