= Harold Goodwin (cricketer) =

English cricketer (1886–1917)

Harold Goodwin in 1910

Harold James Goodwin (31 January 1886 – 24 April 1917) was an English first-class cricketer who played in 39 matches for Cambridge University and Warwickshire between 1906 and 1912. He captained Warwickshire in 1910.

Goodwin was born in Edgbaston, Birmingham, and was educated at Marlborough College, where he was in the cricket First XI 1903–05, and its captain in 1905. He then went up to Jesus College, Cambridge, where he studied Mathematics and gained blues for both cricket and hockey. After Cambridge he became a solicitor.

During World War I he was commissioned in the Royal Garrison Artillery and was killed at Arras, France, where he is buried at the Faubourg-d'Amiens cemetery.
