= William Walker (English cricketer) =

English cricketer

William Percy Walker (1889–1938) was an English cricketer active from 1908 to 1926 who played for Northamptonshire (Northants). He appeared in seven first-class matches as a righthanded batsman. Walker was born in Northampton on 11 April 1889 and died there on 6 February 1938. He scored 113 runs with a highest score of 48.
