= Robert Robinson (cricketer, born 1924) =

English cricketer

Robert Geoffrey Robinson was an English cricketer active from 1929 to 1948 who played for Northamptonshire (Northants). He was born in Wellingborough on 23 September 1924 and died there on 21 December 1973. He appeared in four first-class matches as a righthanded batsman who bowled left-arm orthodox spin. He scored 85 runs with a highest score of 53 and took no wickets.
