= Matthew Wheeler =

English cricketer

Personal information
- Full name: Matthew Benjamin Harold Wheeler
- Born: 14 August 1962 (age 64); Windlesham, Surrey, England
- Batting: Right-handed
- Bowling: Right-arm medium-fast
- Relatives: Grace Wheeler (daughter)

Domestic team information
- Years: Team
- 1985: Northamptonshire

Career statistics
Competition	First-class
Matches	2
Runs scored	–
Batting average	–
100s/50s	–/–
Top score	–
Balls bowled	204
Wickets	1
Bowling average	117.00
5 wickets in innings	–
10 wickets in match	–
Best bowling	1/87
Catches/stumpings	–/–
- Source: Cricinfo, 16 November 2011

Matthew Benjamin Harold Wheeler (born 14 August 1962) is a former English cricketer. Wheeler was a right-handed batsman who bowled right-arm medium-fast. He was born at Windlesham, Surrey and educated at Winchester College and the University of Exeter.

Wheeler made two first-class appearances for Northamptonshire in 1985 against Leicestershire at Grace Road, Leicester, and the touring Australians at the County Ground, Northampton. In the match against Leicestershire he wasn't required to bat and went wicketless. Against the Australians he again wasn't required to bat, but did take the wicket of Kepler Wessels (caught by Allan Lamb).

After his cricket career, he has developed a successful career in sports marketing, including participation in investments in DC United (a US MLS soccer franchise) and Eintracht Frankfurt (a football team in the German Bundesliga). In 2009 he became a non-executive director of the Professional Cricketers Association (PCA). He was appointed non-executive chairman of the PCA in 2015, a post he held until he stepped down in 2019.

In October 2021, Wheeler and his company, A&W Capital, were the exclusive advisor to CVC Capital Partners on their acquisition of the Ahmedabad franchise in the Indian Premier League (IPL). Wheeler then worked with CVC to create and launch the Gujarat Titans which became IPL champions in 2022, its first year.
