= Alfred Dickens (cricketer) =

English cricketer

Alfred Dickens (9 December 1883 – 30 January 1938) was an English cricketer who played for Northamptonshire. He was born in Brixworth and died in Bedford.

Dickens made four Minor Counties Championship appearances between 1898 and 1902, prior to Northamptonshire's entry into first-class cricket in 1905.

Dickens made a single first-class appearance, during the 1907 season, against Warwickshire. From the tailend, he scored a duck in the first innings in which he batted and three runs in the second. He bowled a single over and took the wicket of Harold Goodwin in it at a cost of four runs.
