= Ian Hawtin =

English cricketer

Personal information
- Full name: Ian Anthony Hawtin
- Born: 10 October 1966 (age 60); Bicester, Oxfordshire, England
- Batting: Right-handed
- Role: Wicket-keeper

Domestic team information
- Years: Team
- 1995–present: Oxfordshire

Career statistics
Competition	List A
Matches	6
Runs scored	46
Batting average	15.33
100s/50s	–/–
Top score	20*
Balls bowled	–
Wickets	–
Bowling average	–
5 wickets in innings	–
10 wickets in match	–
Best bowling	–
Catches/stumpings	7/–
- Source: Cricinfo, 20 May 2011

Ian Anthony Hawtin (born 10 October 1966) is an English cricketer. Hawtin is a right-handed batsman who fields as a wicket-keeper. He was born in Bicester, Oxfordshire.

Hawtin made his debut for Oxfordshire in the 1995 Minor Counties Championship against Shropshire. Hawtin has played Minor counties cricket for Oxfordshire from 1995 to present, which has included 94 Minor Counties Championship matches and 48 MCCA Knockout Trophy matches. He made his List A debut against the Durham Cricket Board in the 1999 NatWest Trophy. He played 5 further List A matches, the last coming against Herefordshire in the 1st round of the 2004 Cheltenham & Gloucester Trophy which was held in 2003. In his 6 List A matches, he scored 46 runs at a batting average of 15.33, with a high score of 20*. Behind the stumps he took 7 catches.

He has previously played for the Derbyshire Second XI in 1989.
