= Mark Cox Jr. =

English cricketer (1905–1979)

Personal information
- Full name: Mark Henry David Cox
- Born: 5 December 1905; Abington, Northamptonshire, England
- Died: 27 March 1979 (aged 73); Pontypridd, Glamorgan, Wales
- Batting: Right-handed
- Bowling: Right-arm slow
- Relatives: Mark Cox senior (father); Arthur Cox (brother)

Domestic team information
- Years: Team
- 1932: Northamptonshire

Career statistics
Competition	First-class
Matches	3
Runs scored	8
Batting average	2.00
100s/50s	–/–
Top score	5
Balls bowled	87
Wickets	2
Bowling average	31.00
5 wickets in innings	–
10 wickets in match	–
Best bowling	2/11
Catches/stumpings	1/–
- Source: Cricinfo, 18 November 2011

Mark Henry David Cox (5 December 1905 – 27 March 1979) was an English cricketer. Cox was a right-handed batsman, who bowled right-arm slow. He was born at Abington, Northamptonshire.

Cox made three first-class appearances for Northamptonshire, in the 1932 County Championship against Gloucestershire, Kent, and Gloucestershire again. In his three first-class matches, he scored 8 runs at an average of 2.00, with a high score of 5. With the ball he took 2 wickets at a bowling average of 31.00, with best figures of 2/11.

He died at Pontypridd, Glamorgan, in Wales on 27 March 1979. His father (Mark), and brother (Arthur), both played first-class cricket.
