= Gilbert Tebbitt =

English cricketer

Gilbert George Tebbitt (13 September 1908 – 29 December 1993) was an English cricketer active from 1934 to 1938 who played for Northamptonshire (Northants). He was born in Welton Grange, Northamptonshire and appeared in eleven first-class matches as a righthanded batsman who scored 248 runs with a highest score of 41. He died in Northampton, aged 85.
