= Charles Thorneycroft =

English cricketer

Personal information
- Full name: Charles Bedford Thorneycroft
- Born: 27 July 1879; Litchborough, Northamptonshire, England
- Died: 31 July 1972 (aged 93); Daventry, Northamptonshire, England
- Batting: Unknown
- Bowling: Right-arm fast

Domestic team information
- Years: Team
- 1899–1907: Northamptonshire

Career statistics
Competition	First-class
Matches	2
Runs scored	5
Batting average	1.25
100s/50s	–/–
Top score	3
Balls bowled	96
Wickets	2
Bowling average	25.00
5 wickets in innings	–
10 wickets in match	–
Best bowling	1/14
Catches/stumpings	1/–
- Source: Cricinfo, 18 November 2011

Charles Bedford Thorneycroft (27 July 1879 – 31 July 1972) was an English cricketer. Thorneycroft's batting style is unknown, though it is known he bowled right-arm fast. He was born at Litchborough, Northamptonshire.

Thorneycroft made his debut for Northamptonshire in the 1899 Minor Counties Championship against Durham. Between 1899 and 1903, he made ten Minor Counties Championship appearances for Northamptonshire. Northamptonshire were granted first-class status for the 1905 season and were admitted to the County Championship. Thorneycroft later made two first-class appearances for the county in the 1907 County Championship against Kent and Warwickshire. In the match against Kent at the Private Banks Sports Ground, Catford Bridge, Thorneycroft took the wicket of Arthur Day. In Northamptonshire's first-innings, he was dismissed for a duck batting at number eleven by Charlie Blythe, and when Northamptonshire were forced to follow-on he was promoted to open the batting, scoring just 3 runs before being dismissed by the same bowler. In the match against Warwickshire at Edgbaston, he once again batted at number eleven in Northamptonshire's first-innings, during which he was dismissed for a duck by Sam Hargreave. In their second-innings he was promoted up the order once more, this time to number six, scoring 2 runs before being dismissed by the same bowler. Thorneycroft claimed the wicket of Crowther Charlesworth in Warwickshire's second-innings.

He died at Daventry, Northamptonshire on 31 July 1972.
