= George Vials =

English cricketer

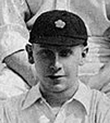

Personal information
- Full name: George Alfred Turner Vials
- Born: 18 March 1887; Northampton, England
- Died: 26 April 1974 (aged 87); Northampton, England
- Nickname: Tubby
- Batting: Right-handed

Domestic team information
- Years: Team
- 1905 to 1922: Northamptonshire

Career statistics
Competition	First-class
Matches	122
Runs scored	3808
Batting average	18.13
100s/50s	2/14
Top score	129
Balls bowled	12
Wickets	0
Bowling average	–
5 wickets in innings	–
10 wickets in match	–
Best bowling	–
Catches/stumpings	105/–
- Source: Cricinfo, 22 February 2018

George Alfred Turner "Tubby" Vials (18 March 1887 – 26 April 1974) was an English cricketer who played first-class cricket for Northamptonshire from 1905 to 1922 and was club captain from 1911 to 1913.

Vials was a right-handed batsman. His highest score was 129, against Hampshire in 1909 at Northampton, when Northamptonshire won by one wicket. His other century came in 1910 at Sheffield, when he scored 100, easily the highest score in the match; in the absence of the regular captain, Thomas Manning, Vials captained Northamptonshire to their first victory over Yorkshire. Under his captaincy in 1912 Northamptonshire finished a close second in the County Championship.

A knee injury and his work as a solicitor in Northampton limited his cricket after 1912. However, he remained involved with the cricket club until his death. He was club president from 1956 to 1968.

A native of Northampton who also died there, Vials attended Wellingborough School, not far from Northampton. He also played football for Northampton Town F.C. and hockey for Northamptonshire.
