= Archibald Sim =

South African cricketer

Personal information
- Full name: Archibald Millar Robertson Sim
- Born: 8 January 1942; Johannesburg, Transvaal Province, South Africa
- Died: 30 March 2023 (aged 81)
- Batting: Right-handed
- Bowling: Right-arm medium

Domestic team information
- Years: Team
- 1964–1966: Northamptonshire
- 1962/63: North Eastern Transvaal

Career statistics
Competition	First-class
Matches	7
Runs scored	196
Batting average	17.81
100s/50s	0/1
Top score	66*
Balls bowled	9
Wickets	1
Bowling average	12.00
5 wickets in innings	0
10 wickets in match	0
Best bowling	1/12
Catches/stumpings	2/–
- Source: Cricinfo, 15 November 2011

Archibald Millar Robertson Sim (8 January 1942 – 30 March 2023) was a South African cricketer. Sim was a right-handed batsman who bowled right-arm medium pace. He was born at Johannesburg, Transvaal Province.

Sim made his first-class debut for North Eastern Transvaal against Rhodesia in the 1962/63 Currie Cup. He made two further appearances in that season's competition, against Border and Rhodesia. In his three appearances, he scored 45 runs at an average of 9.00, with a high score of 17. He played county cricket for Northamptonshire in 1964, making his first-class debut for the county against Cambridge University. He made a further appearance in 1965 against Oxford University, before making two further appearances in 1966 against Oxford University and Nottinghamshire. In his four first-class appearances for Northamptonshire, he scored 151 runs at an average of 25.16, with a high score of 66 not out, which came against Oxford University in 1965.
