= Eric Tomkins =

English cricketer

Eric Feltham Tomkins was an English cricketer active from 1920 to 1921 who played for Northamptonshire (Northants). He was born in Rushden on 18 December 1892 and died there on 20 July 1980. He appeared in thirteen first-class matches as a righthanded batsman and scored 204 runs with a highest score of 50 not out.
