= Edgar Towell =

English cricketer

Edgar Fremantle Towell was an English cricketer active from 1923 to 1934 who played for Northamptonshire (Northants). He was born in Kettering on 5 July 1901 and died there on 2 June 1972. He appeared in 70 first-class matches as a lefthanded batsman who bowled right arm medium fast pace. He scored 1,199 runs with a highest score of 66 and took 102 wickets with a best performance of four for 42.
