= Thomas Clapperton =

English cricketer (1875–1939)

Thomas James Milner Clapperton (3 September 1875 – 26 May 1939) was an English cricketer who played for Northamptonshire. He was born in Market Deeping, Lincolnshire and died in Corby, Northamptonshire.

Clapperton made a single first-class appearance, during the 1909 season, against Yorkshire. From the tailend, he scored no runs in either the first or second innings in which he batted, and then took no wickets either. Northamptonshire drew the match and Clapperton never played for Northamptonshire again.
