= Arthur Sargent =

English cricketer

Arthur Harry Thomas Sargent (1908–1990) was an English cricketer active in 1932 who played for Northamptonshire (Northants). He was born in Northampton on 24 March 1908 and died there on 10 February 1990. He appeared in four first-class matches as a righthanded batsman who bowled right arm medium pace and off spin. He scored 41 runs with a highest score of 18 and took seven wickets with a best performance of five for 88.
