= Harold Snell (rugby union) =

- Born: Harold William Snell c. 1905 Newcastle, New South Wales

Rugby union career
- Position: scrum-half
International career
Years	Team	Apps	(Points)
1925–28	Wallabies	3	(0)

Harold William Snell (born c. 1905) was a rugby union player who represented Australia.

Snell, a scrum-half, was born in Newcastle, New South Wales and claimed a total of 3 international rugby caps for Australia.
