= Christopher Lubbock =

English cricketer

Christopher William Stuart Lubbock (4 January 1920 – 16 May 2000) was an English cricketer active from 1938 to 1954 who played for Northamptonshire (Northants). He was born in London and died in Colchester. He appeared in nine first-class matches as a righthanded batsman who bowled right arm medium pace and leg spin. He scored 189 runs with a highest score of 69 and took 25 wickets with a best performance of four for 44.

Lubbock was educated at Charterhouse, where he was captain of the cricket team, and Brasenose College, Oxford, where his studies for a law degree were interrupted by the outbreak of war in 1939. He served in the Royal Navy until 1946, then resumed his law studies and was called to the Bar at the Inner Temple in 1947. He was a Master of the Queen's Bench 1970–90.
