= Harold Benjamin =

English cricketer

Harold Lewis Benjamin was an English cricketer active from 1911 to 1919 who played for Northamptonshire (Northants). Born in Birmingham on 13 April 1892, he died in Tettenhall, Staffordshire on 7 August 1942. Benjamin appeared in three first-class matches as a righthanded batsman and a right-arm fast-medium bowler. He scored 37 runs with a highest score of 23 and took six wickets with his best figures being three for 38.
