= Norman Maltby =

English cricketer (born 1951)

Norman Maltby is an English former cricketer active from 1972 to 1974 who played for Northamptonshire (Northants). He appeared in nine first-class matches as a lefthanded batsman who bowled right arm medium pace. Maltby was born in Marske-by-the-Sea, Yorkshire on 16 July 1951. He scored 185 runs with a highest score of 59 and took two wickets with a best performance of two for 43.
