= Frederick Kitson =

English cricketer

Frederick Kitson (20 May 1893 – 25 January 1925) was an English cricketer active in 1919 and 1920 who played for Northamptonshire (Northants). He was born in Marylebone and died in Northampton. He appeared in four first-class matches as a lefthanded batsman who bowled left-arm orthodox spin. He scored 31 runs with a highest score of 13 and took three wickets with a best performance of three for 63.
