= William Denton (cricketer) =

English cricketer

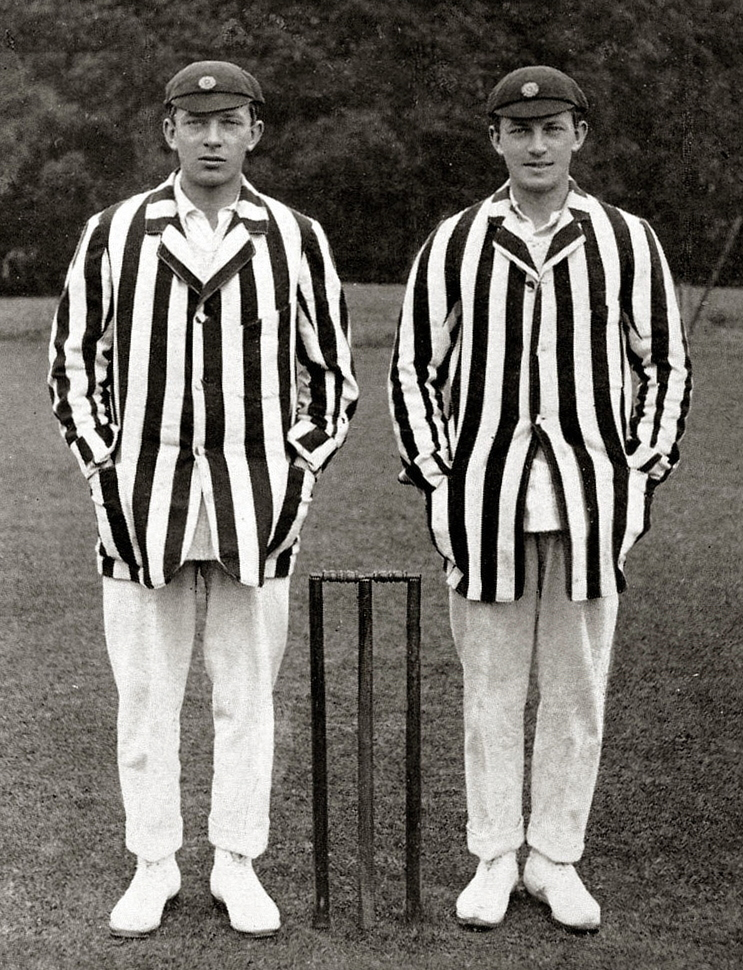
William and John Denton

William Herbert Denton (2 November 1890, in Rushden, Northamptonshire – 23 April 1979, in Bedford) was an English cricketer active from 1909 to 1924, who played for Northamptonshire (Northants) together with his twin brother John. Denton appeared in 119 first-class matches as a righthanded batsman, scoring 4,449 runs with a highest score of 230 not out, one of four centuries.
