= Chad Barrett (cricketer) =

South African cricketer (born 1989)

Personal information
- Full name: Chad Anthony Barrett
- Born: 22 May 1989 (age 37); Johannesburg, Transvaal Province, South Africa
- Batting: Right-handed
- Bowling: Right-arm medium-fast

Domestic team information
- Years: Team
- 2014–2016: Northamptonshire
- FC debut: 5 June 2014 Northants v Sri Lanka A
- Last FC: 31 August 2016 Northants v Glamorgan

Career statistics
Competition	First-class
Matches	3
Runs scored	138
Batting average	–
100s/50s	1/0
Top score	114*
Balls bowled	282
Wickets	2
Bowling average	104.50
5 wickets in innings	0
10 wickets in match	0
Best bowling	1/29
Catches/stumpings	6/–
- Source: CricketArchive, 15 December 2016

Chad Anthony Barrett (born 22 May 1989 in Johannesburg) is a South African cricketer active since 2014 who has played for Northamptonshire. He is a righthanded batsman who bowls right arm fast medium pace.

He made his first-class debut for Northamptonshire against Sri Lanka in June 2014, but did not play another first-class game for two years. In the meantime he played second team cricket for six different counties, before he was selected to play for Northants against Worcestershire. In this match he batted at number ten, and scored 114*, breaking the record score for a Northants number ten.

He is the director of cricket at Ealing Cricket Club. In 2022, he received the Outstanding Contribution to Coaching Development, an ECB Award. He recently completed the ECB Level 4 Coaching Program, becoming the youngest person to complete the course.
