= Leonard Cullen =

South African cricketer

Personal information
- Full name: Leonard Cullen
- Born: 23 November 1914; Johannesburg, Transvaal Province, South Africa
- Died: 15 September 1984 (aged 69); South Africa
- Batting: Right-handed
- Bowling: Right-arm medium

Domestic team information
- Years: Team
- 1934–1935: Northamptonshire

Career statistics
| Competition | First-class |
|---|---|
| Matches | 18 |
| Runs scored | 253 |
| Batting average | 8.43 |
| 100s/50s | –/– |
| Top score | 40 |
| Balls bowled | 1,063 |
| Wickets | 11 |
| Bowling average | 59.09 |
| 5 wickets in innings | – |
| 10 wickets in match | – |
| Best bowling | 3/73 |
| Catches/stumpings | 4/– |
- Source: Cricinfo, 19 November 2011

Leonard Cullen (23 November 1914 – 15 September 1984) was a South African cricketer. Cullen was a right-handed batsman who bowled right-arm medium pace. He was born at Johannesburg, Transvaal Province.

Cullen played all his first-class cricket in England for Northamptonshire, making his debut for the county against Middlesex in the 1934 County Championship. He made seventeen further first-class appearances, the last of which came against Nottinghamshire in the 1935 County Championship. In his eighteen first-class appearances, he scored 253 runs at an average of 8.43, with a high score of 40. With the ball, he took 11 wickets at a bowling average of 59.09, with best figures of 3/73.

He died in South Africa on 15 September 1984.

He is the father to Leonard cullen his son
