= Ronald Smith (cricketer) =

English cricketer

Personal information
- Full name: Ronald Smith
- Born: 16 February 1926; Dudley, Worcestershire, England
- Died: 3 March 2001 (aged 75); Worcester, Worcestershire, England
- Batting: Right-handed
- Bowling: Right-arm fast-medium

Domestic team information
- Years: Team
- 1954: Northamptonshire

Career statistics
Competition	First-class
Matches	1
Runs scored	19
Batting average	19.00
100s/50s	–/–
Top score	19*
Balls bowled	102
Wickets	1
Bowling average	38.00
5 wickets in innings	–
10 wickets in match	–
Best bowling	1/38
Catches/stumpings	–/–
- Source: Cricinfo, 31 August 2011

Ronald Smith (16 February 1926 – 3 March 2001) was an English cricketer. Smith was a right-handed batsman who bowled right-arm fast-medium. He was born in Dudley, Worcestershire.

Smith made a single first-class appearance for Northamptonshire against Surrey in the 1954 County Championship. In this match he took a single wicket, that of David Fletcher for the cost of 38 runs from 17 overs. With the bat he was dismissed for a duck in Northamptonshire's first-innings be Tony Lock, while in their second-innings he ended unbeaten on 19.

He died in Worcester, Worcestershire on 3 March 2001
