= Mark Cox (cricketer, born 1879) =

English cricketer

Mark Cox (1879–1968) was an English cricketer active from 1899 to 1919 who played for Northamptonshire (Northants). He appeared in 75 first-class matches as a left handed batsman who bowled right arm medium pace. Cox was born in Northampton on 10 May 1879 and died there on 18 December 1968. He scored 1,808 runs with a highest score of 78 and took 25 wickets with a best performance of three for 22. His sons were Arthur Cox and Mark Cox junior who also played for Northants.
