= Richard Venes =

English cricketer

Personal information
- Full name: Richard Stephen Venes
- Born: 12 March 1885; Battersea, London, England
- Died: 10 June 1959 (aged 74); Northampton, Northamptonshire, England
- Batting: Right-handed
- Bowling: Leg break googly

Domestic team information
- Years: Team
- 1922: Northamptonshire

Career statistics
Competition	First-class
Matches	4
Runs scored	8
Batting average	1.33
100s/50s	–/–
Top score	4*
Balls bowled	193
Wickets	5
Bowling average	21.00
5 wickets in innings	–
10 wickets in match	–
Best bowling	4/60
Catches/stumpings	1/–
- Source: Cricinfo, 18 November 2011

Richard Stephen Venes (12 March 1885 – 10 June 1959) was an English cricketer. Venes was a right-handed batsman who bowled leg break googly. He was born at Battersea, London.

Venes made four first-class appearances for Northamptonshire in the 1922 County Championship against Yorkshire, Derbyshire, Lancashire and in a second match against Yorkshire. In his four first-class matches, he scored 8 runs at an average of 1.33, with a high score of 4 not out. With the ball he took 4 wickets at a bowling average of 21.00, with best figures of 4/60.

He died at Northampton, Northamptonshire on 10 June 1959.
