= Robert Knight (cricketer, born 1879) =

English cricketer (1879–1955)

- Born: 1879; Rushden, England
- Died: 1955 (aged 75–76); Kettering, England
- Occupation: Cricketer

Robert Frank Knight (August 10, 1879 - January 9, 1955) was an English cricketer active from 1900 to 1921 who played for Northamptonshire (Northants). He was born in Rushden on 10 August 1879 and died in Kettering on 9 January 1955. He appeared in 22 first-class matches as a righthanded batsman who bowled leg spin. He scored 408 runs with a highest score of 67 and took 21 wickets with a best performance of six for 90.
