= Reginald Wooster =

English cricketer

Personal information
- Full name: Reginald Wooster
- Born: 19 January 1903; Kettering, Northamptonshire, England
- Died: 12 September 1968 (aged 65); Kettering, Northamptonshire, England
- Batting: Right-handed
- Bowling: Right-arm medium

Domestic team information
- Years: Team
- 1925: Northamptonshire

Career statistics
Competition	First-class
Matches	1
Runs scored	6
Batting average	6.00
100s/50s	–/–
Top score	6
Balls bowled	132
Wickets	6
Bowling average	12.83
5 wickets in innings	1
10 wickets in match	–
Best bowling	5/54
Catches/stumpings	–/–
- Source: Cricinfo, 18 November 2011

Reginald Wooster (19 January 1903 – 12 September 1968) was an English cricketer. Wooster was a right-handed batsman who bowled right-arm medium pace. He was born in Kettering, Northamptonshire.

Wooster made a single first-class appearance for Northamptonshire against Dublin University in 1925. In his match, he took the wicket of James Wills for the cost of 23 runs from 9 overs. He followed this by scoring six runs in Northamptonshire's only innings of the match before being dismissed by James Willis. In Dublin University's second innings, Wooster took five wickets for 54 runs from 13 overs. Wooster's final three wickets were taken with consecutive balls, and this is the only case of a bowler getting a hat-trick in his only first-class match. Despite this, he never played for Northamptonshire again. According to Keith Walmsley, author of Brief Candles, a book about cricketers who only played in one first-class match, Wooster was invited to play for Northamptonshire on further occasions but had to decline due to business commitments.

He died at the town of his birth on 12 September 1968.
