= Harold Pretty =

English cricketer

Personal information
- Full name: Harold Cooper Pretty
- Born: 23 October 1875; Fressingfield, Suffolk, England
- Died: 30 May 1952 (aged 76); Kettering, Northamptonshire, England
- Batting: Right-handed
- Bowling: Right-arm offbreak
- Role: Batsman

Domestic team information
- Years: Team
- 1899: Surrey
- 1906–1907: Northamptonshire
- FC debut: 7 August 1899 Surrey v Notts
- Last FC: 30 August 1907 Northants v Essex

Career statistics
Competition	First-class
Matches	16
Runs scored	696
Batting average	26.76
100s/50s	2/2
Top score	200
Balls bowled	190
Wickets	5
Bowling average	27.60
5 wickets in innings	0
10 wickets in match	0
Best bowling	3/39
Catches/stumpings	9/–
- Source: CricketArchive, 1 June 2020

Harold Cooper Pretty (23 October 1875 – 30 May 1952) was an English cricketer who played for Surrey and Northamptonshire County Cricket Clubs. He was born in Fressingfield, Suffolk and died at Kettering, Northamptonshire, where he was a medical practitioner.

Pretty appeared in sixteen first-class matches as a right-handed batsman who bowled occasional off spin. He played eight times for Surrey in 1899, starting his career with an innings of 124 against Nottinghamshire when he opened the batting alongside Bobby Abel; Wisden Cricketers' Almanack termed it "a masterly innings". He surpassed that innings in his second match for Northamptonshire in 1906, when he made exactly 200 in 200 minutes with 35 fours against Derbyshire: Wisden commented that he took "any number of risks" but gave only two real chances, and that he made the rest of the batting in the match appear "quite commonplace".
