= Harry Longland =

English cricketer (1881–1911)

Harry Longland (3 May 1881 – 20 September 1911) was an English cricketer who played for Northamptonshire. He was born in Leicester and died in Fenny Stratford.

Longland made a single first-class appearance for the team, during the 1907 season. However, he neither batted nor bowled for the team, and took no catches, in a match in which there was no play on the first day. However, in the same match, George Thompson hit a hat-trick for the team.
