= Charles Thorp (cricketer) =

English cricketer

Charles Thorp (1882–1953) was an English farmer, and a cricketer active from 1908 to 1909 who played for Northamptonshire (Northants).

== Life ==
He was born in Fotheringhay on 11 August 1882, the youngest son of Thomas Thorp (1834–1902) of Park Lodge, Fotheringhay, and his wife Elizabeth Jane Brewer (1839–1926). He was educated at Oundle School. By the 1840s Park Lodge Farm was used to raise animals, and Thomas Thorp bred shire horses.

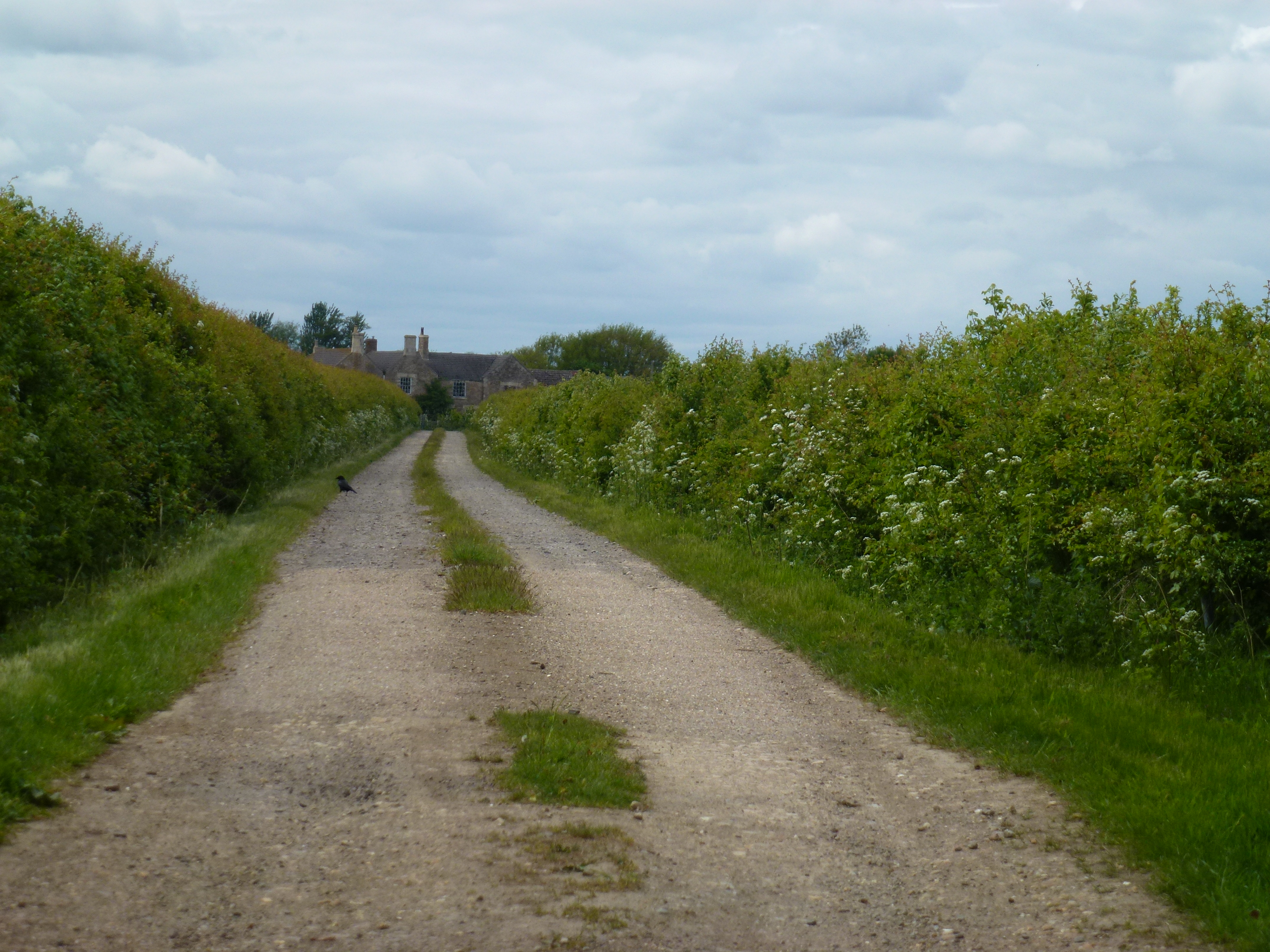
Park Lodge, Fotheringhay, view from the driveway, 2015 photograph

Charles Thorp died at Fotheringhay on 5 May 1953. At the time of his death, his occupation was given as farmer, and his address Garden Farm, Fotheringhay.

== Cricket ==
In a club match in 1907, Thorp hit 140 for Oundle Town against Nottinghamshire Club and Ground, whose attack included Sydney Gordon Smith. Supporting him in what the Northampton Mercury called a "brilliant innings" was James John Kearney with 82, a Cambridge graduate who died in 1915 at Gallipoli.

Thorp over the following two years appeared in nine first-class matches as a righthanded batsman who scored 195 runs with a highest score of 50. He played further cricket for the Lord Lilford XI, with patron John Powys, 5th Baron Lilford.

== Family ==
Thorp married in 1921 Emilie Rebecca Hodgson, who died in 1936. During World War I she was in service at Nunthorpe Hall in Yorkshire, with the Voluntary Aid Detachment.
