= Joseph Beasley =

English cricketer (1881–1960)

Joseph Noble Beasley was an English cricketer active from 1911 to 1919 who played for Northamptonshire and was club captain in the 1919 season. He was born in Dallington, Northampton on 5 December 1881 and died in Stony Stratford, Buckinghamshire on 23 January 1960. Beasley appeared in sixteen first-class matches as a righthanded batsman who bowled right arm fast medium pace. He scored 100 runs with a highest score of 21 and took five wickets with a best performance of one for 6.
