= Mike Warrington =

English cricketer

John Michael Warrington (1924–2010) was an English cricketer active from 1950 to 1956 who played for Northamptonshire (Northants). He appeared in two first-class matches as a righthanded batsman who bowled right arm medium pace. Warrington was born in Northampton on 7 March 1924 and is known to have died in Australia in 2010. He scored 18 runs with a highest score of 18 and took three wickets with a best performance of one for 30.
