= Francis Musson =

English cricketer

Francis William Musson CB CMG AFC (31 May 1894 – 2 January 1962) was a British civil servant whose career was associated with the development of aviation. He was born in Clitheroe and died in Chatham. He retired as an Under-Secretary, attached to the Foreign Office.

In addition to his civil service career, he was an English cricketer active from 1914 to 1927, playing for Lancashire. He appeared in 19 first-class matches as a right-handed batsman and wicketkeeper. During his cricket career, he scored 539 runs, with a highest score of 75, and achieved 13 catches with four stumpings.
