= Kenneth Rymill =

English cricketer

Personal information
- Full name: Kenneth James Rymill
- Born: 30 August 1906; Northampton, Northamptonshire, England
- Died: 31 May 1977 (aged 70); Northampton, Northamptonshire, England
- Batting: Right-handed

Domestic team information
- Years: Team
- 1926–1932: Northamptonshire

Career statistics
| Competition | First-class |
|---|---|
| Matches | 4 |
| Runs scored | 35 |
| Batting average | 5.83 |
| 100s/50s | –/– |
| Top score | 28 |
| Balls bowled | – |
| Wickets | – |
| Bowling average | – |
| 5 wickets in innings | – |
| 10 wickets in match | – |
| Best bowling | – |
| Catches/stumpings | 1/– |
- Source: Cricinfo, 21 October 2012

Kenneth James Rymill (30 August 1906 – 31 May 1977) was an English cricketer. Rymill was a right-handed batsman. He was born at Northampton, Northamptonshire.

Rymill made his first-class debut for Northamptonshire against Dublin University in 1926 at the County Ground, Northampton. His next first-class appearance for the county came in 1932, against Somerset in the County Championship. He made two further first-class appearances in that season's County Championship, against Kent and Gloucestershire. In his four first-class matches for the county, he scored just 35 runs at an average of 5.83, with a high score of 28.

He died at the town of his birth on 31 May 1977.
