= Albert Wright (cricketer, born 1899) =

English cricketer

Albert Wright was an English cricketer active from 1919 to 1920 who played for Northamptonshire (Northants). He appeared in three first-class matches as a righthanded batsman who bowled right arm medium pace. One of four brothers who played cricket, Wright was born in Kettering on 8 August 1899 and died in Bognor Regis on 1 October 1987. He scored 81 runs with a highest score of 27 and took six wickets with a best performance of three for 6.
