= Mike Cawdron =

English cricketer

Mike Cawdron (born 7 October 1974) is a former English cricketer. He was a left-handed batsman and a right-arm medium-pace bowler. During his five years in first-class cricket, he played for Gloucestershire and Northamptonshire, representing the latter in Twenty20 cricket during 2003.

Cawdron's debut in first-class cricket came in August 1999, where he took five wickets against a strong Hampshire side, and made 42 runs, after closing out on the first day at the crease with Jack Russell.

He played extensively in the Second XI championship between 1992, where he debuted for Gloucestershire in August but failed to make too much of an impression, finishing the match with a mere single run to his credit. Thereon, he played regularly from 1999 onwards. Though he spent season 2002 out of the game, he played first-class cricket for five years, scoring decently throughout, and finishing with a workable average of 14. He finished his career in 2004, playing for Northamptonshire for his last two years. Michael Cawdron was the master in charge of Cricket, Rackets Professional and teacher of Mathematics at Haileybury School. In September 2016, he was appointed teacher of Mathematics at Wellington College, Berkshire.
