= Stephen Wright (cricketer) =

English cricketer

Stephen Wright was an English cricketer active from 1922 to 1923 who played for Northamptonshire. He appeared in nine first-class matches as a righthanded batsman. One of four brothers who played cricket, Wright was born in Kettering on 6 August 1897 and died in Weston-super-Mare on 24 June 1975. He scored 188 runs with a highest score of 44.
