= Nicholas Wright (cricketer, born 1901) =

English cricketer

Nicholas Edward Wright was an English cricketer active from 1921 to 1922 who played for Northamptonshire (Northants). He appeared in eight first-class matches as a righthanded batsman who bowled right arm medium pace. Wright was born in Kettering, Northamptonshire on 28 August 1901 and died in Corby, Northamptonshire on 20 May 1974. He scored 30 runs with a highest score of 8 and took two wickets with a best performance of two for 59.
