= William Hawtin =

English cricketer

William Henry Hawtin (18 January 1908 – 27 March 1940) was an English cricketer active from 1929 to 1938 who played for Northamptonshire (Northants). He was born in Northampton on 18 January 1908 and died in Wigan on 27 March 1940. He appeared in four first-class matches as a righthanded batsman who bowled right arm medium pace. He scored 51 runs with a highest score of 24 and took one wicket with a best performance of one for 9. In 1940, Hawtin died in an accidental explosion at work.
