= Arthur Childs-Clarke =

English cricketer (1905–1980)

Personal information
- Full name: Arthur Williams Childs-Clarke
- Born: 13 May 1905; Exeter, Devon, England
- Died: 19 February 1980 (aged 74); Mevagissey, Cornwall, England
- Batting: Right-handed
- Bowling: Right-arm leg spin
- Role: All-rounder

Domestic team information
- Years: Team
- 1923–1934: Middlesex
- 1947–1948: Northamptonshire

Career statistics
Competition	First-class
Matches	66
Runs scored	1,674
Batting average	17.08
100s/50s	0/7
Top score	68
Balls bowled	2,240
Wickets	25
Bowling average	43.92
5 wickets in innings	0
10 wickets in match	0
Best bowling	3/72
Catches/stumpings	31/–
- Source: CricketArchive, 6 April 2010

Arthur William Childs-Clarke (13 May 1905 – 19 February 1980) was an English first-class cricketer who played for Middlesex and Northamptonshire.

== Career ==
Born in Exeter, he played 10 times for Middlesex between 1923 and 1934, and captained the second XI from then until the outbreak of World War II. In 1947 he took over the captaincy of Northamptonshire for two seasons in which the county finished bottom both years, managing to win only five out of 56 matches. Childs-Clarke averaged 18.31 in 1947 and 13.16 the following year.
