= Thomas Horton (cricketer) =

English cricketer

Thomas Horton (1871–1932) was an English cricketer active from 1895 to 1906 who played for Northamptonshire (Northants) and was club captain in 1905 and 1906. He was born in Edgbaston on 16 May 1871 and died in Rugby, Warwickshire on 18 June 1932. He appeared in 29 first-class matches as a righthanded batsman who scored 581 runs with a highest score of 53.
