= Ronald Knight =

English cricketer

Ronald Knight (12 May 1913 – October 1991) was an English cricketer active from 1933 to 1934 who played for Northamptonshire (Northants).

Knight was born in Northampton. He appeared in ten first-class matches as a righthanded batsman who bowled right arm fast. He scored 182 runs with a highest score of 50 and took ten wickets with a best performance of five for 108. He died in the New Forest, Hampshire, aged 78.
