= Roger Hawtin =

English cricketer

Roger William Rawlins Hawtin (30 September 1880 – 7 September 1917) was an English cricketer active from 1901 to 1908 who played for Northamptonshire (Northants). He was born in Bugbrooke, Northamptonshire on 30 September 1880 and died in Abington, Northamptonshire on 7 September 1917. He appeared in 19 first-class matches as a righthanded batsman who bowled right arm medium pace in 37 inns. He scored 508 runs with a highest score of 65 and took 22 wickets with a best performance of five for 33.
