= George Pennington (cricketer) =

English cricketer

George Arthur Adam Septimus Carter Trenchard Sale Pennington was an English cricketer active in 1927 who played for Northamptonshire (Northants). He appeared in twelve first-class matches as a righthanded batsman. Pennington was born in Cote Brook, Cheshire on 28 April 1899 and died in Armthorpe, Doncaster on 15 September 1933. He scored 259 runs with a highest score of 47. Pennington died in an airplane crash in 1933 that also injured jockey Gordon Richards.
