= Arthur Worsley (cricketer) =

English cricketer

Arthur Edward Worsley (10 October 1882 – 10 August 1969) was an English cricketer active from 1903 to 1906 who played for Northamptonshire (Northants).

He was born in Brackley, Northamptonshire on 10 October 1882 and died in Watchet, Somerset on 10 August 1969 aged 86.

He appeared in sixteen first-class matches as a righthanded batsman who scored 478 runs with a highest score of 86 and took four wickets with a best performance of three for 20.
