= Rawlins Hawtin =

English cricketer

Alfred Powell Rawlins Hawtin was an English cricketer active from 1902 to 1930 who played for and captained Northamptonshire. He was born in Bugbrooke, Northamptonshire on 1 February 1883 and died in Abington, Northamptonshire on 15 January 1975. He appeared in 86 first-class matches as a righthanded batsman who scored 3,595 runs with a highest score of 135, one of three centuries.
