= Sam Sweeney (cricketer) =

English cricketer

Personal information
- Full name: Samuel Alan Sweeney
- Born: 15 March 1990 (age 36); Preston, Lancashire, England
- Batting: Right-handed
- Bowling: Right-arm medium

Domestic team information
- Years: Team
- 2011–2013: Northamptonshire

Career statistics
Competition	List A
Matches	2
Runs scored	–
Batting average	–
100s/50s	–/–
Top score	–
Balls bowled	30
Wickets	–
Bowling average	–
5 wickets in innings	–
10 wickets in match	–
Best bowling	–
Catches/stumpings	–/–
- Source: Cricinfo, 27 January 2016

Samuel Alan Sweeney (born 15 March 1990) is an English cricketer. Sweeney is a right-handed batsman who bowls right-arm fast medium pace. He was born at Preston, Lancashire. He was educated at Parklands High School, Chorley, before attending Myerscough College, Manchester.

Sweeney made his debut for Northamptonshire in a List A match against Warwickshire in the 2011 Clydesdale Bank 40 at Edgbaston, in what was his only appearance for the county in that season. In September 2011, he signed a two-year contract with Northamptonshire, but only played one more first-team match, an elbow injury cut his time short at Northants, Sweeney enjoyed success in second eleven cricket both in red and white ball formats. He was released by the club at the end of the 2013 season due to injury on his elbow, after he had operations on the injury he has since has been a league professional in Lancashire and also played overseas as a pro in New Zealand as of late.

He played as a professional for Penzance Cricket Club in 2015.
