= Peter Murray-Willis =

English cricketer

Personal information
- Full name: Peter Earnshaw Murray-Willis
- Born: 14 July 1910; Castle Bromwich, Warwickshire, England
- Died: 7 July 1995 (aged 84); Uckfield Park, Sussex, England
- Batting: Right-handed

Domestic team information
- Years: Team
- 1935–1936: Worcestershire
- 1938–1946: Northamptonshire

Career statistics
| Competition | First-class |
|---|---|
| Matches | 29 |
| Runs scored | 467 |
| Batting average | 10.37 |
| 100s/50s | 0/1 |
| Top score | 54 |
| Catches/stumpings | 3/– |
- Source: CricketArchive, 7 September 2007

Peter Earnshaw Murray-Willis (14 July 1910 – 7 July 1995) was an English first-class cricketer. He played 29 times at first-class level either side of the Second World War, at first for Worcestershire and then for Northamptonshire.

Despite his short career, in 1946 he not only won his county cap for Northamptonshire, but also captained the county on 18 occasions. A Wisden writer much later called him a "somewhat miscast captain".

Murray-Willis passed fifty only once in his first-class career: making 54 for Northamptonshire against his former county of Worcestershire, in a high-scoring match at Kidderminster in July 1946.
