= Reginald Raven =

English cricketer

Personal information
- Full name: Reginald Owen Raven
- Born: 26 November 1884; Baldock, Hertfordshire, England
- Died: 4 April 1936 (aged 51); Eastbourne, Sussex, England

Domestic team information
- Years: Team
- 1905–1921: Northamptonshire

Reginald Owen Raven (26 November 1884 – 4 April 1936) was an English cricketer who played for Northamptonshire from 1905 to 1921 and was club captain in the 1920 and 1921 seasons. He was born in Baldock, Hertfordshire, on 26 November 1884 and died in Eastbourne, Sussex, on 4 April 1936. He appeared in 31 first-class matches as a right-handed batsman and scored 766 runs with a highest score of 59.
