= William Brown (cricketer, born 1900) =

English cricketer

William Cecil Brown was an English cricketer who played for Northamptonshire from 1925 to 1937 and was club captain in the 1932 to 1935 seasons. He was born in Wellingborough on 13 November 1900 and died in Hove on 20 January 1986. He appeared in 127 first-class matches as a righthanded batsman and scored 2,601 runs with a highest score of 103 not out, his only century.
