= Richard Wright (cricketer, born 1903) =

English cricketer

Richard Leslie Wright (1903–1991) was an English cricketer active from 1923 to 1926 who played for Northamptonshire. He appeared in 54 first-class matches as a righthanded batsman who bowled right arm medium pace. One of four brothers who played cricket, Wright was born in Kettering on 28 October 1903 and died in Bournemouth on 31 July 1991. He scored 1,507 runs with a highest score of 112, one of two centuries, and took five wickets with a best performance of one for 11.
