= John Buswell =

English cricketer

John Edgar Buswell (3 July 1909 – August 1992) was an English cricketer active from 1936 to 1939 who played for Northamptonshire.

Buswell appeared in 61 first-class matches as a righthanded batsman who bowled right arm medium pace. He scored 525 runs with a highest score of 30 and took 172 wickets with a best performance of seven for 61.

He was born in Barnwell, Northamptonshire on 3 July 1909 and died in Ewecross, Yorkshire in August 1992.
