= Charles Pool (cricketer) =

English cricketer

Charles James Tomlin Pool (1876–1954) was an English cricketer active from 1893 to 1910 who played for Northamptonshire (Northants). He was born in Northampton on 21 January 1876 and died in Epsom, Surrey on 13 October 1954. Pool appeared in 94 first-class matches as a righthanded batsman. He scored 4,350 runs with a highest score of 166, one of four centuries.
