= 1931 County Championship =

English cricket tournament

- Cricket format: First-class cricket
- Tournament format: League system
- Champions: Yorkshire (15th title)

The 1931 County Championship was the 38th officially organised running of the County Championship. Yorkshire County Cricket Club won the championship title.

The method of scoring points was changed again. Fifteen points were awarded for the team winning a match and both teams received 7.5 points for a tied match.

== Table ==
County Championship table
Team	Pld	W	L	DWF	DLF	NR	Pts
Yorkshire	28	16	1	4	1	6	287
Gloucestershire	28	11	4	7	5	1	219
Kent	28	12	7	3	3	3	216
Sussex	28	10	6	8	1	3	205
Nottinghamshire	28	9	3	9	6	1	202
Lancashire	28	7	4	7	6	4	174
Derbyshire	28	7	6	8	3	4	170
Surrey	28	6	4	7	7	4	162
Warwickshire	28	6	5	5	7	5*	156
Essex	28	7	11	5	4	1	146
Middlesex	28	5	8	9	2	4	142
Hampshire	28	5	9	4	6	4	129
Somerset	28	6	11	2	8	1	128
Worcestershire	28	5	10	4	7	2	124
Glamorgan	28	4	11	1	8	4	105
Leicestershire	28	2	7	7	10	2*	103
Northamptonshire	28	2	13	3	9	1	76

- includes one tie on first innings
