= Martin Ashenden =

English cricketer

Personal information
- Born: 4 August 1937 (age 89); Bexhill-on-Sea, Sussex, England
- Batting: Right-handed
- Bowling: Right-arm fast-medium
- Role: Bowler

Domestic team information
- Years: Team
- 1959–1961: Northamptonshire
- 1962–1965: Gloucestershire

Career statistics
Competition	FC	List A
Matches	34	1
Runs scored	70	0
Batting average	2.41	0.00
100s/50s	0/0	0/0
Top score	15	0
Balls bowled	4669	44
Wickets	64	2
Bowling average	32.73	15.50
5 wickets in innings	0	0
10 wickets in match	0	0
Best bowling	4/50	2/31
Catches/stumpings	9/0	1/0
- Source: Cricinfo, 31 July 2013

Martin Ashenden (born 4 August 1937) is an English former first-class cricketer. He played for Northamptonshire between 1959 and 1961 and for Gloucestershire between 1962 and 1965.

Ashenden was a right-arm fast-medium bowler. On his twenty-first birthday in 1958, playing for Bedfordshire against Shropshire in the Minor Counties Championship, he took 10 for 15 in the first innings, dismissing Shropshire for 37. He made his first-class debut the next season, and in his third match for Northamptonshire he took 3 for 69 and 4 for 50 against Essex. But he was never able to establish himself over three seasons at Northamptonshire and four at Gloucestershire, and he left first-class cricket after the 1965 season.
