= Tommy Askham =

English cricketer (1896–1916)

Sydney Thomas Askham (9 September 1896 – 21 August 1916) was an English cricketer who played for Northamptonshire in 1914. Born in Wellingborough, he attended Wellingborough School where he was, according to Wisden Cricketers' Almanack, "an exceptional boy cricketer who met with astonishing success as a bowler and is a fine batsman too". Askham appeared in five first-class matches as a right arm fast medium bowler who was a righthanded batsman. He took two wickets with a best performance of two for 68 and scored 83 runs with a highest score of 28 not out.

Askham joined the Suffolk Regiment in October 1915 instead of taking up a scholarship at Cambridge University. He was commissioned as a second lieutenant in the 9th Battalion, and was sent to the Western Front in 1916 where he was involved in the Battle of the Somme. On 21 August, he was in action near Mailly-Maillet in the Albert sector and was killed while leading his men in a frontal attack on the German lines. Aged just 19, he was the youngest first-class cricketer to be killed in the war.

== Sources ==
- Andrew Radd, 100 Greats – Northamptonshire County Cricket Club, Tempus, 2001
