= Eric Dixon (cricketer) =

English cricketer (1915–1941)

Eric John Hopkins Dixon (1915–1941) was an English cricketer who played for Oxford University and Northamptonshire between 1936 and 1939. He was born in Horbury, Yorkshire, on 22 September 1915, educated at St Edward's School, Oxford, and Christ Church, Oxford, and died 20 April 1941 on active service in World War II when flying from HMS Formidable off the coast of Tripoli, Libya. He received a posthumous mention in despatches. He appeared in 49 first-class cricket matches as a right-handed batsman who scored 2,356 runs with a highest score of 123, one of two centuries.
