= Charles Buller (cricketer, born 1892) =

English cricketer

Charles Edward Buller (23 August 1892 – 16 December 1969) was an English cricketer who played for Northamptonshire. He was born in Wellingborough and died in Northampton.

Buller made a single first-class appearance, during the 1931 season, against Essex. Coming in at 11, he scored one run each in the first and second innings in which he batted, and then took no wickets off 11 overs. Northamptonshire lost the match by 105 runs and Buller never played for Northamptonshire again.
