= Thomas Pitt (cricketer) =

English cricketer

Thomas Alfred Pitt was an English cricketer active from 1932 to 1935 who played for Northamptonshire (Northants). He was born in Hardingstone, Northamptonshire on 19 September 1892 and died in Northampton on 22 April 1957. Pitt appeared in 25 first-class matches as a righthanded batsman who bowled right arm medium pace. He scored 207 runs with a highest score of 31 not out and took 43 wickets with a best performance of four for 65.
