= Charles Tyler (cricketer) =

English cricketer

Charles Herbert Tyler was an English cricketer who played for Northamptonshire between 1910 and 1923 and was the club captain in the 1922 season. He was born in Northampton on 13 September 1887 and died in Blackpool on 17 May 1942. He appeared in 27 first-class matches as a right-handed batsman and scored 582 runs with a highest score of 63, one of two half-centuries.
