= Eric Herbert =

English cricketer (1908–1963)

Eric James Herbert (1908–1963) was an English cricketer active from 1937 to 1939 who played for Northamptonshire (Northants). He was born in Higham Ferrers, Northamptonshire on 12 August 1908 and died in Wellingborough on 14 October 1963. He appeared in 35 first-class matches as a righthanded batsman who bowled right arm medium pace. He scored 291 runs with a highest score of 20 and took 69 wickets with a best performance of five for 103.
