= Harold Snell (cricketer) =

English cricketer

Harold Saxon Snell (6 December 1876 – 9 July 1942) was an English cricketer active from 1897 to 1913 who played for Northamptonshire (Northants). He was born in Highworth, Wiltshire and died in Daventry. He appeared in three first-class matches as a righthanded batsman who scored 119 runs with a highest score of 52.
