= Arthur Cox (English cricketer) =

English cricketer

Arthur Leonard Cox (22 July 1907 – 13 November 1986) was an English cricketer active from 1926 to 1947 who played for Northamptonshire. He appeared in 230 first-class matches as a right arm leg break bowler who was a righthanded batsman. Cox was born in Abington, Northamptonshire on 22 July 1907 and died in Northampton on 13 November 1986. He took 199 first-class wickets with a best performance of seven for 91 and he scored 6,631 runs with a highest score of 104, his only century though he made 31 half-centuries.
