= Edmund Crosse (cricketer) =

English cricketer

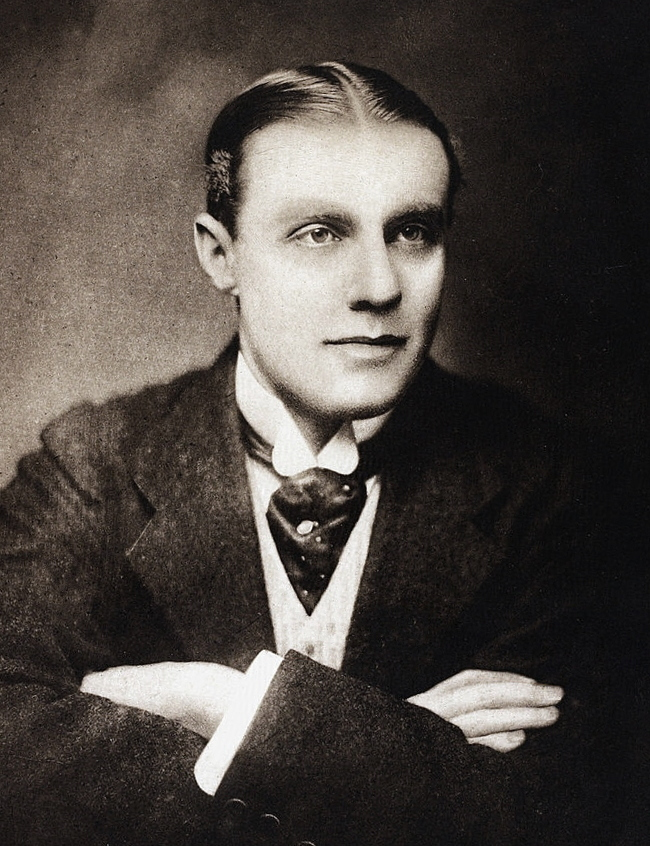

Personal information
- Full name: Edmund Mitchell Crosse
- Born: 11 December 1882; Camberwell, London, England
- Died: 28 June 1963 (aged 80); Putney, London, England
- Batting: Right-handed

Domestic team information
- Years: Team
- 1903–1910: Northamptonshire

Career statistics
Competition	First-class
Matches	48
Runs scored	1,168
Batting average	13.58
100s/50s	0/3
Top score	65
Catches/stumpings	16/–
- Source: CricInfo, 26 April 2023

Edmund Mitchell Crosse (11 December 1882 – 28 June 1963) was an English cricketer who played for Northamptonshire from 1903 to 1910 and was club captain in 1907. He appeared in 48 first-class matches after Northamptonshire was raised to first-class status from 1905 as a right-handed batsman. He scored 1,168 runs with a highest score of 65.
