= 1920 County Championship =

English cricket tournament

- Cricket format: First-class cricket
- Tournament format: League system
- Champions: Middlesex (2nd title)
- Participants: 16

The 1920 County Championship was the 27th officially organised running of the County Championship. Middlesex County Cricket Club won their second championship title.

The method used in the table reverted to that of 1914 except that in drawn matches, two points were awarded for the first innings winners and no points to the first innings losers. The match between Derbyshire and Nottinghamshire was abandoned without a ball being bowled and is included in the NR column.

== Table ==
- Five points were awarded for a win.
- Two points were awarded for "winning" the first innings of a drawn match.
- Final placings were decided by calculating the percentage of possible points.

County Championship table
| Team | Pld | W | L | DWF | DLF | NR | Pts | %PC |
|---|---|---|---|---|---|---|---|---|
| Middlesex | 20 | 15 | 2 | 1 | 2 | 0 | 77 | 77.00 |
| Lancashire | 28 | 19 | 5 | 1 | 1 | 2 | 97 | 74.61 |
| Surrey | 24 | 15 | 6 | 2 | 0 | 1 | 79 | 68.69 |
| Yorkshire | 28 | 15 | 6 | 3 | 0 | 4 | 81 | 67.50 |
| Kent | 26 | 16 | 6 | 1 | 2 | 1 | 82 | 65.50 |
| Sussex | 30 | 18 | 8 | 0 | 2 | 2 | 90 | 64.28 |
| Nottinghamshire | 20 | 10 | 6 | 2 | 0 | 2 | 54 | 60.00 |
| Gloucestershire | 20 | 8 | 9 | 0 | 0 | 3 | 40 | 47.05 |
| Essex | 24 | 9 | 9 | 0 | 4 | 2 | 45 | 40.90 |
| Somerset | 20 | 7 | 10 | 2 | 1 | 0 | 39 | 39.00 |
| Hampshire | 26 | 7 | 14 | 3 | 1 | 1 | 41 | 32.80 |
| Warwickshire | 26 | 7 | 13 | 2 | 2 | 2 | 39 | 32.50 |
| Leicestershire | 24 | 7 | 14 | 0 | 1 | 2 | 35 | 31.81 |
| Northamptonshire | 20 | 3 | 16 | 0 | 1 | 0 | 15 | 15.00 |
| Worcestershire | 18 | 1 | 16 | 0 | 0 | 1 | 5 | 5.88 |
| Derbyshire | 18 | 0 | 17 | 0 | 0 | 1 | 0 | 0.00 |
