= Thomas Manning (cricketer) =

English cricketer

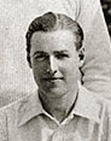

Personal information
- Full name: Thomas Edgar Manning
- Born: 2 September 1884; Northampton, England
- Died: 22 November 1975 (aged 91); Dallington, Northamptonshire, England
- Batting: Right-handed

Domestic team information
- Years: Team
- 1906 to 1922: Northamptonshire

Career statistics
Competition	First-class
Matches	53
Runs scored	1026
Batting average	13.15
100s/50s	0/3
Top score	57
Balls bowled	–
Wickets	–
Bowling average	–
5 wickets in innings	–
10 wickets in match	–
Best bowling	–
Catches/stumpings	29/3
- Source: Cricinfo, 22 February 2018

Thomas Edgar Manning (2 September 1884 – 22 November 1975) was an English cricketer who played first-class cricket for Northamptonshire from 1906 to 1922, captaining the team from 1908 to 1910.

Manning appeared in 53 first-class matches as right-handed batsman and occasional wicketkeeper. He scored 1,026 runs with a highest score of 57 and claimed 32 victims including three stumpings.

He was president of the county club from 1948 to 1955.
