= 1921 County Championship =

English cricket tournament

- Cricket format: First-class cricket
- Tournament format: League system
- Champions: Middlesex (3rd title)
- Participants: 17

The 1921 County Championship was the 28th officially organised running of the County Championship. Middlesex County Cricket Club won their third championship title.

Glamorgan County Cricket Club joined the championship for the first time.

== Table ==
- Five points were awarded for a win.
- Two points were awarded for "winning" the first innings of a drawn match.
- Final placings were decided by calculating the percentage of possible points.

County Championship table
Team	Pld	W	L	DWF	DLF	NR	Pts	%PC
Middlesex	20	15	2	0	2	1	75	78.94
Surrey	24	15	2	3	3	1	81	70.43
Yorkshire	26	16	3	4	2	1	88	70.40
Kent	26	16	7	2	1	0	84	64.61
Lancashire	28	15	4	4	3	2	83	63.84
Hampshire	28	14	9	4	1	0	78	55.71
Gloucestershire	24	12	12	0	0	0	60	50.00
Nottinghamshire	24	10	8	3	2	1	56	48.69
Sussex	28	13	12	1	2	0	67	47.85
Somerset	22	8	11	2	1	0	44	40.00
Leicestershire	26	10	14	0	2	0	50	38.46
Derbyshire	20	5	12	3	0	0	31	31.00
Northamptonshire	24	5	15	1	2	1	27	23.47
Worcestershire	22	5	15	0	2	0	25	22.72
Essex	26	5	13	2	6	0	29	22.30
Warwickshire	26	5	18	1	2	0	27	20.76
Glamorgan	18	2	14	1	0	1	12	14.11
