= Dallington, Northamptonshire =

Dallington
- Suburb of Northampton
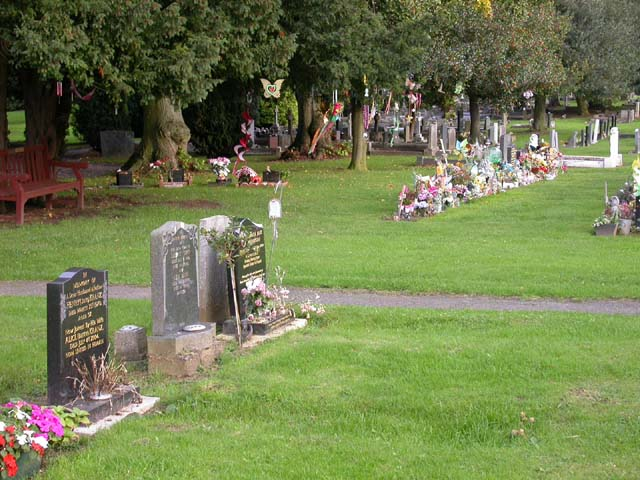
- Dallington Cemetery

- Map showing location of Dallington
- Coordinates: 52°14′38.64″N 0°55′22.49″W
- Sovereign state: United Kingdom
- Country: England
- County: Northamptonshire
- District: West Northamptonshire
- Civil parish: Northampton

Area
  - Total: 0.039 sq mi (0.1 km^{2})
- Elevation: 256 ft (78 m)

Dallington is an area about 1.5 miles (2.4 km) northwest of the centre of Northampton, in the West Northamptonshire district, in the ceremonial county of Northamptonshire, England. Dallington was formerly a separate village. At the 2011 census the population was listed in the Spencer ward of Northampton Council.

The villages name means 'farm/settlement connected with Daegel'.

Parish church The Church of England parish Church of Saint Mary the Virgin dates from 1207 and is a Grade II* listed building. It is near the site of a previous Saxon church.

When Bishop of Peterborough, William Connor Magee circulated questions to the clergy of the Rural Deanery of Northampton in preparation for formal visitations held in the years 1872, 1875, 1878, 1882 and 1888. These and the answers provided have been published, including a detailed introduction describing the condition of the area at that time and associated issues. Dallington is one of the parishes included.

Dallington Hall on Dallington Park Road is a Grade II* listed house built in 1720-30 for Sir Joseph Jekyll, Master of the Rolls in place of the original manor house owned by the Rainsford family (see Richard Raynsford). It was later owned by Earl Spencer before becoming a hospital known as the Margaret Spencer Home of Rest. It has now been divided into private apartments.

There was a short lived attempt to quarry iron ore in the parish in the early 1860s. The quarry ceased operation by 1863. It was on the west side of the railway to the north of Northampton Station and the site is now built over or covered by railway sidings. It had a horse -worked tramway to take the ore to the railway.

Dallington is north-east of Duston, south of Kings Heath and north-west of St James End.

== Civil parish ==
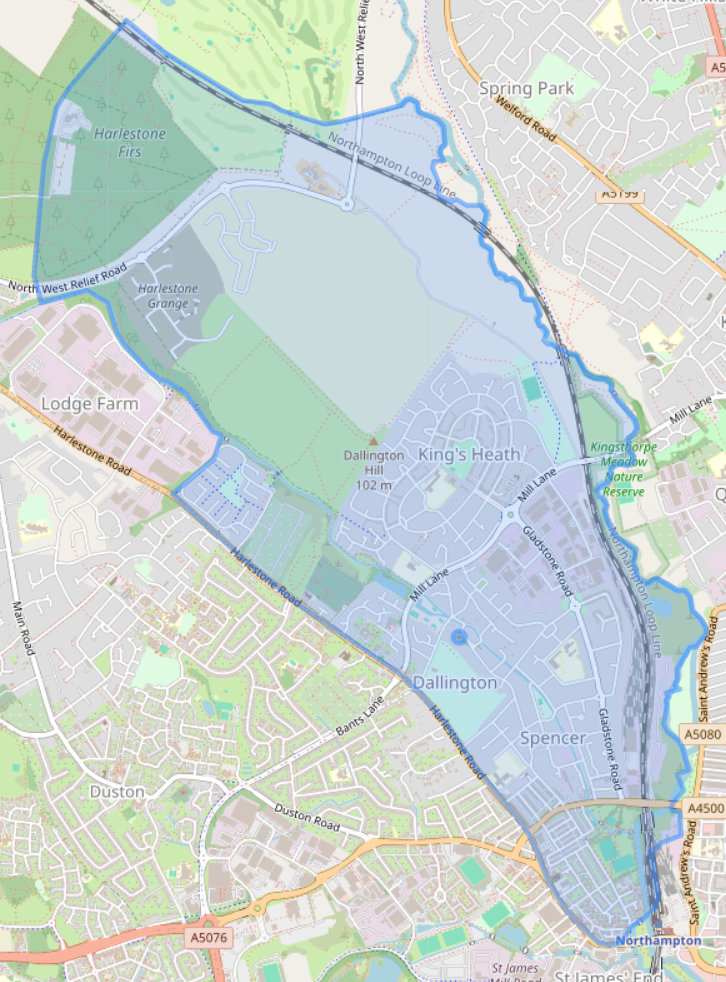
Dallington ancient parish boundaries (the blue circle marks the location of St Mary's church)

On 1 April 1932 the parish was abolished and merged with Northampton and Duston. In 1931 the parish had a population of 360.
