= Milligan (surname) =

Milligan is a surname of Scottish and Irish origin, coming from the Irish Ó Maolagáin, literally meaning 'grandson of the bald man'. Notable people with the surname include:

== People ==
=== A–H ===
- Alexander William Milligan (1858–1921), Australian ornithologist
- Alice Milligan (1865–1953), Irish nationalist and poet
- Andy Milligan (1929–1991), American playwright, screenwriter, and film director
- Barry Milligan (fl. 2020s), American politician from Louisiana
- Billy Milligan (1955–2014), noted sufferer of multiple personality disorder
- Blanche Margaret Milligan (fl. early 20th century), American author
- Bob Milligan (born 1932), American politician from Florida
- Bonnie Milligan, musical theater performer and television actor
- Brent Milligan, American record producer and bass guitar player
- Catherine Jean Milligan (born 1986), 2006 Miss Northern Ireland
- Chic Milligan (Charles Campbell Milligan; 1930–2020), Scottish footballer
- Chris Milligan (born 1988), Australian actor
- Clarence Milligan (1904–1993), Canadian politician, member of the House of Commons of Canada (1957–1962)
- Cynthia H. Milligan (born 1947), American businesswoman
- Deanna Milligan (born 1972), Canadian actress
- Dennis Milligan (born 1957), State Treasurer of Arkansas (from 2015)
- Dolphus E. Milligan (1928–1973), American chemist
- Dudley Milligan (1916–1971), South African and Irish footballer
- Dustin Milligan (born 1985), Canadian film and television actor
- Edward H. Milligan (1922–2020), Quaker historian
- Eric Milligan (politician) (fl. 1990s and 2000s), Scottish politician
- Eric Milligan (rugby union) (born 1981), Scottish rugby union player
- Frank Milligan (1870–1900), English cricketer
- Fraser Milligan (born 1989), Scottish footballer
- George Milligan (disambiguation)
- Gladys Milligan (1892–1973), American painter
- Hamin Milligan (born 1978), Arena Football League player
- Hanik Milligan (born 1979), American football player
- Harold Vincent Milligan (1888–1951), Stephen Foster biographer and composer
- Helen Milligan (born 1962), Scottish-New Zealand chess player
- Henry Milligan (born 1958), American boxer

=== J–Z ===
- Jacob L. Milligan (1889–1951), United States Representative from Missouri (1920–1921, 1923–1935)
- James Milligan (politician) (born 1978), Australian politician
- James Milligan (singer) (1928–1961), Canadian singer
- Jamie Milligan (born 1980), English footballer
- Jocko Milligan, born John Milligan (1861–1923), Major League Baseball player
- John Milligan (disambiguation)
- Joseph Milligan (born 1980), member of American alternative rock band Anberlin
- Keith Milligan (born 1950), Prince Edward Island politician
- Kelly Milligan (born 1961), American Olympic cross-country skier
- Lambdin P. Milligan (1812–1899) Lawyer and Confederate sympathizer
- Louise Milligan, Australian journalist
- Luke Milligan (born 1976), a former tennis player from the United Kingdom
- Malford Milligan (born 1959), American soul, blues and gospel singer
- Mark Milligan (born 1985), Australian footballer
- Maurice M. Milligan (1884–1959), U.S. District Attorney for Western Missouri
- Mike Milligan (disambiguation)
- Paddy Milligan (Samuel Risk Milligan; 1916–2001), Irish greyhound trainer
- Peter Milligan (born 1961), graphic novelist
- Randy Milligan (born 1961), a former professional baseball player
- Rob Milligan (politician) (born 1971), Canadian politician
- Rob Milligan (rugby union) (born 1990), British rugby union player
- Robert Milligan (footballer) (1892–1915), Scottish footballer
- Robert Milligan (merchant) (1746–1809), Scottish merchant and ship-owner
- Robert Milligan (politician) (1786–1862), English politician
- Rolan Milligan (born 1994), American football safety
- Samuel Milligan (1814–1874), American attorney
- Spencer Milligan (fl. 1970s and 1980s), American actor
- Spike Milligan (1918–2002), comedian, writer and actor
- Stephen Milligan (1948–1994), British politician
- Stuart Milligan (born 1953), American actor
- Tommy Milligan (1904–1970), Scottish welter/middleweight boxer of the 1920s
- Tony Milligan (born 1966), Scottish philosopher
- William Milligan (disambiguation)

== Fictional characters ==
- Adam Milligan, a minor character in the show Supernatural
- Bruno Milligan, a character in the television series Footballers' Wives
- Lori Milligan, a character in the film The Final Destination
- Lucy Milligan, a character in the television series Footballers' Wives
- Owen Milligan, a character in the Degrassi series
- Rex Milligan, a fictional character created by Anthony Buckeridge

== See also ==
- Mulligan (surname)
