= List of Old Wellingburians =

Wellingborough School is a co-educational day independent school in the market town of Wellingborough in Northamptonshire. It was established in 1595 and is one of the oldest schools in the country. Well known alumni include:

== A ==
- Anna Turney

== B ==
- Eric Barwell, flying ace of the Second World War

== C ==
- Richard Coles
- Will Chudley
- James Claydon

== D ==
- Dickie Dodds
- James Dyson

== E ==
- Michael Ellis (British politician)

== G ==
- W Stephen Gilbert (television dramatist, critic)
- David Gillett
- Sir William Gilliatt
- Christopher Greenwood

== H ==
- Nick Haste, first-class cricketer
- Wyndham Hazelton
- Arthur Henfrey
- Peter Hudson (British Army officer)
- Maxwell Hutchinson

== J ==
- Peter Stanley James

== L ==
- Andrew Lauder (music executive)
- Roger Levitt - disgraced financial adviser, who was banned from the financial services industry for life in 1994.

== M ==
- Colin McAlpin
- Philip Meeson, Executive Chairman of Dart Group
- Rob Milligan
- Alison Mitchell

== N ==
- Robert Edwin Newbery

== O ==
- Andrew Loog Oldham

== P ==
- Anne Panter
- Richard Peck, British Army major-general and first-class cricketer

== R ==
- Dan Roan (journalist)

== S ==
- Sirajuddin of Perlis
- Dennis Stokes (cricketer)

== T ==
- James Brian Tait
- George Thompson (cricketer)

== V ==
- Bernard Vann

== W ==
- Alex Waller
- Ethan Waller
- Ray Whitney (politician)
- David Wilson-Johnson
- Henry Winslow Woollett
- Ronald Wright (cricketer)

== Y ==
- Hamza Yassin
