= Mulligan =

Mulligan(s) may refer to:

== Arts and entertainment ==
- Buck Mulligan, a fictional character in James Joyce's novel Ulysses
- Mulligan (games), a second chance given to a player to perform a certain move or action
- Mulligan (TV series), an animated sitcom
- Mulligans (film), a 2008 movie
- The Mulligan, a 2022 film starring Pat Boone

== People ==
- Mulligan (surname), a list of people

== Places ==
- Mulligan, Newfoundland and Labrador, Canada, a settlement
- Mulligan Family Fun Center, an amusement park in Murrieta, California
- Mulligan Peak, Victoria Land, Antarctica
- Mulligan River, Queensland, Australia
- Mulligan Township, Brown County, Minnesota, United States

== Other uses ==
- Mulligan, a racehorse that competed in the 1849 Grand National Steeplechase
- Mulligan Highway, a state highway in Queensland, Australia
- Mulligan's, a pub in Dublin, Ireland

== See also ==
- Hey Mulligan, alternative title of The Mickey Rooney Show, an American TV sitcom, 1954-55
- Hot Mulligan, an American emo band
- Milligan (disambiguation)
- Mister Mulligan, the nickname of aviator Ben Howard's Howard DGA-6 plane
- Mr Mulligan (horse), a Thoroughbred racehorse
- Mulligan Stew (disambiguation)
