= Alan Wright (cricketer) =

English cricketer

Personal information
- Full name: Alan Jack Barton Wright
- Born: 3 March 1905; Semilong, Northamptonshire, England
- Died: 29 July 1989 (aged 84); Catford, London, England
- Batting: Right-handed
- Relatives: Ronald Wright (brother)

Domestic team information
- Years: Team
- 1922–1923: Northamptonshire

Career statistics
Competition	First-class
Matches	2
Runs scored	4
Batting average	1.00
100s/50s	–/–
Top score	3
Balls bowled	–
Wickets	–
Bowling average	–
5 wickets in innings	–
10 wickets in match	–
Best bowling	–
Catches/stumpings	–/–
- Source: Cricinfo, 19 November 2011

Alan Jack Barton Wright (3 March 1905 – 29 July 1989) was an English cricketer. Wright was a right-handed batsman. He was born at Semilong, Northamptonshire.

Wright made two first-class appearances for Northamptonshire against Yorkshire in the 1922 County Championship and Nottinghamshire in the 1923 County Championship. In the match against Yorkshire at the County Ground, Northampton, Wright scored a single run Northamptonshire's first-innings, before being dismissed by George Macaulay. In their second-innings he was dismissed for a duck by Wilfred Rhodes. Yorkshire won the match by ten wickets. In the match against Nottinghamshire at Trent Bridge, he was dismissed for a duck in Northamptonshire's first-innings by Frank Matthews, while in their second-innings he scored 3 runs, before being dismissed by the same bowler.

He died at Catford, London on 29 July 1989. His brother, Ronald Wright, also played first-class cricket for Northamptonshire.
