= Marilyn E. Jacox =

American physicist (1929-2013)

- President Nixon presents the Federal Woman's Award to Jacox in the Oval Office on March 7, 1973
- Born: Marilyn Esther Jacox; April 26, 1929; Utica, New York, U.S.
- Died: October 30, 2013 (aged 84)
- Occupations: Physical chemist, physicist
- Awards: E. Bright Wilson Award in Spectroscopy, 2003; Ellis R. Lippincott Award; Federal Woman's Award; George C. Pimentel Award; Samuel Wesley Stratton Award; U. S. Department of Commerce Gold Medal Award; Utica College Outstanding Alumnus Award; Washington Academy of Sciences Award; WISE Lifetime Achievement Award

Marilyn Esther Jacox (April 26, 1929 – October 30, 2013) was an American physical chemist. She was a National Institute of Standards and Technology (NIST) Fellow and Scientist Emeritus in the Sensor Science Division.

== Education ==
Jacox was born in Utica, New York, the daughter of Grant and Mary Jacox.

Jacox graduated summa cum laude with a degree in chemistry in 1951 from Syracuse University, having attended the Utica campus, now Utica University. She received a Ph.D. degree in physical chemistry from Cornell University in September 1956, under the guidance of Prof. Simon H. Bauer. Jacox spent the next two years as postdoctoral research fellow in the chemistry department of the University of North Carolina in Chapel Hill, working with Prof. Oscar K. Rice.

== Career ==
Following her postdoctoral work at University of North Carolina, Jacox became a Fellow in Solid State Spectroscopy at the Mellon Institute, where she began working on the spectroscopy of free radicals and other unstable chemical species trapped in chemically inert cryogenic matrices, an area that was to dominate her scientific work for the rest of her life. The first 15 years of this work was done in collaboration with Dolphus E. Milligan, first at the Mellon Institute and, after 1963, at the National Bureau of Standards (later to be renamed National Institute of Standards and Technology). In the late 1950s, Jacox applied for positions at 75 universities, but only all-women's universities were interested. The NBS, however, was open to women (and people of color), leading women like Jacox and Anneke Levelt Sengers to do their research there.

The Milligan-Jacox scientific collaboration only ended upon the death of Milligan in 1973. People noted that Jacox was scientifically active and highly productive up until her death.

Jacox received an Utica College Outstanding Alumnus Award in 1963 and five years later was awarded the Washington Academy of Sciences Award in Physical Sciences. In 1970 she was awarded a U.S. Department of Commerce Gold Medal Award for her distinguished service. In 1973 she received the Federal Woman's Award from President Richard Nixon and the Samuel Wesley Stratton Award which she got from National Bureau of Standards.

She was a member of the Inter−American Photochemical Society from 1978-79 on the Executive Committee level, and was an Election Committee member by 1980. In 1987 she received the 40 Alumni of Achievement Award from Utica College. She was a member of Sigma Xi as President Elect from 1987−88, and as President from 1988-89. The same year she was awarded Ellis R. Lippincott Award by The Optical Society for her "seminal contributions in matrix-isolation spectroscopy research". In 2003, she was awarded the E. Bright Wilson Award in Spectroscopy by American Chemical Society. In the same year, she was awarded the first George C. Pimentel Award for her Advances in Matrix Isolation Spectroscopy.

Jacox was a Fellow of both the American Association for the Advancement of Science and the American Physical Society. She was a reviewer for Chemical Intermediates from 1984−89, and for Journal of Chemical Physics from 1989–91. In 2007 she received another award and again from the Washington Academy of Sciences, for Distinguished Career in Science.

An extensive interview with Jacox, recorded in 1998, is available in the NIST Digital Archives.

== Personal life ==
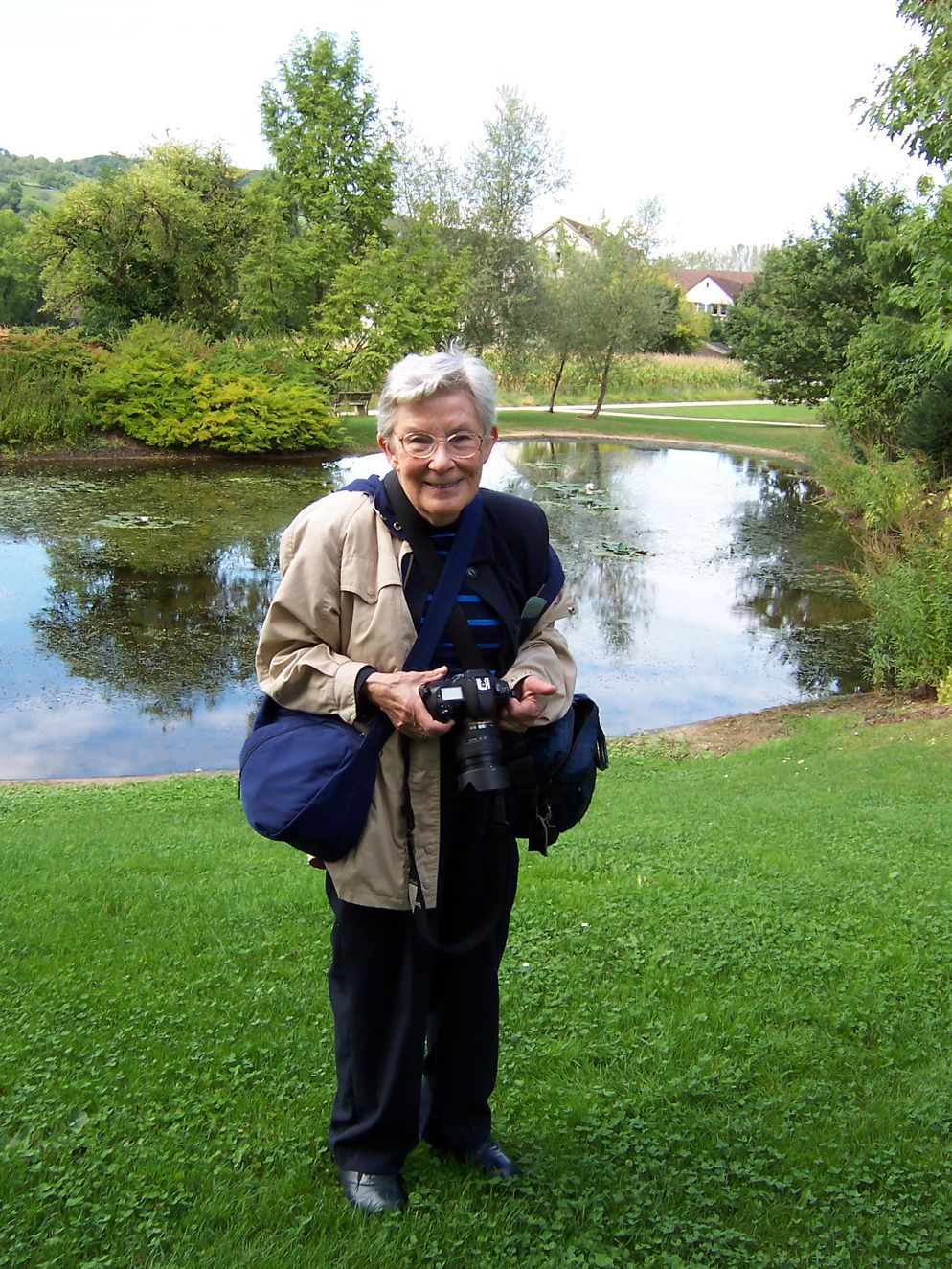
Marilyn E. Jacox with her camera at the Fondation Beyeler in Basel, Switzerland

Marilyn E. Jacox researched and published the genealogy of her ancestors throughout her life, as well as being an ardent world traveller and photographer along the way. Friends and family were regularly treated to slide and video shows created by her. Otherwise, she kept herself busy attending photography, piano, and book clubs.

== Death ==
Jacox died, after a brief illness, on October 30, 2013, aged 84. She lived in Montgomery Village, Maryland.

== Legacy ==
Owing to the discrimination she experienced during her career, Jacox left $1.5 million to Cornell University's college of arts and sciences to provide scholarships for female undergraduate students majoring in science and math fields.
