= Ronald Wright (cricketer) =

English cricketer

Personal information
- Full name: Ronald Charles Barton Wright
- Born: 13 March 1903; Semilong, Northamptonshire, England
- Died: 3 July 1992 (aged 89); Northampton, Northamptonshire, England
- Batting: Left-handed
- Bowling: Slow left-arm orthodox
- Role: Occasional wicket-keeper
- Relatives: Alan Wright (brother)

Domestic team information
- Years: Team
- 1923–1931: Northamptonshire

Career statistics
| Competition | First-class |
|---|---|
| Matches | 10 |
| Runs scored | 160 |
| Batting average | 10.00 |
| 100s/50s | –/1 |
| Top score | 56* |
| Balls bowled | 4 |
| Wickets | – |
| Bowling average | – |
| 5 wickets in innings | – |
| 10 wickets in match | – |
| Best bowling | – |
| Catches/stumpings | 4/– |
- Source: Cricinfo, 21 November 2011

Ronald Charles Barton Wright (13 March 1903 – 3 July 1992) was an English cricketer. Wright was a left-handed batsman who bowled slow left-arm orthodox and who occasionally fielded as a wicket-keeper. He was born at Semilong, Northamptonshire and educated in the county at Wellingborough School.

Wright made his first-class debut for Northamptonshire against Glamorgan in the 1923 County Championship. He next appeared for Northamptonshire in the 1930 County Championship against Worcestershire. He went on to make eight further first-class appearances for the county, the last of which came against Worcestershire in the 1931 County Championship. In his total of ten first-class appearances, he scored 160 runs at an average of 10.00, with a high score of 56 not out. This score was his only first-class fifty and came against Somerset in 1930.

He died at Northampton, Northamptonshire on 3 July 1992. His brother, Alan Wright, also played first-class cricket for Northamptonshire.
