= Rob Milligan =

Rob Milligan may refer to:

- Rob Milligan (rugby union) (born 1990), rugby union player
- Rob Milligan (politician) (born 1971), politician in Ontario, Canada

== See also ==
- Robert Milligan (disambiguation)
