= Robert Milligan =

Robert Milligan may refer to:

- Bob Milligan (born 1932), United States Marine Corps general, former Florida Comptroller
- Robert Milligan (merchant) (1746–1809), Scottish slaver and merchant
- Robert Milligan (politician) (1786–1862), British Liberal MP
- Robert Milligan (footballer) (1892–1915), Scottish footballer
- Robert Milligan (rower) (born 1952), British rower

== See also ==
- Robert Milligan McLane (1815–1898), American politician and diplomat
- Rob Milligan (disambiguation)
