= Mr Mulligan =

Mr Mulligan may refer to:

- Mr Mulligan (horse), a Thoroughbred racehorse
- Howard DGA-6, an aircraft nicknamed "Mister Mulligan"

== See also ==
- Mulligan (surname)
