= George Milligan =

George Milligan may refer to:

- George Milligan (physician) (?-1799), American surgeon
- George Milligan (moderator) (1860–1934), Scottish minister of the Church of Scotland
- George Milligan (Biblical scholar) (1860–1934), professor at Glasgow University
- George Milligan (footballer) (1891–?), Scottish footballer
- George Milligan (footballer, born 1917) (1917-1983), English footballer, see List of Oldham Athletic A.F.C. players (25–99 appearances)
- George Milligan (politician) (1934–1990), American politician in the state of Iowa
