= Richard Jack =

British painter (1866–1952)

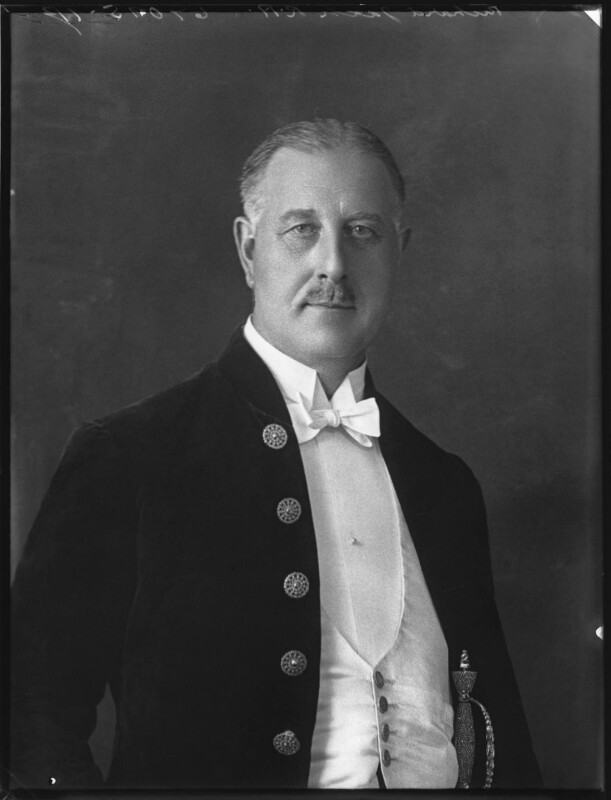
- Jack in 1926
- Born: Richard Jack; 15 February 1866; Sunderland, County Durham, United Kingdom
- Died: 30 June 1952 (aged 86); Montreal, Quebec, Canada
- Education: York School of Art, Royal College of Art, Académie Julian, Académie Colarossi
- Known for: Painting
- Movement: British Impressionism
- Awards: 1886 National Scholarship to the Royal College of Art; 1888 Royal College of Art gold medal

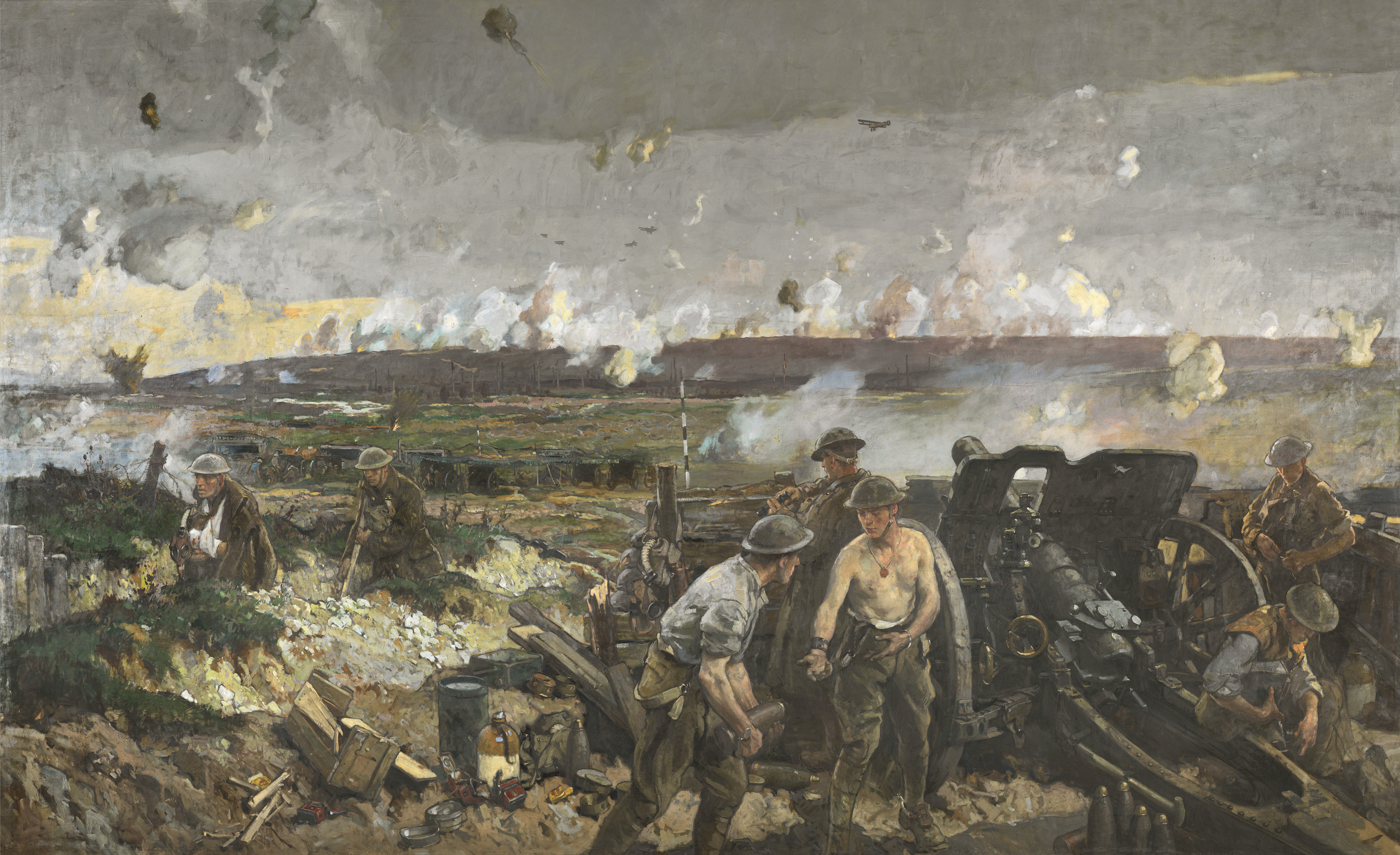
The Taking of Vimy Ridge.

Richard Jack RA RI (15 February 1866 – 30 June 1952) was a painter of portraits, figure subjects, interiors, and landscapes, and prominent war artist for Canada.

== Early life and education ==
Richard Jack was born 15 February 1866 in Sunderland, County Durham, United Kingdom.

He studied at York School of Art before winning a national scholarship to the Royal College of Art in 1886. There he won a gold medal and in 1888 a travelling scholarship to the Académie Julian.

== Career ==
On his return to London in the early 1890s, Jack worked for a time on the staff of The Idler and for Cassell's Magazine as a black-and-white artist.

He was awarded a silver medal at the 1900 Paris International Exhibition and at the Carnegie International in Pittsburgh in 1914. Jack was elected an associate of the Royal Academy of Arts in February 1914 and a full academician in 1920 and his diploma work, in the RA archives, is an oil painting of his daughter Doris and the family dog entitled On the Moors.

In 1916, he accepted a commission in the Canadian Expeditionary Force to paint for the Canadian War Records Office, becoming Canada's first official war artist. Two large paintings were commissioned by Lord Beaverbrook: The Second Battle of Ypres, 22 April to 25 May 1915, and The Taking of Vimy Ridge, Easter Monday 1917. Both paintings are on permanent display at the Canadian War Museum in Ottawa, Ontario. His large oil Return to the Front showing a crowded troop train at Victoria Station, London, hangs in York Art Gallery.

A portrait of King George V, commissioned by the Metropolitan Borough of Fulham, was later bought by the monarch himself. He subsequently painted portraits of Queen Mary, King Alfonso XIII of Spain, and various interiors at Buckingham Palace. In the 1920s Jack became fond of Canada, making several visits there with his family. After his daughter met and married the Ottawa businessman Victor Whitehead, Jack and his wife moved to Montreal. Inspired by Canadian scenery, particularly the Rockies, Jack took to landscape paintings, as well as portraits.

== Death and legacy ==
Jack died on 20 June 1952.

More than 40 his paintings hang in UK public collections, including one of composer Colin McAlpin in the collection of the Leicester Arts and Museums Service.
