= John Milligan =

John Milligan is the name of:

- John J. Milligan (1795–1875), American lawyer, judge and political figure
- John Colborne Milligan (1867–1941), Ontario lawyer, judge and political figure
- Jocko Milligan, born John Milligan (1861–1923), Major League Baseball player
- John Milligan (baseball) (1904–1972), Major League Baseball player
- John Milligan (bowls), Lawn bowler
- John F. Milligan, CEO of Gilead Sciences
- John Milligan-Whyte (born 1952), American businessman, lawyer and philosopher
