= Nick Haste =

English cricketer

Personal information
- Full name: Nicholas John Haste
- Born: 13 November 1972 (age 53); Northampton, Northamptonshire, England
- Batting: Right-handed
- Bowling: Right-arm medium

Domestic team information
- Years: Team
- 1993–1996: Cambridge University

Career statistics
Competition	First-class
Matches	32
Runs scored	372
Batting average	13.28
100s/50s	–/1
Top score	51*
Balls bowled	4,925
Wickets	49
Bowling average	60.26
5 wickets in innings	1
10 wickets in match	–
Best bowling	5/73
Catches/stumpings	9/–
- Source: Cricinfo, 10 January 2022

Nicholas John Haste (born 13 November 1972) is an English former first-class cricketer.

Haste was born at Northampton in November 1972. He was educated at Wellingborough School, before going up to Pembroke College, Cambridge. While studying at Cambridge, he played first-class cricket for Cambridge University Cricket Club between 1993 and 1996, making 32 appearances. Playing as a medium pace bowler in the Cambridge side, Haste took 49 wickets at an average of 60.26. He took one five wicket haul, with figures of 5 for 73 against Oxford University in the 1995 University Match at Lord's. His bowling action in the match was described by Norman Harris of The Independent as having a "purposeful stride and vigorous action" and that "he looked a genuinely first-class bowler". As a lower order batsman, he scored 372 runs at a batting average of 13.28 from his 32 matches; he made one half century, a score of 51 against Oxford University in 1996. After graduating from Cambridge, Haste did not proceed further in the first-class game. He did however play club cricket for Brentwood Cricket Club in Essex, and Bedford Town in the Northamptonshire Cricket League.
