= Alice MacDonell =

Scottish poet

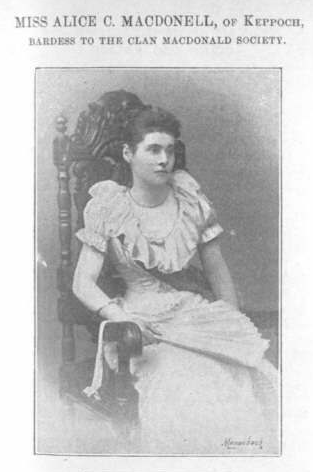
Alice MacDonell in 1893

Alice MacDonell (31 January 1854 – 12 October 1938) was a Scottish poet who claimed to be Chieftainess of the MacDonell clan of Keppoch, and was recognised as bardess to that clan.

Her full name and title was Alice Claire MacDonell of Keppoch, or in Scottish Gaelic Ailis Sorcha Ni' Mhic 'ic Raonuill na Ceapaich. She wrote verses as “Alice C. MacDonell of Keppoch”.

== Life ==
Born in 1854 at Kilmonivaig in the Scottish Highlands, Alice MacDonell was the youngest child and eighth daughter of Angus McDonnell (titled Angus XXII of Keppoch) and his wife Christina (née MacNab). Her great-great grandfather was the Keppoch who led the MacDonalds at Culloden. She was educated by private tuition, and at the Convent of French Nuns in Northampton and at St. Margaret's Convent, Edinburgh. She gave early signs of the gift of poetry, stringing together couplets on incidents she had heard, her favourites being tales of battle and chivalry. She was steeped in the Jacobite sentiment of her ancestors, composing about the heroics of the Rising, though she also included more contemporary examples such as The Highland Brigade at the Battle of the Alma, The Rush on Coomassie, and the Gordon Highlanders at Dargai Heights.

She was Bardess to the Clan MacDonald Society. Her poetry was composed in English, with occasional use of nominal Gaelic titles.

She did not marry.

In 1911, she was living with her sister Josephine in Streatham, London.

She died on 12 October 1938 in Hove, East Sussex, England.

== Works ==
An incomplete list of her works includes

=== Books of poems ===
- Lays of the heather: poems, dedicated to Prince Rupert of Bavaria, London: E. Stock (1896) from Songs of the mountain and the burn, London: J. Ouseley (1912) OCLC 881436215
- The royal ribbon, Edinburgh: T. Allan (192- ?) OCLC 4845148
- The crushing of the lilies, Edinburgh: T. Allan (1927) OCLC 4455085
- For God and St. Andrew, Edinburgh: (1928) OCLC 559904558
- The Glen o’ dreams, Edinburgh: T. Allan (1929) OCLC 4764557

=== Poems ===
- The Weaving of the Tartan poem in Celtic Monthly (1894)
- Culloden Moor (Seen in Autumn Rain)
- Lochabair gu Bràch (Lochaber for Ever) introductory poem to Loyal Lochaber and its Associations, by W. Drummond Norie. Glasgow: Morison Brothers (1898) OCLC 4349284
- The mother land poem in the year book of the MacDonald Society (1899)

=== Articles ===
- Deirdre: The Highest Type of Celtic Womanhood, from The Celtic Review Vol.8 No.32 (1913) p. 347
- Unforgotten, in The Irish Monthly Vol.56 No.656 (1 February 1928) p. 65

=== Songs ===
- The Thin Red Line (Of the Highlanders at Balaclava), monologue with piano, music by Stanley Hawley. London: Bosworth & Co., Recitation music series No.12 (1896) OCLC 29529751
- The Lad with the Bonnet of Blue from Lays of the heather, music by Colin McAlpin, London: Cary & Co. (1899) OCLC 278282743
- The Doom of Knocklea, music by Colin McAlpin, unpublished
- Our Heroe's welcome, music by Colin McAlpin (Note: Sung by Miss Jessie MacLachlan at a London banquet given to Col. Hector MacDonald.)
- Gillean an fhèilidh ("The kilted lads") from A' tarraing às an tobar: tionndaidhean ùra de dh'òrain thraidiseanta ann an Gàidhlig agus Albais, a' tarraing o na clàran aig Tobar an Dualchais ("Raisin the riches: new arrangements of traditional Gaelic and Scots songs, drawing on the Kist o Riches") Sleat, Isle of Skye: Sabhal Mòr Ostaig ("Great Barn of Ostaig" higher education college), Tobar an Dualchais (Kist o Riches Project) (2014) OCLC 932053867

== Bibliography ==
- Keith Norman MacDonald, M.D. MacDonald Bards from Mediæval Times (reprinted from the "Oban Times") Edinburgh: Norman MacLeod (1900)
- Sir Thomas Innes of Learney The Tartans of the Clans and Families of Scotland Edinburgh: W. & A.K. Johnston (1938)
