= Milligan =

Milligan may refer to:

== People ==
- Milligan (surname), a surname (including a list of people with the name)

== Places ==
- Milligan, California, an abandoned settlement in San Bernardino County
- Milligan, Florida, an unincorporated community in Okaloosa County, Florida
- Milligan, Indiana, an unincorporated community
- Milligan, Nebraska, a village
- Milligan, Ohio, an unincorporated community
- Milligan, Texas, an unincorporated community in Collin County, Texas

== Other uses ==
- Milligan College, a college near Greeneville, Tennessee
- Ex Parte Milligan, a United States Supreme Court case
- Miss Milligan, a solitaire card game
