= Colin McAlpin =

English composer and writer

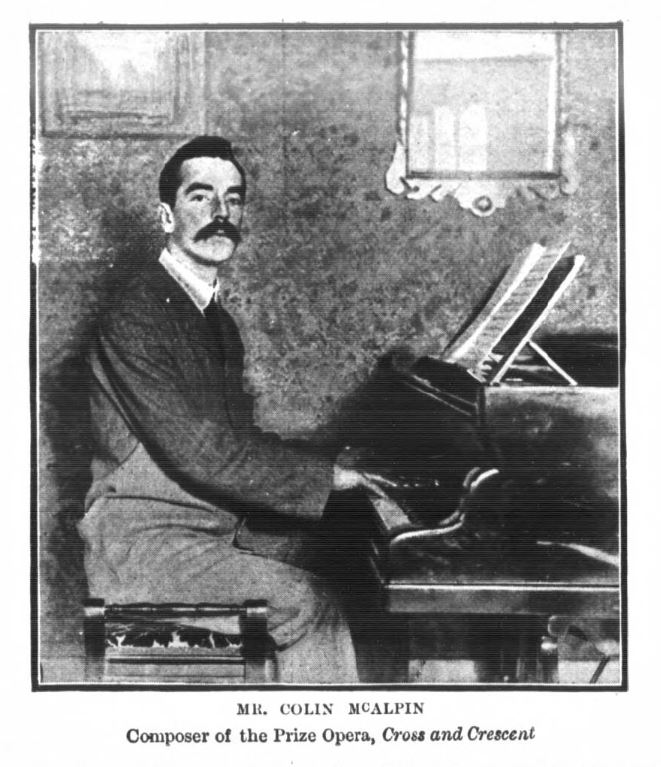
Colin McAlpin in 1903

Colin McAlpin (9 April 1870 – 13 May 1942) was an English composer of songs, operas and ballet music, an organist and a writer of critical essays on music.

== Life ==
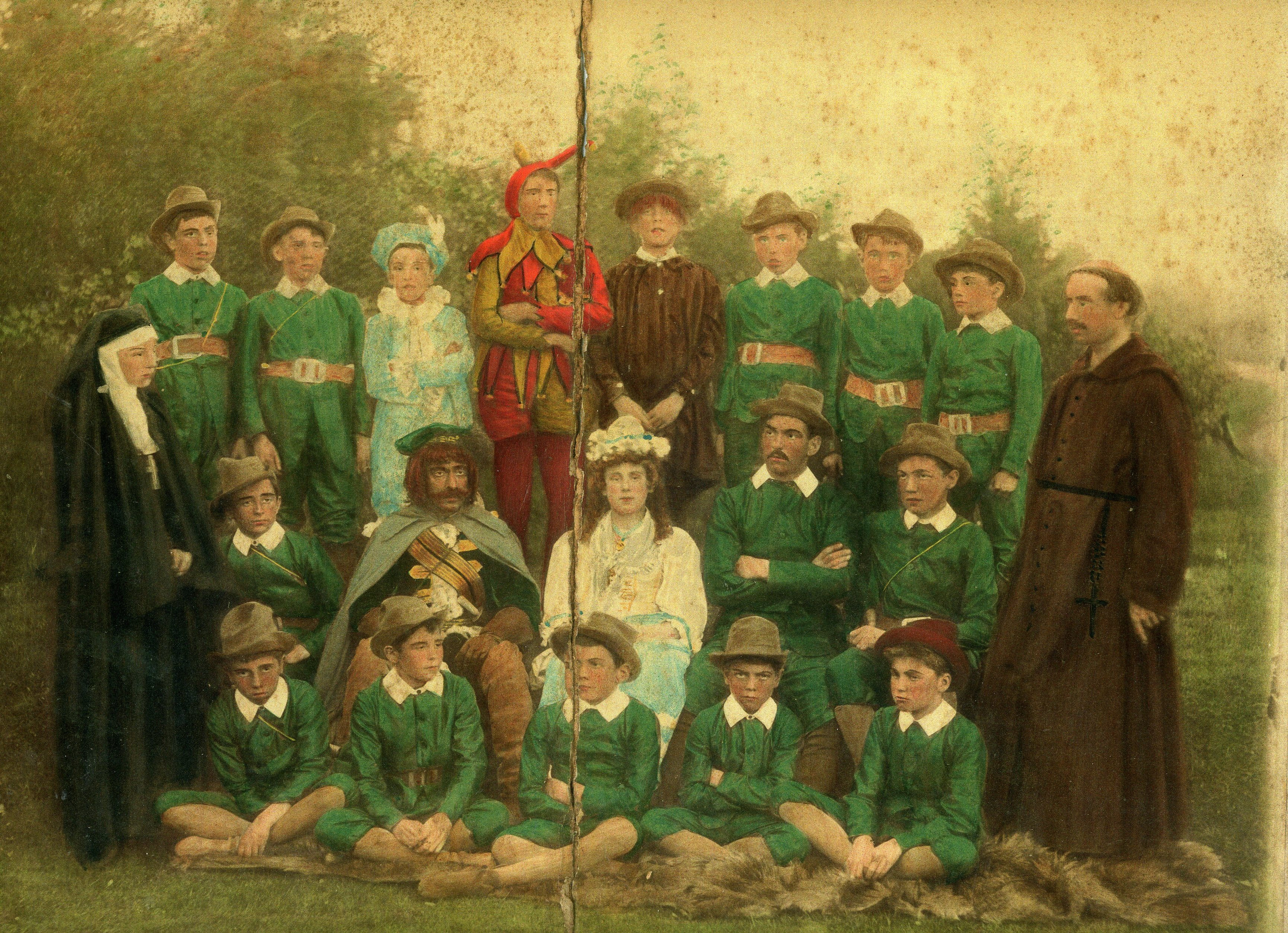
The cast of Colin McAlpin's opera Robin Hood, at Wellingborough School, 1892. The man in black standing on the right resembles McAlpin.

Colin McAlpin was born in 1870, at 15 Gallowtree Gate, Leicester, England. He was the fourth child of a clothier John William McAlpin, and his German wife Marie Louise (née Gerdes). His elder siblings were Kenneth, Donal and Janet, and his younger brothers Alan and John.

McAlpin published his first composition when he was only 15 and at Wellingborough School: a song called The Cuckoo published in the Midland Musical Journal. At the age of 16 he was admitted to the Royal Academy of Music to study harmony with Francis William Davenport and organ playing with Charles Steggall, and after three years he acquired silver medals in both areas of study. In 1892 Robin Hood, his first dramatic work, was performed at Wellingborough School and that year he was appointed organist and choirmaster at Kensington Presbyterian Church.

In 1897, King Arthur, an opera in three acts, commissioned by impresario Herbert Marshall, was performed by the Leicester Philharmonic Society under H. S. Ellis. In that year three of McAlpin's Ten Songs were performed in one of Granville Bantock's concerts for British composers: they were published by Cary & Son, the first of dozens of his pieces to be published by this company.

In 1899 McAlpin wrote the music for an Ode performed at the opening of the new buildings for Westminster College, Cambridge. It was a setting of the poem by one of the principal benefactors Agnes Smith Lewis "Spring Up. O Well!^ (kater published in her book "Margaret Atheling and other Poems") for solo voice with chorus. The soloist was Olive Milne Rae.

In his thirtieth year McAlpin was appointed organist and choirmaster of Trinity Presbyterian Church Clapham, where his sacred cantata The Prince of Peace had its first performance.

In 1903 King Arthur was performed at the Royalty Theatre, London. In the same year his opera in four acts, The Cross and the Crescent, first produced at Covent Garden by the Moody-Manners company, won him the Manners Prize of £250 for the best opera by a British composer, and it was performed subsequently in Glasgow and Edinburgh. A one-act opera The Vow staged at the Theatre Royal, Nottingham won him the same prize twelve years later.

His writings include critical essays published in journals The Musical Times and The Musical Quarterly. His book Hermaia: a Study in Comparative Esthetics, which has been described by his biographer David J. Fisher as "a remarkable study of comparative aesthetics", has been recognised as culturally important.

In 1907 McAlpin had his portrait painted by Richard Jack RA, and a bronze bust was sculpted by W. B. Fagan FRBS.

In 1920 his cantata Excalibur was performed in London. From 1920 he was organist and choirmaster of Ealing Presbyterian Church until 1935 when he also he retired from organ teaching at the London College of Music.

He married an artist Susette Peach (1871–1950) in 1899, and they had one son Roderic McAlpin (1907–1965).

Colin McAlpin died at Dorking, Surrey, on 13 May 1942.

== Compositions ==
=== Operas ===
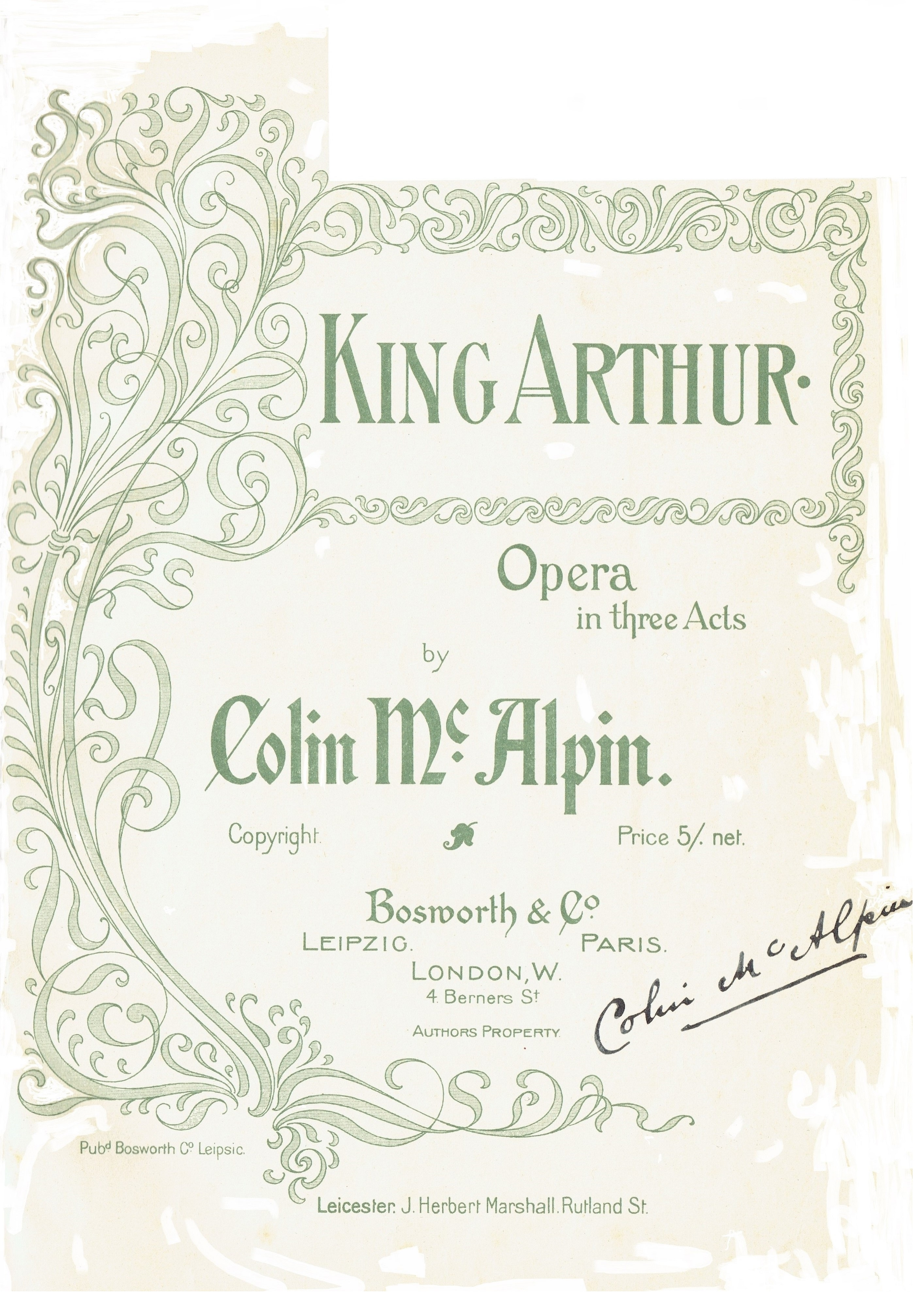
The cover of the vocal score of McAlpin's opera King Arthur, signed by the composer

- Robin Hood, an opera, written at school, about 1885
- King Arthur, an opera in three acts, with words by the composer. Leipzig and London: Bosworth & Co., 1897. Premiere: Leicester Philharmonic Choir.
- Fingal, an opera in four acts, with a cast of 9
- The Cross and the Crescent, his prize-winning opera, produced by Charles Manners and first performed in 1903. Words from John Davidson's translation of Pour la Couronne, a tragedy by François Coppée.
- The Vow, an opera in one act, libretto upon the Biblical story of Jephtha's daughter. Premiere in Nottingham, 1915, produced by Charles Manners.
- Ingomar, an opera, performed at Theatre Royal, Drury Lane in 1910.

=== Cantatas ===
- The Prince of Peace. Sacred cantata for chorus and organ, with soprano, tenor and bass soli. Cary & Co.: London First performance 17 December 1902 at Trinity Presbyterian Church, Clapham, London.
- Excalibur, in 2 Acts, for chorus SATB and orchestra. Unpublished. First performance 1920, produced by the Fairbairn Opera, at the Surrey Theatre.

=== Songs ===
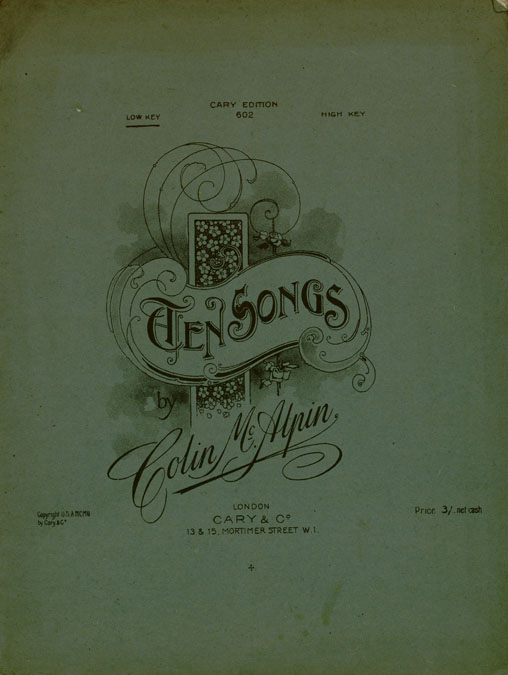
The cover of McAlpin's Ten Songs.

- Ode for the opening of Westminster College, Cambridge, 17 October 1899. For solo voice and chorus.
- The Lad with the Bonnet of Blue (Alice C. MacDonell), London: Cary & Co., 1899 OCLC 278282743
- The Doom of Knocklea (Alice C. MacDonell), unpublished
- Our Heroe's welcome (Alice C. MacDonell), unpublished
- The Penitent (John Murray), London: Weekes & Co., 1902
- Like as a Father, Sacred Song, London: J. Williams, 1903
- Mary's Song: A Song of Bethlehem (Colin McAlpin), from The Prince of Peace, London: Cary & Co., 1903
- Ten Songs, London: Cary & Co., 1903OCLC 498420435, also Whaley, Royce & Co. Winnipeg, Toronto (1905)
  - 1. The light of love (Hartley Coleridge)
  - 2. She walks in beauty (Byron)
  - 3. Elegy: Oh! snatched away in beauty's bloom (Byron)
  - 4. A faded violet (Shelley)
  - 5. Slumber song (Colin McAlpin) – "sung by Miss Ada Crossley"
  - 6. Music, when soft voices die (Shelley)
  - 7. A widow-bird (Shelley)
  - 8. Thou wouldst be loved (Edgar Allan Poe)
  - 9. A lament (Shelley) – two stanzas
  - 10. There be none of Beauty's daughters (Byron)
- Three Songs, London: Cary & Co., 1904 OCLC 278282741
  - As of Yore
  - Spring
  - A Love Song
- Love's Vigil (W.W. Robinson), London: Boosey & Co., 1917
- Kent, Ballad (J.H. Barnes, etc.), London: Francis, Day & Hunter, 1912
- The Vow, song for baritone

=== Choral Songs ===
- The Cuckoo, choral song, pub. in the Midland Musical Journal, 1885

=== Piano ===
- Three Sketches, London: Willcocks & Co., 1893
- Graceful Dance, London: Willcocks & Co., 1900
- Fantastic Dance, London: Cary & Co., 1903

=== Organ ===
- The Organist's Library of Original Pieces for Organ, Harmonium or American Organ, Book 6. London: Cary & Co., 1898
  - 1.March in D
  - 2. Prayer
  - 3. Meditation
  - 4. Pastorale
  - 5. Adagio in A
  - 6. Rêverie
  - 7. Theme in A
  - 8. Melody
  - 9. Minuet & Trio
  - 10. Andante in F
  - 11. Postlude
- Grand March, pub. in The Organist September 1902, The Lorenz Publishing Co., Dayton, Ohio
- The Organist's Library of Original Pieces for Organ, Harmonium or American Organ, Book 8. London: Cary & Co., 1903
  - 1. Processional March
  - 2. Meditation
  - 3. Rest
  - 4. Recessional March
  - 5. Melody
  - 6. Contemplation
  - 7. Festal March
  - 8. Interlude
  - 9. Pastorale
  - 10. Minuet
  - 11. Postlude

=== Orchestral ===
- Ballet, "Pluto and Persephone", unpublished ms. (1921). Performed at the Bournemouth Winter Gardens.

== Writings ==
=== Books ===
- "Hermaia: a Study in Comparative Esthetics", London: J. M. Dent & Sons, 1915. Many reprints including ISBN 9780217220460

=== Articles ===
- "Germany: Her Music" The Musical Times, Vol. 57, No. 882. (1 August 1916), pp. 363–364
- "Britain: Her Music" The Musical Times, Vol. 57, No. 884. (1 October 1916), pp. 445–447
- "Carlyle and the Opera" The Musical Times, Vol. 58, No. 888. (1 February 1917), pp. 58–60
- "The Reality of the Opera", Part I The Musical Times, Vol. 58, No. 891. (1 May 1917), pp. 201–203
- "The Reality of the Opera", Part II The Musical Times, Vol. 58, No. 892. (1 June 1917), pp. 247–249
- "Musical Criticism" The Musical Times, Vol. 58, No. 895, (1 September 1917), pp. 397–399
- "Musical Appreciation: A Plea for Catholicity" The Musical Quarterly, Vol. 6, No. 3. (July 1920), pp. 403–416, OUP.
- "On Hearing Music" The Musical Quarterly, Vol. 8, No. 3. (July 1922), pp. 419–434, OUP.
- "Is Music the Language of the Emotions?" The Musical Quarterly, Vol. 11, No. 3. (July 1925), pp. 427–443, OUP.
- "Concerning Form in Music" The Musical Quarterly, Vol 15, No. 1 (1929), pp. 55–71, OUP.
- "Musical Modernism: Some Random Reflections" The Musical Quarterly, Vol 16, No. 1 (January 1930), pp. 1–20, New York: G. Schirmer Inc.

== Bibliography ==
- Fisher, David J., Colin McAlpin: his music to 1903. Thesis (M.Mus.), University of Sheffield, Dept. of Music, 1989 OCLC 271082986
