= John F. Milligan =

- Education: University of Colorado Boulder; Ohio Wesleyan University
- Occupation: Businessman
- Title: former CEO, Gilead Sciences
- Term: 2011-2019

John F. Milligan is an American former executive who was the CEO of Gilead Sciences, a biotechnology company based in the United States from 2016 to 2019. He was previously appointed President of the company and had maintained that role since May 2008. He held various other positions during his tenure with Gilead including COO and CFO and originally joined the biotechnology company in 1990 as a research scientist. He was the 32nd employee hired by the company. Milligan became CEO when former CEO John C. Martin was appointed as Executive Chairman.

== Education ==
Milligan received his bachelor's degree from Ohio Wesleyan University and doctorate from the University of Illinois-Urbana-Champaign. He also was a postdoctoral fellow for the American Cancer Society at the University of California at San Francisco. Milligan studied for two years at the University of Colorado Boulder BioFrontiers Institute under Olke C. Uhlenbeck while earning his degree in doctoral studies.

== Career ==
Upon joining Gilead in 1990, Milligan has served multiple roles at the biotechnology company. After starting out as a research scientist, he has taken on leadership positions within the company which included Director of Project Management for the drug collaboration of Tamiflu with Hoffman-La Roche in 1996. In March 2000, he became Vice President of Corporate Development and was responsible for coordinating licensing agreements between corporate partners as well as mergers and acquisitions to expand Gilead and develop its drug pipeline. Additionally, he has been the Director of Pharmasset since January 2012 and Director of Pacific Biosciences since July 2013.

== Achievements ==
In 2006 and 2007, Institutional Investor magazine named Milligan top CFO in the biotechnology industry. Also in 2006, he was distinguished as "Bay Area Chief Financial Officer of the Year" which is awarded to leaders of companies whose annual revenues exceed $500 million. Most recently, in 2016, he was named to the Forbes Global Game Changers List which represents exceptional leaders and innovators in various industries.
