= Mulligan Stew =

Mulligan Stew may refer to:

- Mulligan stew, a hobo dinner dish
- Mulligan Stew (novel), a 1979 novel by Gilbert Sorrentino
- Mulligan Stew (TV series), a 1972 American children's educational program
- Mulligan's Stew, a 1977 American comedy-drama TV series
