= Frank Matthews (cricketer) =

English cricketer

Frank Cyril Leonard Matthews (15 August 1892 – 11 January 1961) was an English first-class cricketer active 1920–1927 who played for Nottinghamshire. He was born in Willoughby-on-the-Wolds, and died in Nottingham.
