= George Milligan (footballer) =

Scottish footballer

Personal information
- Date of birth: 1891
- Place of birth: Glasgow, Scotland
- Position: Inside forward

Senior career*
Years	Team	Apps	(Gls)
1911–1914	Burnley	2	(0)
1914–1920	Clyde		
1920–1921	Crystal Palace	2	(1)
- * Club domestic league appearances and goals

A. George Milligan (born 1891, deceased) was a Scottish professional footballer who played as an inside forward.
