= Mike Milligan =

Mike Milligan may refer to:

- Mike Milligan (footballer) (born 1967), English former footballer of Irish descent
- Mike Milligan (coach) (1904–1979), American football and basketball coach
- Mike Milligan (character), a character in The Story of Tracy Beaker, Tracy Beaker Returns and The Dumping Ground
