= William Milligan (disambiguation) =

William Milligan (1821–1892) was a Scottish theologian.

William or Billy Milligan may also refer to:

- William Lane Milligan (1795–1851), British military surgeon
- William Milligan, Lord Milligan (1898–1975), Scottish politician and judge
- Billy Milligan (1955–2014), American multiple personality
- Billy Milligan (baseball) (1878–1928), American baseball player
- ST1M (born 1986), Russian rapper also known as Billy Milligan
