= Henry Woollett =

British flying ace

- Born: 5 August 1895; Suffolk, England
- Died: 31 October 1969 (aged 74)
- Military career
- Allegiance: United Kingdom
- Branch: British Army; Royal Air Force
- Service years: 1914–1932; 1941–1942
- Rank: Squadron Leader
- Units: Lincolnshire Regiment; No. 24 Squadron RFC; No. 43 Squadron RFC/RAF; No. 8 Squadron RAF
- Commands: No. 23 Squadron RAF
- Conflicts: First World War: Gallipoli Campaign; Western Front
- Awards: Distinguished Service Order; Military Cross & Bar; Knight of the Legion of Honour (France); Croix de Guerre with Palm (France)

Henry Winslow Woollett, DSO, MC & Bar (5 August 1895 – 31 October 1969) was a British flying ace and the highest scoring British balloon busting ace credited with 35 aerial victories, including eleven balloons, during the First World War. He continued to serve in the Royal Air Force until the 1930s.

== Early life and early military career ==
Henry Winslow Woollett was born on 5 August 1895. He grew up in Southwold, Suffolk, and was educated at Wellingborough School (1907–1913). A doctor's son, he was pursuing medical studies when the First World War began. He enlisted and, on 18 November 1914, was commissioned as a second lieutenant in the infantry. He was promoted to lieutenant in the 6th Battalion, Lincolnshire Regiment on 10 December. The following year he served in the Gallipoli Campaign, taking part in the landing at Suvla Bay in August 1915. In 1916, he requested and received a transfer to the Royal Flying Corps. He qualified as a pilot after only three and a half hours flight time, and was appointed a flying officer on 27 October 1916.

== Career as a flier ==
In November 1916, Woollett was assigned to No. 24 Squadron RFC to fly the Airco DH.2. These early fighter aircraft had a rear "pusher" engine format and a forward firing machine gun with a clear field of fire making synchronisation unnecessary. It was flying one of these that Woollett claimed his first victory, on 5 April 1917, destroying an Albatros D.III. He was appointed a flight commander with the temporary rank of captain on 13 July.

No. 24 Squadron was then re-equipped with the Airco DH.5. The DH.5 was unusual in design with the top wing having a 'back stagger', behind the lower wing, to give the pilot good visibility, especially overhead. Given its lack of power (top speed was 102 miles per hour) and poor performance at higher altitudes, it was used more for ground attack than air combat. Nevertheless, it was while flying the DH.5 that Woollett destroyed three more German aircraft and drove another down 'out of control'. On 17 August 1917, he became a flying ace. He was posted back to England as a flight instructor at Eastbourne in August 1917. On 9 January 1918, he was awarded the Military Cross; a Bar in lieu of a second award would follow on 22 June.

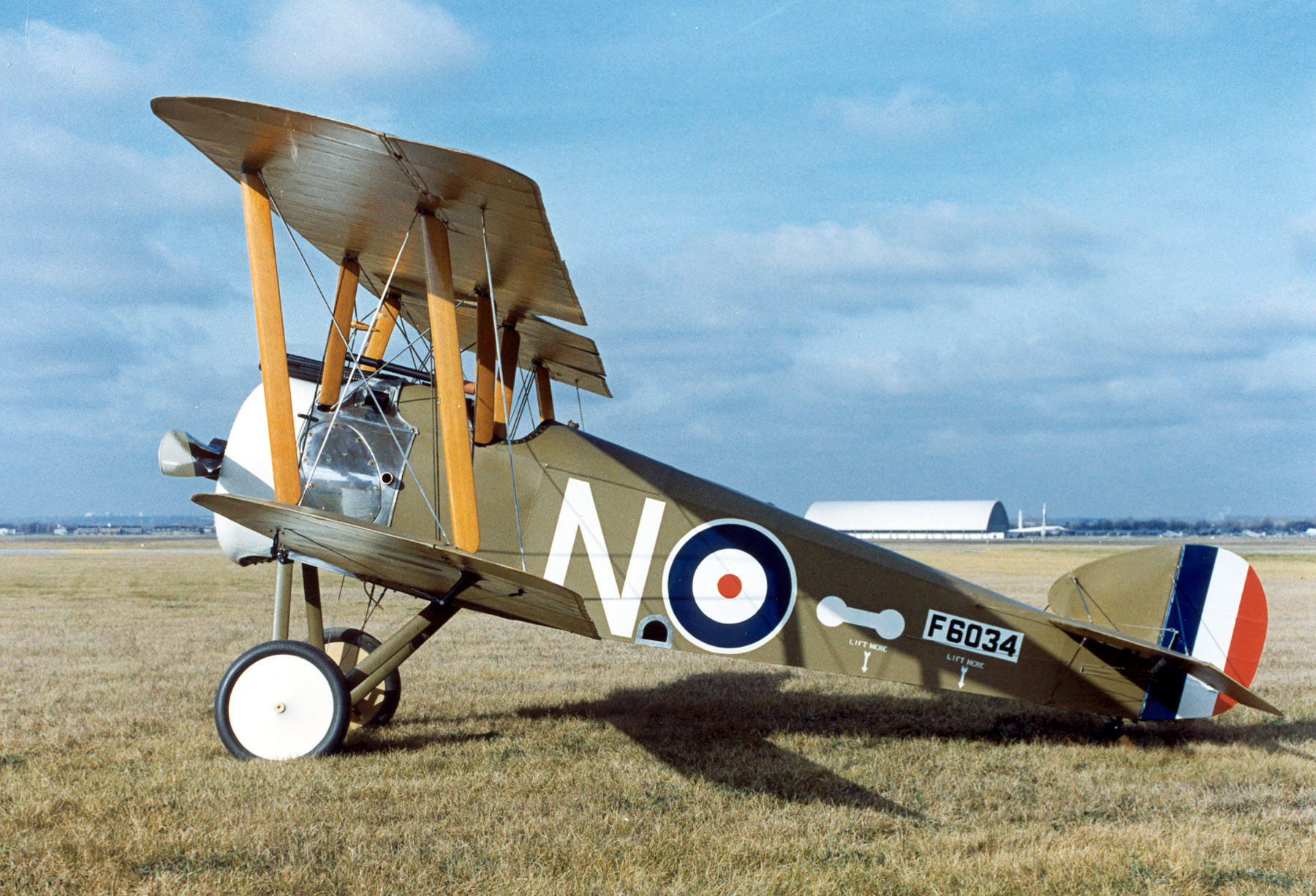
Woollett's career in fighters was spent in Camels. Number D6402 was his mainstay.

Woollett returned to combat in France in March 1918 with No. 43 Squadron, flying a Sopwith Camel. He achieved ten victories in March and was a triple ace by month's end. Beginning on 24 March, he began a series of 22 victories with Camel number D6402, making it one of the more successful airframes in the war. Victories 14 and 15 were over observation balloons, considered highly dangerous targets due to their heavy anti-aircraft protection and fighter cover.

Even in an era of relaxed garb and standards, Woollettt was colourful. He wore a leopardskin flying helmet and gauntlets when he flew. His aircraft was equally distinctive, with the propeller spinner painted as a Native American's face and a dragon trailing down the length of the fuselage. He also briefly adorned his aircraft with white 'splotches' as experimental camouflage to aid his balloon busting, but his superiors made him remove them.

Eccentric he may have been, but Woollett was also effective. April 1918 saw him claim six more German aircraft and five more balloons. He shot down six aircraft on a single day—12 April. It was an achievement rivalled by very few other pilots during the First World War and surpassed by only one, Captain John Lightfoot Trollope of No 43 Squadron RAF who destroyed seven German machines on 24 March 1918. Belgium's top ace of the First World War, Willy Coppens described Woollett's exploits:

Captain H. W. Woollett of No. 43 Squadron... whilst leading a patrol, he saw a German machine, out-manoeuvred it, fired about thirty rounds and saw it spin down and crash. During this fight he had been attacked by several other machines. Without delay he climbed rapidly above his attackers and dived on to a two-seater, firing as he went, causing this machine also to crash. Once again he out-climbed his opponents, looped away from two attacking Fokkers, made a vertical bank, and again dived on the tail of an Albatross. After he had fired about 40 rounds, this machine burst into flames and fell to pieces. He then went home. At 5 p.m. the same evening he attacked thirteen enemy aircraft... He first fired 30 rounds into one of the enemy aeroplanes, which turned over on its back and fell to pieces. He then climbed again, manoeuvred rapidly among the remaining twelve machines, avoiding the fire of his opponents until he could fire a burst into an Albatross, which spun down and crashed. He then made for home. On crossing the lines he saw another enemy machine above him. Once more the climb of his 'bus enabled him to get over his enemy, and he crashed his sixth machine for the day.

Woollett downed a balloon and two aircraft in May 1918, an enemy fighter and two balloons in July, and finished up by destroying a Fokker D.VII to end his war with 35 victories. He had scored at least 23 of his triumphs in the same Camel, serial number D6402, which he overturned and damaged on 21 July. His final wartime duty was a posting back to England to command a training wing. Woollett's account consisted of 20 enemy aircraft destroyed (including 4 shot down in flames), 4 more aircraft down 'out of control' and 11 balloons destroyed.

== Postwar career ==
On 1 August 1919 Woollett was granted a permanent commission in the Royal Air Force (RAF) with the rank of captain, and later that month his home town of Southwold granted him the freedom of the borough "in recognition of his conspicuous services". He was also awarded the French Legion of Honour on 30 November 1918, and the Croix de Guerre with Palm on 15 July 1919.

Woollett served in No. 8 Squadron RAF in Iraq until 1 April 1922, when transferred to the Iraq Command Stores Depot. From 14 January 1923 he served as adjutant at the Mechanical Transport Workshops and Pool in Palestine Command, before being posted to the headquarters of RAF Middle East in Egypt, on 31 March 1924. He then served at No. 4 Flying Training School, Egypt, from 16 April 1924, until being returned to the Home Establishment on 1 November.

Woollett served in No. 24 Squadron RAF at RAF Kenley from 4 January 1927, and No. 43 Squadron RAF at RAF Tangmere from 26 June 1928, before being promoted to squadron leader on 12 December 1928. On 15 January 1930 Woollett was appointed Officer Commanding No. 23 Squadron RAF at Kenley, which comprised two flights of Bulldogs and one of Harts. One of the pilots assigned to his command was Douglas Bader, the Second World War ace. Woollett relinquished command of No. 23 Squadron on 9 December 1931, and on 3 February 1932 resigned his commission.

Woollett joined the Air League of the British Empire and was appointed London Area organiser of the Air Defence Cadet Corps in mid-1938. On 1 February 1941, during the Second World War, Woollett was granted a commission as an acting pilot officer "for the duration of hostilities" in the Training Branch of the Reserve of Air Force Officers, but resigned his commission on 10 February 1942.

Woollett died on 31 October 1969.

== Honours and awards ==
- Chevalier of the Legion d'Honneur (France) – 30 November 1918
- Croix de Guerre with Palm (France) – 15 July 1919

=== Military Cross ===
T./Lt. (T./Capt.) Henry Winslow Woollett, Gen. List and R.F.C. For conspicuous gallantry and devotion to duty in engaging three enemy aircraft and following them down to a low altitude behind the enemy's lines, destroying one and driving down another out of control during the operations. He has done excellent work as a patrol leader, and has always displayed great gallantry in aerial combats, having brought down three other enemy machines in addition to those already mentioned.

– London Gazette, 9 January 1918.

=== Bar to Military Cross ===
T./Capt. Henry Winslow Woollett, M.C., R.F.C. For conspicuous gallantry and devotion to duty. On one occasion, when on offensive patrol, he dived on to an enemy plane, which was attempting to cross our lines, and fired 100 rounds into it at 100 yards range, causing it to burst into flames and crash to the ground. He then dived on to another hostile machine, which went down in a spin and finally crashed to earth. On a later occasion he attacked and brought down in flames two enemy observation balloons. The gallantry and skill exhibited by this officer have been most inspiring to his flight.

– London Gazette, 22 June 1918.

=== Distinguished Service Order ===
T./Capt. Henry Winslow Woollett, M.C., Gen. List, attd. R.A.F. For conspicuous gallantry and devotion to duty during recent operations. In two days during three patrols he destroyed eight enemy machines, making his total twenty-two. His leadership, dash and courage were of the highest order.

– London Gazette, 16 September 1918.

== Bibliography ==
- Franks, Norman (2003). Sopwith Camel Aces of World War I. Aircraft of the Aces # 52. Oxford, UK: Osprey Publishing. ISBN 978-1-84176-534-1.
- Guttman, Jon (2005). Balloon-Busting Aces of World War I. Aircraft of the Aces # 66. Oxford, UK: Osprey Publishing. ISBN 978-1-84176-877-9.
