= George Milligan (physician) =

Scottish surgeon

George Milligan (?–9 March 1799) was a Scottish surgeon.

From Ayrshire, Scotland, in 1753 Milligan became Surgeon to His Majesty's Troops in South Carolina and began practicing medicine in Charleston. He was elected as a member to the American Philosophical Society in 1772.

Upon the outbreak of the Revolutionary War, he served as Surgeon of the Royal Garrison Battalion. A staunch loyalist and servant to the Crown, he reported that a mob harassed him and his wife, and ultimately forced them to escape Charleston in 1775.

He returned to Britain and died in Dumfries, Scotland.
