= Robert Milligan (footballer) =

Scottish footballer

Personal information
- Date of birth: 1892
- Place of birth: Stoneykirk, Scotland
- Date of death: 25 September 1915 (aged 22–23)
- Place of death: Loos-en-Gohelle, France

Senior career*
Years	Team	Apps	(Gls)
- Newton Villa
1912–1913	Clyde	1	(0)
- * Club domestic league appearances and goals

Robert Milligan (1892 – 25 September 1915) was a Scottish amateur footballer who played in the Scottish Football League for Clyde.

== Personal life ==
Milligan worked at Douglas Park Colliery near Bellshill. After the outbreak of the First World War in August 1914, Milligan enlisted as a private in the Seaforth Highlanders. He was killed in action during the Battle of Loos on 25 September 1915. He was commemorated on the Loos Memorial.
