= Rob Milligan (rugby union) =

English rugby union player

- Born: 17 April 1990 (age 36) Northampton, Northamptonshire
- Height: 1.91 m (6 ft 3 in)
- Weight: 94 kg (14 st 11 lb)
- School: Wellingborough School; Rugby School
- University: University of Nottingham

Rugby union career
- Position: Number Eight
Senior career
Years	Team	Apps	(Points)
2008	Northampton Saints		

Rob Milligan (born 17 April 1990 in Northampton, Northamptonshire, England) is a former a rugby union player for Northampton Saints in the Guinness Premiership. He played as a number 8. Like many Northampton Saints players, he began his career at Northampton Old Scouts RFC, like his former team-mate Courtney Lawes.

He attended Rugby School as a day pupil in Town House, was head of school and captained their first XV.

Milligan made his only Saints appearance in an EDF Energy Cup match against Bristol Rugby.

Milligan retired from rugby after the 2008–09 season due to medical advice. He has decided to pursue a career in rowing.
