= Mulligan (surname) =

Mulligan is a surname originating from England and Ireland, coming from the anglicized form of the Irish Ó Maolagáin literally meaning 'grandson of the bald man'.

== People ==
People with this surname include:

- Andy Mulligan (author), English writer
- Blackjack Mulligan, ring name of name of American professional wrestler Robert Windham (1942–2016)
- Brennan Lee Mulligan (born 1988), American comedian, writer, and performer
- Carey Mulligan, British actress
- Charles Mulligan, American sculptor
- Cynthia Mulligan, Canadian television personality
- David B. Mulligan, Hotel Executive
- Dave Mulligan, New Zealand footballer
- Declan Mulligan (1938-2021), Irish-born American rock musician
- Eddie Mulligan, American baseball player
- Gary Mulligan, Irish footballer
- Gayle Mulligan, American politician
- Geoff Mulligan, American computer scientist
- Gerry Mulligan, American musician
- Hercules Mulligan, a spy for the patriot forces in the American Revolutionary War
- James A. Mulligan, American Civil War soldier
- James Hillary Mulligan, American judge, politician, and poet
- James Venture Mulligan, Australian bushman and prospector
- John Mulligan, new wave musician with Fashion (1978–84)
- John Mulligan (baseball), American baseball player for one game in 1884
- Kevin Mulligan, British philosopher
- Leith Mulligan, Australian sports journalist
- Marty Mulligan, Australian tennis player
- Mary Mulligan, Scottish politician
- Mary Jane Mulligan, American politician
- Michael Mulligan, American military prosecutor
- Noel Mulligan, Australian rugby league footballer
- Richard Mulligan (1932–2000), American actor
- Richard Mulligan (footballer), New Zealand footballer
- Robert Mulligan, American film director
- Rosemary Mulligan, American politician
- Terry David Mulligan, Canadian actor
- Thom Michael Mulligan, American actor
- William Hughes Mulligan, American judge

== Fictional characters ==
- Buck Mulligan, a fictional character in James Joyce's novel Ulysses

== See also ==
- Mulligan (disambiguation)
- Ted Mullighan (1939–2011), an Australian judge
