= 1923 County Championship =

English cricket tournament

- Cricket format: First-class cricket
- Tournament format: League system
- Champions: Yorkshire (12th title)
- Participants: 17

The 1923 County Championship was the 30th officially organised running of the County Championship. Yorkshire County Cricket Club won the championship title. Final placings were still decided by calculating the percentage of points gained against possible points available.

In May 1923, Jack Hobbs scored his 100th century in first-class cricket, batting for Surrey against Somerset.

== Table ==
- Five points were awarded for a win.
- Two points were awarded for "winning" the first innings of a drawn match.
- Final placings were decided by calculating the percentage of possible points.

County Championship table
Team	Pld	W	L	DWF	DLF	NR	Pts	%PC
Yorkshire	32	25	1	4	1	1	133	85.80
Nottinghamshire	26	15	3	5	2	1	85	68.00
Lancashire	30	15	2	6	6	1	87	60.00
Surrey	26	15	9	0	3	1	67	58.26
Kent	28	15	8	2	5	0	75	55.55
Sussex	30	15	8	2	5	0	79	52.66
Hampshire	28	10	8	6	3	1	62	45.92
Middlesex	22	7	7	5	3	0	45	40.90
Somerset	24	9	11	1	3	0	47	39.16
Derbyshire	22	4	7	6	4	1	32	30.47
Gloucestershire	28	7	16	3	2	0	41	29.29
Warwickshire	26	6	12	3	2	0	36	28.80
Essex	26	6	11	3	6	0	36	27.69
Leicestershire	24	5	13	4	2	0	33	27.50
Worcestershire	26	5	16	1	4	0	27	20.76
Glamorgan	24	2	17	2	3	0	14	11.66
Northamptonshire	22	2	16	1	3	0	12	10.90
