= Dolphus E. Milligan =

American Physical Chemist

Dolphus Edward Milligan (June 17, 1928, Brighton, Alabama – October 18, 1973, Gaithersburg, Maryland) was an internationally acclaimed American chemist, best known for his spectroscopic studies of free radicals and other reactive molecules. He received his bachelor's degree in chemistry from Morehouse College in Atlanta in 1949. He earned a master's degree in organic chemistry and mathematics (M.S) from Atlanta University in 1951. He then accepted a position as a chemistry instructor in Fort Valley State College in Georgia where he taught until 1954.

In 1954, he moved to California where he was admitted to the University of California at Berkeley to pursue a doctoral degree. In 1996, When Robert F. Curl accepted the Nobel Prize in chemistry he expressed his appreciation for Milligan’s help on his earlier more volatile experiments. Milligan obtained his Ph.D. in physical chemistry in 1958. His research focused on spectroscopic study of reaction intermediates at extremely low temperature. After completing this doctorate he joined the Mellon Institute of Industrial Research in Pittsburgh where he conducted basic research. In 1963, he joined the National Bureau of Standards as a physical chemist.

In 1970, he became an adjunct professor at Howard University while retaining his position at Mellon. He was a member of the American Chemical Society and American Physical Society and he assisted other African Americans succeed in the sciences by helping to establish and serving as a member of the Executive Committee of the National Organization for the Professional Advancement of Black Chemists and Chemical Engineers (NOPABCCE). In 1971, he became the chief of the photochemistry section of the National Bureau of Standards (NIST).

Milligan was a member of both the American Chemical Society (ACS) and the American Physical Society. On October 18, 1973, aged 45, he died suddenly in his NIST office in Gaithersburg, Maryland where he was chief of the photochemistry section at the National Bureau of Standards. He was survived by his wife Thedola and his two sons, Stephen and Charles.

== Legacy ==
A scholarship fund was established at Morehouse College in his memory in 1974. In 2003, the University of Maryland, College Park established a fellowship in his honor in Collaboration with the National Institute of Standards and Technology (NIST).

== Sources ==
- Scheer, D. Milton "Dolphus E. Milligan", Physics Today. 1974, 89, doi:10.1063/1.3128477
- "Robert R. Curl, Jr., Autobiography,". November 9, 2001.
- Sammons, Vivian Ovelton. Blacks in Science and Medicine. New York: Hemisphere Publishing, 1990; ISBN 0891166653 / ISBN 9780891166658.
- Ray Spangenburg and Kit Moser. African Americans in Science, Math, and Invention. New York, 2003. ISBN 0-8160-4806-1
