= Wellingborough School =

Public school in Northamptonshire, England

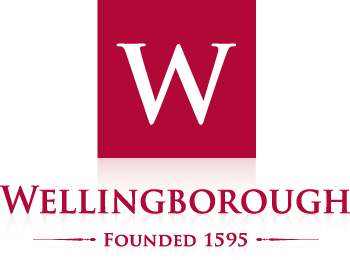

Location
- London Road; Wellingborough, Northamptonshire, NN8 2BX; England
- 52.2976°N 0.6873°W

Information
- Type: Private school Co-educational; Day school
- Motto: Salus in Arduis (Transl: A Stronghold/Refuge in Difficulties)
- Established: 1595; 431 years ago
- Department for Education URN: 122131 Tables
- Chairman of Governors: Matthew Watson
- Headmaster: Simon Hawkes
- Gender: Coeducational
- Age: 3 to 18
- Enrolment: 880~
- Houses: Marsh, Neville, Garnes, Cripps, Weymouth, Platts, Parker-Steynes, Marsh
- Colours: Maroon and White
- Former pupils: Old Wellingburians
- Website: http://www.wellingboroughschool.org/

Wellingborough School is a co-educational private day school in the market town of Wellingborough in Northamptonshire. It was established in 1595 and is one of the oldest schools in the country. The school today consists of a Prep school (ages 3–10) Senior school (ages 11–16) and a sixth form (ages 16–18).

== History ==
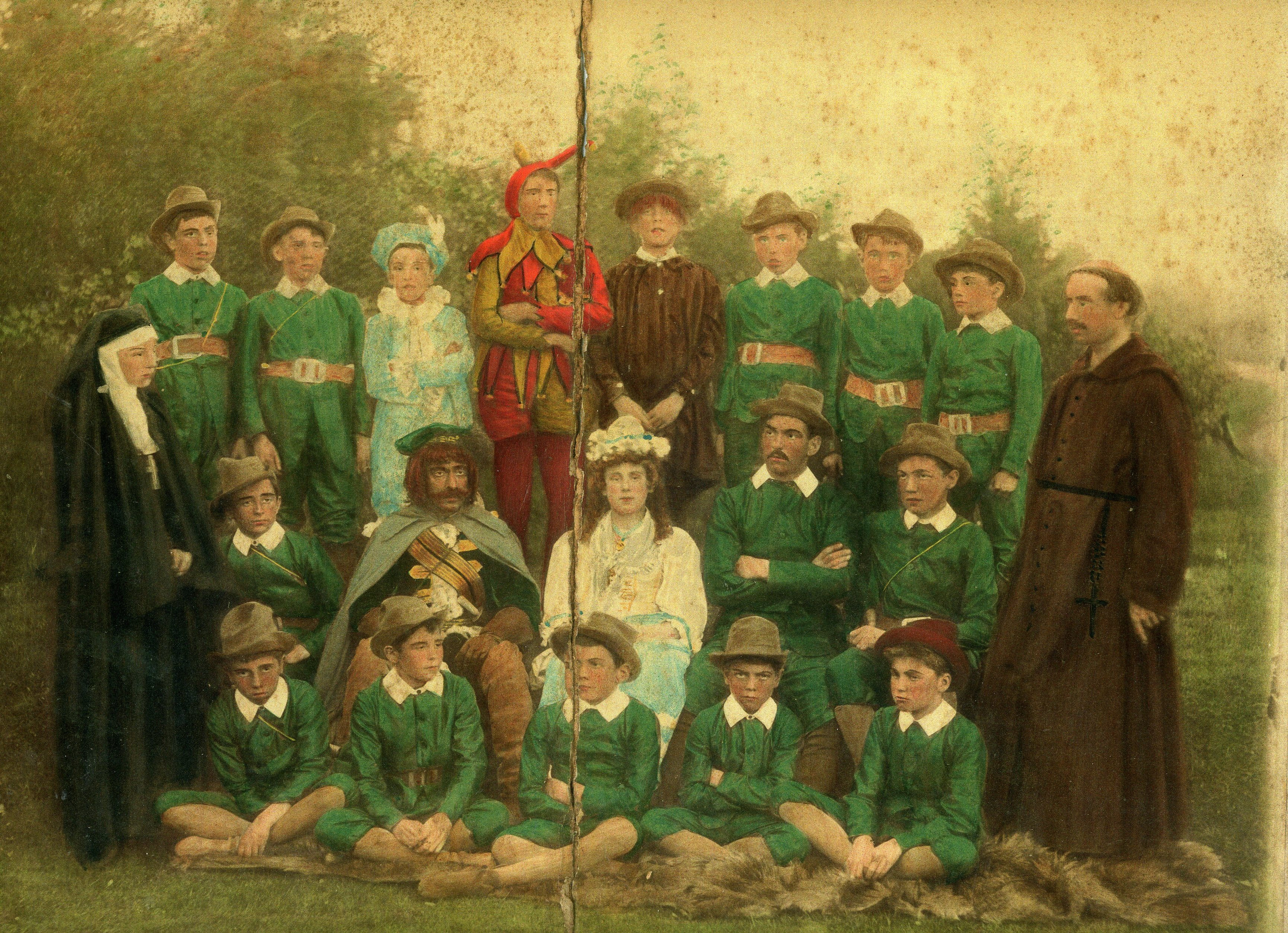
The cast of Colin McAlpin's opera Robin Hood, at Wellingborough School, ca.1885

The original school was a Tudor grammar school in the centre of the town; its original building, built 1617 at a cost of 25 pounds, still survives, now occupied by a local cafe. In January 1881 the school moved under the 28th headmaster to its present 45-acre (180,000 m^{2}) site on the edge of Wellingborough.

During World War I, about 1,060 alumni of the school saw action. These included the flying-ace Henry Winslow Woollett, famous for 35 victories in the air. 181 old boys and masters were killed in action, among them the former school chaplain, Bernard Vann, who was awarded the Victoria Cross posthumously.

Between the wars, the school's sporting prowess continued, and in 1929 a thatched pavilion was built on the playing fields, paid for out of tuckshop profits. The pavilion has the front door step of the former home of W.G. Grace, acquired in 1939 when his old home in Bristol was demolished. One local boy who sat the scholarship entrance exam unsuccessfully was H.E. Bates.

By 1940 the school was failing. It was saved by the arrival of boys from two other schools. The first comprised 33 boys and masters from Weymouth College, a public school in Dorset which was closing; their arrival was marked by the addition of a house to the school: Weymouth House was originally a house for boys, but it became a house for girls in the late 1980s, as the number of female students increased. The second arrival was a group of boys from Lynfield Preparatory School in Norfolk, with their headmaster Robert Britten, the elder brother of the composer Benjamin Britten. The school was led by Thomas Nevill from 1940 to 1956.

In World War II, 95 old boys were killed in action. Among survivors was Major George Drew. A serial escaper, he spent most of the war in Colditz. The most distinguished old boy was group captain James Brian Tait, one of the RAF's most highly decorated bomber pilots, who led the attack which sank the German battleship Tirpitz in 1944.

In 1965 the school received a visit from Queen Elizabeth II. This was arranged by the chairman of the governors, Albert Edward John Spencer, 7th Earl Spencer (chairman 1946-72).

Until the late 1970s the school was still predominantly for boarders. Girls were admitted for the first time in 1970 and it became fully co-educational in 1979, following the sudden closure of Overstone School in Northamptonshire. After over 400 years of boarding tradition, it stopped offering boarding from the 2000-01 school year onwards.

== Notable former pupils ==
For details of some well-known alumni, see List of Old Wellingburians

== See also ==
- Wellingborough School Cricket Ground
