= Kingston (surname) =

Kingston is an English surname. Notable people with the surname include:

- Alex Kingston (born 1963), English actress
- Beverley Kingston (born 1941), Australian historian
- Charles Kingston (1850–1908), Premier of South Australia

- Charles Kingston (disambiguation), several other people

- Eddie Kingston (born 1981), American professional wrestler
- George Strickland Kingston (1807–1880), surveyor and politician in South Australia
- Jack Kingston (born 1955), American politician
- Jarrett Kingston (born 1999), American football player
- Jeff Kingston (born 1957), American author
- John de Kingston (died after 1336), English knight
- John E. Kingston (1925–1996), New York politician and judge
- Judith Kingston (1949–2016), English paediatric oncologist
- Kevin Kingston (born 1983), Australian Rugby League player
- Kiwi Kingston (1914–1992), wrestler and actor from New Zealand
- Kofi Kingston (born 1981), ring name of Kofi Sarkodie-Mensah, Ghanaian wrestler
- Laryea Kingston (born 1980), Ghanaian footballer
- Mark Kingston (1934–2011), English actor
- Maxine Hong Kingston (born 1940), Chinese-American author
- Parker Kingston, American football player
- Paul Elden Kingston (born 1959), leader of the Mormon fundamentalist Latter Day Church of Christ
- Phil Kingston (born 1936), climate activist and protester in the United Kingdom
- Robert Kingston (1928–2007), United States Army General
- S. G. Kingston (1848–1897), South Australia lawyer, son of George Strickland
- Sean Kingston (born 1990), Jamaican hip hop artist
- Thomas Kingston (1978–2024), British diplomat, financier and royal
- Tom Kingston (rugby union) (born 1991), Australian rugby union player
- Tom Kingston (rugby league) (born 1988), Australian rugby league player
- Vera Kingston (1917–1996), English swimmer
- Wendy Kingston, Australian newsreader for Nine News
- William Kingston (1476–1540), Constable of the Tower of London
- William Henry Giles Kingston (1814–1880), English writer

== See also ==
- Senator Kingston (disambiguation)
- Kingston (disambiguation)
- Earl of Kingston, a title in the Peerage of Ireland, including Baron Kingston and Viscount Kingston
- Duke of Kingston-upon-Hull, a title in the Peerage of Great Britain, and Earl of Kingston-upon-Hull, a title in the Peerage of England
- Richard Kingson, a professional football goalkeeper
