= Jim Kingston (cricketer) =

English cricketer

James Phillips Kingston (8 July 1857 – 14 March 1929) was an English cricketer active from 1875 to 1894 who played for Northamptonshire (Northants) and Warwickshire. He was born in Hardingstone, Northamptonshire and died in Naples, Italy.

Kingston was a righthanded batsman who bowled leg breaks. He appeared in one first-class match in 1894 for Warwickshire and scored 24 runs in his only innings. He had a long career with Northants from its foundation in 1878 until 1892. Kingston was the first officially appointed Northants club captain, holding the post from 1878 to 1887 and again in 1890 and 1891.

Andrew Radd describes Kingston as "truly a Northamptonshire cricketing pioneer". Kingston was a key figure in the foundation of the club, became its first captain and eventually its first paid administrator. He was one of nine brothers, eight of whom played for Northants including Charles, Frederick, Hubert, William, George, and Walter, and first became involved in 1875 when he played for an ad hoc county team. On 31 July 1878, he played for South Northants against North Northants on the Racecourse Ground Promenade in Northampton and scored 128. That evening, he attended a meeting in the town's George Hotel which formed the county club and elected its first committee of sixteen members, including Kingston himself who was then 21 years old and appointed team captain. Kingston became a solicitor but managed to combine his cricket with his profession. In May 1886, he captained Northants in their first-ever match at the Wantage Road County Ground.

In 1891, Kingston became the first paid administrator at Northants as club secretary but this was an unhappy and short-lived experience. The club's finance were "in a mess when he took up the post". The deficit was deepening daily with an added threat to the club of litigation by one of its professional bowlers. Kingston soon resigned and, a year later, retired from playing as he was moving his business to Birmingham. However, he joined Warwickshire for a short period and was finally able to make his first-class debut, playing against Leicestershire in 1894.

After his wife died a few years later, Kingston quit England and emigrated to Italy where he was an English teacher for the rest of his working life. He died in Naples, aged 71.

== Sources ==
- Andrew Radd, 100 Greats – Northamptonshire County Cricket Club, Tempus, 2001
