= Charles Kingston (disambiguation) =

Charles Kingston (1850–1908) was premier of South Australia and member of the federal Australian parliament.

Charles Kingston may also refer to:

- Charles Kingston (Mormon) (1856–1944), leader of The Church of Jesus Christ of Latter-day Saints in Wyoming
- Charles Kingston (cricketer) (1865–1917), English cricketer
- Charles Morgan Kingston (1867–1948), Canadian politician
- Charles W. Kingston (1884–1975), Mormon fundamentalist leader
- Charles Elden Kingston (1909–1947), Mormon fundamentalist leader
