= Jim Kingston (disambiguation) =

Jim Kingston can refer to:

- Jim Kingston, an American politician
- Jim Kingston (cricketer)
