= National debt of the United States =

U.S. federal government debt (United States national debt)

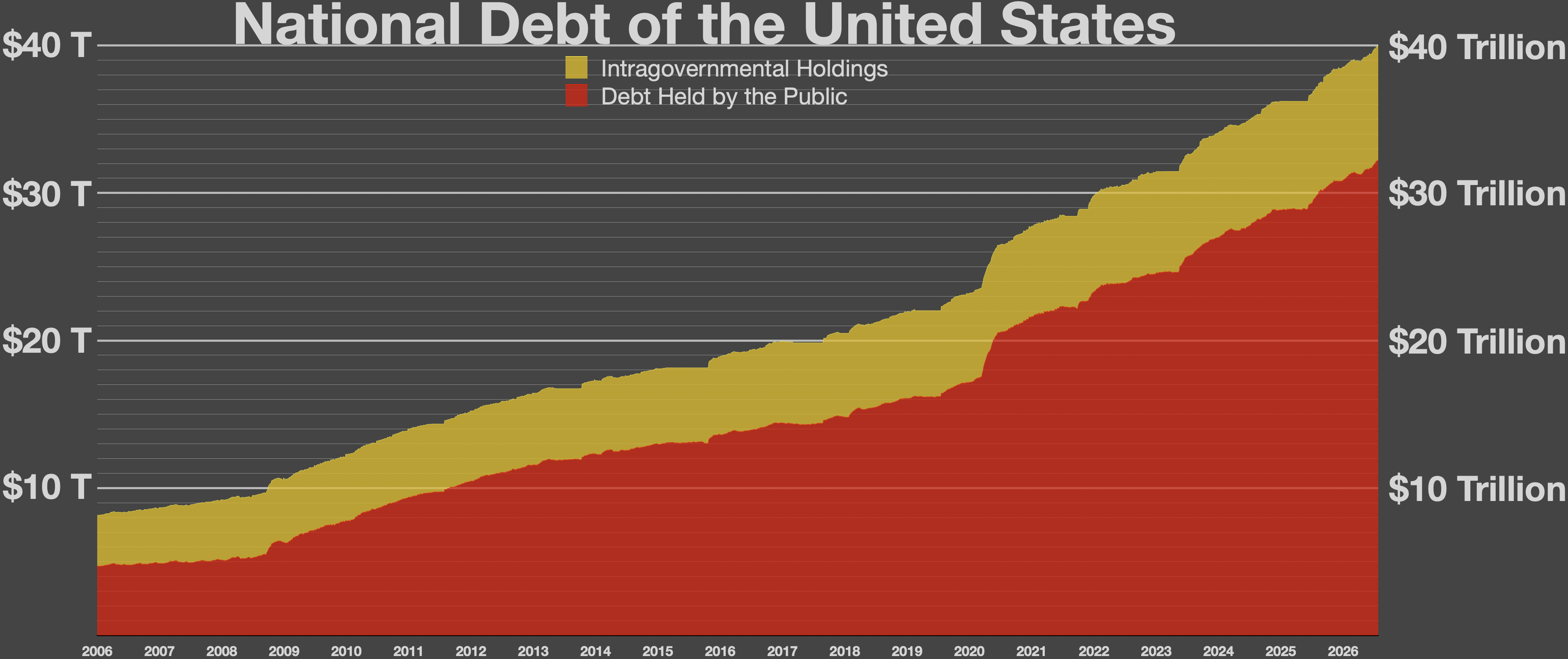
National debt of the United States Intragovernmental holdings Debt held by the public The federal government debt surpassed $40 trillion on August 18, 2026.

The national debt of the United States is the total national debt owed by the federal government of the United States to treasury security holders. At any given point in time, the U.S. national debt is the cumulative face value of all outstanding treasury securities that have been issued by the U.S. Department of Treasury and American federal agencies. It does not generally include unfunded or future obligations. The U.S. has the largest external debt in the world alongside the world's largest economy. The ratio of debt to GDP oscillates as economic growth, inflation, or public finances change. The U.S. debt-to-GDP ratio has historically increased during armed conflicts, pandemics, and economic recessions and then subsequently declines. The national debt exceeds total annual U.S. economic output.

The federal government generates revenue through taxation before spending on public services, creating a government budget balance. If not balanced, the government produces either a "national deficit" or "national surplus". If public spending exceeds revenue, the deficit is financed by borrowing money and taking on debt. If revenue exceeds public spending, the surplus is used to reduce the debt. The national debt is the cumulative debt the government takes on to finance deficits. This debt typically increases with higher government spending and decreases with higher tax receipts, both of which fluctuate during a fiscal year. The government is limited in how much it can borrow in aggregate through the U.S. debt ceiling established by the U.S. Congress.

There are two main components of U.S. national debt:

- Debt held by the public: held by investors outside the federal government, including those held by individuals, corporations, the U.S. Federal Reserve, and foreign, state and local governments.
- Debt held by government (intragovernmental debt): non-marketable Treasury securities held in accounts of programs administered by the federal government, such as the Social Security Trust Fund.

== History ==
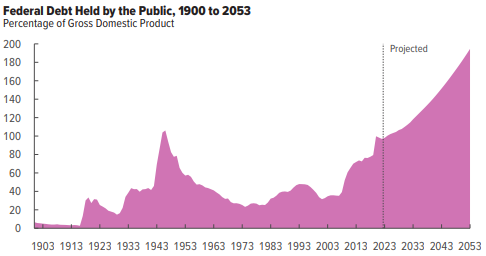
The amount of U.S. public debt, measured as a percentage of GDP, held by the public from 1900 to 2023

The United States federal government has continuously had a fluctuating public debt since its formation in 1789, except for about a year during 1835–1836, a period in which the nation, during the presidency of Andrew Jackson, completely paid the national debt. To allow comparisons over the years, public debt is often expressed as a ratio to GDP. The United States public debt as a percentage of GDP reached its highest level during Harry Truman's first presidential term, during and after World War II. Public debt as a percentage of GDP fell rapidly in the post-World War II period and reached a low in 1974 under president Richard Nixon. Debt as a share of GDP has consistently increased since then, except during the presidencies of Jimmy Carter and Bill Clinton.

Public debt rose sharply during the 1980s, as Ronald Reagan negotiated with Congress to cut tax rates and increase military spending. It fell during the 1990s because of decreased military spending, increased taxes and the 1990s U.S. economic boom. Public debt rose sharply during the presidency of George W. Bush and after the 2008 financial crisis, with resulting significant tax revenue declines and spending increases, such as the Emergency Economic Stabilization Act of 2008 and the American Recovery and Reinvestment Act of 2009.

In September 2018, the U.S. Congressional Budget Office (CBO) wrote that the federal budget deficit was c.$782 billion for the fiscal year 2018—which ran from October 2017 to September 2018. This was $116 billion more than in FY2017. The Treasury statements as summarized in the CBO report showed that corporate taxes for 2017 and 2018 declined by $92 billion representing a drop of 31%. The CBO added that "about half of the decline ... occurred since June" when some of the provisions of the Tax Cuts and Jobs Act of 2017 took effect, which included the "new lower corporate tax rate and the expanded ability to immediately deduct the full value of equipment purchases" (~$1.69 trillion in 2025).

According to articles in The Wall Street Journal and Business Insider, based on documents released on October 29, 2018, by the U.S. Treasury Department, the department's projection estimated that by the fourth quarter of the FY2018, it would have issued c. $1.338 trillion (~$1.69 trillion in 2025) in debt. This would have been the highest debt issuance since 2010, when it reached $1.586 trillion (~$2.28 trillion in 2025). The Treasury anticipated that the total "net marketable debt"—net marketable securities—issued in the fourth quarter would reach $425 billion; which would raise the 2018 "total debt issuance" to over a trillion dollars of new debt, representing a "146% jump from 2017". That is the highest fourth quarter issuance "since 2008, at the height of the financial crisis." The primary drivers of new debt issuance are "stagnant", "sluggish tax revenues", a decrease in "corporate tax revenue", due to the GOP Tax Cuts and Jobs Act of 2017, the "bipartisan budget agreement", and "higher government spending". Due to the Coronavirus epidemic, the national debt rose to levels that exceeded what had been seen during World War Two, meaning that the U.S. had officially grown its debt amount to never before seen numbers.

During the COVID-19 pandemic, the federal government spent trillions in virus aid and economic relief. The Congressional Budget Office (CBO) estimated that the budget deficit for fiscal year 2020 would increase to $3.3 trillion or 16% GDP, more than triple that of 2019 and the largest as a percentage of GDP since 1945. In December 2021, debt held by the public was estimated at 0.962 times GDP, and approximately 33% of this public debt was owned by foreigners (government and private).

In February 2024, the CBO estimated that Federal debt held by the public is projected to rise from 99 percent of GDP in 2024, to 116 percent in 2034, and would continue to grow if current laws generally remained unchanged. Over that period, the growth of interest costs and mandatory spending outpaces the growth of revenues and the economy, driving up debt. If those factors persist beyond 2034, the result would be to push federal debt higher still, to 172 percent of GDP in 2054.

In December 2021, the total amount of U.S. Treasury securities held by foreign entities was $7.7 trillion, up from $7.1 trillion in December 2020. Total U.S. federal government debt breached the $30 trillion mark for the first time in history in February 2022. In December 2023, total federal debt was $33.1 trillion; $26.5 trillion held by the public and $12.1 trillion in intragovernmental debt. The annualized cost of servicing this debt was $726 billion in July 2023, which accounted for 14% of the total federal spending. In recent decades, aging demographics and rising healthcare costs have led to concern about the long-term sustainability of the federal government's fiscal policies. In February 2024, the total federal government debt rose to $34.4 trillion, after increasing by approximately $1 trillion during each of two separate 100-day periods since the previous June. In 2024, federal interest payments on the national debt surpassed spending on both Medicare and national defense.

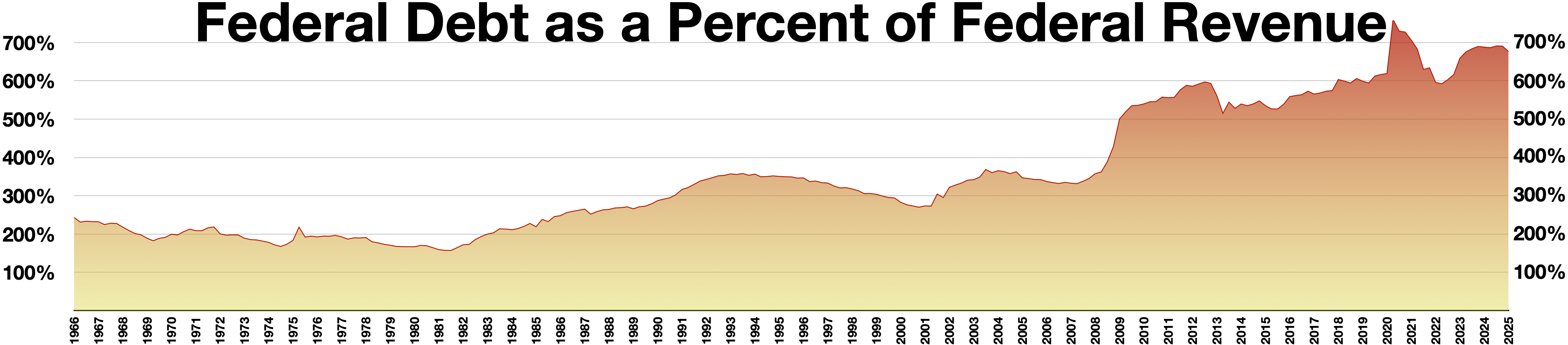
Federal debt to annual revenue ratio, 1966 to 2025

On October 23, 2025, the national debt reached $38 trillion, a new high. The milestone was achieved amidst a Federal government shutdown, which by then had been going on for 23 days. The shutdown caused delays in economic activity and the postponement of financial decisions, pushing the number up even further. An increase of $1 trillion, from $37 to $38 trillion, was recorded between August 12 and October 23 of the same year, a time interval of merely 71 days. More than $382 billion of debt were added in the first 23 days of the government shutdown alone, according to the Joint Economic Committee (JEC), translating to an average rate of increase of $192,200 per second.

On August 18, 2026, the national debt reached a new high of $40 trillion, after doubling since 2016 largely due to tariff refunds and COVID-19 pandemic relief spending.

== Valuation and measurements ==
=== Public and government accounts ===
The national debt can be classified into marketable or non-marketable securities. Most of the marketable securities are Treasury notes, bills, and bonds held by investors and governments globally. The non-marketable securities are mainly the "government account series" owed to certain government trust funds such as the Social Security Trust Fund, which represented $2.82 trillion (~$3.64 trillion in 2025 dollars) in 2017.

The non-marketable securities represent amounts owed to program beneficiaries. For example, the cash is received but spent for other purposes. If the government continues to run deficits in other parts of the budget, the government will have to issue debt held by the public to fund the Social Security Trust Fund, in effect exchanging one type of debt for the other. Other large intragovernmental holders include the Federal Housing Administration, the Federal Savings and Loan Corporation's Resolution Fund and the Federal Hospital Insurance Trust Fund (Medicare).

=== Accounting treatment ===
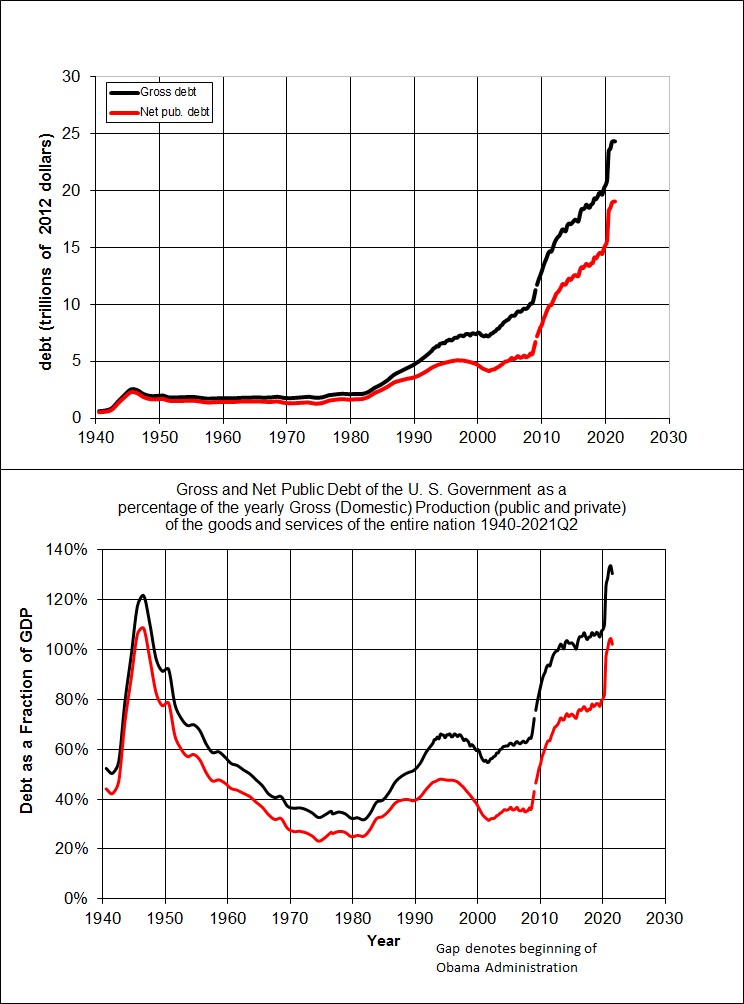
U.S. debt from 1940 to 2021 Q2. Red lines indicate the "debt held by the public" and black lines indicate the total national debt or gross public debt.

Only debt held by the public is reported as a liability on the consolidated financial statements of the United States government. Debt held by U.S. government accounts is an asset to those accounts but a liability to the Treasury; they offset each other in the consolidated financial statements. Government receipts and expenditures are normally presented on a cash rather than an accrual basis, although the accrual basis may provide more information on the longer-term implications of the government's annual operations. The United States public debt is often expressed as a ratio of public debt to GDP. The ratio of debt to GDP may decrease as a result of a government surplus as well as from growth of GDP and inflation.

=== Fannie Mae and Freddie Mac obligations excluded ===
Under normal accounting rules, fully owned companies would be consolidated into the books of their owners, but the large size of Fannie Mae and Freddie Mac has made U.S. governments reluctant to incorporate them into its own books. When the two mortgage companies required bail-outs, White House Budget Director Jim Nussle, on September 12, 2008, initially indicated their budget plans would not incorporate the government-sponsored enterprise (GSE) debt into the budget because of the temporary nature of the conservator intervention. As the intervention has dragged out, some pundits began to question this accounting treatment, noting that changes in August 2012 "makes them even more permanent wards of the state and turns the government's preferred stock into a permanent, perpetual kind of security".

The federal government controls the Public Company Accounting Oversight Board, which would normally criticize inconsistent accounting practices, but it does not oversee its own government's accounting practices or the standards set by the Federal Accounting Standards Advisory Board. The on- or off-balance sheet obligations of those two independent GSEs was just over $5 trillion at the time the conservatorship was put in place, consisting mainly of mortgage payment guarantees and agency bonds. The confusing independent but government-controlled status of the GSEs resulted in investors of the legacy common shares and preferred shares launching various activist campaigns in 2014.

=== Guaranteed obligations excluded ===
U.S. federal government guarantees were not included in the public debt total as they were not drawn against. In late 2008, the federal government had guaranteed large amounts of obligations of mutual funds, banks, and corporations under several programs designed to deal with the problems arising from the 2008 financial crisis. The guarantee program lapsed at the end of 2012, when Congress declined to extend the scheme. The funding of direct investments made in response to the crisis, such as those made under the Troubled Asset Relief Program, was included in the debt totals.

=== Unfunded obligations excluded ===
The U.S. federal government is obligated under current law to make mandatory payments for programs such as Medicare, Medicaid and Social Security. The Government Accountability Office (GAO) projects that payouts for these programs will significantly exceed tax revenues over the next 75 years. The Medicare Part A (hospital insurance) payouts already exceed program tax revenues, and Social Security payouts exceeded payroll taxes in fiscal year 2010. These deficits require funding from other tax sources or borrowing.

In 2010, the value of these deficits or unfunded obligations was an estimated $45.8 trillion. This is the amount that would have had to be set aside in 2009 in order to pay for the unfunded obligations which, under current law, will have to be raised by the government in the future. Approximately $7.7 trillion relates to Social Security, while $38.2 trillion relates to Medicare and Medicaid. In other words, health care programs will require nearly five times more funding than Social Security. Adding this to the national debt and other federal obligations would bring total obligations to nearly $62 trillion. These unfunded obligations are not counted in the national debt, as shown in monthly Treasury reports of the national debt.

=== Measuring burden of debt ===
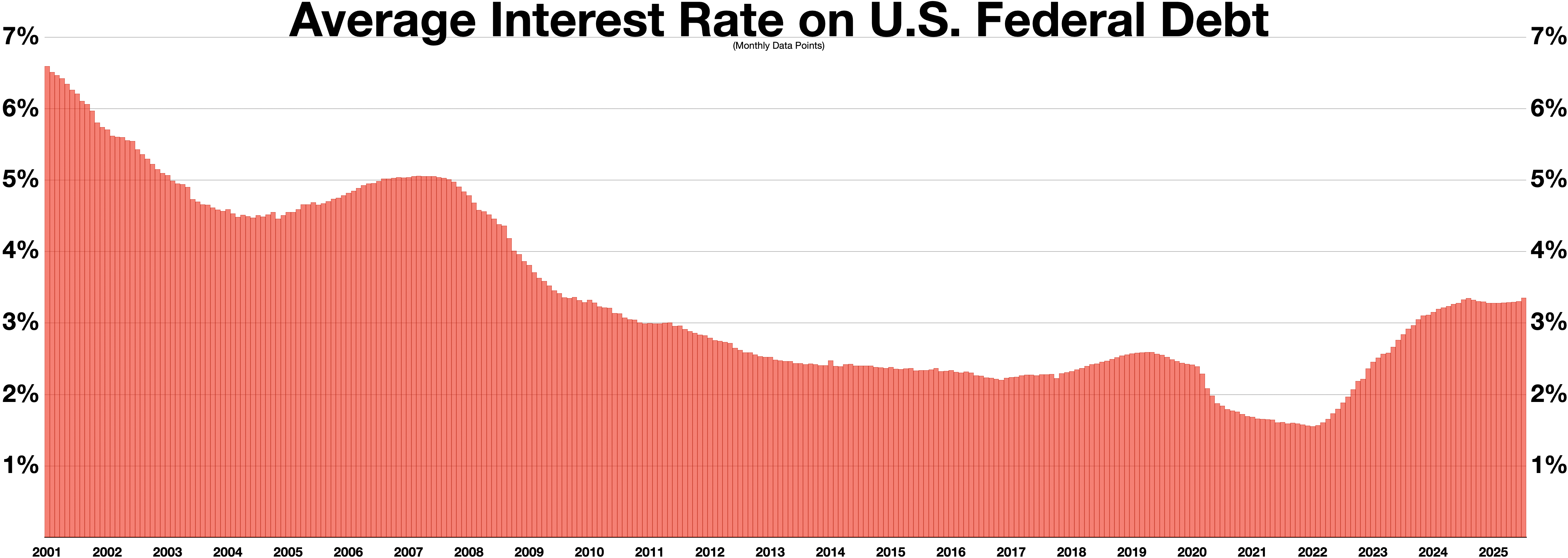
The average interest rate on U.S. federal debt, 2001 to 2025

Public debt as a percent of GDP, 1900 to 2016

GDP is a measure of the total size and output of the economy. One measure of the debt burden is its size relative to GDP, called the "debt-to-GDP ratio". Mathematically, this is the debt divided by the GDP amount. The Congressional Budget Office includes historical budget and debt tables along with its annual "Budget and Economic Outlook". Debt held by the public rose from 0.347 times GDP in 2000, to 0.405 times GDP in 2008, and 0.677 times GDP in 2011.

Mathematically, the ratio can decrease even while debt grows if the rate of increase in GDP (which also takes account of inflation) is higher than the rate of increase of debt. Conversely, the debt to GDP ratio can increase even while debt is being reduced, if the decline in GDP is sufficient. Because much of the debt that was incurred as a result of World War Two could not be passed onto American citizens who also had no money to spare, the debt was never addressed and continued to grow.

In 2015, the U.S. debt to GDP ratio of 0.736 was the 39th highest in the world. This was measured using "debt held by the public." $1 trillion in additional borrowing since the end of FY 2015 raised the ratio to 0.762 as of April 2016. This number excludes state and local debt. In 2015, general government gross debt (federal, state, and local) in the fourth quarter was $22.5 trillion (1.25 times GDP). Subtracting out $5.25 trillion for intragovernmental federal debt, to count only federal "debt held by the public", gave 96% of GDP.

The ratio is higher if the total national debt is used, by adding the "intragovernmental debt" to the "debt held by the public." For example, on April 29, 2016, debt held by the public was approximately $13.84 trillion (~$18.2 trillion in 2025), or about 0.76 times GDP. Intra-governmental holdings stood at $5.35 trillion, giving a combined total public debt of $19.19 trillion. U.S. GDP for the previous 12 months was approximately $18.15 trillion, for a total debt to GDP ratio of approximately 1.06. Increasing and untreated national debt leads to a significantly diminished ability for the economy to operate at its highest level.

=== Calculating annual change in debt ===
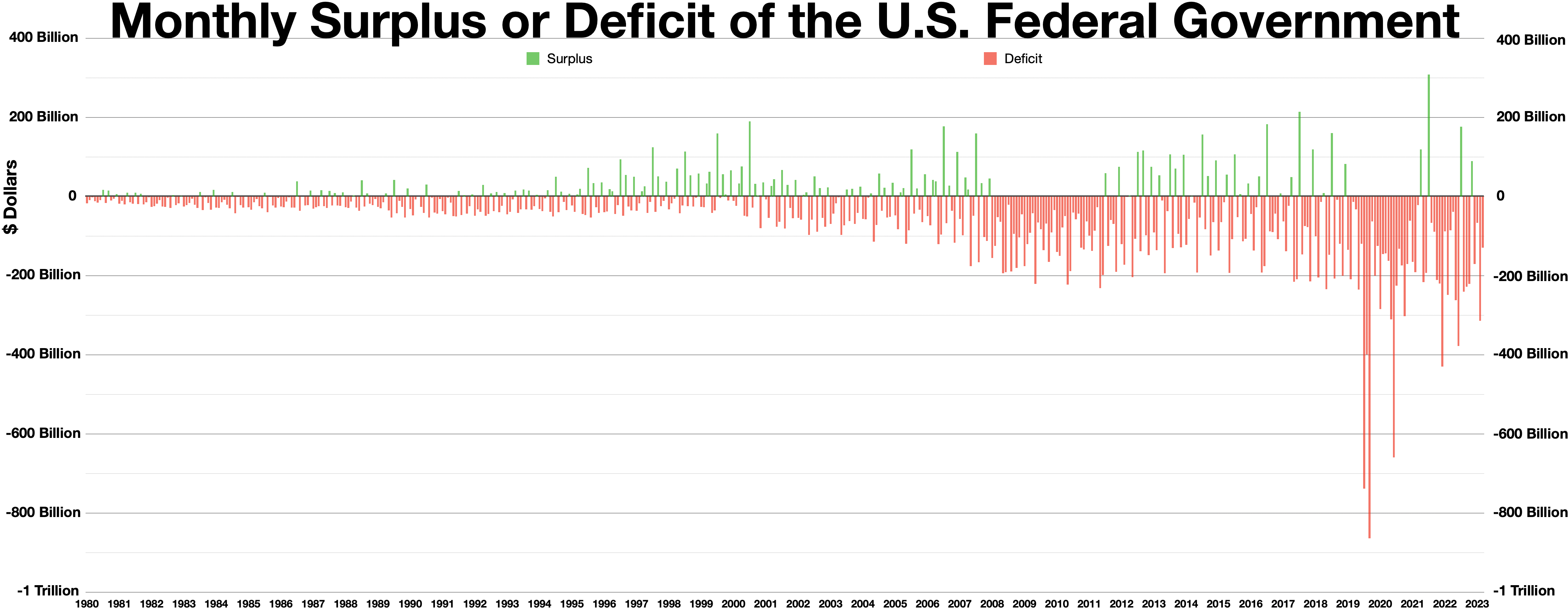
Monthly deficits or surplus, 1980 to 2023

Conceptually, an annual deficit (or surplus) should represent the change in the national debt, with a deficit adding to the national debt and a surplus reducing it. There is complexity in the budgetary computations that can make the deficit figure commonly reported in the media (the "total deficit") considerably different from the annual increase in the debt. The major categories of differences are the treatment of the Social Security program, Treasury borrowing, and supplemental appropriations outside the budget process.

Social Security payroll taxes and benefit payments, along with the net balance of the U.S. Postal Service, are considered "off-budget", while most other expenditure and receipt categories are considered "on-budget". The total federal deficit is the sum of the on-budget deficit (or surplus) and the off-budget deficit (or surplus). Since FY1960, the federal government has run on-budget deficits except for FY1999 and FY2000, and total federal deficits except in FY1969 and FY1998–FY2001.

For example, in January 2009 the CBO reported that for FY2008, the "on-budget deficit" was $638 billion, offset by an "off-budget surplus" (mainly due to Social Security revenue in excess of payouts) of $183 billion, for a "total deficit" of $455 billion. This latter figure is the one commonly reported in the media. An additional $313 billion was required for "the Treasury actions aimed at stabilizing the financial markets," an unusually high amount because of the subprime mortgage crisis.

This meant that the "debt held by the public" increased by $768 billion ($455B + $313B = $768B). The "off-budget surplus" was borrowed and spent, as is typically the case, increasing the "intra-governmental debt" by $183 billion. So the total increase in the "national debt" in FY2008 was $768B +$183B = $951 billion. The Treasury Department reported an increase in the national debt of $1,017B for FY2008. The $66 billion difference is likely from "supplemental appropriations" for the war on terror, some of which were outside the budget process entirely until President Obama began including most of them in his FY2010 budget.

In other words, spending the "off budget" Social Security surplus adds to the total national debt (by increasing the intragovernmental debt), while the "off-budget" surplus reduces the "total" deficit reported in the media. Certain spending called "supplemental appropriations" is outside the budget process entirely but adds to the national debt. Funding for the Iraq and Afghanistan wars was accounted for this way prior to the Obama administration. Certain stimulus measures and earmarks were also outside the budget process. The federal government publishes the total debt owed (public and intragovernmental holdings) daily.

== Holders of debt ==
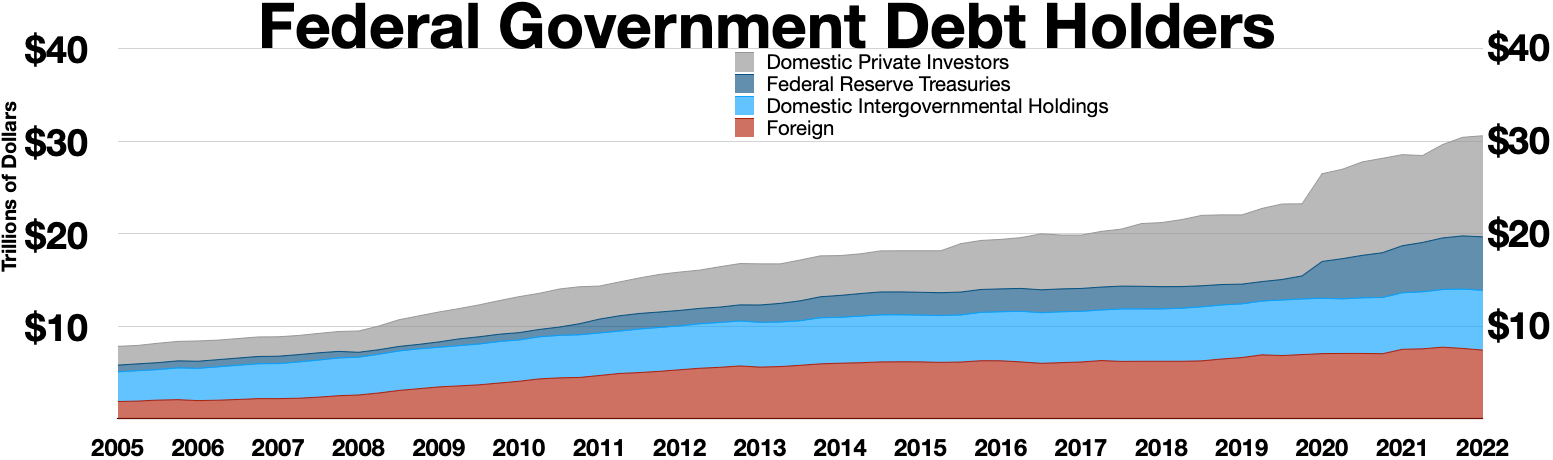
Federal Government debt holders, 2005 to 2022 Domestic private investors Federal Reserve Treasuries Domestic intergovernmental holdings Foreign

Because a large variety of people own the notes, bills, and bonds in the "public" portion of the debt, the Treasury also publishes information that groups the types of holders by general categories to portray who owns United States debt. In this data set, some of the public portion is moved and combined with the total government portion, because this amount is owned by the Federal Reserve as part of United States monetary policy. (See Federal Reserve System.)

As is apparent from the chart, a little less than half of the total national debt is owed to the "Federal Reserve and intragovernmental holdings". The foreign and international holders of the debt are also put together from the notes, bills, and bonds sections.

=== Foreign holdings ===
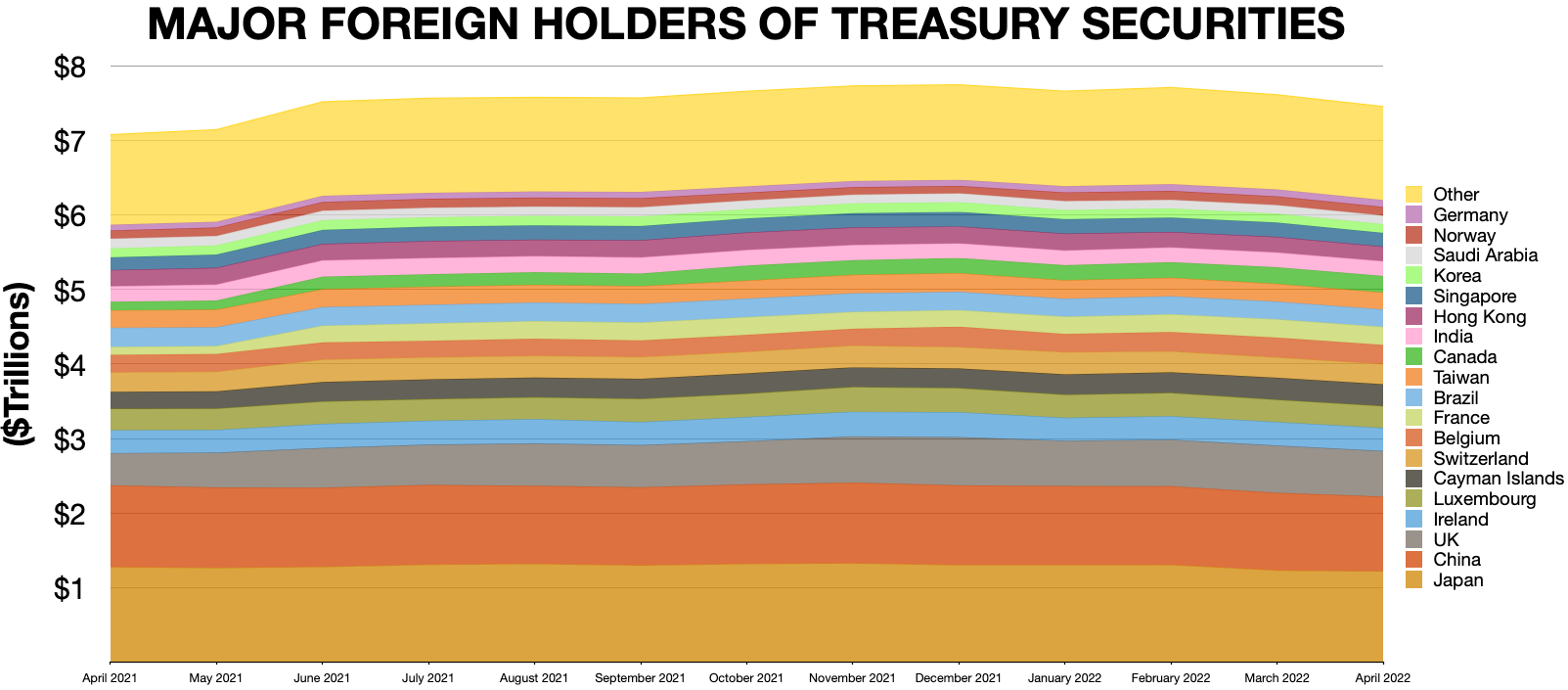
Foreign holders of Treasury Securities, April 2021 – April 2022

In October 2018, foreigners owned $6.2 trillion of U.S. debt, or approximately 39% of the debt held by the public of $16.1 trillion and 28% of the total debt of $21.8 trillion. In December 2020, foreigners held 33% ($7 trillion out of $21.6 trillion) of publicly held U.S. debt. Of this $7 trillion, $4.1 trillion (59.2%) belonged to foreign governments and $2.8 trillion (40.8%) to foreign investors. Including both private and public debt holders, the top three December 2020 national holders of American public debt were Japan ($1.2 trillion or 17.7%), China ($1.1 trillion or 15.2%), and the United Kingdom ($0.4 trillion or 6.2%).

Historically, the share held by foreign governments had grown over time, rising from 13% of the public debt in 1988 to 34% in 2015. In more recent years, foreign ownership has retreated both in percent of total debt and total dollar amounts. China's maximum holding of 9.1% or $1.3 trillion of U.S. debt occurred in 2011, reduced to 5% in 2018. Japan's maximum holding of 7% or $1.2 trillion occurred in 2012, reduced to 4% in 2018.

== Economic risks and debates ==
=== CBO risk factors ===
The CBO reported several types of risk factors related to rising debt levels in a July 2010 publication:

- A growing portion of savings would go towards purchases of government debt, rather than investments in productive capital goods such as factories and computers, leading to lower output and incomes than would otherwise occur;
- If higher marginal tax rates were used to pay rising interest costs, savings would be reduced and work would be discouraged;
- Rising interest costs would force reductions in government programs;
- Restrictions to the ability of policymakers to use fiscal policy to respond to economic challenges; and
- An increased risk of a sudden fiscal crisis, in which investors demand higher interest rates.

=== Credit default ===
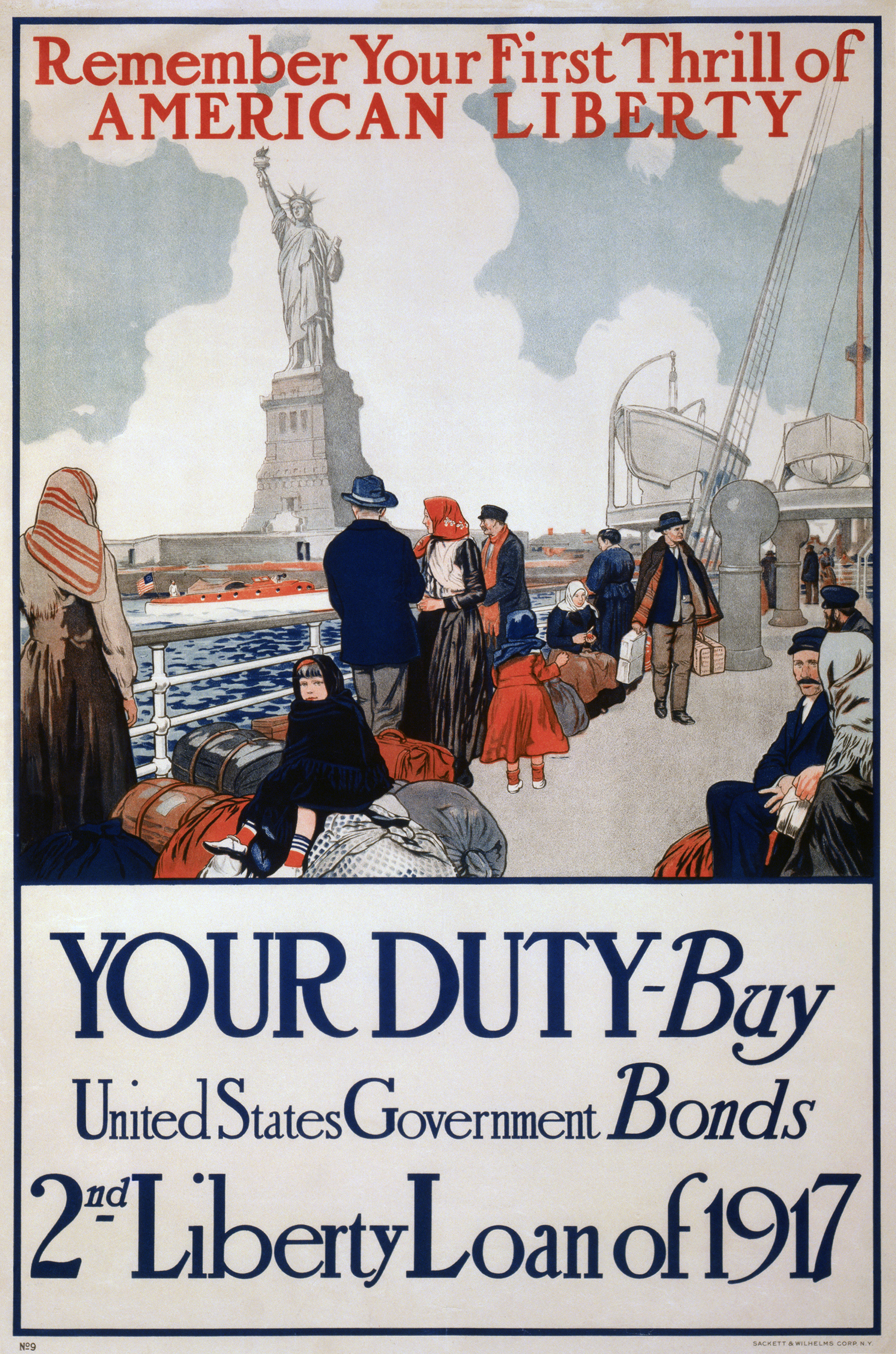
1917 poster to promote the purchase of Liberty bonds

The U.S. has never fully defaulted on its sovereign debt. The U.S. government repaid their Fourth Liberty Loan in 1918 in cash instead of gold which was viewed by some as a technical default when the nation converted from the gold standard to the U.S. dollar in 1933.

In April 1979, the U.S. may have technically defaulted on $122 million in Treasury bills, which was less than 1% of U.S. debt. The Treasury Department characterized it as a delay rather than as a default, but it did have consequences for short-term interest rates, which jumped 0.6%. Due to the processing delay, select economists view it as a temporary, partial default. The U.S. government came within 72 hours of a technical default during the 2011 American debt-ceiling crisis but averted it by raising the debt ceiling.

=== Debt ceiling ===
The United States debt ceiling is a legislative constraint on the amount of national debt that can be incurred by the U.S. Treasury. It limits how much money the federal government may pay on the debt it already has by borrowing even more money. The debt ceiling applies to almost all federal debt, including accounts owned by the public and intra-government funds for Medicare and Social Security.

=== Definition dispute of public debt ===
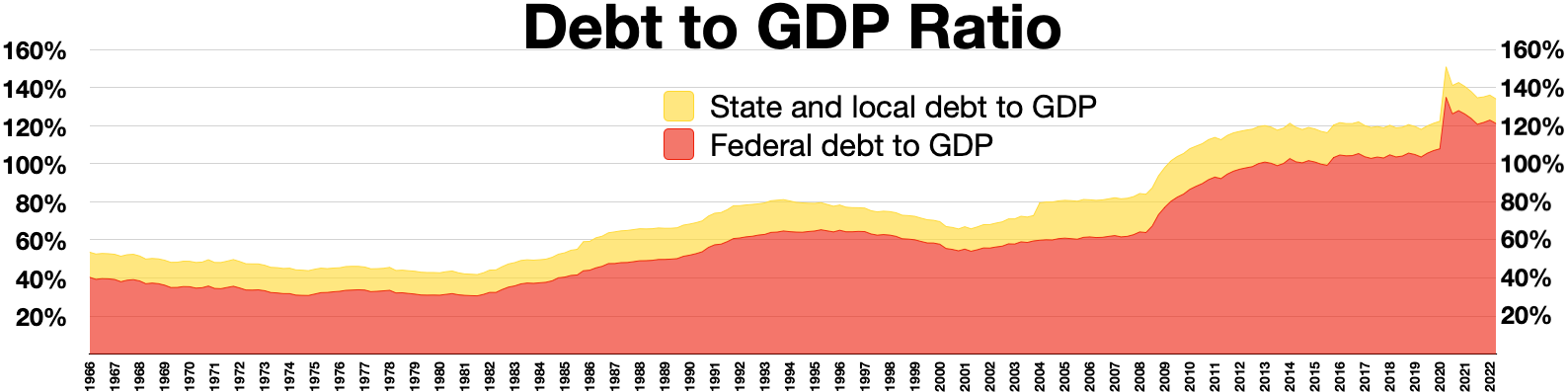
Debt to GDP, 1966 to 2022 State and local debt to GDP Federal debt to GDP

Economists also debate the definition of public debt. Krugman argued in May 2010 that the debt held by the public is the right measure to use, while Reinhart has testified to the President's Fiscal Reform Commission that gross debt is the appropriate measure. The Center on Budget and Policy Priorities (CBPP) cited research by several economists supporting the use of the lower debt held by the public figure as a more accurate measure of the debt burden, disagreeing with these Commission members.

There is debate regarding the economic nature of the intragovernmental debt, which was approximately $4.6 trillion in February 2011. For example, the CBPP argues: that "large increases in [debt held by the public] can also push up interest rates and increase the amount of future interest payments the federal government must make to lenders outside of the United States, which reduces Americans' income. By contrast, intragovernmental debt (the other component of the gross debt) has no such effects because it is simply money the federal government owes (and pays interest on) to itself."

If the U.S. government continues to run "on budget" deficits as projected by the CBO and OMB for the foreseeable future, it will have to issue marketable Treasury bills and bonds (i.e., debt held by the public) to pay for the projected shortfall in the Social Security program. This will result in "debt held by the public" replacing "intragovernmental debt".

=== Interest and debt service costs ===
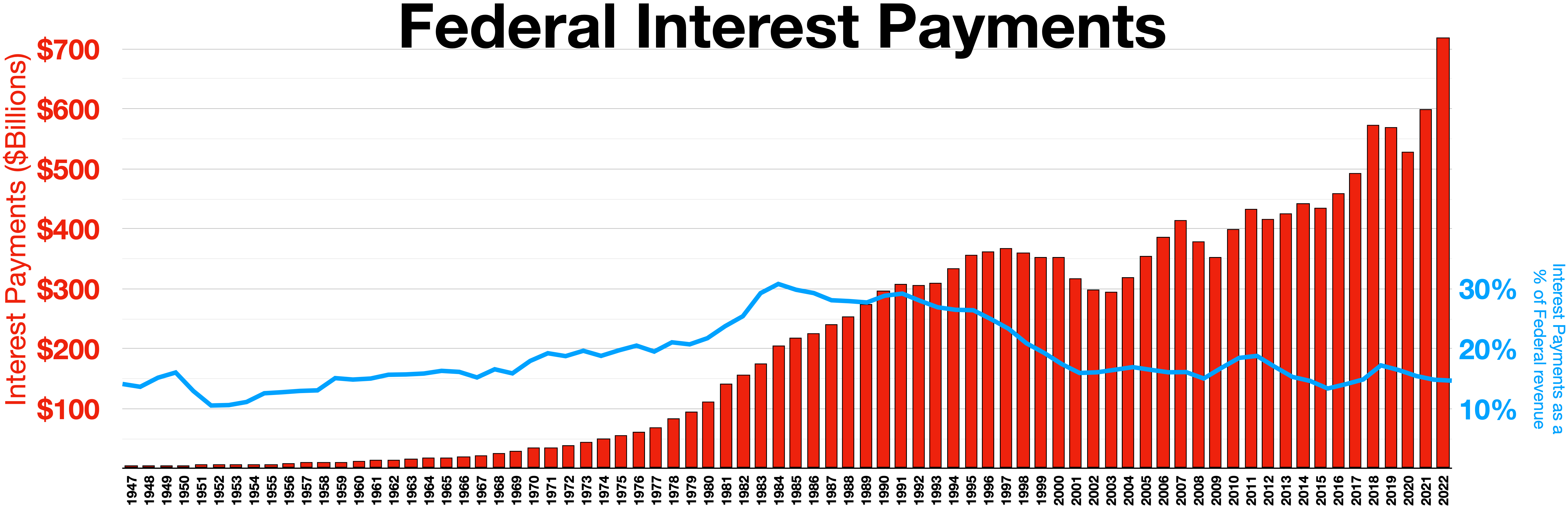
Interest on the federal debt, 1947 to 2022 Total interest payment for Fiscal year Interest payments % of total Federal revenue

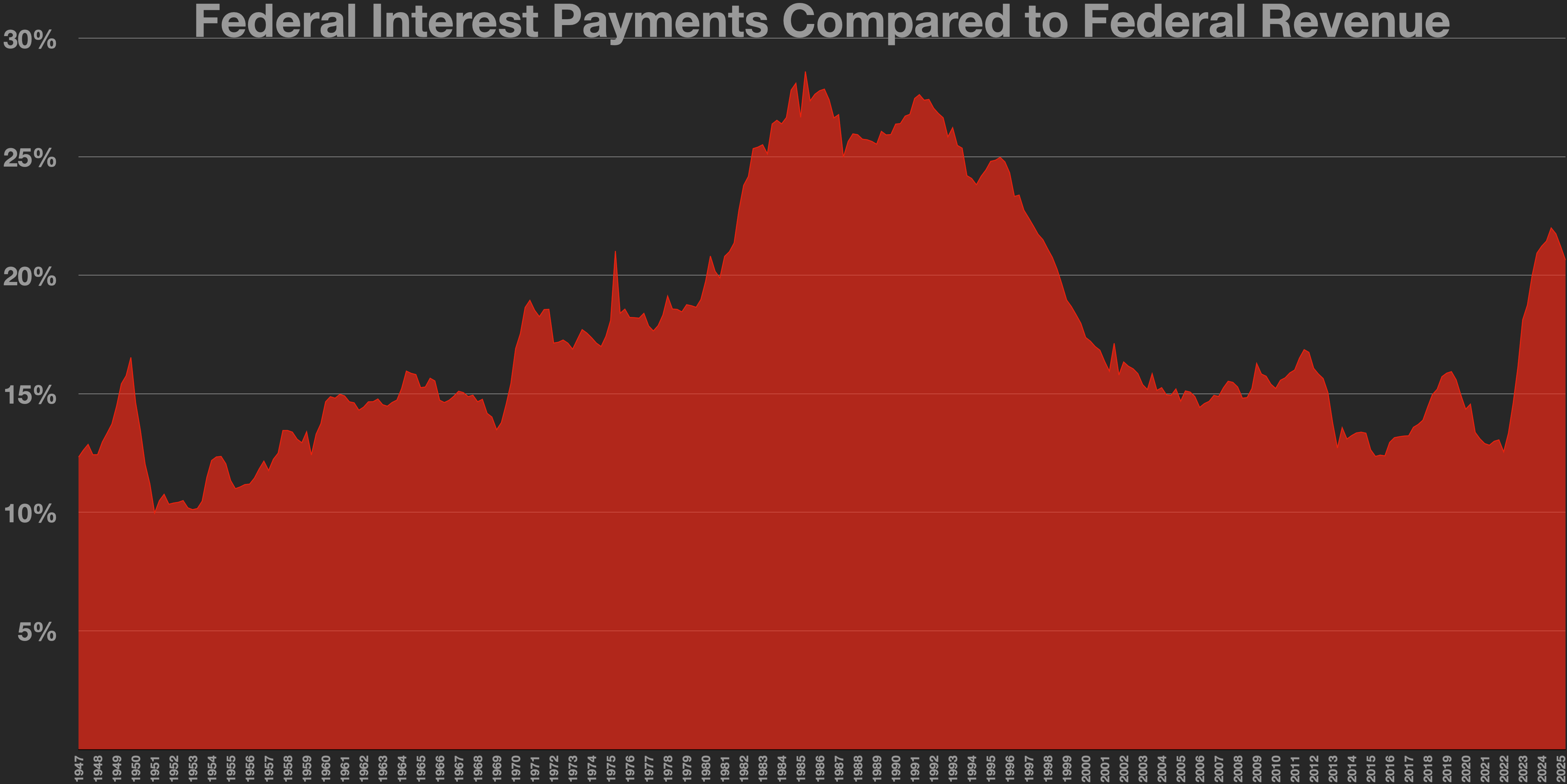
Federal interest payments compared to Federal revenue, 1947 to 2025

Interest expense on the public debt was approximately $678 billion in FY 2023. During FY 2023, the government also accrued a non-cash interest expense of $197 billion for intragovernmental debt, primarily the Social Security Trust Fund, for a total interest expense of $875 billion. This accrued interest is added to the Social Security Trust Fund and therefore the national debt each year and will be paid to Social Security recipients in the future. Since it is a non-cash expense, it is excluded from the budget deficit calculation.

The federal debt at the end of the 2018/19 fiscal year (ended September 30, 2019) was $22.7 trillion (~$28.6 trillion in 2025). The portion that is held by the public was $16.8 trillion. Neither figure includes approximately $2.5 trillion owed to the government. Interest on the debt was $404 billion.

The cost of servicing the U.S. national debt can be measured in various ways. The CBO analyzes net annual interest as a percentage of GDP, with a higher percentage indicating a higher interest payment burden. During 2015, this was 1.3% GDP, close to the record low 1.2% of the 1966–1968 era. The average from 1966 to 2015 was 2.0% of GDP.

The CBO estimated in 2016 that the interest amounts and % GDP will increase significantly over the following decade as both interest rates and debt levels rise: "Interest payments on that debt represent a large and rapidly growing expense of the federal government. CBO's baseline shows net interest payments more than tripling under current law, climbing from $231 billion in 2014, or 1.3% of GDP, to $799 billion in 2024, or 3.0% of GDP—the highest ratio since 1996."

In 2018, the Committee for a Responsible Federal Budget (CRFB) estimated that the U.S. government will spend more on servicing its debts than it does for national defense by 2024.

In October 2023, yields for 10-year Treasury notes breached 5% as traders adjusted their assessment of the United States' fiscal position and lowered their expectation that Congress or the White House would take action to improve it. The impact was felt by homebuyers, with the 30-year mortgage rate at its highest in two decades, and corporations facing higher costs of borrowing. Interest paid by the federal government jumped by $184 billion during the 2022 fiscal year and is still climbing.

=== Intergenerational equity ===
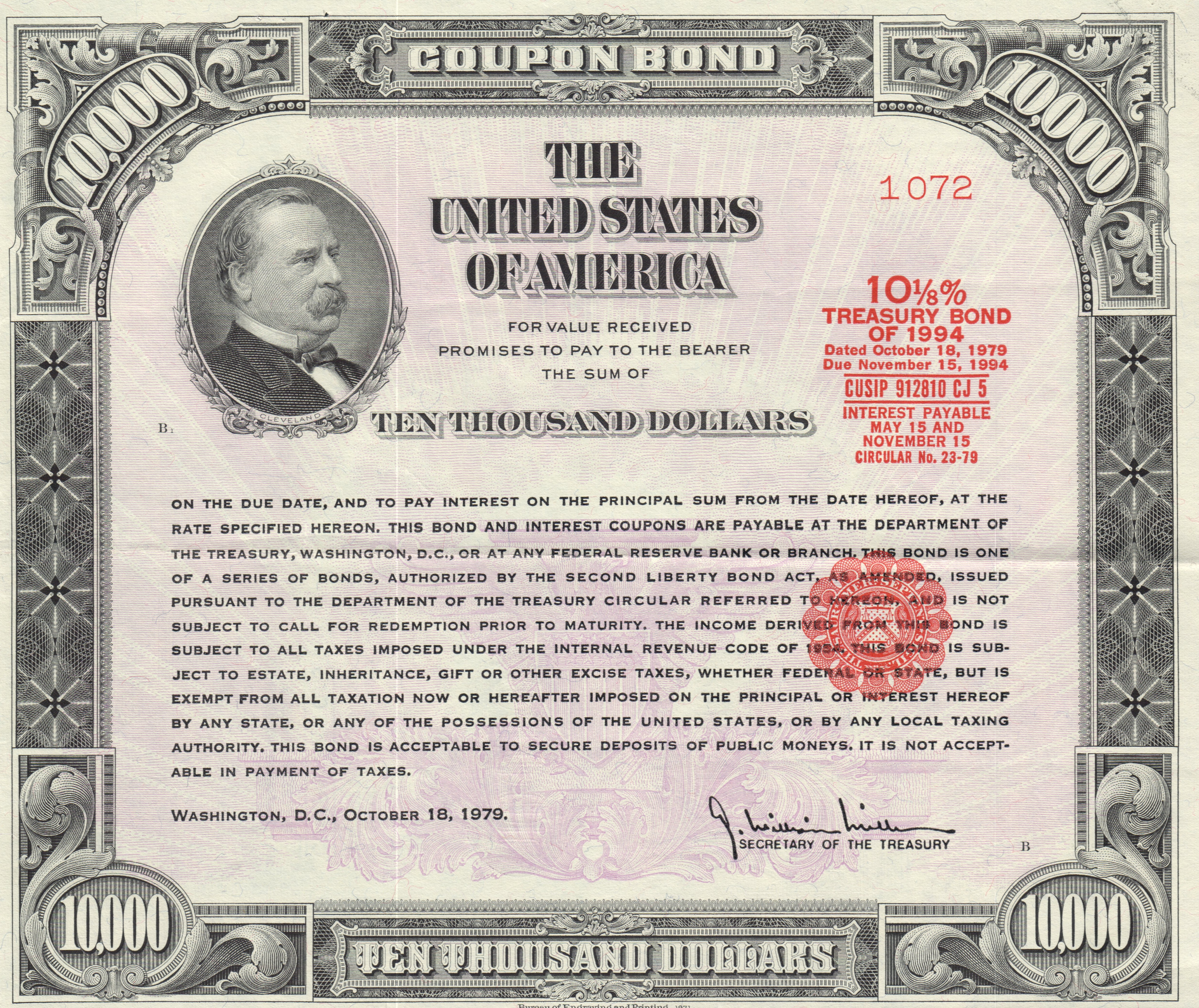
A 1979 $10,000 U.S. Treasury Bond

One debate about the national debt relates to intergenerational equity. For example, if one generation is receiving the benefit of government programs or employment enabled by deficit spending and debt accumulation, to what extent does the resulting higher debt impose risks and costs on future generations? There are several factors to consider:

- For every dollar of debt held by the public, there is a government obligation (generally marketable Treasury securities) counted as an asset by investors. Future generations benefit to the extent these assets are passed on to them.
- As of 2010, approximately 72% of the financial assets were held by the wealthiest 5% of the population. This presents a wealth and income distribution question, as only a fraction of the people in future generations will receive principal or interest from investments related to the debt incurred today.
- To the extent the U.S. debt is owed to foreign investors (approximately half the "debt held by the public" during 2012), principal and interest are not directly received by U.S. heirs.
- Higher debt levels imply higher interest payments, which create costs for future taxpayers (e.g., higher taxes, lower government benefits, higher inflation, or increased risk of fiscal crisis).
- To the extent the borrowed funds are invested today to improve the long-term productivity of the economy and its workers, such as via useful infrastructure projects or education, future generations may benefit.
- For every dollar of intragovernmental debt, there is an obligation to specific program recipients, generally non-marketable securities such as those held in the Social Security Trust Fund. Adjustments that reduce future deficits in these programs may also apply costs to future generations, via higher taxes or lower program spending.

=== Military implications ===
In 2011, in Debt: The First 5,000 Years, left-wing anthropology professor David Graeber argued the purchasing of U.S. treasury bonds by other countries makes them "to some degree beholden to U.S. interests, rather than the other way around" because the U.S. gains hard power in the transaction by spending their loan money on maintaining their hundreds of military bases throughout the world. Graeber compared this process with empires throughout history demanding tributes from subject countries to fuel military conquests, saying the only difference is that the U.S. uses implied threats to pressure the subject country into giving loans and that by using the language of debt, the U.S. falsely appears to be the lesser power in the transaction. Graeber argued if the U.S. were to lose its superpower status, the hard power threat underpinning the loans would be gone which would cause countries to distance themselves from U.S. treasury bonds and possibly demand full loan repayments militarily.

=== National security implications ===
According to a 2013 Forbes article, many American and other economic analysts have expressed concerns on the amount of United States government debt the People's Republic of China is holding as part of their reserves. The National Defense Authorization Act of FY 2012 included a provision requiring the Secretary of Defense to conduct a "national security risk assessment of U.S. federal debt held by China." The department issued its report in July 2012, stating that "attempting to use U.S. Treasury securities as a coercive tool would have limited effect and likely would do more harm to China than to the United States." An August 19, 2013 Congressional Research Service report said that the threat is not credible and the effect would be limited even if carried out. The report said that the threat would not offer "China deterrence options, whether in the diplomatic, military, or economic realms, and this would remain true both in peacetime and in scenarios of crisis or war."

A 2010 article by James K. Galbraith in The Nation, defends deficits and dismisses concerns over foreign holdings of United States government debt denominated in U.S. dollars, including China's holdings. In 2010, Warren Mosler, wrote that "When[ever] the Chinese redeem those T-securities, the money is transferred back to China's checking account at the Fed. During the entire purchase and redemption process, the dollars never leave the Fed." Australian economist Bill Mitchell argued that the United States government had a "nearly infinite capacity...to spend."

In 2020, against the backdrop of escalating Sino-U.S. tensions, Yuzo Sakai, a manager at Ueda Totan Forex Ltd., said that if China undertakes a massive sales of U.S. bonds, investors may flock to the Japanese yen as a safe-haven currency. Since 2018, China had been gradually decreasing its holdings of U.S. federal debt, bringing the total to $1.07 trillion in June 2020, behind Japan who became the biggest foreign creditor of the United States. Stephen Nagy, a professor at the International Christian University, said a sell-off by China "might damage the United States in the short term" but also cause "critical economic instability" in the Chinese and global economy. Jeff Kingston, a professor and director of Asian Studies at Temple University, Japan, echoed the view, adding that dumping would lower the price of U.S. bonds, making it more attractive to other countries. According to an institutional investor, however, it may be difficult for Japan to boost its already large holdings of U.S. government debt, as such a move could be seen as "currency manipulation".

Responding to Donald Trump's argument for a $500 billion increase in defense spending in 2026, Romina Boccia of the Cato Institute remarked that the Congressional Budget Office had already projected debt to rise to "fiscally dangerous levels" in the following decades. She noted, "Excessive debt slows economic growth, reduces income levels, raises interest rates, and constrains funding for core government functions, like national defense. ...financing a larger military by borrowing yet more, when interest costs on the existing debt already exceed what the nation spends on defense, becomes fiscally untenable."

=== Risks to economic growth ===
Debt levels may affect economic growth rates. In 2010, economists Kenneth Rogoff and Carmen Reinhart reported that among the 20 developed countries studied, average annual GDP growth was 3–4% when debt was relatively moderate or low (i.e., under 0.60 times GDP), but it dips to just 1.6% when debt was high (i.e., above 0.90 times GDP). In April 2013, the conclusions of Rogoff and Reinhart's study came into question when a coding error in their original paper was discovered by Herndon, Ash and Pollin of the University of Massachusetts Amherst.

Herndon, Ash and Pollin found that after correcting for errors and unorthodox methods used, there was no evidence that debt above a specific threshold reduces growth. Reinhart and Rogoff maintain that after correcting for errors, a negative relationship between high debt and growth remains. Other economists, including Paul Krugman, have argued that it is low growth which causes national debt to increase, rather than the other way around.

Commenting on fiscal sustainability, former Federal Reserve Chairman Ben Bernanke stated in April 2010 that "Neither experience nor economic theory clearly indicates the threshold at which government debt begins to endanger prosperity and economic stability. But given the significant costs and risks associated with a rapidly rising federal debt, our nation should soon put in place a credible plan for reducing deficits to sustainable levels over time."

== Appendix ==
=== Historic national debt levels ===
The following table outlines historical levels of total and publicly-held debt as compared to the United States economy:

Fiscal year	Total debt, $bn	Total debt to GDP ratio	Public debt, $bn	Public debt to GDP ratio	GDP, $bn BEA/OMB
1910	2.65	0.081	2.65	0.081	32.8
1920	25.95	0.292	25.95	0.292	88.6
1927	18.51	0.192	18.51	0.192	96.5
1930	16.19	0.166	16.19	0.166	97.4
1940	42.97	0.438	42.77	0.436	98.2
1950	257.3	0.920	219.00	0.784	279.0
1960	286.3	0.536	236.80	0.443	535.1
1970	370.9	0.350	283.20	0.270	1,061
1980	907.7	0.324	711.90	0.255	2,792
1990	3,233	0.544	2,400	0.408	5,899
2000	5,659	0.559	3,450	0.339	10,150
2001	5,792	0.550	3,350	0.316	10,550
2002	6,213	0.574	3,550	0.327	10,800
2003	6,783	0.601	3,900	0.346	11,300
2004	7,379	0.613	4,300	0.356	12,050
2005	7,918	0.617	4,600	0.357	12,850
2006	8,493	0.623	4,850	0.354	13,650
2007	8,993	0.629	5,050	0.353	14,300
2008	10,011	0.677	5,800	0.394	14,800
2009	11,898	0.822	7,550	0.524	14,450
2010	13,551	0.910	9,000	0.610	14,900
2011	14,781	0.956	10,150	0.658	15,450
2012	16,059	0.997	11,250	0.703	16,100
2013	16,732	1.004	12,000	0.718	16,650
2014	17,810	1.025	12,800	0.728	17,350
2015	18,138	1.003	13,124	0.743	18,100
2016	19,560	1.055	14,173	0.756	18,550
2017	20,233	1.051	14,673	0.739	19,250
2018	21,506	1.060	15,761	0.770	20,300
2019	22,711	1.074	16,809	0.783	21,150
2020	26,938	1.280	21,040	0.980	21,050
2021	29,600	1.240	22,310	0.933	23,745
2022	31,400	1.200	24,320	0.916	26,059
2023	34,000	1.190	26,350	0.947	27,825
2024	36,000	1.210	28,300	0.964	29,380
2025	38,500	1.230	30,300	0.981	30,861

=== Historic interest paid ===
The following table outlines historical interest paid on U.S. debt since 1991:

Fiscal; Year	total debt, $billions	Interest paid $billions	Interest rate
2025	38,500	1,024	3.42%
2024	36,000	1,020	3.32%
2023	34,000	879.0	2.97%
2022	31,400	717.0	2.07%
2021	29,600	352.0	1.65%
2020	26,938	345.0	1.97%
2019	22,719	574.6	2.53%
2018	21,516	523.0	2.43%
2017	20,244	458.5	2.26%
2016	19,573	432.6	2.21%
2015	18,150	402.4	2.22%
2014	17,824	430.8	2.42%
2013	16,738	415.7	2.48%
2012	16,066	359.8	2.24%
2011	14,790	454.4	3.07%
2010	13,562	414.0	3.05%
2009	11,910	383.1	3.22%
2008	10,025	451.2	4.50%
2007	9,008	430.0	4.77%
2006	8,507	405.9	4.77%
2005	7,933	352.4	4.44%
2004	7,379	321.6	4.36%
2003	6,783	318.1	4.69%
2002	6,228	332.5	5.34%
2001	5,807	359.5	6.19%
2000	5,674	362.0	6.38%
1999	5,656	353.5	6.25%
1998	5,526	363.8	6.58%
1997	5,413	355.8	6.57%
1996	5,225	344.0	6.58%
1995	4,974	332.4	6.68%
1994	4,693	296.3	6.31%
1993	4,411	292.5	6.63%
1992	4,065	292.4	7.19%
1991	3,665	286.0	7.80%

=== Foreign holders of U.S. Treasury securities ===
The following is a list of the top foreign holders of Treasury securities as listed by the Federal Reserve Board:

Leading foreign holders of U.S. Treasury securities as of September 2026
Country or region	USD$ billion	% change since September 2025
Japan	1,063.1	−11%
United Kingdom	985.8	+14%
China	563.9	−19%
Belgium	507.9	+10%
Cayman Islands	486.8	+14%
Canada	467.7	− 2%
Luxembourg	445.0	+ 6%
Ireland	344.8	+ 1%
France	332.0	−12%
Taiwan	290.9	− 7%
Switzerland	289.0	− 4%
Singapore	274.5	+ 6%
Hong Kong	249.2	+ 4%
India	228.2	+13%
Norway	209.4	− 3%
others	2,503.2	+ 2%
Total	9,241.2	+ 0%

== See also ==
- Financial position of the United States
- List of U.S. state budgets
- List of countries by government debt
- United States federal government credit-rating downgrades
