= William Kingston (disambiguation) =

William Kingston (c. 1476–1540) was constable of the Tower of London during the reign of Henry VIII.

William Kingston may also refer to:

- William Henry Giles Kingston (1814–1880), writer of tales for boys
- William Kingston (cricketer) (1874–1956), English cricketer for Northamptonshire

== See also ==
- William Kingston Flesher (1825–1907), Canadian businessman and political figure
- William Kingston Vickery (1851–1925), Irish-American art dealer
