= Latter Day Church of Christ =

Latter-Day Saints denomination

- Classification: Restorationist
- Orientation: Latter Day Saint movement
- Theology: Mormon fundamentalism
- Polity: Hierarchical
- Trustee in Trust (Leader): Paul Elden Kingston
- Associations: Davis County Cooperative Society Inc.
- Headquarters: West Valley City, Utah, U.S.
- Founder: Ortell Kingston (Elden Kingston was founder of the Davis County Cooperative Society)
- Origin: January 1, 1935; 91 years ago Bountiful, Utah, U.S.
- Members: 7500 (2019 estimate)

The Latter Day Church of Christ (LDCC) or Davis County Cooperative Society (DCCS) is a Mormon fundamentalist denomination within the Latter Day Saint movement. The DCCS was established in 1935 by Elden Kingston, son of Charles W. Kingston, and in 1977 members of the DCCS organized the Latter Day Church of Christ. Media outlets often refer to the organization as the Kingston Group, and internally it is known as "the Order" or "the Co-op".

There are approximately 7,500 members (2019 estimate), some of whom are known to practice polygamy. The current leader is Paul Elden Kingston.

== Establishment ==
Historians and other scholars who have studied the group have identified several doctrinal and socio-economic factors leading to its establishment. These factors originated in the family of Elden Kingston, his father Charles Kingston, and other family members or closely-affiliated people, many of whom were originally members of the Church of Jesus Christ of Latter-day Saints (LDS Church). Doctrinally, they fell away from the Church on the issues of the consecration of wealth, tithing of gross income vs net surplus, and plural marriage.

According to his autobiography, Charles W. Kingston became disenchanted with the LDS Church in 1926 because it abandoned plural marriage. Kingston began preaching polygamy amongst fellow members of the LDS Church and distributing pamphlets and the book he had co-written, Laman Manasseh Victorious: A Message of Salvation and Redemption to His People Israel, First to Ephraim and Manasseh. This resulted in his excommunication from the LDS Church in 1928.

Charles W. Kingston eventually converted his son Elden to his beliefs and on January 1, 1935, Elden along with his two wives, Ethel Gustafson and Afton Brown took steps to officially begin the cooperative in Bountiful, Utah. From 1935 to 1940, Elden Kingston's followers, including his father Charles W. Kingston, began to move to Bountiful, Utah, intending to live under a United Order communal program as defined by Joseph Smith in the Doctrine and Covenants.

On September 19, 1941, the community founded by Elden Kingston officially filed for recognition with the State of Utah as the Davis County Cooperative Society Inc. The corporation produces goods and services that are used by members, and sold or traded to other cooperatives and to the public. In 1977, Elden's brother Ortell Kingston began to file for legal recognition of the church later organized as The Latter Day Church of Christ.

The Latter Day Church of Christ is based in Salt Lake City, Utah, with a presence in Bountiful, Utah.

== Business activities ==
The organization owns an extensive portfolio of business and land assets throughout the western United States, including a 300-acre (1.2 km^{2}) dairy farm in Davis County; a 3,200-acre (13 km^{2}) farm in Tetonia, Idaho; a coal mine in Emery County; 1,200 acres (4.9 km^{2}) in Terreton, Idaho; discount and grocery stores; Desert Tech Firearms; and a restaurant supply company. A 2004 estimate put the value of these assets at more than $200 million, while ethnographer Janet Bennion estimated a value of $150 million in 2011.

The organization is tight-lipped about their business activities. Some of their secrecy might be attributed to a fear of arrest for living in plural marriages, as had happened in 1957–1960 when being investigated by the Davis County Grand Jury, which some members claimed was organized by LDS Apostles Mark E. Peterson and Spencer W. Kimball. The Grand Jury was described as "The polygamist hunting Davis County Grand Jury" by the Ogden Standard-Examiner in 1959. That same year, Ardous Kingston Gustafson, a mother of four and founding Co-op member, was jailed on Christmas Eve when she could not produce membership lists used to further the court's investigation into charges of cohabitation.

The Cooperative had its birth during the Great Depression when many families struggled immensely to provide for their families. For many years, members of the Cooperative lived in poor conditions, and had no legal way to apply for assistance.

Long-time leader John Ortell Kingston lived in a small one-story clapboard house in Salt Lake City up until the time of his death in 1987. J. Ortell Kingston aggressively pursued a financially-expansive agenda for the Davis County Cooperative Society in the hopes of improving the financial condition of his followers.

Since the mid-1990s, many members have become college-educated and live in middle-to-upper-middle-class homes throughout their communities. Currently the group claims that although different skillsets bring different financial outcomes, there is no homelessness within the DCCS, and internal programs exist for those experiencing financial poverty.

== Beliefs ==
The Latter Day Church of Christ is not affiliated with the mainstream LDS Church. Doctrinally, members of the LDCC try to adhere to the teachings of the Bible, the Book of Mormon, the Doctrine and Covenants, and the Pearl of Great Price. Members of the Latter Day Church of Christ are also members of the Davis County Cooperative Society (a separate organization and legal entity) which practices the law of consecration and United Order. Some members had begun the practice of plural marriage years before the establishment of the cooperative.

During the first years of the Davis County Cooperative Society, Elden Kingston and his followers wore unique blue denim outer garments that led to people referring to them as "blue-coats." Men and boys wore blue coverall-type suits tied with strings; women and girls wore plain blue denim dresses. As a symbol of their renunciation of worldly goods, the outer clothing contained no pockets in which possessions could be carried, although later an inside pocket was provided for the sanitary measure of carrying a handkerchief. All went bareheaded and barefoot, although this practice was discontinued in the early 1940's.

According to a 2011 document prepared by attorneys general Mark Shurtleff and Tom Horne, members of the DCCS describe it as emphasizing family values, education, self-sufficiency, and the belief that every child is a priceless blessing. Children are allowed to attend public school and many go on to college. Former members leaving the group in the 1980s and 1990s allege that some were paid in "units" instead of money and that many of their life decisions were made for them. Some members also claim there is an "inner circle" who are entitled to more wives and better jobs.

In 2016, some members of the LDCC helped start Vanguard Academy charter school in West Valley, which continues to operate today. Many high school aged children from the LDCC are believed to attend the school.

The group is designated by the Southern Poverty Law Center as a hate group under the category of general hate.

== Controversies ==
=== Consanguineous marriages ===
After two decades of raids from law enforcement from 1935 to 1957, it is believed some members of the church began to practice consanguineous marriage between relatives. This practice has been attributed to "endogamous preference and the small size of the group's population" according to active members and research from Santa Clara University. The group claims no preference for any particular family or surname stating members join every year "from a variety of different backgrounds and surnames."

In the late 1990s, three members of the LDCJC faced scrutiny for entering into incestuous relationships.

These cases included:

- Jason Kingston had a relationship with his half-sister Andrea Johnson, who became pregnant in 1992. She suffered from preeclampsia before being brought in for medical treatment. A C-section was performed to save the baby, but Andrea died. Salt Lake County officials opened an investigation into the possibility that obstetrical care was withheld to conceal the relationship.
- Jeremy Kingston was sentenced to a year in prison in 2004 for entering a relationship with LuAnn Kingston, his cousin and aunt, as his fourth wife in 1994; their relationship began when he was 24 and she was 15.
- David Kingston married his 16-year-old niece Mary Ann Nelson as his 15th wife in 1997. She attempted to run away but was apprehended and beaten by her father, John Daniel Kingston. He was arrested and pleaded "no contest" to the charge of child abuse and served seven months in jail. David Kingston was convicted of incest and unlawful sexual conduct and sentenced to a 10-year prison term, of which he served four years. Mary Ann later filed a $110-million lawsuit against other members of the Cooperative, alleging intentional sexual abuse of a child and intentional infliction of emotional distress, but the lawsuit was eventually dropped without any settlement.

These relationships are defined as incestuous according to Utah's Criminal Code 76-7-102 (2021).

Kathrine Nichols, a granddaughter of Paul Elden Kingston, filed a federal lawsuit in January 2025 against the church, the Davis County Cooperative, her parents, grandparents, great-uncle, as well as her ex-husband who is also her uncle and cousin. Nichols alleges that they "brainwashed and coerced her into an underage, abusive and bigamous marriage to her uncle".

=== Underaged marriage ===
Members of the LDCC have faced two lawsuits, one in 2006 and one in 2022 accusing members of sexual abuses and underaged marriages. The 2022 complaint was filed by attorney and TV producer Roger Hoole. In 2009, the then-Attorney General of Utah, Mark Shurtleff, claimed that child marriages within polygamous societies in Utah, such as the Latter Day Church of Christ, had "effectively stopped". The latest suit takes issue with alleged marriages as young as 16 within the Latter Day Church of Christ. Current Utah law allows individuals 16 and 17 years of age to marry with court approval. In February 2023, the 2022 lawsuit was voluntarily dismissed in State Court with attorneys for the plaintiffs promising to re-file a similar case in Federal Court. Attorney Roger Hoole re-filed a similar case in federal court in March 2024 alleging racketeering in addition to some of the same allegations in the previously dismissed lawsuit from State Court.

The LDCC continues to publicly denounce the practice of child marriage, and maintains that marriages within the group are not coerced. Plural marriage is practiced by some members of the LDCJC and "members are free to choose their marriage partner or partners, as marriage is considered an individual's or family's personal choice," according to author Craig Foster in his book American Polygamy (2019). In a civil suit seeking a monetary settlement, some ex-members dispute these claims. In 2007, the group told Deseret News that it was encouraging its members to wait until their partners were 18 to marry them, with one member reporting that "we do encourage them to be 18". Responding to child marriage allegations in September 2022, the organization told The Guardian that "current policy prohibits plural marriage for members under 18" and "once an individual has made a decision on who to marry, members are encouraged to seek the blessing of their parents, family and/or church leaders, but to say that one individual chooses or heavily influences who will marry who is entirely inaccurate".

=== Financial fraud ===
In 2016, the State of Utah with federal law enforcement raided various properties in connection with the Kingston family or Davis County Cooperative Society with the intention of finding welfare fraud. The State of Utah stated: "It was a specific investigation that we were approached by [federal law enforcement] to participate in." After two years of investigating, they did not find any welfare fraud. "State investigators found no wrongdoing among members of the Davis County Cooperative Society, also known as the Kingston Group." Members claim they have been broadly and unfairly targeted by authorities for the negative actions of a small few. Members allege to have been targeted for audit at a rate over nine times the published IRS average for the general population, with no pattern of fraud being found outside of a couple of bad-actors.

In July 2019, Jacob Kingston, Isaiah Kingston, and two others pled guilty to participating in a fraud scheme masterminded by Lev Dermen, a non-member and Armenian national. The scheme included filing for $512 million in federal renewable-fuel tax credits from 2010 to 2016 through a company named Washakie Renewable Energy LLC. One of the guilty pleas states they "cycled" fraud proceeds through a number of international partners and then back to Washakie's bank accounts, falsely claiming them as loans or profits. A small portion of the funds (less than 6%) were also used to purchase legitimate goods and services from businesses who provided them in "good faith". Legitimate businesses, including those in the Cooperative, argued that Jacob hid the scheme from business partners as well as Co-op leadership. The remainder of the transactions (over 94%) were to entities associated with Lev Dermen, who prosecutors allege was the mastermind of the scheme. Dermen was found guilty of masterminding the scheme in March 2020. As part of the plea deal and restitution, the company forfeits rights to a number of assets including their bio-fuel plant in Plymouth, Utah. WRE has since become defunct.

Davis County Cooperative leadership and members swiftly condemned the fraudulent behavior stating that "[Jacob] broke from tradition in many ways" and stressing "to members and non-members alike that this behavior is not in line with our beliefs or principles." And, "We cannot and will not condone or support anyone found to be engaged in any fraudulent behaviors." In a recent lawsuit, ex-members allege that the WRE case was an example of the concept of "bleeding the beast." However, the group reiterated its belief that "bleeding the beast" was "abhorent" and was "never a tenet" of its organization.

In April 2023 four members of the group were sentenced to federal prison. Jacob Kingston received 18 years, his brother Isaiah 14 years, their mother Rachel Kingston 7 years and Jacobs wife Sally Kingston 6 years. Both Jacob and his brother Isaiah Kingston are sons of John Daniel Kingston. Lev Dermen was sentenced to 40 years.

=== Political donations ===
Companies and individuals affiliated with the sect donated to several Utah politicians. For example, Republican Sean Reyes (Utah Attorney General from 2013 to 2025) received $40,000 in campaign donations from Washakie Renewable Energies, a company run by Jacob Kingston, and another $10,000 from his wife, Sally Kingston. The company also donated $25,000 to the Utah Republican Party and was among the sponsors of the annual Governors Gala Utah, a fundraising event hosted by Republican Gary R. Herbert, the then-governor of Utah.

=== Environmental pollution ===
In 2019 a company owned by the Kingston family was fined $27,519 for intentionally polluting storm drains and main surface waters that feed the Great Salt Lake by illegally dumping chemicals into them. American Chemical LLC was located in Portage, Utah on the site of Washakie. According to paperwork from an inspection in 2022 caustic/phosphoric acid that according to the company was stored inside a building was found to be actually stored outside. The company was shut down in 2024.

The companies agent is Jeremiah Daniel Kingston who was charged in 2019 for starving 46 cows to death.

== Notable members ==
=== Leaders ===
- Paul Elden Kingston, (1987–current)
- John Ortell Kingston (1948–87)
- Elden Kingston (1935–48)
- Charles W. Kingston (founder's father, patriarch, supported leaders from 1935 until his death in 1975)

=== Members ===
Nick Young is the CEO of Desert Tech, a rifle manufacturer and has published pictures where he is seen shooting guns with Donald Trump Jr.

== See also ==
- List of Mormon fundamentalist churches
- List of Mormon fundamentalist leaders
- Kay's Cross
- Mormonism and polygamy

== Works cited ==
- Bennion, Janet (2012). Polygamy in Primetime: Media, Gender, and Politics in Mormon Fundamentalism. Brandeis University Press. ISBN 978-1-61168-296-0.
- Cook, Amy Osmond (2011). Why They Believe: A Case Study in Contemporary Polygamy. San Clemente, CA: Sourced Media Books. ISBN 978-1-937458-32-4.
- Foster, Craig L.; Watson, Marianne T. (2019). American Polygamy: A History of Fundamentalist Mormon Faith. Charleston, SC: The History Press. ISBN 978-1-43966-703-3.
