= Hubert Kingston =

English cricketer

Personal information
- Full name: Hubert Ernest Kingston
- Born: 15 August 1876; Northampton, Northamptonshire, England
- Died: 9 June 1955 (aged 78); Long Buckby, Northamptonshire, England
- Batting: Right-handed
- Bowling: Leg break
- Relatives: Charles Kingston (brother); Frederick Kingston (brother); James Kingston (brother); William Kingston (brother)

Domestic team information
- Years: Team
- 1895–1906: Northamptonshire

Career statistics
Competition	First-class
Matches	13
Runs scored	335
Batting average	15.95
100s/50s	–/1
Top score	68
Balls bowled	299
Wickets	6
Bowling average	41.00
5 wickets in innings	–
10 wickets in match	–
Best bowling	2/8
Catches/stumpings	7/–
- Source: Cricinfo, 21 October 2012

Hubert Ernest Kingston (15 August 1876 – 9 June 1955) was an English cricketer. Kingston was a right-handed batsman who bowled leg break. He was born at Northampton, Northamptonshire, and was educated at Blair Lodge School in Scotland.

Kingston made his debut for Northamptonshire against Staffordshire in the 1895 Minor Counties Championship. He played minor counties cricket for Northamptonshire for the next decade, making a total of 57 appearances. Having won the 1903 and 1904 Minor Counties Championship, Northamptonshire were granted first-class status for the 1905 season, allowing them to take part in the County Championship. He made his first-class debut in Northamptonshire's inaugural first-class fixture against Hampshire at the County Ground, Southampton. He made twelve further first-class appearances for the county, the last of which came in the 1906 County Championship against Nottinghamshire. In his thirteen first-class matches, he scored 335 runs at an average of 15.95, with a high score of 68. This score was his only half century and came on debut against Hampshire. With the ball, he took 6 wickets at a bowling average of 41.00, with best figures of 2/8.

He died at Long Buckby, Northamptonshire, on 9 June 1955. His brothers, Charles, Frederick, James and William, all played first-class cricket.
