= Kay's Cross =

Large stone cross in Kaysville, Utah

- Kay's Cross in 2010
- Interactive map of Kay's Cross
- Location: Kaysville, Utah, US
- Nearest city: Layton
- Coordinates: 41°03′02.67″N 111°55′31.25″W
- Elevation: 4,350 ft (1,330 m)
- Established: 1946 (partially destroyed February 15, 1992)
- Visitors: Seasonal
- Governing body: Private
- Website: Kay's Cross Haunted Tours

Kay's Cross was a large stone cross located in Kaysville, Utah, in a secluded area known as Kay's Hollow. It has been associated with local legends and folklore. In 1992, the structure was partially destroyed by an unexplained explosion. Despite this, the site continues to attract visitors interested in its history and folklore.

== History ==
Prior to its destruction, Kay's Cross was a large stone structure, approximately 20 feet (6.1 m) tall and 13 feet (4.0 m) wide.

The origins of Kay's Cross remain uncertain, with multiple theories proposed. One prominent theory suggests the cross was constructed in 1946 by members of the Kingston family, a polygamous group led by Charles Elden Kingston, who founded the Davis County Cooperative Society. The Kingstons, often referred to as "The Order," are a fundamentalist offshoot of the LDS Church and own the land where Kay's Cross was built.

Another theory connects the cross to Krishna Venta, a self-proclaimed reincarnation of Jesus Christ. Venta, born Francis Pencovic, was a religious leader based in California who reportedly had ties to Utah. According to a 1992 interview with Merlin Kingston reported by the Deseret News, the cross was built in honor of Venta using plans Venta himself had drawn. While Merlin claimed the "K" on the cross stood for "Kingdom," a journal belonging to Malvern Hansen (another descendant of the family) states that the "K" represented "Knowledge." The design included grooves meant to hold religious texts, which were intended to be covered by stained glass. However, the project was abandoned when Venta left Utah to establish his movement in California. Venta was later killed in a bombing orchestrated by two of his followers in 1958.

On February 15, 1992, approximately 80 pounds (36 kg) of dynamite was ignited at the base of the cross. The subsequent explosion caused extensive damage, scattering debris in the surrounding area. The culprit remains unknown, with theories ranging from vandalism to intentional destruction by landowners or local authorities aiming to discourage trespassing and rumored occult activities.

A suicide was reportedly committed in 2005 on the property directly adjacent to the cross.

== Myths and legends ==
Kay's Cross has been the subject of numerous legends, many involving alleged supernatural occurrences. One story claims it was built by an unnamed polygamist who allegedly murdered his wives and buried them around its base. Another version of this tale suggests the body or heart of his seventh wife was encased within the top arm of the stone cross.

In the 1980s, amidst the Satanic panic in Utah, rumors surfaced that the site was used for ritual sacrifice. These reports were fueled by allegations of stolen livestock and the discovery of animal remains at the site, supposedly including chickens, dogs, raccoons, and squirrels. Other legends involving Kay's Cross and Kay's Hollow include supposed sightings of werewolves, unexplained glowing lights, and voices in the area. Visitors have also reported feeling uneasy or unwell near the cross.

== Popular culture ==
In 2013, the site was opened to the public by the reported owners of the land, members of the Kingston family, as a business venture advertised as "Haunted Kay's Cross." Visitors are guided to the remains of the cross while hearing stories about its history and surrounding legends.

In 2018, Kay's Cross was featured on an episode of the paranormal reality series Ghost Adventures titled "Kay's Hollow." The episode, which aired on July 14, explored the hollow surrounding the cross and its alleged paranormal activity.

== See also ==
- Krishna Venta
- Satanic panic (Utah)
