= Paul Elden Kingston =

American Mormon fundamentalist (born 1959)

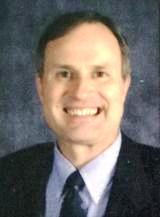

Trustee-in-Trust of the Davis County Cooperative Society
- Incumbent
- Assumed office August 25, 1987
- Preceded by: John Ortell Kingston

Personal details
- Born: 17 December 1959 (age 66) Utah, United States
- Spouse: At least 27
- Children: 300+
- Parent: John Ortell Kingston

Paul Elden Kingston (born 17 December 1959) is an accountant and attorney. Since 1987 he has served as the Trustee-in-Trust (Leader) of the Latter Day Church of Christ (LDCC), also known as Davis County Cooperative Society (DCCS) or the Kingston Group, a Mormon fundamentalist denomination. The DCCS is a financial cooperative established by his uncle Elden Kingston in 1935.

== Life ==
Paul Elden Kingston was born in 1959 as a son of John Ortell Kingston and LaDonna Peterson.

Kingston studied at the University of Utah Law School and was admitted to the Utah State Bar in 1990.

He succeeded his father John Ortell Kingston as the Trustee-in-Trust (Leader) of the DCCS upon his father's death in 1987. During his tenure, members have continued the practice of plural, and intra-family marriage.

== Wives and children ==
Kingston practices polygamy, accruing at least 27 wives and fathering more than 300 children. Three of his wives are his half-sisters and two are his nieces.

Latter Day Church of Christ
| Preceded by John Ortell Kingston | Trustee in Trust; August 25, 1987 - | Incumbent |
