= Krishna Venta =

American cult leader (1911–1958)

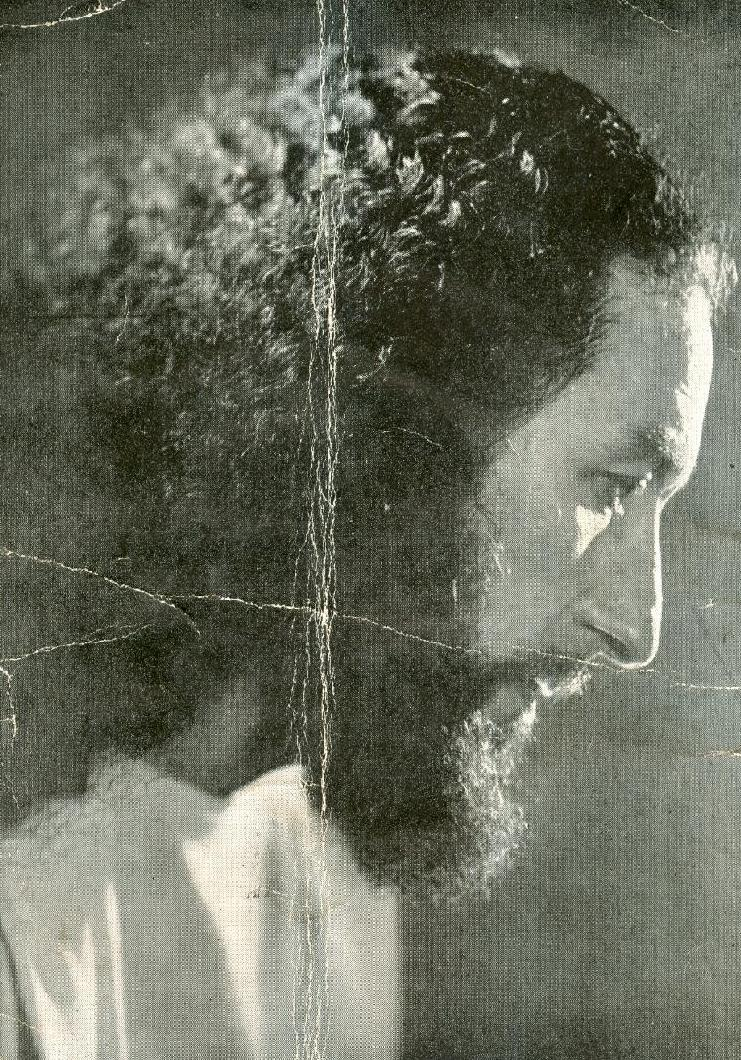
- Venta in the 1950s
- Born: Francis Herman Pencovic; March 29, 1911; San Francisco, California, U.S.
- Died: December 10, 1958 (aged 47); Chatsworth, California, U.S.
- Cause of death: Assassination
- Occupation: Occult leader

Krishna Venta (born Francis Herman Pencovic; March 29, 1911 – December 10, 1958) was an American occult leader. He was the leader of a Californian religious group in the 1940s and 1950s. Venta founded his WKFL (Wisdom, Knowledge, Faith, and Love) – Fountain of the World cult in Simi Valley, California.

== Early life ==
Francis Herman Pencovic was born in San Francisco in 1911 to Albert Pencovic, a Jewish immigrant from Romania, and his wife Maude Busenbach, born in Utah. Pencovic graduated from high school in Elko, Nevada. He married twice and served in the United States Army during World War II.

After World War II, Pencovic started his religion. In April 1948, he stated: "I may as well say it, I am Christ." Krishna claimed to have been born on another planet, Neophrates, 240,000 years ago. This planet purportedly occupied the same orbit as Earth does currently. Pencovic also alleged it was humanity’s first home. As Pencovic's canon goes, Neophrates moved inexorably closer to the sun and became uninhabitable. According to him, a fleet of great rocket ships, each more than a mile long and capable of carrying 35,000 people, then set off to colonize the dark planet that would become Earth. Naturally, their leader was the soul that would one day manifest as Krishna Venta. Along the way, Venta would bestow revelations upon such notables as Melchizedek of Salem, Kukulcan, Quelzalcoatl, Masaw, Abraham, Moses, Mohammed, the Buddha, the angels Moroni and Gabriel, and Jesus Christ. All of this was detailed in Krishna Venta’s history of humanity which detailed a series of periodic near-extinction-level events with distinctly theosophical and Mormon overtones. In 1951, he legally changed his name to "Krishna Venta" in California.

== Fountain of the World ==
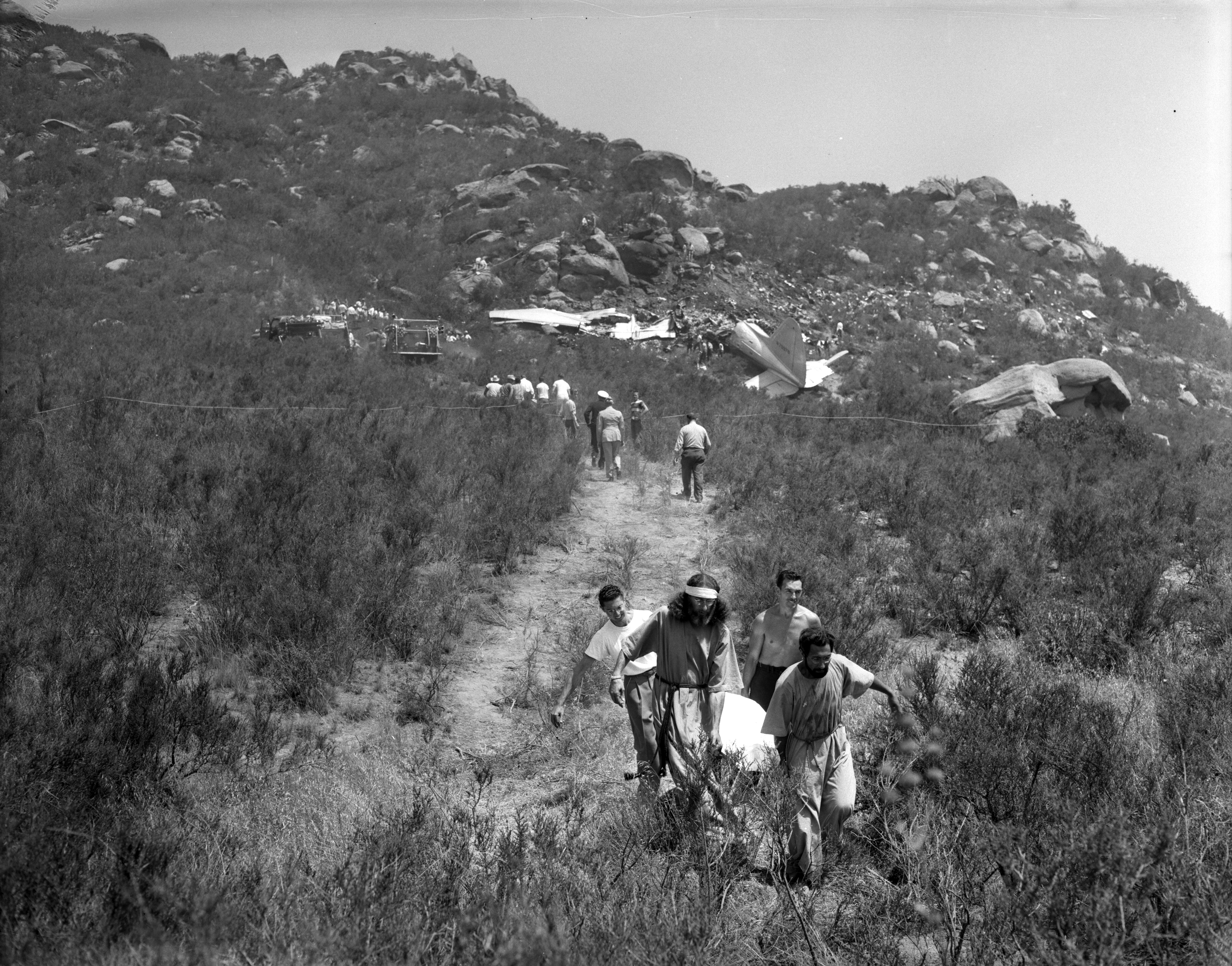
Venta (foreground, wearing headband) and other WKFL members carrying a plane crash victim to an ambulance

The Fountain of the World first gained national exposure in 1949 when the news reported that Fountain members were among the first to offer aid to the victims of Standard Air Lines Flight 897R, which crashed into the Simi Hills, killing 35 of the 48 people on board. They volunteered for other humanitarian efforts including fighting wildfires, offering shelter to those in need and feeding the homeless. They also drew attention in the press for uniformly dressing in robes, going barefoot, and requiring its male members to grow beards and wear their hair long. In 1956, a second branch of the WKFL Fountain of the World cult was established in Homer, Alaska. The Fountain was marginally controversial because one of the requirements for membership was that one donate all worldly assets to the group before joining. For most who joined the Fountain, this was irrelevant since most had few possessions anyway.

Venta foretold an imminent cataclysm, with the Master’s projected flock of 144,000 guaranteed to be saved and to build a new world once the dust and blood had settled, a version well adapted to the Cold-War climate of the times. The coming cataclysm would be a motivated civil war in the West, particularly in America, where the blacks would rise up and vanquish the whites (with aid from Russia). Then the Russians would turn around and conquer the blacks and try to take over the world. However, Krishna’s followers after spending the war tucked away in a safe place would re-emerge from a secret valley, conquer the Russians and build a new world of equality, justice, and peace, with Krishna Venta in his place as world messiah.

== Assassination ==
Venta was killed in Chatsworth, California, along with seven bystanders, on December 10, 1958 in a suicide bombing instigated by Peter Duma Kamenoff and Ralph Muller. The two disgruntled former followers had accused Venta of being a fraud who mishandled cult funds and had been intimate with their wives. The two ex-cultists were linked to the blast by bizarre tape recordings in which they vowed: "to bring Krishna to justice". The explosion blew off the roof of an adjoining dormitory for children and touched off a brush fire that swept over 150 acres. Two girls, ages 8 and 9, and a 59-year-old woman were seriously burned.

After his death two of his followers, Sister Thedra (Dorothy Leon) and Sister Wali, moved to Mount Shasta, California, where they channeled messages supposedly from him. Fountain membership at both sites declined rapidly following his death, and the cult had ceased to exist by the mid-1970s.

It is also purported that in 1968, ten years after Krishna Venta's assassination, another Jesus-claimant by the name of Charles Manson and his coterie (including Susan Atkins) resided for several months at the Fountain of the World. Manson had even made an unsuccessful bid to become their new Jesus-figure and leader. After being rejected from the commune, Manson moved his group to the nearby Spahn Movie Ranch.

Sun Myung Moon and his followers also took up residence with the Fountain of the World community for several months in 1968.

== Images ==
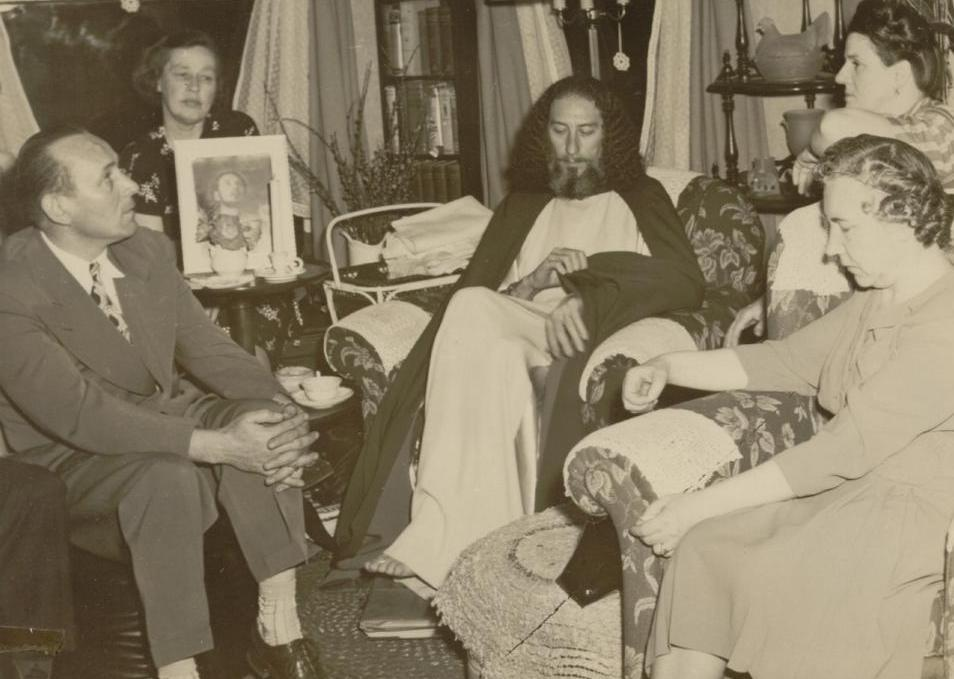
1949 Worcester Meeting, Rudi Balzer, Elsa Lackstrom, MKV, unknown, Signe Holme

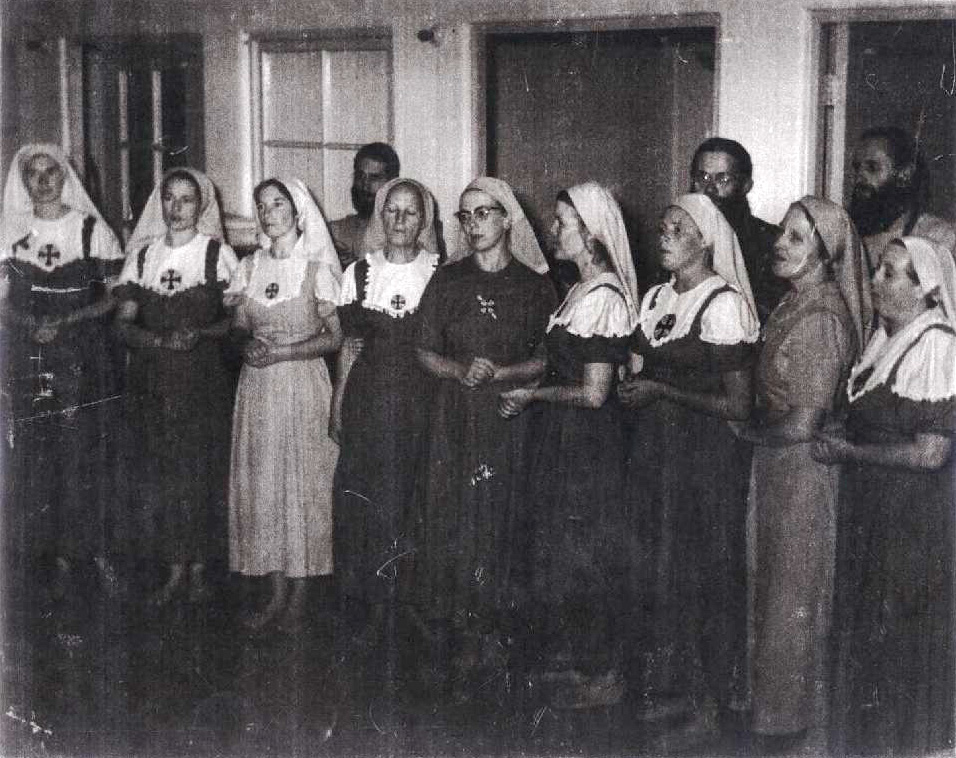
WKFL Choir at Olive View Sanatorium, Olive View, California. Front L–R, Audrey, Babs, Patrice, Ruth, Jane, Elesha, Bitzi, Lila, Leta, Rear L-R Gene, Earl, Asaiah

== See also ==
- List of people who have claimed to be Jesus
- Messiah complex
- Kay's Cross

== Bibliography ==
- Catton, Jr.; William R. (1957). What Kind of People Does a Religious Cult Attract? American Sociological Review 22 (5), 561–566 JSTOR 20899481 (subscription required)
