= John Ortell Kingston =

American Mormon fundamentalist leader (1919–1987)

J. Ortell Kingston
- Kingston in the Military

Trustee in Trust
- July 8, 1948 – August 25, 1987
- Predecessor: Elden Kingston
- Successor: Paul Elden Kingston

Personal details
- Born: John Ortell Kingston; May 19, 1919; Idaho, United States
- Died: August 25, 1987 (aged 68); Salt Lake City, Utah, United States
- Resting place: Bountiful Memorial Park; 40.8672°N 111.8874°W
- Spouse(s): At least thirteen, including: LaDonna Peterson Marion H. Tucker Isabell Johnson
- Children: 65+ (including Paul Elden Kingston)
- Parents: Charles W. Kingston

John Ortell Kingston (May 19, 1919 – August 25, 1987) was the Trustee of the Davis County Cooperative Society in Davis County, Utah, from 1948 until his death in 1987.

== Davis County Cooperative membership ==
John Ortell Kingston, colloquially known as "Brother Ortell" was the son of Charles W. Kingston, a member of the Church of Jesus Christ of Latter-day Saints (LDS Church) who had been excommunicated from the LDS Church on March 4, 1929. Kingston joined his brother Elden Kingston's cooperative shortly after its establishment. When Elden Kingston died from cancer in 1948, leadership of the Davis County Cooperative Society passed from Elden to Ortell.

During Ortell's tenure as Trustee of the Cooperative, some members formally organized the Latter Day Church of Christ in 1977. Most members of the Cooperative became members of the church and retain dual-membership in both organizations to this day.

== Finances ==
The Cooperative had its birth during the Great Depression when many families were finding it hard to provide for their families. For many years, members of the Co-operative lived in poor conditions with those in need having no legal way to apply for assistance. Plural families at times resorted to gathering expired groceries that had been thrown out from local stores. Long-time leader John Ortell Kingston himself lived in a small dilapidated one-story clapboard house in Salt Lake City up until the time of his death in 1987.

As Trustee, Kingston aggressively pursued a financially expansive agenda for the Cooperative in the hopes of improving the financial condition of his followers.

In 1983, after destitute members of the Cooperative had applied for assistance Utah sued Kingston to recoup the subsidies they had received, alleging they were ineligible to receive them due the cooperative's combined assets purporting to total $70 million. While admitting no wrongdoing, Kingston paid the state $250,000 to settle the case and it was dropped.

Over the past 25 years, many members have become college educated and live in middle, to upper-middle-class homes in their respective communities. Currently the group claims that although different skillsets bring different financial outcomes, there is no homelessness within the DCCS and internal programs exist for those experiencing financial poverty.

== Controversial practices ==
Kingston was living plural marriage until his death; he had married at least 13 wives and had dozens of children. Believing in the superiority of his bloodline he had also married 2 half-sisters and 2 nieces. According to one of his children he had experimented incest with his cattle before turning to his children. Some of his sons continued to marry half-sisters and nieces.

Throughout the 1940s and 50s, the state carried out an extensive campaign of legislation, raids and arrests in an attempt to break up plural families. For the Davis County Cooperative, this culminated in a Davis County Grand Jury investigation in 1959, 1960 described by the Ogden Standard-Examiner as "The polygamist hunting Davis County Grand Jury". This likely contributed to the Cooperative associating mostly within themselves, marrying within the group, including some consanguineous marriages. In the late 1990s, some non-members and ex-members began claiming the practice stemmed from theories of genetic purification. However, active members and recent independent research has more plausibly attributed the practice to "endogamous preference and the small size of the group’s population". Some of these marriages could be considered incestuous under Utah consanguinity laws.

Kingston taught his followers to "seek their own direction" when choosing who to marry, and to marry within the legal age of consent. For many members, this meant choosing to marry just after reaching legal age, which at times has been somewhat controversial. The legal age of consent in Utah has historically increased from 14, to 15, now to 16 with court approval in 2019. In a recent lawsuit, defendants allege abuses occurred in some marriages in the group. Some defendants were as young as 16 when married, which is within the legal age of marriage in Utah.

== Death ==
Kingston died in 1987 and was living plural marriage until his death. Ortell had at least thirteen wives and dozens of children. Kingston's sons comprise many of the members of the highest echelon of leadership within the cooperative as well as many of the plural families within the group.

== See also ==
- Latter Day Church of Christ

== Notes ==
Latter Day Church of Christ
Preceded by Elden Kingston	Trustee In Trust; July 8, 1948 - August 25, 1987	Succeeded by Paul Elden Kingston
