= Charles Kingston (cricketer) =

English cricketer

Personal information
- Full name: Charles Arthur Kingston
- Born: 5 December 1865; Northampton, Northamptonshire, England
- Died: 7 October 1917 (aged 51)
- Batting: Right-handed
- Relatives: Fred Kingston (brother); Hubert Kingston (brother); James Kingston (brother); William Kingston (brother)

Domestic team information
- Years: Team
- 1895–1896: Northamptonshire
- 1891/92: Demerara

Career statistics
Competition	First-class
Matches	3
Runs scored	34
Batting average	6.80
100s/50s	–/–
Top score	21
Balls bowled	–
Wickets	–
Bowling average	–
5 wickets in innings	–
10 wickets in match	–
Best bowling	–
Catches/stumpings	4/–
- Source: Cricinfo, 12 October 2013

Charles Arthur Kingston (5 December 1865 – 14 October 1917) was an English cricketer. Kingston was a right-handed batsman.

Born at Northampton, Northamptonshire, Kingston made his debut in first-class cricket while in British Guiana for Demerara against Barbados in the 1891/92 Inter-Colonial Tournament. He made two further first-class appearances in that seasons tournament, against Trinidad and in the tournament final against Barbados. Kingston scored a total of 34 runs in his three matches, averaging 6.80, with a high score of 21. He later returned to England, where he played minor counties cricket for Northamptonshire, debuting against Staffordshire in 1895 in what was Northamptonshire's inaugural Minor Counties Championship match. He made two further appearances for the county in the 1896 Minor Counties Championship against Northumberland and Durham.

He died on 14 October 1917. His brothers Fred, Hubert, James, and William all played first-class cricket.
