= Phil Kingston =

British climate activist

Phil Kingston (born 1936) is a climate activist and protester with the climate groups Christian Climate Action and Extinction Rebellion.

== Biography ==
Prior to getting involved in activism, Kingston was a lecturer at Bristol University.

=== Activism ===
In November 2018, Kingston was arrested after he obstructed traffic by blocking the road outside the Houses of Parliament. It was reported that when police moved him out of the way of traffic, he repeatedly attempted to lie back in the road.

In April 2019, he was arrested again for his part in a protest that disrupted the Docklands Light Railway when he and other activists climbed on the roof of a train while another protester glued themselves to one of the doors. He was granted bail on the conditions that he would respect a curfew and not travel to London.

During Extinction Rebellion's October Rebellion in 2019, Kingston was arrested several times after he graffitied and sprayed fake blood on the Treasury building, blocked access to London City Airport, and glued his hand to a DLR train at Shadwell station. He later said he regretted gluing himself to the train because he became aware of the impact it was having on commuters and because he "want[s] to target the corporations and government departments".

In December 2021, Kingston was acquitted for gluing himself to the train in April 2019, alongside the five other protesters involved.

His trial for gluing himself to the train in October 2019, along with the two other protesters who climbed on top of one of the carriages, began at Inner London Crown Court in January 2022. All three denied one charge of obstructing an engine or carriage on the railway, and were subsequently unanimously acquitted.

== Personal life ==
Kingston has four grandchildren. He is a Christian.
