= Racecourse Ground Promenade =

Cricket ground in Northampton, England

Coordinates: 52.24945°N 0.89049°W

Ground information
- Location: Northampton, Northamptonshire
- Establishment: 1844 (first recorded match)

Team information
United North of England Eleven	(1872)
- As of 1 September 2010; Source: Ground profile

Racecourse Ground Promenade was a cricket ground in Northampton, Northamptonshire, situated within what was Northampton Racecourse. The first recorded match on the ground was in 1844, when the Gentlemen of the North played the Gentlemen of the South. The ground held its only first-class match in 1872 when a United North of England Eleven played a United South of England Eleven. The ground held its final recorded match in 1885 when Northamptonshire played Warwickshire.

With the demise of the racecourse in 1904, the ground is today the location of Racecourse Park, a large open public space in the centre of Northampton.
