= Senator Kingston =

Senator Kingston may refer to:

- John T. Kingston (1819–1899), Wisconsin State Senate
- John Kingston Jr. (1860–1898), Wisconsin State Senate
