= Charles W. Kingston =

LDS church fundamentalist (1884–1975)

Personal details
- Born: Charles William Kingston; June 26, 1884; Croydon, Utah Territory, U.S.
- Died: November 29, 1975 (aged 91); Salt Lake City, Utah, U.S.
- Resting place: Bountiful Memorial Park; 40.868°N 111.886°W
- Known For: Supporting the creation of the Latter Day Church of Christ and the Davis County Cooperative Society
- Notable works: Laman Manasseh Victorious,
- Title: "05"
- Spouse(s): Lavenda "05.2" Newman (1907–2000); Vesta M. "05.1" Stowell (1884–1963); Merlyn Jenkins
- Parents: Charles Kingston; Mary P. L. Tucker

Charles William Kingston (June 26, 1884 – November 29, 1975) was a member of the Latter Day Church of Christ and the Davis County Cooperative Society.

== Early life ==
Kingston was born in Croydon, Utah Territory, the eldest son of Mary Priscilla Lerwill Tucker and Charles Kingston (an emigrant from Northamptonshire, England). Kingston's parents were members of the Church of Jesus Christ of Latter-day Saints, and Kingston's father would become a prominent leader of the LDS Church in southwestern Wyoming. At the age of eight, Kingston was baptized into the LDS Church. In 1899, Kingston's father, in the vest of the registrar at Evanston, talked with George T. Beck, then politician in the U.S. state of Wyoming, as well as business entrepreneur, and with Buffalo Bill, and offered a settlement of Mormons in the areas irrigated by the Bighorn Basin, built in Big Horn County, Wyoming. There was no outcome from these talks, however they prompted, in 1900, talks between Fenimore Chatterton and the president of the LDS that later prompted further Mormon settlements in the area.

In 1906, Kingston married Vesta Minerva Stowell in the Logan Utah Temple. Shortly after being married, Kingston began a mission for the LDS Church in the Eastern States Mission of the church. In 1908, he finished his mission and moved to a farm near Idaho Falls, Idaho, where he was employed by the Oregon Short Line Railroad. As part of his employment, Kingston made frequent trips to Salt Lake City, Utah, where he would attend the Salt Lake Temple.

== Involvement in plural marriage and excommunication ==
On one of Kingston's trips to Salt Lake City, he met Charles Zitting, a Latter-day Saint who was married to three plural wives but had not been excommunicated by the LDS Church. Zitting introduced Kingston to John W. Woolley, who had performed Zitting's plural marriages.

In 1928, Kingston was barred from entering the Salt Lake Temple when temple president George F. Richards learned that Kingston did not agree with the LDS Church's 1890 and 1904 renunciations of plural marriage. Kingston was initially opposed in his beliefs by his wife, children, and parents, all of whom tried to convince him to abandon a belief in plural marriage in order to prevent his excommunication from the LDS Church. However, in time he gained the support of his wife and children.

Kingston was excommunicated from the LDS Church on March 3, 1929. The disciplinary council wanted to give him six months to reconsider his position before excommunicating him, but Kingston insisted that the council make an immediate decision. Kingston said that seven days later, on March 12, he had a vision of God the Father and Jesus Christ, which reassured him that he had made the right decision.

== Mormon fundamentalist ==
In 1931, Kingston and Jesse Burke Stone published Laman Manasseh Victorious, a book justifying the continued Mormon practice of plural marriage. Kingston supported the leadership of John W. Woolley, Lorin C. Woolley, and J. Leslie Broadbent. The Church had soon been individually established by Charles's son Elden before Broadbent died in 1935 and founded the Latter Day Church of Christ of polygamists in Davis County, Utah.

Charles joined the Church soon after its creation and supported his son Elden Kingston who actively led the Latter Day Church of Christ until his death in 1948. In 1935, Kingston, along with his family and 1,200 members formed the Davis County Coop in Davis County, Utah, which, over time, became a diverse business empire, and, later, received a great deal of scrutiny for child allegations and abuse, which ended up with convictions of high-ranked officials of the coop. Upon Elden's death, Charles Kingston designated his son John Ortell Kingston as the leader of the Kingston Clan. Charles W. Kingston died in Salt Lake City, Utah. Shortly after Charles's death, Ortell formally created the Latter Day Church of Christ.
