= Elden Kingston =

Founder of Davis County Cooperative Society

- Elden Kingston c. 1940

Trustee in Trust
- 1 January 1935 – 8 July 1948
- Successor: Ortell Kingston

Personal details
- Born: Charles Elden Kingston; 10 October 1909; Idaho Falls, Idaho, United States
- Died: 8 July 1948 (aged 38); Bountiful, Utah, United States
- Cause of death: Metastatic carcinoma
- Resting place: Bountiful Memorial Park; 40.8672°N 111.8874°W
- Spouse(s): Including: Ethel Gustafson
- Parents: Charles W. Kingston; Vesta Minerva

Charles Elden Kingston (October 10, 1909 – July 8, 1948 ) was the founder of the Davis County Cooperative Society in 1935.

Elden Kingston was supported by his father Charles W. Kingston, his mother Vesta Minerva Kingston, and his siblings as the leader of the Davis County Cooperative Society. In 1941 Elden Kingston legally organized his cooperative as the Davis County Cooperative Society.

== See also ==
- Kay's Cross

Latter Day Church of Christ titles
Preceded by J. Leslie Broadbent as Senior Member of the Priesthood Council	Trustee In Trust; January 1, 1935 - July 8, 1948	Succeeded by John Ortell Kingston
