= Fred Kingston =

English clergyman, schoolmaster, and cricketer

Frederick William Kingston (24 December 1855 – 30 January 1933) was an English clergyman, schoolmaster and cricketer who played a few first-class cricket matches for Cambridge University and amateur sides in 1878 and 1886. He was born in Oundle, Northamptonshire and died at Willington, Bedfordshire.

Fred Kingston was the eldest of seven brothers who played first-class cricket or other cricket just below first-class level – several of them, including Fred, played for Northamptonshire in years before and, in Hubert's case, just after the side's accession to first-class status in 1905. A right-handed batsman and wicket-keeper, Fred Kingston's first match while he was a student at Pembroke College, Cambridge, came for an England XI against the university side, and a few weeks later he played for a team calling itself "The Gentlemen of England" in a 12-a-side first-class match against Oxford University at Oxford in which he scored 61 in the middle order. He then appeared in three matches for the Cambridge University side, the final one of which was the 1878 University Match against Oxford, though he did not keep wicket in this game and batted low in the Cambridge line-up. That was the end of his first-class cricket apart from a single appearance for a "Cambridge Past and Present" side which played the Australians in 1886, when he batted at No 10 and kept wicket. He continued, however, to play lower grade cricket, mainly for Northamptonshire but also for Devon. In 1882, he captained the Northamptonshire side in their non-first-class match against the Australians.

== Career outside cricket ==
Kingston was ordained as a Church of England clergyman after he graduated from Cambridge University and served from 1883 to 1886 as curate in a parish at Callington in Cornwall. In 1886, he moved back to Northamptonshire to become headmaster of Guilsborough Grammar School where he remained until 1910, at times combining his scholastic duties with curacies in local parishes. After 1910, he returned full-time to church work, and was vicar of Willington in Bedfordshire from 1913 until his death.
