= Jeff Kingston =

American professor (born 1957)

- Born: June 26, 1957 (age 69)
- Education: Columbia University
- Occupations: Writer, professor
- Writing career
- Language: English
- Subjects: Japan, Asia

Jeffrey "Jeff" Kingston (born June 26, 1957) is an American professor at Temple University, Japan Campus in Tokyo and an author. He has written a number of books, wrote regularly for The Japan Times, and frequently comments on Asian affairs in mass media outlets.

== Early life and studies ==
He graduated with a BS in foreign service from Georgetown University in 1979. He then completed an MA in international affairs in 1981 and a PhD in history, both from Columbia University.

== Academic career ==
Kingston was the founding director of Asian Studies at Temple University, Japan Campus in Tokyo.

== Writing ==
Kingston has published a number of academic volumes about Japan, nationalism, religion, and civil society in Asia. He started writing for The Japan Times in 1988, and had a weekly column called "Counterpoint" from 2013 until 2017. He has contributed opinion pieces to Financial Times, The Guardian, The Atlantic, Nikkei Asian Review, Washington Post, and The Mekong Review. He also writes for The Asia-Pacific Journal: Japan Focus.

== Views ==
Kingston has been a consistent critic of Japanese Prime Minister Shinzō Abe and his moves to amend Article 9 of the Japanese Constitution, which restricts Japan's military and on Abe's historical revisionism about Japanese war crimes.

== Bibliography ==
=== Books written ===
- The Politics of Religion, Nationalism, and Identity in Asia (Rowman & Littlefield, 2019)
- Japan (Polity Press, 2019)
- Contemporary Japan: History, Politics and Social Change Since the 1980s (Wiley-Blackwell 2010, 2012)
- Japan in transformation 1945–2020 (Routledge,2021)
- Japan in transformation 1945–2010 (Pearson, 2010)
- Japan in transformation 1952–2000 (Longmans, 2001)
- Kokka Saisei (Hayakawa 2005)
- Japan's quiet transformation: Social change and civil society in the 21st century (2004)

=== Edited volumes ===
- The Routledge Handbook of Trauma in East Asia (Routledge 2023)
- Japan in the Heisei Era (1989–2019) (Routledge 2022)
- Press Freedom in Contemporary Asia (Routledge 2019)
- Japan's Foreign Relations in Asia (Routledge 2018)
- Press Freedom in Contemporary Japan (Routledge, 2017)
- Asian Nationalism since 1945 (Wiley-Blackwell, 2016)
- Contemporary Japanese Politics (4 volumes) (2013)
- Natural Disaster and Nuclear Crisis in Japan: Response and Recover After Japan's 3/11 (2012)
- Tsunami: Japan's Post-Fukushima Future (Foreign Policy, 2011)
