= William Kingston (cricketer) =

English cricketer (1874–1956)

William Harold Kingston (12 August 1874 – 17 February 1956) was an English cricketer active from 1895 to 1909 who played for Northamptonshire (Northants). He was born and died in Northampton. He appeared in 78 first-class matches as a righthanded batsman who scored 2,599 runs with a highest score of 83.
