= Denton (surname) =

- Language: English

Origin
- Language: English
- Derivation: Denton, North Yorkshire; Denton, Kent; Denton, Lancashire; Denton, Norfolk; Denton, Lincolnshire

Denton is an English surname. It refers to someone from the location Denton, of which there are several, including in Yorkshire, Kent, Lancashire, Norfolk, and Lincolnshire.

It may refer to:

== People ==
- Alec Denton (born 1994), English footballer
- Aleksandra Denton (born 1988), stage name Shura, English singer and musician
- Alexander Denton (Royalist) (died 1645), English politician
- Alexander Denton (judge) (1679–1740), English Member of Parliament and Justice of the Common Pleas
- Alexander Denton (1654–1698), Member of Parliament for Buckingham
- Andrew Denton (born 1960), Australian television producer, comedian, presenter and host
- Anouk Denton (born 2003), English cricketer
- Arthur Denton, English cricketer active from 1914 to 1920
- Betty Denton (born 1943), American politician
- Bill Denton (1911–1946), American artistic gymnast
- Bob Denton (1934–2014), American National Football League player
- Bobby E. Denton (born 1938), American politician
- Bradley Denton (born 1958), American author of science fiction and other genres
- Carl Denton (1874–1955), American orchestra conductor
- Charles Denton (television and film producer) (born 1937), English production executive
- Charles Ashpitel Denton (1852–1932), English amateur footballer
- Daniel Denton (c. 1626–1703), early American colonist and writer
- David Denton (born 1990), retired Zimbabwean-born Scottish rugby union player
- David Denton (cricketer) (1874–1950), English cricketer
- Delroy Denton (born c. 1971), Jamaican gangster, convicted murderer, rapist and suspected serial killer
- Denice Denton (1959–2006), American academician
- Derek Denton (1924–2022), Australian scientist
- Edmund Denton, 1st Baronet (1676–1714), English Member of Parliament
- Elizabeth Denton (died 1519), English noblewoman and courtier, governess of English royal children
- Eric James Denton (1923–2007), British marine biologist
- Eric Denton (musician), founding member of the early-80s new wave band The Monroes
- Eric Denton (soccer) (born 1978), American soccer player
- Fatima Denton (born August 1966), British-Gambian climatologist
- Federico Hernández Denton (born 1944), 15th chief justice of the Supreme Court of Puerto Rico
- Geoffrey R. Denton (born 1931), British economist
- George Denton (disambiguation)
- Gerard Denton (born 1975), Australian former first-class cricketer
- Harold Denton (1936–2017), American nuclear engineer and Director of the Office of Nuclear Reactor Regulation
- Jack Denton (1872–1949), British actor and film director of the silent era
- James Denton (disambiguation)
- Jane Denton (born 1953), United Kingdom nurse and midwife
- Jean Denton, Baroness Denton of Wakefield (1935–2001), British businesswoman, racing driver and politician
- Jeremiah Denton (1924–2014), American politician and admiral, former U.S. senator
- Jim Denton (1900–1979), English rugby league footballer
- Joe Denton (1865–1946), English first-class cricketer
- John Denton (disambiguation)
- Julie Denton (born 1960), American politician
- Kelly Denton (born 1973), American former NASCAR stock car racing driver
- Kit Denton (1928–1997), Australian author, father of Andrew Denton
- Lane Denton (fl. 1971–1977), American politician
- Len Denton (born 1958), American professional wrestler
- Mary Florence Denton (1857–1947), American educator in Japan
- Merv Denton (1920–1980), Australian rugby league footballer
- Michael Denton (born 1943), British-Australian biochemist
- Minna C. Denton (1873–1958), American home economist and food scientist
- Nancy Denton, American sociologist
- Neville Denton (1934–2015), New Zealand rugby league footballer
- Nick Denton (born 1966), founder of Gawker Media
- Oli Denton (born 1990), English rugby union player
- Oscar Denton (born 1953), American politician
- Peter Denton (footballer) (1946–2016), British footballer
- Peter Denton (musician), former member of the English indie rock band The Kooks
- Peter Denton (pole vaulter) (1926–2000), Australian pole vaulter
- Randy Denton (born 1949), American basketball player
- Richard Denton (born 1941), British biochemist
- Richard Denton (producer), British television producer
- Richard Denton (1586–1662), founder of one of the first Presbyterian churches in America
- Rob Denton (1907–1997), American soccer goalkeeper
- Roger Denton (born 1953), English former footballer
- Samuel Denton (1803–1860), American medical doctor, professor of medicine and politician
- Sandra Denton (born 1964), American/Jamaican hip hop artist and part of Salt n Pepa
- Shannon Denton, American artist, writer, editor, producer and storyteller
- Sherman Foote Denton (1854–1937), American naturalist and illustrator
- Solomon Wilbur Denton (1816–1864), an early member of the Latter Day Saint movement
- Steve Denton (born 1956), American former tennis player, college head men's tennis coach
- Sylvia Denton (1941–2020), one of the first breast care nurses in the United Kingdom
- Terry Denton (1950–2026), Australian author and illustrator
- Thomas Denton (disambiguation), also Tom
- Tim Denton (born 1973), American former football player
- Tyler Denton (born 1995), English footballer
- Will Denton (born 1990), American actor
- William Denton (disambiguation)
- Winfield K. Denton (1896–1971), American politician, lawyer and US Army lieutenant colonel

== Fictional characters ==
- Eric Denton (Under the Dome), in the television series Under the Dome
- JC Denton, the main/playing character in the video game Deus Ex
- Thomas Denton (Shortland Street), on the New Zealand soap opera Shortland Street

== See also ==
- Denton (disambiguation)
- Denton (given name)
- Baron Denton, subsidiary title of Earl Kitchener of Khartoum in the Peerage of the United Kingdom
- Danton (name)
