= Denton =

Denton may refer to:

== Places ==
=== England ===
- Denton, Cambridgeshire, a hamlet and former civil parish, part of Denton and Caldecote
- Denton, County Durham, a village
- Denton, East Sussex, a village
- Denton, Gravesham, part of the town of Gravesend, Kent
- Denton, Greater Manchester, a town
  - Denton railway station
- Denton, Kent, a village and former civil parish near Canterbury
- Denton, Lincolnshire, a village and civil parish
- Denton, Newcastle upon Tyne, an electoral ward
- Denton, Norfolk, a village and civil parish
- Denton, Northamptonshire, South Northamptonshire, a village and civil parish
- Denton, North Yorkshire, a hamlet and civil parish
- Denton, Oxfordshire, a hamlet
- Denton Holme, an inner city district in Carlisle, Cumbria
- Denton Urban District, a local government district in England from 1894 to 1974

=== United States ===
- Denton, Arkansas, a village
- Denton, Georgia, a city
- Denton, Kansas, a city
- Denton, Kentucky, an unincorporated community
- Denton, Maryland, a town
- Denton Township, Michigan
- Denton, Mississippi, an unincorporated community
- Denton, Johnson County, Missouri, an unincorporated community
- Denton, Pemiscot County, Missouri, an unincorporated community and census-designated place
- Denton, Montana, a town
- Denton, Nebraska, a village
- Denton, North Carolina, a town
- Denton County, Texas
  - Denton, Texas, a city and the county seat
- Lake Denton, Florida
- Denton Creek, Texas

=== Antarctica ===
- Denton Hills, Victoria Land

== Fictional places ==
- Denton, setting for the English TV series A Touch of Frost and the Frost novels of R. D. Wingfield
- A fictional town, setting for the film The Rocky Horror Picture Show (1975) and its standalone sequel Shock Treatment (1981)
- Denton, a town in the 2016 film In a Valley of Violence

== People and fictional characters ==
- Denton (surname), including a list of people and fictional characters
- Denton (given name), a list of people

== Schools ==
- Denton Community College, Denton, Greater Manchester
- Denton High School, Denton, Texas

== Sports ==
- Denton F.C., a former English association football club from Denton, Manchester
- Denton Diablos FC, an American semi-professional soccer club based in Denton, Texas
- Denton Outlaws, a collegiate summer baseball team based in Denton, Texas, from 2005 to 2007

== Other uses ==
- Baron Denton, subsidiary title of Earl Kitchener of Khartoum in the Peerage of the United Kingdom
- SNR Denton, a former multinational law firm co-headquartered in London and Washington, D.C., merged to form Dentons in 2013
- Denton Designs, a former British video game developer
- Denton (talk show), Australian late night talk show (1994-1995), hosted by Andrew Denton
- USS Jeremiah Denton, a guided missile destroyer
- SS Dessoug, a ship built in 1864 originally named Denton
- Denton Airport (disambiguation)

== See also ==
- Denton Amendment, also known as the Denton Cargo Program, a United States government humanitarian program launched in 1987
- Denton Castle, Denton, Norfolk
- Denton Hall, Wharfedale, Yorkshire
- Denton House (disambiguation), the name of two historic houses
- Denton Manor, Denton, Lincolnshire
- Upper Denton, Carlisle, Cumbria
- Denton Homestead, East Rockaway, New York, on the National Register of Historic Places
- Denton Wilde Sapte, informally Dentons, an international law firm headquartered in London which merged to form SNR Denton
- Dentons, a law firm based in the United States, created by a merger involving SNR Denton
- Dr. Denton, an American brand of blanket sleepers
- Danton (name)
