= Kenneth R. Timmerman =

American journalist

Kenneth R. Timmerman (born November 4, 1953) is a political writer and conservative activist.

Timmerman is executive director of the Foundation for Democracy in Iran, an organization that works to support democratic movements in Iran. He authored Shakedown: Exposing the Real Jesse Jackson, a bestseller about the activist. Timmerman has also written on the spread of weapons of mass destruction in the Middle East. He is currently employed as an expert at Wikistrat.

Timmerman ran for public office in Maryland as a Republican in 2000 (U.S. senator), 2012 (U.S. representative), and 2014 (lieutenant governor).

== Early life and career ==
Born in New York in 1953, Timmerman obtained a BA from Goddard College in 1973 and an M.A. from Brown University in 1976. He moved to France, where he pursued a career as a novelist, publishing a novel called Wren Hunt in 1976 and a novella called The Iskra Scrolls in 1980.

== Middle East and defense correspondent ==
In the early 1980s, Timmerman became a Middle East correspondent for The Atlanta Journal-Constitution and developed an expertise in arms trade. In 1982, he was taken prisoner for 24 days by Fatah guerrillas in Lebanon. He was the first U.S. journalist on the scene when Islamic militants bombed the U.S. Embassy in 1983.

From 1985 to 1987, Timmerman was a correspondent for Defense and Armament Newsweek and Military Technology, covering the Iran–Iraq War and the arms industry in the Middle East. He won the Joe Petrosino Prize for Investigative Reporting in 1987 for an investigation of an Iranian arms procurement group.

From 1987 to 1993, Timmerman published the Middle East Defense News and was international correspondent for Defense Electronics. He also wrote monographs for the Simon Wiesenthal Center on efforts by Iraq, Syria and Libya to acquire weapons of mass destruction.

== Author and activist ==
In 1991, Timmerman published The Death Lobby: How the West Armed Iraq after the Gulf War. Timmerman advised the United Nations Special Commission for the Disarmament of Iraq on the location of weapons plants.

In 1993, Timmerman returned to the US where he worked as a member of the staff of the U.S. House Committee on International Relations. In 1995, he founded the Foundation for Democracy in Iran with Peter Rodman, Joshua Muravchik and Iranian opposition expatriates to attempt to topple the Iranian government. He founded the Middle East Data Project to advise governments and private companies. In 1998, he made suggestions to the Rumsfeld Commission supporting the deployment of a national missile defence system.

In 1998, he wrote a piece on Osama bin Laden and his training camps in Afghanistan just before Al-Qaeda attacked two US embassies in Africa. He also wrote features for the American Spectator criticizing the export of high-technology equipment to China, which was published as a book in 2000.

In 2002, Timmerman wrote Shakedown: Exposing the Real Jesse Jackson as a change of pace from his focus on international issues. It claimed that Jackson had alleged connections with criminals and that he practiced extortion of businesses. The book proved to be highly successful. making the top ten bestseller list with 200,000 copies printed. It also reached the top of the Amazon bestseller list.

On February 7, 2006, Sweden's former deputy prime minister and Liberal party leader Per Ahlmark said that he had nominated Timmerman for a Nobel Peace Prize along with UN Ambassador John Bolton for "their repeated warnings and documentation of Iran's secret nuclear buildup and revealing Iran's repeated lying and false reports to the International Atomic Energy Agency." The Nobel Foundation will not confirm nominations, however, until 50 years have passed.

== Elections in Maryland ==
Timmerman was the 2012 Republican nominee for U.S. Representative for the newly redrawn Maryland's 8th congressional district, facing the incumbent Chris Van Hollen, a Democrat. Timmerman lost to Van Hollen, 33% to 63%. In 2000, Timmerman was a candidate for the Republican nomination for U.S. Senator from Maryland. Timmerman won less than ten percent in the party primary; Paul Rappaport won the Republican nomination but lost to incumbent Paul Sarbanes, who won with 63% of the vote.

Timmerman ran for Lieutenant Governor of Maryland on a ticket with businessman Charles Lollar in the 2014 Maryland gubernatorial election. The Lollar/Timmerman ticket finished third in the Republican primary.

== Bibliography ==
- The Wren Hunt Bran's Head Books 1976, 1982 ISBN 0-905220-32-3
- The Iskra Scrolls novella Handshake Press Paris 1980
- Fanning the Flames: Guns, Greed, and Geopolitics in the Gulf War syndicated by New York Times Syndication Sales, 1987, published in book form as "Öl ins Feuer Internationale Waffengeschäfte im Golfkrieg" Orell Füssli Verlag Zürich and Wiesbaden 1988 ISBN 3-280-01840-4
- La Grande Fauche: Le vol de la haute technologie (Gorbachev's Technology Wars: How the U.S.S.R Arms Itself in the West) Editions Plon Paris 1989
- The Poison Gas Connection: The Chemical Weapons Programs of Iraq and Libya Simon Wiesenthal Center Los Angeles 1990
- The Death Lobby: How the West Armed Iraq Houghton Mifflin Boston 1991 ISBN 0-395-59305-0
- The BNL Blunder: How the U.S. Policy Allowed a Bank in Atlanta to Finance Saddam Hussein's War Machine Simon Wiesenthal Center Los Angeles 1991
- Weapons of Mass Destruction: the Cases of Iran, Syria and Libya Simon Wiesenthal Center Los Angeles 1992
- Shakedown: Exposing the Real Jesse Jackson Regenery Washington DC 2002 ISBN 0-89526-165-0
- Preachers of Hate: Islam and the War on America Crown Forum 2003 ISBN 1-4000-4901-6
- The French Betrayal of America Crown Forum 2004 ISBN 1-4000-5366-8
- Countdown to Crisis: The Coming Nuclear Showdown with Iran Crown Forum 2005 ISBN 1-4000-5368-4
- Timmerman, Kenneth R. Countdown to crisis: the coming nuclear showdown with Iran. Three Rivers Press (CA), 2006.
- Shadow Warriors: The Untold Story of Traitors, Saboteurs, and the Party of Surrender Crown Forum 2007
- Honor Killing Cassiopeia Press, 2007
- Dark Forces: The Truth About What Happened in Benghazi Broadside Books, 2014
- Deception: The Making of the YouTube Video Hillary and Obama Blamed for Benghazi PostHill Press, 2016
- ISIS Begins, a Novel of the War in Iraq PostHill Press, 2019
- The Election Heist, PostHill Press, 2020
