= Charles Denton =

Charles Denton may refer to:

- Charles Denton (television and film producer) (born 1937), English production executive
- Charles Ashpitel Denton (1852–1932), English amateur footballer who appeared in the 1877 and 1878 FA Cup Finals

== See also ==
- Denton (disambiguation)
