= John Denton =

John Denton may refer to:

- John Denton (fl. 1413–1416), MP for Huntingdon (UK Parliament constituency)
- John Denton (died 1576), MP for Banbury (UK Parliament constituency)
- John B. Denton (1806–1841), American Methodist Episcopal Church minister and soldier
- John Bailey Denton (1814–1893), British surveyor and civil engineer
- John Denton (cricketer) (1890–1971), English cricketer
- John Denton (architect) (fl. 1970s–2000s), Australian architect
- Jon Denton (born c. 1978), American football quarterback
