= Listed buildings in Denton, Norfolk =

Non-Civil Parish in Norfolk, England

Denton is a village and civil parish in the South Norfolk district of Norfolk, England. It contains 38 listed buildings that are recorded in the National Heritage List for England. Of these two are grade I, one is grade II* and 84 are grade II.

This list is based on the information retrieved online from Historic England.

== Key ==
Grade	Criteria
I	Buildings that are of exceptional interest
II*	Particularly important buildings of more than special interest
II	Buildings that are of special interest

== Listing ==
Name	Grade	Location	Type	Completed (Note: The date given is the date used by Historic England as significant for the initial building or that of an important part in the structure's description.)	Date designated	Grid ref. (Note: The grid reference is based on the British national grid reference system, sometimes known as OSGB36, used by the Ordnance Survey.) Geo-coordinates	Notes	Entry number (Note: The "List Entry Number" is a unique number assigned to each listed building and scheduled monument by Historic England.)	Image	Wikidata
Chapel Cottage	II	Chapel Corner			26 June 1981	TM2797688408; 52°26′46″N 1°21′12″E		1305023	Upload Photo	Q26591934
Street Farmhouse	II	Chapel Corner			26 June 1981	TM2802388470; 52°26′48″N 1°21′14″E		1373624	Upload Photo	Q26654588
United Reformed Church	II	Chapel Corner			11 September 1951	TM2796088468; 52°26′48″N 1°21′11″E		1172628	Upload Photo	Q26467396
Watch House	II	Chapel Corner			26 June 1981	TM2798088286; 52°26′42″N 1°21′12″E		1049565	Upload Photo	Q26301591
Chapel Hill Farmhouse	II	Chapel Hill			26 June 1981	TM2746688701; 52°26′56″N 1°20′45″E		1049566	Upload Photo	Q26301592
Darrow Green Farmhouse	II	Darrow Green			26 June 1981	TM2610889427; 52°27′21″N 1°19′35″E		1049567	Upload Photo	Q26301593
Ivy Farmhouse	II	Darrow Green Road			26 June 1981	TM2696489907; 52°27′36″N 1°20′22″E		1373625	Upload Photo	Q26654589
Pear Tree Farmhouse	II	Darrow Green Road			26 June 1981	TM2688989808; 52°27′33″N 1°20′18″E		1172642	Upload Photo	Q26467417
Grotto in Garden of and to West of Denton House	II	Denton Hill			7 December 1959	TM2840486968; 52°25′59″N 1°21′31″E		1049568	Upload Photo	Q26301594
Home Farmhouse	II	Denton Hill			26 June 1981	TM2828486941; 52°25′58″N 1°21′24″E		1172651	Upload Photo	Q26467428
Sham Ruin in Garden to West of Denton House	II	Denton Hill			26 June 1981	TM2842486965; 52°25′58″N 1°21′32″E		1172666	Upload Photo	Q26467443
Whitehouse Farmhouse	II	Denton Road			26 June 1981	TM2883090193; 52°27′42″N 1°22′01″E		1373229	Upload Photo	Q26654227
Church of St Mary	I	Earsham Road	church building		7 December 1959	TM2862587345; 52°26′10″N 1°21′43″E		1373626	Church of St Mary More images	Q17524686
Denton Lodge	II	Earsham Road			11 September 1951	TM2951987438; 52°26′12″N 1°22′31″E		1049569	Upload Photo	Q26301595
Stables Immediately North-west of Denton Lodge	II	Earsham Road			11 September 1951	TM2949687474; 52°26′13″N 1°22′30″E		1151935	Upload Photo	Q26444905
The Rectory	II	Earsham Road			26 June 1981	TM2858787414; 52°26′13″N 1°21′41″E		1305013	Upload Photo	Q26591925
Glebe Farmhouse	II	Great Green			26 June 1981	TM2815089442; 52°27′19″N 1°21′23″E		1373627	Upload Photo	Q26654590
King's Head Inn	II	Great Green	inn		26 June 1981	TM2802689807; 52°27′31″N 1°21′18″E		1049570	King's Head Inn More images	Q26301596
Mutts Farmhouse	II	Great Green			26 June 1981	TM2740889842; 52°27′33″N 1°20′45″E		1304984	Upload Photo	Q26591900
Manor Farm Cottage	II	Manor Farm Road			26 June 1981	TM2692089437; 52°27′21″N 1°20′18″E		1373628	Upload Photo	Q26654591
Manor Farmhouse	II	Manor Farm Road			26 June 1981	TM2699888747; 52°26′58″N 1°20′21″E		1049571	Upload Photo	Q26301597
Walnut Tree Farmhouse	II	Manor Farm Road			26 June 1981	TM2693989164; 52°27′12″N 1°20′19″E		1151957	Upload Photo	Q26444926
Grove Cottages	II	Middle Road			26 June 1981	TM2855888232; 52°26′39″N 1°21′42″E		1049572	Upload Photo	Q26301598
Hall Cottages	II	Middle Road			26 June 1981	TM2872088345; 52°26′43″N 1°21′51″E		1151970	Upload Photo	Q26444937
Kingsland Farm	II	Middle Road			11 September 1951	TM2855188108; 52°26′35″N 1°21′41″E		1304989	Upload Photo	Q26591905
Little Green Farmhouse	II	Middle Road			26 June 1981	TM2930689233; 52°27′10″N 1°22′24″E		1050400	Upload Photo	Q26302387
Lodge Farmhouse	II*	Middle Road			26 June 1981	TM2890988611; 52°26′51″N 1°22′01″E		1373629	Upload Photo	Q17533257
Barn Immediately North-west of Payneshill Farmhouse	II	Paynes Hill			26 June 1981	TM2696988599; 52°26′53″N 1°20′19″E		1151975	Upload Photo	Q26444940
Payneshill Farmhouse	II	Paynes Hill			26 June 1981	TM2695388584; 52°26′53″N 1°20′18″E		1049573	Upload Photo	Q26301599
Pockthorpe Cottages	II	Pockthorpe Lane			26 June 1981	TM2758488732; 52°26′57″N 1°20′52″E		1049574	Upload Photo	Q26301600
Globe House	II	The Street			26 June 1981	TM2805688672; 52°26′54″N 1°21′16″E		1304964	Upload Photo	Q26591882
Trunch House	II	Trunch Hill, IP20 0AE			26 June 1981	TM2822487610; 52°26′20″N 1°21′23″E		1049575	Upload Photo	Q26301601
Beck Cottage	II	Trunch Road			26 June 1981	TM2806187955; 52°26′31″N 1°21′15″E		1152000	Upload Photo	Q26444962
Hill View	II	Trunch Road			26 June 1981	TM2797288099; 52°26′36″N 1°21′11″E		1152008	Upload Photo	Q26444969
Vale Farmhouse	II	Trunch Road			26 June 1981	TM2784187959; 52°26′31″N 1°21′03″E		1049576	Upload Photo	Q26301602
Dentonwash Farmhouse	II	Wash Lane			26 June 1981	TM2964287214; 52°26′05″N 1°22′37″E		1050366	Upload Photo	Q26302353
Wash Cottage	II	Wash Lane			26 June 1981	TM2986187233; 52°26′05″N 1°22′48″E		1050365	Upload Photo	Q26302352
Low Farmhouse	II	Wortwell Road			26 June 1981	TM2919786856; 52°25′54″N 1°22′12″E		1049577	Upload Photo	Q26301603

== See also ==
- Grade I listed buildings in Norfolk
- Grade II* listed buildings in Norfolk

== Sources ==
- Wilson, Bill; Pevsner, Nikolaus (1999) [1962], Norfolk 2: North-West and South, The Buildings of England, New Haven and London: Yale University Press, ISBN 978-0-300-09657-6
