= Dinton =

Dinton may refer to:

- Dinton, Buckinghamshire
- Dinton, Wiltshire

== See also ==
- Danton (name)
