= Dainton =

Dainton may refer to:

- Dainton, Devon, a settlement in Teignbridge, Devon, England
  - Dainton Bank, a railway incline in Devon

== People with the surname ==
- Bethan Dainton (born 1989), Welsh international rugby union player
- Frederick Dainton, Baron Dainton (1914–1997), British academic chemist and university administrator
- Lee Dainton (born 1973), Welsh stunt performer, skateboarder, and filmmaker
- John Dainton, British physicist and professor, son of Frederick Dainton

== See also ==
- Danton (disambiguation)
