= When Hell Was in Session =

Memoir by Jeremiah Denton

- First edition cover
- Author: Jeremiah Denton
- Language: English
- Genre: Autobiography
- Publisher: Reader's Digest
- Publication date: 1975
- Publication place: United States
- ISBN: 9780883491126

When Hell Was in Session is a 1975 memoir by U.S. Navy Rear Admiral Jeremiah Denton, recounting his experiences as an American prisoner of war (POW) during the Vietnam War.

== Synopsis ==
A Navy pilot, Denton's jet was shot down over North Vietnam in July 1965. Denton and his navigator, Bill Tschudy, parachuted down and were soon taken prisoner. Both men spent seven years and seven months in North Vietnam as often-tortured POWs. In May 1966, the North Vietnamese allowed a Japanese TV reporter to interview him, where he blinked out the word "torture" in Morse code, confirming the United States suspicions that prisoners were being mistreated during the Vietnam War.

== Film adaption, documentary and updated version ==
In 1979, the book was made into a television movie starring Hal Holbrook. It was adapted by screenwriter Jake Justiz, also known as Lee Pogostin.

Denton, James Stockdale, Larry Guarino, and James Robinson Risner, distinguished themselves as members of the American POW resistance movement from 1965 to 1973, helping POWs accomplish their sworn goal to "return with honor". Return with Honor was later used as the title of a documentary film released in 2000 about American POWs during the Vietnam War, narrated and produced by actor Tom Hanks. In November 2009, an updated version of the book was released with the following epilogue from Denton:

There was the shock at the difference between 1965 and 1973 in terms of cultural standards, I saw the appearance of X-rated movies, adult magazines, massage parlors, the proliferation of drugs, promiscuity, premarital sex and unwed mothers.

— Jeremiah Denton

== Reception ==
The Library Journal said that "while the nature of the material is well calculated to hold the reader's interest, the narrative skips and jumps in a disruptive manner". They also noted that "the author at time becomes overbearingly righteous in his presentation, and the overall impression is one of haste".
