= James Denton (disambiguation) =

James Denton (born 1963) is an American actor.

James Denton may also refer to:

- James S. Denton (1951–2018), American publisher and editor
- James Samuel Denton (1875–1963), Australian army officer and politician
- James G. Denton (1917–1982), Justice of the Supreme Court of Texas
- James Denton (priest), English priest
