= Lawrence N. Guarino =

US Air Force officer (1922–2014)

Lawrence Nicholas Guarino
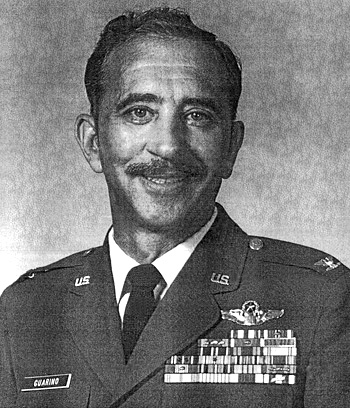
- Colonel Lawrence N. Guarino
- Born: April 16, 1922; Newark, New Jersey
- Died: August 18, 2014 (aged 92); Indian Harbor Beach, Florida
- Burial place: Arlington National Cemetery
- Military career
- Allegiance: United States
- Branch: United States Air Force
- Service years: 1942–1975
- Rank: Colonel
- Nickname: Larry
- Units: 31st Fighter Group; 44th Tactical Fighter Squadron
- Conflicts: World War II; Korean War; Vietnam War
- Awards: Air Force Cross; Air Force Distinguished Service Medal; Silver Star (2); Legion of Merit; Distinguished Flying Cross (2); Bronze Star Medal (3); Purple Heart (2); Air Medal (15)

Lawrence Nicholas "Larry" Guarino (April 16, 1922 – August 18, 2014) was a United States Air Force officer, and veteran of three wars. Shot down on his 50th combat mission, he spent more than eight years as a prisoner of war (POW) during the Vietnam War and earned the Air Force Cross.

As a POW at Hỏa Lò Prison (the "Hanoi Hilton"), he shared a cell with John McCain, the future senior United States senator from Arizona and Republican nominee for president in the 2008 United States election. Guarino wrote A P.O.W.'s Story: 2801 Days in Hanoi about his experiences in captivity.

Guarino flew the Supermarine Spitfire in World War II. His last duty station was Patrick Air Force Base and he retired to Satellite Beach and Indian Harbour Beach, Florida, after leaving the Air Force. He died on August 18, 2014.

== Awards and decorations ==
Lawrence Guarino's ribbons as they appeared at retirement:

Command Pilot Badge

Air Force Cross
Air Force Distinguished Service Medal
Silver Star with bronze oak leaf cluster
Legion of Merit
Distinguished Flying Cross with V device and bronze oak leaf cluster
Bronze Star Medal with V device and two bronze oak leaf clusters
Purple Heart with bronze oak leaf cluster
Air Medal with two silver and two bronze oak leaf clusters
Air Medal with bronze oak leaf cluster (second ribbon required for accouterment spacing)
Air Force Commendation Medal
Air Force Presidential Unit Citation
Air Force Outstanding Unit Award
Prisoner of War Medal
Combat Readiness Medal
Army Good Conduct Medal
American Campaign Medal
European-African-Middle Eastern Campaign Medal with two bronze campaign stars
Asiatic–Pacific Campaign Medal with bronze campaign star
World War II Victory Medal
National Defense Service Medal with bronze service star
Korean War Service Medal
Armed Forces Expeditionary Medal
Vietnam Service Medal with three silver and bronze campaign stars
Vietnam Service Medal with bronze campaign star (second ribbon required for accouterment spacing)
Korea Defense Service Medal
Air Force Longevity Service Award with silver oak leaf cluster
Small Arms Expert Marksmanship Ribbon
Armed Forces Reserve Medal
Republic of Vietnam Gallantry Cross
United Nations Service Medal for Korea
Vietnam Campaign Medal

=== Air Force Cross citation ===
Colonel Lawrence Nicholas Guarino
U.S. Air Force
Date Of Action: May 11, 1968 – September 22, 1969

The President of the United States of America, authorized by Section 8742, Title 10, United States Code, awards the Air Force Cross to Colonel Lawrence N. Guarino for extraordinary heroism in military operations against an opposing armed force as senior ranking officer of a North Vietnamese prison camp during the period 11 May 1968 to 22 September 1969. Following the execution of a carefully conceived escape plan by two of his officers, Colonel Guarino, who was known by the enemy to be the senior ranking officer in the camp, immediately came under maximum pressure including savage torture without parallel. Colonel Guarino exhibited exceptional heroism, courage, and determination during this period. Displaying great resilience when back in communication, he assumed command once again and slowly built the prisoner organization. Through his extraordinary heroism and maximum resistance in the face of a brutal enemy, he reflected the highest credit upon himself and the United States Air Force.

== See also ==
- When Hell was in Session
