= Danton (disambiguation) =

Georges Danton (1759–1794) was a leading figure in the early stages of the French Revolution.

Danton may also refer to:

== People ==
- Danton (name)

== Places ==
- Danton Township, Richland County, North Dakota
- Danton Pinch, former village in Kent, England, demolished for the Channel Tunnel

== Naval ships ==
- Danton-class battleship, in the French Navy
- French battleship Danton

== Films ==
- Danton (1921 film), German film by Dimitri Buchowetzki
- Danton (1931 film), German film by Hans Behrendt
- Danton (1932 film), French film by André Roubaud
- Danton (1970 film), UK television film by John Howard Davies, starring Anthony Hopkins
- Danton (1983 film), French/Polish film starring Gérard Depardieu and Anne Alvaro, directed by Andrzej Wajda
