= Danton (name) =

Danton is a French given name that is a form of Antoine, Titouan, D'Anton and Antonin used in France, Switzerland, Belgium, Canada, West Greenland, Haiti, French Guiana, Madagascar, Benin, Niger, Burkina Faso, Ivory Coast, Guinea, Senegal, Mauritania, Western Sahara, Morocco, Algeria, Tunisia, Chad, Central African Republic, Cameroon, Equatorial Guinea, Gabon, Republic of the Congo, Democratic Republic of the Congo, Burundi, and Rwanda. As a surname, it is unrelated to Antonius-related names, but rather people from Anthon, Isère. Notable people with this name include the following:

== Given name ==
- Danton Cole (born 1967), American hockey player
- Danton Heinen (born 1995), Canadian hockey player
- Danton Mello (born 1975), Brazilian actor
- Danton Remoto (born 1963), Filipino writer, essayist, reporter, editor, columnist, & professor
- Danton Stone, American actor

== Nickname ==
- Robert Bodanzky, also known as Danton (1879–1923), Austrian journalist, playwright and poet

== Surname ==
- Christine Danton, Australian contortionist
- Georges Danton (1759–1794), French Revolutionary
- Henry Danton (1919–2022), British dancer
- Mike Danton (born 1980), Canadian former professional ice hockey player
- Ray Danton (1931–1992), American actor, director and producer

== Fictional character ==
- Danton Black, minor DC Comics character

== See also ==
- Danton (disambiguation)
- D'Anton Lynn (born 1989), American football coach
- Dainton (disambiguation)
- Denton (disambiguation)
- Denton (surname)
