= Jon Denton =

Profile
- Position: Quarterback

Personal information
- Born: c. 1978
- Listed height: 6 ft 3 in (1.91 m)
- Listed weight: 215 lb (98 kg)

Career information
- High school: Green Valley (Henderson, NV)
- College: UNLV (1996–1997): Eastern Kentucky (1998)

Career history
- Edmonton Eskimos (1999)*; Miami Dolphins (1999)*
- * Offseason or practice squad member only

Jon Denton (born c. 1978) is a former American football quarterback. He played college football at UNLV in 1996 and 1997 and at Eastern Kentucky in 1998. He broke multiple NCAA freshman passing records in 1996.

== Early life ==
Denton attended middle school in Reno, Nevada, and then attended Green Valley High School in Henderson, Nevada.

== UNLV ==
As a freshman in 1996, Denton was the starting quarterback for a UNLV team that compiled a 1–11 record. He ranked among the leading quarterbacks in major-college football with 506 pass attempts (1st), 3,591 passing yards (5th), 25 passing touchdowns (8th), and 16 passing interceptions (4th). He broke NCAA freshman single-game and season records witn 503 passing yards in a game, 513 yards of total offense in a game, and 3,591 passing yards for the season. An Associated Press article noted that playing for a team with no running game and a defense that gave up 46 points a game led to a simple strateby, "pass, pass, pass", and turned Denton into "one of the best quarterbacks in the country."

As a sophomore in 1997, Denton was the starting quarterback for a UNLV team that went 3–8. He again ranked among the national passing leaders but was suspended in late October for violating a team rule. He was the leading passer in the WAC with 2,586 passing yards and 287.3 yards gained per game played with 18 passing touchdowns and 17 passing interceptions. At the time, his 6,177 passing yards and 43 passing touchdowns in two years at UNLV ranked second in program history behind Randall Cunningham.

Denton was dismissed from the UNLV football program in February 1998 after a failed drug test.

== Eastern Kentucky ==
In 1998, Denton transferred to Eastern Kentucky University. He passed for 1,844 yards, led the conference in passing efficiency, and set an Eastern Kentucky record with 18 touchdown passes. He was suspended prior to the final game for curfew violations, and head coach Roy Kidd stated at the end of the season that Denton would not be welcomed back in 1999.

== Professional football ==
Denton declared for the 1999 NFL draft but was not selected. He joined the Edmonton Eskimos of the Canadian Football League in the summer of 1999 but left "for personal reasons." In July 1999, he signed a free-agent contract with the Miami Dolphins. He did not make the Dolphins' final 1999 roster.
