= Danton Pinch =

Former village in Kent, England

Coordinates: 51.095828°N 1.127635°E

- Location within Kent
- Population: 0
- District: Folkestone and Hythe
- Shire county: Kent
- Region: South East
- Country: England
- Sovereign state: United Kingdom
- Police: Kent
- Fire: Kent
- Ambulance: South East Coast
- UK Parliament: Folkestone and Hythe

Danton Pinch was a small hamlet in Kent, England situated north-west of Folkestone. Its location is now within the confines of the Channel Tunnel development.

The village itself was demolished and the land regenerated during the period of 1988–1994. The only remaining evidence of its original existence is a small tree-lined lane known as Danton Lane which lies to the north of the Channel Tunnel site.

A fortified house was built in Danton Pinch during the Second World War, however as with the village, it no longer exists. The barn at the Danton Farm was partially relocated and now forms part of the Elham Valley Railway Museum.

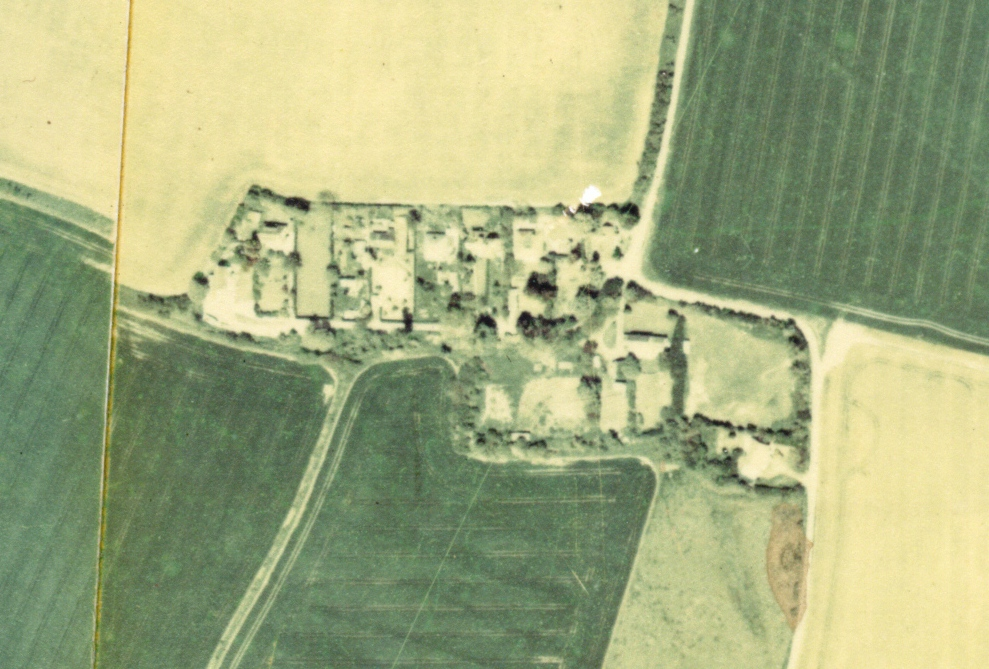
A Satellite view of now-demolished hamlet of Danton Pinch, Folkestone, Kent, United Kingdom
