= Denton Airport (disambiguation) =

Denton Airport (FAA LID: 5U0) is in Denton, Montana, U.S.

Denton Airport may also refer to:

- Denton Enterprise Airport (ICAO: KDTO, FAA LID: DTO), also known as Denton Airport and previously Denton Municipal Airport, in Denton, Texas, U.S.
- Jeremiah Denton Airport (FAA LID: 4R9), formerly Dauphin Island Airport, in Mobile County, Alabama, U.S.
