= Joshua Muravchik =

American political scholar (born 1947)

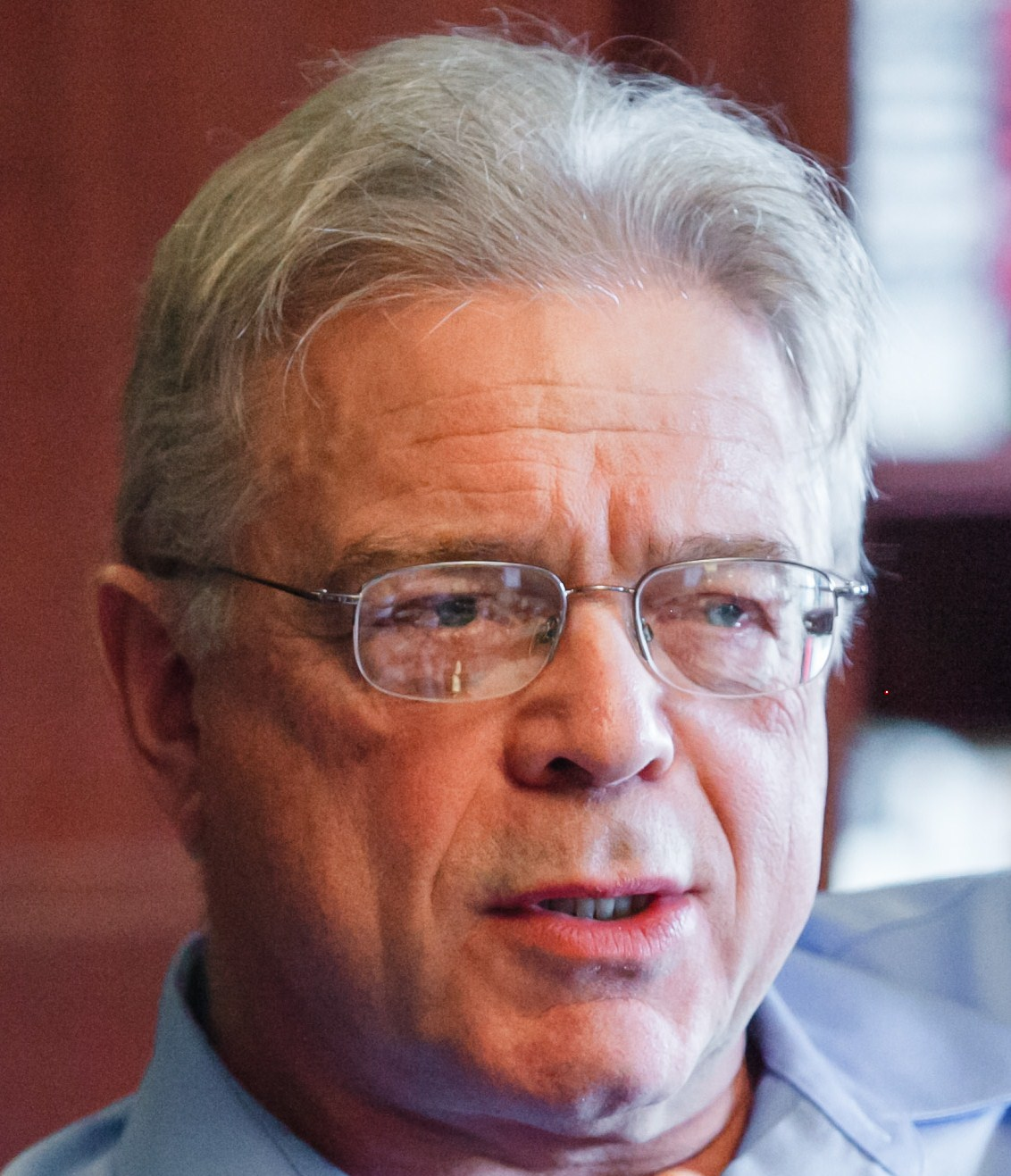
- Muravchik in 2013
- Born: September 17, 1947 (age 78); New York City
- Occupation: Political scholar
- Organization: World Affairs Institute
- Movement: Neoconservatism

Joshua Muravchik (born September 17, 1947, in New York City) is a neoconservative political scholar. He resides in Washington, DC based World Affairs Institute, he is also an adjunct professor at the DC based Institute of World Politics (since 1992) and a former fellow at the Foreign Policy Institute of Johns Hopkins University's School of Advanced International Studies (SAIS) (2009 – 2014). He was formerly a fellow at the George W. Bush Institute (2012–2013), a resident scholar at the American Enterprise Institute (1987–2008), and a scholar in residence at the Washington Institute for Near East Policy (1985).

Muravchik was one of the group of writers who moved away from the political left in the 1960s and 1970s and came to be called neoconservatives. In 1986, a Wall Street Journal editor wrote: "Joshua Muravchik may be the most cogent and careful of the neoconservative writers on foreign policy." Muravchik wrote in defense of neoconservative position when it became controversial during the years of George W. Bush’s presidency.

Since his transition to neoconservatism, much of Muravchik's work has focused on defending Israel from critics on the left – he opposes a Palestinian right of return on the grounds that it will upset the Jewish character of Israel's demographics – and advocating for military action against Iran (in 2006, 2011 and 2015 he authored op-eds advocating for a pre-emptive strike against Iran).

== Early life ==
Muravchik was born September 17, 1947 in New York City. His father, Emanuel Muravchik, was a leading American Jewish socialist.

Joshua Muravchik initially adopted his father's political leanings– he was National Chairman of the Young People's Socialist League (YPSL) from 1968 to 1973, and executive director of the Coalition for a Democratic Majority from 1977 to 1979. He was also an aide to the late Congressman James G. O'Hara (D-Mich.) in 1975 and to the late Senator Daniel Patrick Moynihan (D-NY) in 1977 and as a campaign aide to the late Senator Henry M. Jackson in his pursuit of the 1976 Democratic presidential nomination.

== Career ==
Muravchik received an undergraduate degree from City College of New York (1970) and a Ph.D in international relations from Georgetown University (1984). He also received an honorary doctorate from the Aurel Vlaicu University of Romania (2004). In 1998, he received a citation from the Polish parliament for his activities on behalf of Solidarity.

Muravchik serves on the board of trustees and the executive committee of Freedom House. In 1995, he became a founding member of the Foundation for Democracy in Iran, a non-profit organization established with grants from the National Endowment for Democracy. In 2006, Muvarchik had an opinion piece published in the Los Angeles Times entitled "Bomb Iran". In it, he argues that the prospect of Iranians overthrowing their government seemed "even more remote today than it did a decade ago", compared the Iranian government to the Bolsheviks and the Nazis, and claimed that Iran was harboring Al Qaeda.

He was a member of the State Department's Advisory Committee on Democracy Promotion from 2002 to 2009, and a member of the Commission on Broadcasting to the People's Republic of China in 1992. He served on the Maryland State Advisory Committee of the United States Commission on Civil Rights from 1985 to 1997. He is a member of the editorial boards of World Affairs, Journal of Democracy, and The Journal of International Security Affairs, as well as being an Advisory Editor at Fathom.

Muravchik argued in The Washington Post that the United States should attack Iran, stating: "Does this mean that our only option is war? Yes, although an air campaign targeting Iran's nuclear infrastructure would entail less need for boots on the ground than the war Obama is waging against the Islamic State, which poses far smaller a threat than Iran does."

== Bibliography ==
Muravchik is the author of 11 books, of which the most noted have been Making David Into Goliath: How the World Turned Against Israel (2014), Heaven on Earth: The Rise and Fall of Socialism (2002), and Exporting Democracy: Fulfilling America's Destiny (1991). Making David Into Goliath was featured on C-SPAN in July and August 2014. He has also authored hundreds of articles in magazines, journals, and newspapers touching on international politics, U.S. foreign policy, socialism, democracy, political ideology, the UN, and the Arab/Israel conflict.

- Making David Into Goliath: How the World Turned Against Israel, Encounter Books, 2014, 281 pages, ISBN 978-1-59403-735-1
- Liberal Oasis: The Truth About Israel, Encounter Books, 2014, ebook, 66 pages,
- Trailblazers of the Arab Spring: Voices of Democracy in the Middle East, Encounter Books, 2013, 420 pages, ISBN 978-1-59403-679-8
- Heaven on Earth: The Rise and Fall of Socialism, Encounter Books, 2002, hardcover, 417 pages, ISBN 1-893554-45-7
- The Imperative of American Leadership, The AEI Press, 1996
- Exporting Democracy: Fulfilling America's Destiny, The AEI Press, 1991, hardcover, 262 pages, ISBN 0-8447-3733-X
