= George Denton =

George Denton may refer to:

- George K. Denton (1864–1926), U.S. Representative from Indiana
- George Chardin Denton (1851–1928), British colonial administrator and military officer
- George H. Denton (born 1939), professor of geology
- George Denton (naturalist) (1833–1910), driving force behind the Wellington Acclimatisation Society in New Zealand
