= Denton Homestead =

Historic house in New York, United States

- U.S. National Register of Historic Places
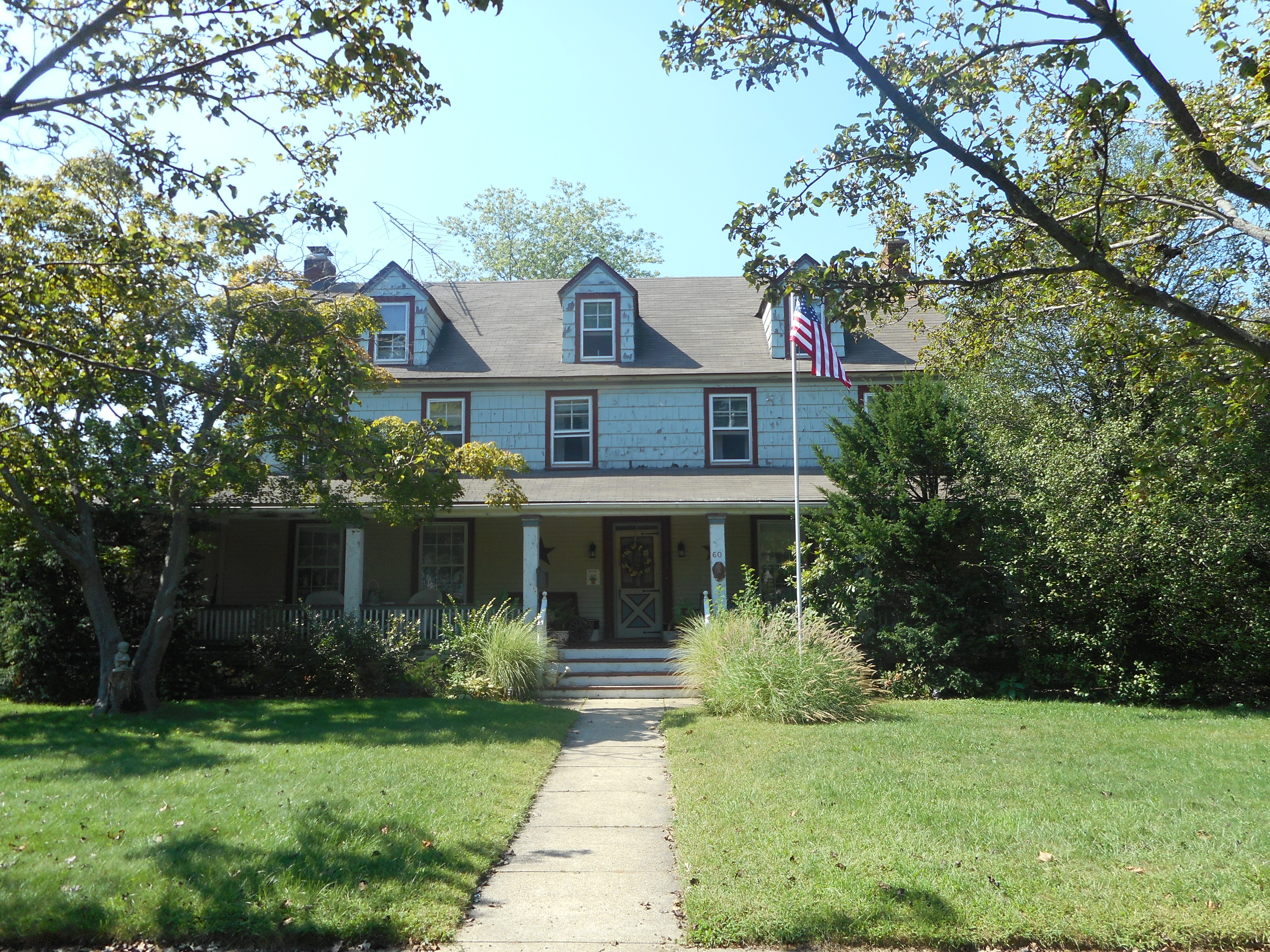
- Denton Homestead, September 2015

- Location within New York Location within the United States
- Location: 60 Denton Ave., East Rockaway, New York
- Coordinates: 40°38′33″N 73°39′45.72″W
- Area: 0.46 acres (0.19 ha)
- Built: c. 1795, c. 1900, 1924
- Architectural style: Colonial, Colonial Revival
- NRHP reference No.: 14000913
- Added to NRHP: November 12, 2014

Denton Homestead is a historic home located at East Rockaway in Nassau County, New York. It was built as a tavern about 1795, and is a 1 1/2-story, five-bay, center-hall-plan, vernacular Colonial style frame dwelling. The Denton family bought it in 1808 and converted to a residential farmhouse. It has a side-gable roof and a hipped roof addition added after the house was moved to its present location in 1924. The front facade features a full-width, shed-roofed front porch. The interior features some Colonial Revival style design elements. Also on the property is a contributing carriage house (c. 1900). The house is a rare surviving former tavern and farmhouse from the village's early period.

It was listed on the National Register of Historic Places in 2014.
