= Arthur Denton =

English cricketer

Arthur Donald Denton was an English cricketer active from 1914 to 1920 who played for Northamptonshire (Northants). He was born in Rushden, Northamptonshire on 21 October 1896 and died in Higham Ferrers, Northamptonshire on 23 January 1961. He appeared in seven first-class matches as a righthanded batsman who bowled underarm lobs. He scored 276 runs with a highest score of 51 not out and took no wickets.

He is notable for having played three first-class matches after losing part of his leg in World War I. He batted with one of his brothers as a runner, which required the permission of the opposing captain. "If any fellow has been to the war and has had his leg off and wants to play, he is good enough for me and can have 20 runners," the Lancashire captain wrote.
