= Oli Denton =

English rugby union player

- Born: 8 June 1990 (age 36) York, Yorkshire
- Height: 6 ft 1 in (185 cm)
- Weight: 12 st 8 lb (80 kg)

Rugby union career
- Position: Wing
Senior career
Years	Team	Apps	(Points)
2007–	Leeds Carnegie		

Oli Denton (born 8 June 1990) is a professional rugby union player for Leeds Carnegie. Denton was educated at St Peter's School, York and has plenty experience of playing rugby sevens.
