= David Denton (cricketer) =

English cricketer

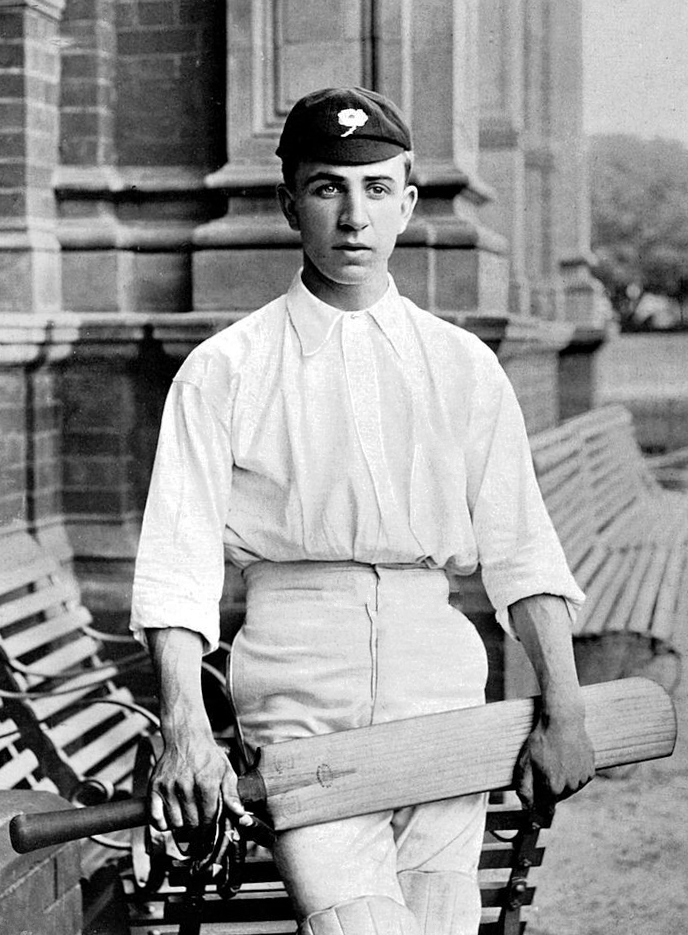
- David Denton

Personal information
- Full name: David Denton
- Born: 4 July 1874; Wakefield, Yorkshire, England
- Died: 16 February 1950 (aged 75); Wakefield, Yorkshire, England
- Batting: Right-handed
- Bowling: Right arm fast-medium

International information
- National side: England

Career statistics
| Competition | Tests | First-class |
|---|---|---|
| Matches | 11 | 741 |
| Runs scored | 424 | 36,440 |
| Batting average | 20.19 | 33.40 |
| 100s/50s | 1/1 | 69/187 |
| Top score | 104 | 221 |
| Balls bowled | 0 | 1,161 |
| Wickets | – | 34 |
| Bowling average | – | 28.91 |
| 5 wickets in innings | – | 1 |
| 10 wickets in match | – | 0 |
| Best bowling | – | 5/42 |
| Catches/stumpings | 8/– | 396/1 |
- Source: Cricinfo

David Denton (4 July 1874 – 16 February 1950) was an English first-class cricketer. An attacking batsman, he had a long career with Yorkshire and played eleven Tests for England. His nickname of 'Lucky' came from his habit of surviving the numerous chances that his attacking batting style created for the opposition. He was a fine deep fielder, and was said to be an excellent judge of a high catch, but did little bowling: his only really significant contribution with the ball came in 1896, when he took 5–42 against South of England. He also had one first-class stumping to his name, against Cambridge University in 1905.

== Career ==
Denton was born in Wakefield, Yorkshire, and showed promise as a teenager, scoring a half-century in a Colts game in 1892. After three friendly (but nevertheless first-class) matches for Yorkshire in 1894, he made his Championship debut for the county in Yorkshire's final game of the season against Somerset, though he did not bat, bowl or take a catch. The following year, he scored useful runs against Cambridge University and also Lancashire, to establish his place in the side. That year he made a thousand runs for the first time, only once thereafter (in 1898) failing to reach that landmark.

In 1905, Denton had a fantastic year, scoring 2,405 runs earning himself Wisden Cricketer of the Year recognition in the 1906 Almanack. Injury to Archie MacLaren resulted in Denton's elevation to the Test team in July 1905, to play against Australia at Headingley, Leeds, but he failed to make the most of his opportunity and was dismissed for 0 and 12, being dropped from the team immediately thereafter. He was recalled for the tour to South Africa that winter, and played in all five Tests. He made just one fifty in ten innings, and was again dropped from the side, but nevertheless played five more matches for England on a second and final tour of South Africa, in 1909/10. In the third Test at Johannesburg he made 104 at about a run a minute, but in no other innings did he even pass 30, and his England career came to a permanent end.

Denton continued to play with considerable success for Yorkshire until after World War I, making his highest score of 221 against Kent in 1912, and scoring 209 not out at Worcester as late as June 1920, just a month short of his 46th birthday. He retired at the end of that year, and though afflicted by ill-health for a time, recovered enough to stand as a first-class umpire regularly from 1925 to 1930, and in occasional matches until 1937.

He died at the age of 75 in the town of his birth. His older brother, Joe Denton, also had a brief first-class career with Yorkshire in 1887 and 1888.
