= Denton Castle =

- Denton, Norfolk, England
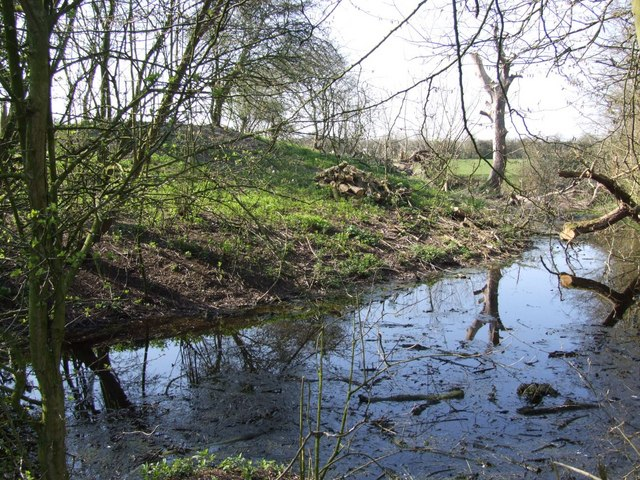
- Remaining earthworks of Denton Castle

Site information
- Type: Motte and bailey
- Condition: Earthworks only remain

Location
- Shown within Norfolk
- Coordinates: 52.4555°N 1.3309°E

Denton Castle is a motte and bailey castle built in the village of Denton, Norfolk, England.

== History ==
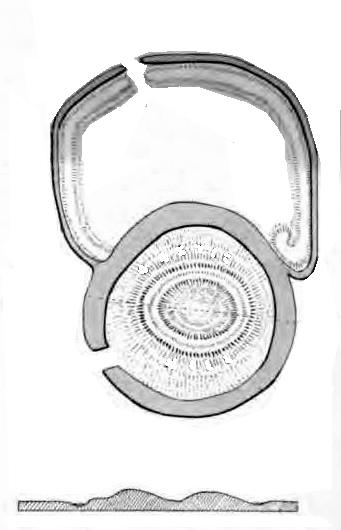
1884 plan and cross-section of Denton Castle

Denton Castle was built after 1088, following the Norman invasion of England, probably by William d'Albini, who linked his estate at Denton to that at Buckenham, where he also built a castle. The motte is around 150 feet in diameter, surrounded by a protective ditch, with an adjacent, horseshoe-shaped bailey. The castle may have been destroyed around 1254.

Today the castle is a scheduled monument. It was purchased by the National Trust in 1990 and forms part of the Trust's Darrow Wood pasture.

== See also ==
- Castles in Great Britain and Ireland
- List of castles in England

== Bibliography ==
- Manning, C.R. (1884) "Earthworks at the Castle-Hill, Darrow Wood, Denton, Norfolk," Norfolk Archaeology 9, pp. 335–342. doi:10.5284/1077469
