= USS Jeremiah Denton =

Guided missile destroyer

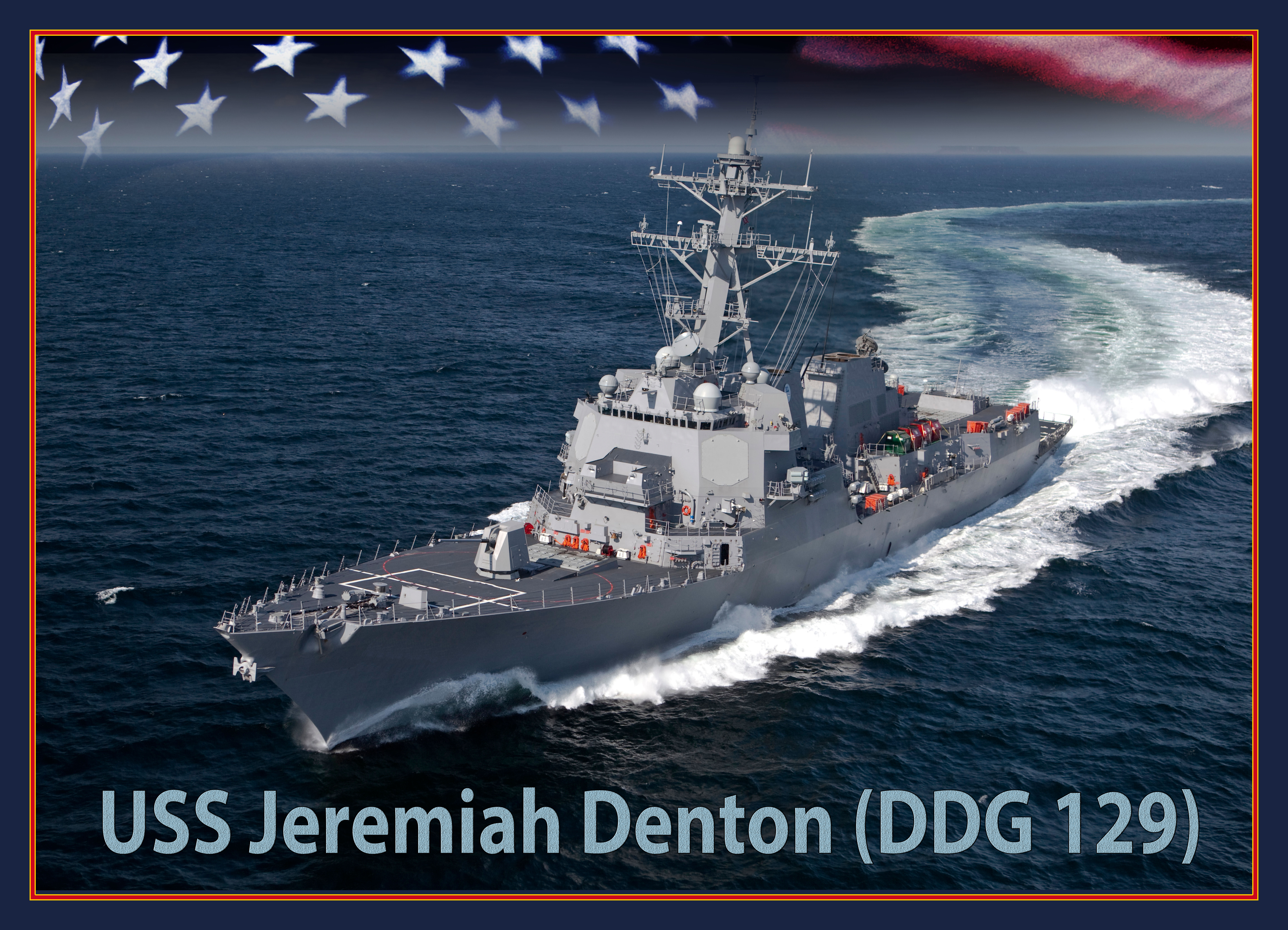
- Graphical depiction of USS Jeremiah Denton (DDG-129)

History

United States
- Name: USS Jeremiah Denton
- Namesake: Jeremiah Denton
- Awarded: 27 September 2018
- Builder: Huntington Ingalls Industries
- Laid down: 16 August 2022
- Launched: 25 March 2025
- Identification: Hull number: DDG-129
- Status: Launched
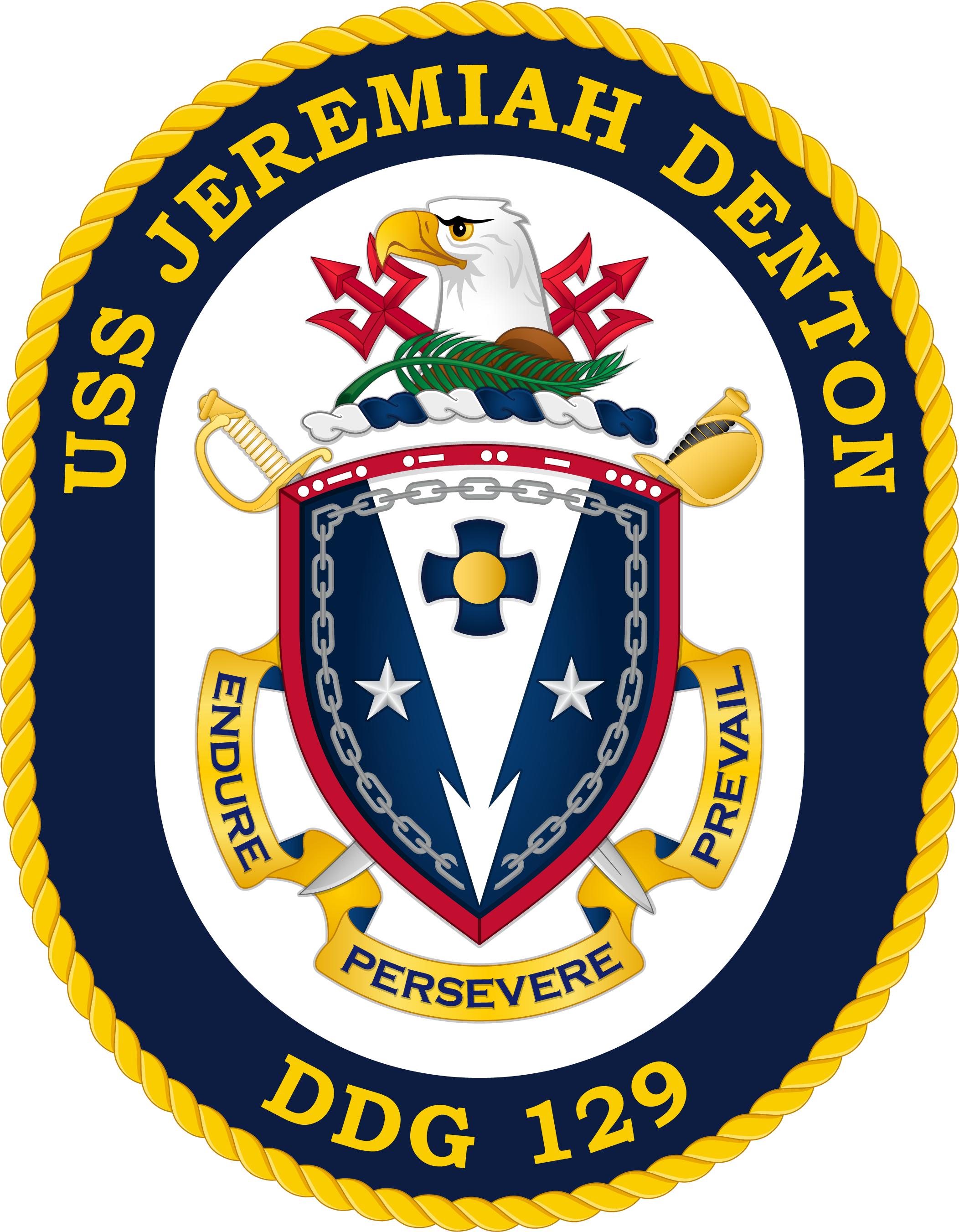
- Badge

General characteristics
- Class & type: Arleigh Burke-class destroyer
- Displacement: 9,217 tons (full load)
- Length: 510 ft (160 m)
- Beam: 66 ft (20 m)
- Propulsion: 4 × General Electric LM2500 gas turbines 100,000 shp (75,000 kW)
- Speed: 31 knots (57 km/h; 36 mph)
- Complement: 380 officers and enlisted
- Armament: Guns: 1 × 5-inch (127 mm)/62 Mk 45 Mod 4 (lightweight gun); 1 × 20 mm (0.8 in) Phalanx CIWS; 2 × 25 mm (0.98 in) Mk 38 machine gun system; 4 × 0.50 in (12.7 mm) caliber guns; Missiles: 1 × 32-cell, 1 × 64-cell (96 total cells) Mk 41 vertical launching system (VLS): RIM-66M surface-to-air missile; RIM-156 surface-to-air missile; RIM-174A Standard ERAM; RIM-161 anti-ballistic missile; RIM-162 ESSM (quad-packed); BGM-109 Tomahawk cruise missile; RUM-139 vertical launch ASROC; Torpedoes: 2 × Mark 32 triple torpedo tubes: Mark 46 lightweight torpedo; Mark 50 lightweight torpedo; Mark 54 lightweight torpedo
- Armor: Kevlar-type armor with steel hull. Numerous passive survivability measures.
- Aircraft carried: 2 × MH-60R Seahawk helicopters
- Aviation facilities: Double hangar and helipad

USS Jeremiah Denton (DDG-129) is an Arleigh Burke-class (Flight III) Aegis guided missile destroyer of the United States Navy, the fourth Flight III variant. She is named in honor of former U.S. Senator for Alabama and retired Rear Admiral Jeremiah Denton, a Vietnam War veteran and prisoner of war who was a recipient of the Navy Cross.

Huntington Ingalls Industries' Ingalls Shipbuilding division in Pascagoula, Mississippi launched the USS Jeremiah Denton on 25 March 2025.
