= Joe Denton =

English cricketer

Joe Denton (3 February 1865 – 17 July 1946) was an English first-class cricketer, who played fifteen matches for Yorkshire County Cricket Club in 1887 and 1888.

Born in Wakefield, Yorkshire, England, Denton was a right-handed batsman who scored 222 runs at an average of 9.65. The highlight of his playing career was his top score of 59 against Sussex. He reappeared for the Yorkshire Second XI in 1892.

His more famous brother, David Denton, played 11 Tests for England, 676 times for Yorkshire and was a Wisden Cricketer of the Year in 1906.

Denton died in Purston Jaglin, Yorkshire, in July 1946.
