= Thomas Denton =

Thomas Denton may refer to:

- Thomas Denton (died 1558), English lawyer and politician
- Thomas Denton (died 1633), English landowner and politician
- Tom Denton (rugby union) (born 1988), English rugby union player
- Tom Denton (footballer) (born 1989), English footballer
- Thomas Denton (MP for Leicester), in 1407 and 1414, MP for Leicester
- Thomas Denton (Shortland Street), a fictional character in the soap opera Shortland Street
