= John Bailey Denton =

British surveyor and civil engineer

- Born: 26 November 1814; London
- Died: 19 November 1893 (aged 78); Stevenage, Hertfordshire
- Known for: Railway surveying, water & sewage engineering, legislation, author
- Scientific career
- Fields: Surveyor, Civil engineer

John Bailey Denton (1814–1893) M. Inst. C.E.; F.G.S., was a British surveyor and civil engineer.

== Biography ==
When discussing the value of sewage, Denton records that Jean-Baptiste Boussingault, a chemist, demonstrated that a harvest of 800 pounds (360 kg) of wheat and 900 pounds (410 kg) of barley can be obtained from the nearly 16 pounds (7.3 kg) of nitrogen an adult's body-waste produces yearly. In addition, 9s (£50 in 2025) was calculated by Dr. Augustus Voelcker, the consulting chemist for the Royal Agricultural Society of England, to be the annual value of ammonia and phosphates excreted per head.

== Honorary ==
Honorary member of the R.A.S.S. of Denmark, Sweden, and Hanover.

== List of publications ==
This list is taken from ODNB and Works by Mr Bailey-Denton, M. Inst. C.E.; F.G.S., in Sewage Disposal (1895).

- (1842) What Can now be Done for British Agriculture?
- (1849) Sewerage of London
- (1854) Land Drainage and drainage Systems
- (1855) Underdrainage of Land; its progress and results (Society of Arts Medal)
- (1857) Road-Making (Prize Essay)
- (1858) The effect of Underdrainage on Arterial Channels and Outfalls
- (1863) The Discharge from Underdrainage (Telford Medal, Institution of Civil Engineers.)
- (1864) The Farm Homesteads of England
- (1865) The importance of Shelter and Covering at Homesteads in certain Districts of Great Britain
- (1865) The Marshes of South Italy
- (1866) The Water Question
- (1868) The Agricultural Labourer
- (1869) Sanitary Works
- (1870) Sewage Farming
- (1871) Sewage the Fertilizer of Land, and Land the Purifier of Sewage
- (1872) Underdrainage and the steps taken to develop and maintain its effects
- (1873) Intermittent Downward Filtration and Irrigation
- (1874) Sanitary Science applied to Towns and Rural Districts
- (1874) Storage of Water
- (1877) Sanitary Engineering
- (1881) Sewage Disposal
