= James S. Denton =

American publisher (1951–2018)

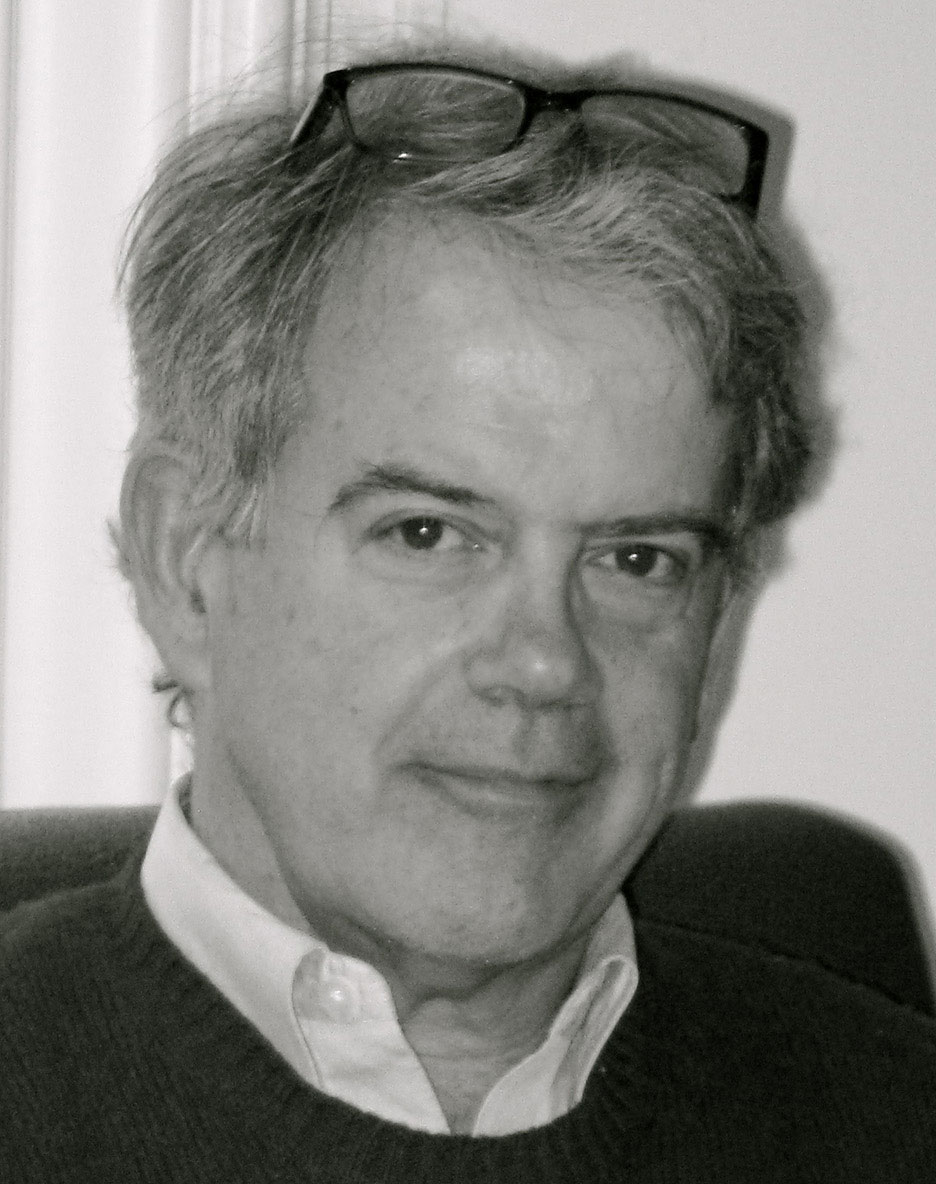
- Born: James Steele Denton; July 5, 1951; Lakehurst, New Jersey
- Died: June 22, 2018 (aged 66); Washington, D.C.
- Occupation: Journal publisher
- Spouse: Marilyn Grisham (m. 1976)
- Children: 2
- Parents: Jeremiah Denton (father); Jane Maury (mother)

James Steele Denton (July 5, 1951 – June 22, 2018) was the publisher and editor of World Affairs and the director of the World Affairs Institute in Washington, D.C. Previously Denton was the executive director of Heldref Publications, founded by Jeane J. Kirkpatrick and her husband Evron.

== Early life ==
Denton was the son of Jeremiah Denton, a United States Navy Rear Admiral and U.S. Senator from Alabama, and Jane Maury. James Denton grew up on military bases and finished high school in Virginia Beach. He graduated from Elon College in 1973. He went to Officer Candidate School and served in the Navy until 1979. After employment with a travel business in Norfolk, he moved to Washington, D.C.

== Career ==
Denton was the director of the National Forum Foundation from 1984 to 1997, and executive director of Freedom House from 1997 to 2001. He negotiated and directed the merger of the two organizations in June 1997.

He designed, developed, and implemented a portfolio of democratization programs that were active in over 30 countries, mostly in the former communist bloc. In addition, he launched a US-supported grant-making program in Eastern Europe to enhance the competence and influence of emerging human rights groups, independent media and think tanks.

He was awarded the Merit of Order by the President of Romania, a special commendation from the Polish government, as well as a commendation from the Coordinating Group of the Serbian Opposition for his support of their successful effort to overthrow Slobodan Milosevic.

In a consulting capacity, he represented Lech Wałęsa, Viktor Orbán, and Zoran Đinđić, and also consulted to the OSCE, ABC News, North Carolina Ballet, The Corporation for Public Broadcasting, The Folger Shakespeare Library, The Twentieth Century Foundation (Budapest), The National Democratic Institute, The Open Society Institute, and The Claremont Institute.

From 2004 to 2006, he developed and implemented the America at a Crossroads initiative—a 20-hour nationally broadcast series of television documentaries that explored the challenges and opportunities America faces in the wake of the September 11 attacks.

Denton authored, edited and published books, reports and articles on human rights, democratic development, and terrorism. He is the author of Grinning with the Gipper (Atlantic Monthly Press), which showed how Ronald Reagan popularized his views with humor. He also worked as a speechwriter for Bob Dole's presidential campaign.

In November 2017 Denton received an Honorary Silver Medal of Jan Masaryk from the Ministry of Foreign Affairs of the Czech Republic.

== Personal life ==
Denton married Marilyn Grisham in 1976, and they had two children. On June 22, 2018, Denton died at his home in Washington, D.C. from prostate cancer at age 66.
