= William Denton =

William Denton may refer to:

- William Denton (Arkansas politician), state legislator in Arkansas
- William Denton (English politician), 16th century English politician and Member of Parliament for Midhurst (UK Parliament constituency)
- William Denton (cricketer), early 20th century English cricketer for Northamptonshire
- William Denton (physician), 17th century English physician to Charles I and Charles II
- Bill Denton, early 20th century American artistic gymnast

== See also ==
- William Denton Cox
