= Denton House =

Denton House may refer to:

- Denton House (Maryland), a house in Chestertown, Maryland
- Denton House (New Hyde Park, New York), a historic house in New Hyde Park, New York

== See also ==
- Denton Hall, Wharfedale, Yorkshire, England, an 18th century country house
- Denton Manor, Lincolnshire, England, a Victorian country house
- George W. Denton House, a historic in Flower Hill, New York
