= World Affairs Institute =

Political nonprofit organization

World Affairs Institute (WAI) was a nonprofit organization established in 2010 and located in Washington, DC. The organization's stated mission is to "promote democratic governance as well as public education, awareness, and dialogue on international affairs and security issues through publications and non-partisan public education activity." The president of World Affairs Institute was James S. Denton. WAI's formative board includes James S. Denton, P.J. O'Rourke, and Alan Dye.

== World Affairs ==
WAI publishes World Affairs, a bimonthly print magazine established in 1837. The journal covers foreign policy and security issues. Its website provides essays from the print journal, as well as blogs and online features in addition to international news, opinion, and research that is aggregated from media, think tanks, and governments around the world.

== Transatlantic Renewal Initiative ==
The Transatlantic Renewal Initiative (TRI) is a project of the World Affairs Institute (WAI), established in February 2014 with the stated purpose of supporting stronger ties between the United States and its allies in Europe and the promotion of “an international order based on rule of law, political and economic freedom, human rights, and the expansion of prosperity.” The project states that its goal is “to re-center the importance of the [transatlantic] partnership and to reinvigorate ties between American policy and opinion leaders and their counterparts in Europe that have been frayed in the post-9/11 era while America and Europe were distracted by wars in Afghanistan and Iraq, the struggle against global terrorism, nuclear proliferation, economic upheaval and stagnation, China’s rise, and chaos in the Arab world. At its launch the TRI stated that it planned to use seminars, fact-finding delegations, fellowships and scholarships, and other means to meet its goal of promoting “close and informed ties between the US and the EU/CEE,” including participants from Russia, and Ukraine. The project is jointly funded by US and European private and government sources and lists Lorne Craner, James S. Denton, and Jeffrey Gedmin as its co-directors.

== MENA Democracy Fellows Program ==
In July 2011, WAI launched the MENA Democracy Fellows Program. The program was designed to support the democratic transition in Egypt and Tunisia as well as to promote better understanding, communications, and cooperation between the countries and the United States. The program awarded fellowships to emerging leaders from the region who actively promoted democratic governance or independent media in their countries. During the two-month fellowship program in the United States the participants worked in the US Congress, think tanks, or media outlets. Formal advisers to the program included Members of Congress, experts, and journalists from the US and abroad, including Congressman David Dreier (R- CA; Chairman of the House Rules Committee) and Congressman John Larson (D- CT; Chairman of the House Democratic Caucus), Deborah Harding (former VP of the Soros Foundation), and journalists/experts, Alaa Al Aswany, Khaled Dawoud, Michele Dunne, former Ambassador Eric Edelman, Roya Hakakian, Tom Gjelten (NPR), Joshua Muravchik, Jim Sciutto, Nabil Shawkat, and Ambassador Michael Žantovský.
