= Foundation for Democracy in Iran =

American non-profit organization

The Foundation for Democracy in Iran is an American private, non-profit organization established in 1995 with grants from the National Endowment for Democracy (NED), to promote regime change in Iran. The former board members of this NGO are David M. Beasley, Joshua Muravchik, Peter W. Rodman, and Dr. Mehdi Rouhani.

James Woolsey and Frank Gaffney are among its advisory board. Its website delivers news and intelligence concerning Iran.
