= Denton (given name) =

Denton is a masculine given name which may refer to:

- Denton Brock (born 1971), English former cricketer
- Denton Cooley (1920–2016), American heart surgeon
- Denton Daley (born 1982), Canadian former professional boxer
- Denton Darrington (born 1940), American politician
- Denton Fox (1947–2013), American football player
- Denton D. Lake (1887–1941), American politician
- Denton Lotz (1939–2019), American pastor and general secretary of the Baptist World Alliance
- Denton Massey (1900–1984), Canadian engineer, Anglican priest and politician
- Denton Mateychuk (born 2004), Canadian National Hockey League player
- Denton Offutt (1805–1860), American general store operator who gave future President Abraham Lincoln his first job
- Denton Thompson (1856–1924), Anglican Bishop of Sodor and Man
- Denton Vane (1890–1940), American film actor of the silent era
- Denton Vassell (born 1984), English former professional boxer
- Denton Welch (1915–1948), English author and painter
- Denton Cy Young (1867–1955), American baseball pitcher
- Denton Zubke (born 1954), American politician

== See also ==
- Dainton Connell (1961–2007), Arsenal hooligan leader, assistant to the Pet Shop Boys
