= Denton, Norfolk =

Village in Norfolk, England

Coordinates: 52.446175°N 1.355438°E

Denton
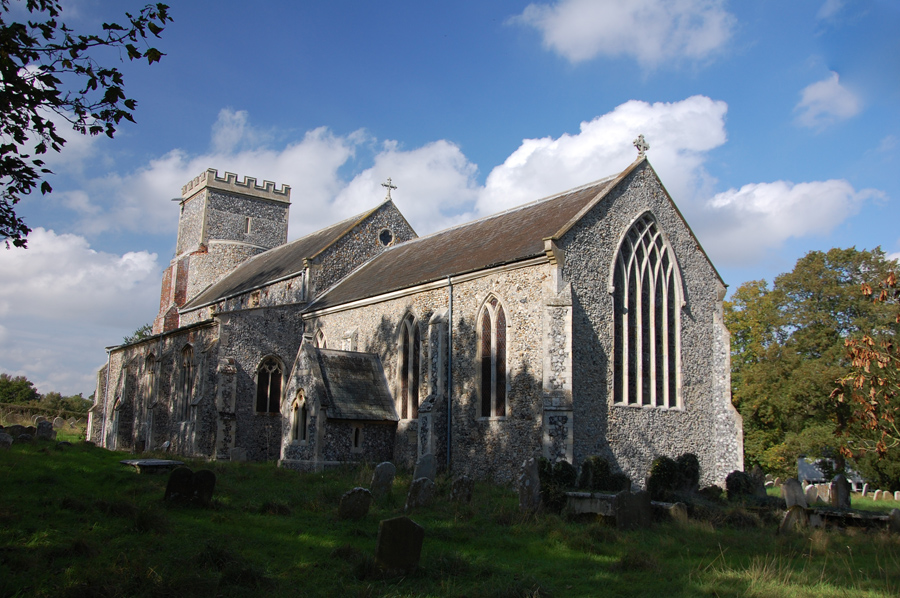
- St. Mary's Church

- Location within Norfolk
- Area: 10.10 km^{2} (3.90 sq mi)
- Population: 358 (2021)
  - Density: 35/km^{2} (91/sq mi)
- OS grid reference: TM281884
  - London: 90 miles
- Civil parish: Denton
- District: South Norfolk
- Shire county: Norfolk
- Region: East
- Country: England
- Sovereign state: United Kingdom
- Post town: HARLESTON
- Postcode district: IP20
- Dialling code: 01986
- Police: Norfolk
- Fire: Norfolk
- Ambulance: East of England
- UK Parliament: Waveney Valley
- Website: http://www.denton-norfolk.co.uk

Denton is a village and civil parish in the English county of Norfolk.

Denton is located 3.8 miles (6.1 km) north-east of Harleston and 13 miles (21 km) south of Norwich.

The Village Website - website = http://www.denton-norfolk.co.uk, contains a mass of information about the local community, past and present.

== History ==
Denton's name is of Anglo-Saxon origin and derives from the Old English for an enclosed farmstead or settlement in a valley.

In the Domesday Book, Denton is listed as a settlement of 49 households in the hundred of Earsham. In 1086, the village was divided between the estates of King William I and Eudo, son of Spirewic.

The village boundaries include the remaining earthworks of Denton Castle which was likely built in 1088 by William d'Albini and subsequently abandoned in 1254. Today, the castle is a scheduled monument and in the ownership of the National Trust.

On the Eastern edge of the village an extensive network of concrete tracks and platforms was built in 1942 and still exists. They were used to store bombs, supplied by train to the nearby Earsham station, before delivery to the US Army Air Force stations in the area, and then dropped over Germany.

== Geography ==
According to the 2021 census, Denton has a total population of 358 people which demonstrates an increase from the 326 people listed in the 2011 census.

The A143, between Gorleston-on-Sea and Haverhill, runs through the southern part of the parish.

== St. Mary's Church ==
Denton's parish church is dedicated to Saint Mary and dates from the Thirteenth Century. St. Mary's is located on Earsham Road and has been Grade I listed since 1959.

St. Mary's churchtower is of curious construction with the lower parts being made of flint and the upper parts being made of Victorian red brick. The interior of the church was restored in the Victorian era yet it still boasts stained-glass windows dating from the Sixteenth and Seventeenth Century, with were reset in the 1850s. St. Mary's also holds sets of royal arms from the reigns of Queen Victoria, King George III and Queen Elizabeth II.

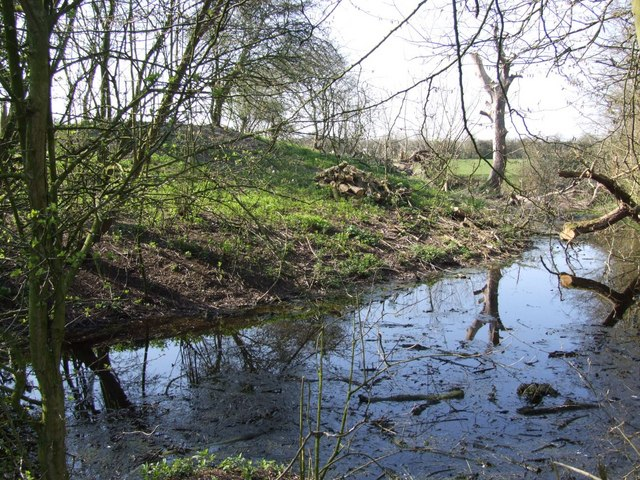
Castle Hill, Darrow Green

== Village Life ==
Denton won the 2008 Pride in Norfolk Award for a village under 500 people in population. The village went on to win the 2009 Calor Village of the Year competition. Denton is a very active community, with lots of Clubs etc. The Village Hall, with a licensed bar, provides an excellent location for many of these activities. Further details are provided on the Village Website.

== Governance ==
Denton is part of the electoral ward of Ditchingham & Earsham for local elections and is part of the district of South Norfolk.

The village's national constituency is Waveney Valley which has been represented by the Green Party's Adrian Ramsay MP since 2024.

== War Memorial ==
Denton's war memorial is a marble plaque inside St. Mary's Church. The memorial lists the following names for the First World War:

Rank	Name	Unit	Date of death	Burial/Commemoration
2Lt.	John W. C. Bolland	10th Bn., Norfolk Regiment	9 Apr. 1917	Faubourg Cemetery
LSt.	John Davison	HMS Princess Irene	27 May 1915	Chatham Naval Memorial
Cpl.	Ernest R. Wooltorton	2nd Bn., Norfolk Regiment	14 Apr. 1915	Basra War Cemetery
Pte.	William E. Aldrich	4th Bn., Bedfordshire Regiment	8 Oct. 1918	Noyelles Cemetery
Pte.	Benjamin C. Grimmer	5th Bn., Royal Berkshire Regiment	26 Jun. 1917	Appy Valley Cemetery
Pte.	Henry W. Beckett	17th Bn., Middlesex Regiment	17 Apr. 1917	Cologne Southern Cemetery
Pte.	Charles E. W. Oakley	1st Bn., Norfolk Regiment	4 Jun. 1916	Arras Memorial
Pte.	John Nobbs	11th Bn., Royal Sussex Regiment	17 Aug. 1917	Oak Dump Cemetery
Pte.	Samuel Barnes	9th Bn., Worcestershire Regiment	19 Jun. 1916	Basra War Cemetery

And, John J. Revell as well as the following for the Second World War:

Rank	Name	Unit	Date of death	Commemoration
Sapper	Jack Edward Sheldrake	Royal Engineers	11 March 1941	Brookwood Cemetery
