= Bellamy (surname) =

Bellamy is a surname of French origin, from the words beau/bel (good, fair, handsome) and ami (friend, companion, kinsman). Ultimately deriving from the Latin bellum/bellus and amicus. It could also be a local surname meaning "from Belleme".

Notable people with the surname include:

- Arthur Bellamy (1942–2014), English footballer
- Auzerais Bellamy, 21st century American pastry chef
- Béatrice Bellamy (1966–2026), French politician
- Benjamin Bellamy (1891–1985), English first-class cricketer
- Benjamin Plim Bellamy (1782–1847), English thespian
- Bert Bellamy (1896–1978), English footballer
- Bill Bellamy (born 1965), American actor, stand-up comedian, and MTV host
- Carol Bellamy (born 1942), American activist
- Charles Bellamy (fl.1717–1720), English pirate
- Charlotte Bellamy (born 1973), English actress
- Craig Bellamy (born 1979), Welsh footballer
- Craig Bellamy (rugby league) (born 1959), Australian rugby league coach
- Daniel Bellamy, the elder (born 1687), English writer
- Daniel Bellamy, the younger (died 1788), English divine and miscellaneous writer
- David Bellamy (1933–2019), British botanist and writer
- Davin Bellamy (born 1994), American football player
- Denise Bellamy (fl. 1998–1999), Canadian judge
- Diana Bellamy (1943–2001), American actress
- Dodie Bellamy (born 1951), American writer
- Earl Bellamy (1917–2003), American television and film director
- Edward Bellamy (1850–1898), American journalist, utopian, and writer of speculative fiction
- Francis Bellamy (disambiguation), multiple people
- François-Xavier Bellamy (born 1985), French philosopher and politician
- Frank Bellamy (1917–1976), British comics artist
- George Bellamy (disambiguation), multiple people
- Gordon Bellamy (born 1970), American game developer
- Hans Schindler Bellamy (1901–1982), Austrian author
- Jacobus Bellamy (1757–1786), Dutch poet
- James Bellamy (disambiguation), multiple people
- Jay Bellamy (born 1972), American football player
- Jayden Bellamy (born 2003), American football player
- Jerome Bellamy (died 1568), English Catholic
- John Bellamy (disambiguation), multiple people
- Joseph Bellamy (1719–1790), American theologian
- Josh Bellamy (born 1989), American football player
- June Rose Bellamy (1932–2020), the First Lady of Myanmar to Ne Win, 4th President of Burma
- Leslie Ballamy (1903–1991), automobile engineer, designer of split front suspension
- LeVante Bellamy (born 1996), American football player
- Madge Bellamy (1899–1990), American actress
- Matt Bellamy (born 1978), singer and guitarist with the rock band Muse
- Mike Bellamy (born 1966), American football player
- Ned Bellamy (born 1957), American actor
- Peter Bellamy (1944–1991), British musician
- Ralph Bellamy (1904–1991), American actor
- Richard Bellamy (disambiguation), multiple people
- Ron Bellamy (born 1964), American professional boxer
- Roscoe Bellamy (born 2000), American professional pickleball player
- Samuel Bellamy (1689–1717), early 18th-century pirate captain
- Sarah Bellamy (1770–1843), a convict on the First Fleet to Australia.
- Steven Bellamy (born 1950), British martial artist
- Thomas Bellamy (disambiguation), multiple people
- Tom Bellamy (born 1980), singer with The Cooper Temple Clause
- Tony Bellamy (1946–2009), lead guitarist, pianist and vocalist of the 1970s band Redbone
- Vic Bellamy (born 1963), American football player
- Walt Bellamy (1939–2013), American basketball player

== See also ==
- Bellamy (disambiguation), which includes among other things some fictional people called Bellamy
