= Beverly (name) =

Beverly or Beverley is a name and surname. It is derived from an English surname, which was in turn taken from the place name Beverley. The place name derives from Old English, combining befer (beaver) and leah (clearing).

It was at one time a common masculine given name, but is now almost exclusively a feminine name due to the popularity of a 1904 novel, Beverly of Graustark by George Barr McCutcheon. Its association with Beverly Hills, California, where many well known film actors live, might also have contributed to its usage in the United States.

== Usage ==
The name ranked among the 1,000 most popular names for newborn girls in the United States between 1905 and 1999 and was among the top 100 names for American girls between 1926 and 1964. It was at the peak of its popularity in 1937, when it was the 14th most popular name for newborn girls. It was also among the 1,000 most popular names for American boys at different points between 1880 and 1954.

It was among the top 100 names for newborn girls in Canada between 1929 and 1963, and among the top 100 names for newborn girls in New Zealand between 1930 and 1953. In 2023 the name was increasing again in usage, influenced by the popularity of similar sounding names such as Everly and Bellamy.

== People ==
=== Given name ===
- Beverly Aadland (1942–2010), American film actress
- Beverly Adams (born 1945), Canadian-American actress and author
- Beverly Afaglo (1983–2026), Ghanaian actress and television presenter
- Beverly Allen (born 1945), Australian botanical artist
- Beverley Allitt (born 1968), British serial killer of children
- Beverly Anderson (born 1943), American mathematician and professor
- Beverly Archer (fl. 1970s–2000s), American actress
- Beverly Armstrong (1934–2025), American girl's baseball pitcher
- Beverley Badenhorst, South African politician
- Beverley Bass (born c. 1951), American pilot
- Beverly Bayne (1894–1982), American actress
- Bev Bevan (born 1944), English rock musician
- Beverly A. Bodem (born 1940), member of the Michigan House of Representatives
- Beverly Boys (born 1951), Canadian diver
- Beverly Briley (1914–1980), mayor of Nashville, Tennessee (1963–1975)
- Beverly Caimen (born 1994), stage name Beverly, Filipino pop singer in Japan
- Beverly Chester-Burton (born 1963), American politician
- Beverley Cochrane Cayley (1898–1928), Canadian lawyer and mountaineer
- Beverly Cleary (1916–2021), American children's author
- Beverley Cressman, British actress
- Beverly A. Davis (1868–1944), American lawyer and politician
- Beverley Diamond (born 1948), Canadian pianist and feminist ethnomusicologist
- Beverly B. Douglas (1822–1878), United States Representative from Virginia
- Beverly M. Emerson, American biochemist
- Beverly Ann Ferrante, American politician
- Beverly Baker Fleitz (1930–2014), American tennis player
- Bev Forrester (born 1951 or 1952), New Zealand farmer and fashion designer
- Beverly A. Gage (died 1997), American politician
- Beverly Thomas Galloway (1863–1938), American plant pathologist
- Beverly Garland (1926–2008), American actress
- Beverley Garlick (born 1944), Australian architect
- Beverly Anne Giesbrecht (1953–2010), Canadian convert to Islam and web designer
- Beverley Goddard (born 1956), British sprinter
- Beverley Goodway (1943–2012), British glamour photographer
- Beverley Harper (1943–2002), Australian author of novels set in Africa
- Beverly Harvard (born 1950), American police chief
- Beverly Johnson (born 1952), American supermodel
- Beverley Knight (born 1973), English soul and R&B singer-songwriter, and stage actress
- Beverly Lindsay (fl. 2026), British travel agent and public figure
- Beverly B. Martin (born 1955), judge of the United States Court of Appeals for the Eleventh Circuit
- Beverley Randolph Mason (1834–1910), American educator
- Beverly McClellan (1969–2018), American singer, contestant in the first season of the American TV series The Voice
- Beverley McLachlin (born 1943), Canadian jurist and 17th Chief Justice of Canada
- Beverley Mitchell (born 1981), American actress and country music singer
- Beverly Mould (born 1962), South African tennis player
- Beverley Nichols (1898–1983), English author
- Beverly Penn (born 1955), American sculptor
- Beverley Randolph (1754–1797), eighth governor of Virginia
- Beverly Holcombe Robertson (1827–1910), U.S cavalry officer and Confederate general
- Beverly Robertson (athlete) (born 1940), New Zealand Olympic long jumper and sprinter
- Beverly Robertson (businesswoman) (born 1951), American businesswoman
- Beverley Shenstone (1906–1979), Canadian aerodynamicist
- Beverly Sills (1929–2007), American operatic soprano
- Beverly Burnsed Spencer (1941–2019), American politician and university administrator
- Beverly Washburn (born 1943), American actress
- Beverly Watkins (1939–2019), American blues guitarist
- Beverly Woolley (born 1939), American politician
- Beverly Wright (fl. 1990s–2020s), American environmental justice scholar
- Beverley Wybrow, Canadian women's rights activist

=== Surname ===
- Charles Beverly (1899–1981), American Negro league baseball player
- Charles James Beverley (1788–1868), British naval surgeon
- Cliff Beverley (born 1977), New Zealand rugby league player
- Frankie Beverly (1946–2024), American soul/funk singer-songwriter
- Gerald Beverly (born 1993), American basketball player
- Harry Beverley (rugby league, born 1907), English rugby league footballer
- Harry Beverley (rugby league, born 1947), English rugby league footballer
- Hattie Beverly (1874–1904), African-American school teacher
- Henry Roxby Beverley (1790–1863), English actor
- James R. Beverley (1894–1967), American lawyer and politician
- Jo Beverley (1947–2016), British novelist
- Nick Beverley (born 1947), Canadian former National Hockey League player and head coach
- Patrick Beverley (born 1988), American basketball player
- Peter Beverley (c. 1668–1728), colonial Virginia politician, Speaker of the Virginia House of Burgesses
- Robert Beverley Jr. (1673–1722), American historian
- Trazana Beverley, American actress
- William Beverley (1696–1756), American legislator, civil servant, planter and landowner

== Fictional characters ==
- Beverley Leslie, in the television series Will & Grace, played by Leslie Jordan
- Beverly Crusher, in the television series Star Trek: The Next Generation and related media
- Beverly Marsh, in Stephen King's novel It

== See also ==
- Margaret of Beverley, 12th-century Christian pilgrim and Crusader
