= Daniel Bellamy =

Daniel Bellamy may refer to:

- Daniel Bellamy, the elder (1687–?), English writer
- Daniel Bellamy, the younger (c. 1715–1788), English writer and divine
