= Belle Amie (disambiguation) =

Belle Amie is a British pop music girl group

The term belle amie is French for “beautiful female friend”.

Belle Amie or variation may also refer to:

- RTV Belle Amie, Nis, Nisava, Serbia; a TV station
- "Ma Belle Amie" (song), a 1969 single by Tee-Set off the eponymous album Ma Belle Amie
- Ma Belle Amie (album), a 1969 album containing the eponymous title track Ma Belle Amie, released by the Tee-Set
- La Belle Amie (character), a fictional character from the 1969 film The Assassination Bureau

== See also ==
- Amy Belle, Scottish singer
- Bel Ami (disambiguation)
- Bellamy (disambiguation)
