= Bellamy =

Bellamy or variation may refer to:

== Places in the United States ==
- Bellamy, Alabama, a census-designated place
- Bellamy, Missouri, an unincorporated community
- Bellamy, Virginia, an unincorporated community
- Bellamy River, a river in New Hampshire

== People ==
- Bellamy (surname), people with the surname Bellamy
- Bellamy Brown (1906–1998), British author
- Bellamy Hunt, English camera collector
- Bellamy Matt, lead singer of the band Muse
- Bellamy Partridge (1877–1960), American writer
- Bellamy Storer (ambassador) (1847–1922), American lawyer and politician
- Bellamy Storer (Ohio politician) (1796–1875), American politician
- Bellamy Young, actress from the ABC hit show Scandal

== Art, entertainment, and media ==
=== Fictional entities ===
- Bellamy (One Piece), a character from Eiichirō Oda's manga One Piece
- Elizabeth Bellamy, a fictional character in Upstairs, Downstairs
- Hazel Bellamy, a fictional character in Upstairs, Downstairs
- Howard Bellamy (Doctors), a character from the British soap opera Doctors
- Lady Marjorie Bellamy, a fictional character in Upstairs, Downstairs
- Bellamy Blake, a character from The 100 TV series

=== Other art, entertainment, and media ===
- Bellamy (film), a 2009 French film by Claude Chabrol
- Bellamy (TV series), Australian crime drama
- The Bellamy Brothers, an American country group most popular in the 1970s and 1980s

== Other uses ==
- Bellamy salute (U.S. Pledge of Allegiance)
- Bellamy's, the catering service of the New Zealand Parliament
- Bellamy's (UK Parliament catering facility)

== See also ==
- Bel Ami (disambiguation)
- Belle Amie (disambiguation)
