= 2026 Georgia State Panthers football team =

American college football season

2026 Georgia State Panthers football
- Conference: Sun Belt Conference
- East Division
- Record: 5–6 (2–5 Sun Belt)
- Head coach: Dell McGee (3rd season)
- Offensive coordinator: Hue Jackson (2nd season)
- Offensive scheme: Pro-style
- Co-defensive coordinators: Cam Clark (1st season); John Haneline
- Base defense: 1st
- Home stadium: Center Parc Stadium

2026 Sun Belt Conference football standings
	Conf.			Overall
Team	W		L	W		L
East Division
Georgia Southern	6	–	1	7	–	4
James Madison	5	–	2	8	–	3
Appalachian State	4	–	3	7	–	4
Coastal Carolina	3	–	4	4	–	7
Marshall	3	–	4	6	–	5
Georgia State	2	–	5	5	–	6
Old Dominion	2	–	5	3	–	8
West Division
Louisiana Tech xy	7	–	0	9	–	2
Louisiana	5	–	2	8	–	3
South Alabama	4	–	3	6	–	5
Arkansas State	2	–	5	4	–	7
Troy	2	–	5	4	–	7
Southern Miss	2	–	5	3	–	8
Louisiana–Monroe	2	–	5	2	–	9
Championship: TBD vs. Louisiana Tech
$ – Conference champion; x – Division champion/co-champions; y – Championship game participant; As of November 22, 2026; Rankings from AP poll

The 2026 Georgia State Panthers football team represent Georgia State University in the Sun Belt Conference's East Division during the 2026 NCAA Division I FBS football season. The Panthers are led by Dell McGee in his third year as the head coach. The Panthers play their home games at Center Parc Stadium, located in Atlanta, Georgia.

== Personnel ==
=== Roster ===
2026 Georgia State Panthers football team roster
Players
Coaches
Offense

Pos.	#	Name	Class
RB	0	Dennis Murray Jr.	Jr
QB	2	Ayden Pereira	5th
WR	4	Kyle Washington	So
RB	5	Lanear McCrary Jr.	Sr
TE	6	Wesley Campbell VI	5th
WR	7	Owen Dupree	Sr
QB	8	Cameran Brown	5th
WR	9	Rodshaun Dorsey	Sr
WR	10	DJ Riles	5th
TE	11	Matt Buron	5th
QB	12	Jadon Olafsson	So
WR	13	Derrick Avery Jr.	So
QB	14	TJ Stanley	So
QB	15	Gavin Nuckolls	Fr
WR	16	Jaylin Marshall	5th
WR	17	Isaiah Stone	Jr
WR	18	D'Ontae Fulton	So
WR	19	Jamari Miller	So
RB	20	Jamal Bing Jr.	Sr
RB	22	Xavier Butler	Fr
RB	24	Qwantavius Wiggins	Fr
RB	25	Tayo Ashadele	So
RB	28	Savion Hart	Jr
RB	32	Ladainnian Martin	So
RB	33	Jason Fisher	Jr
WR	38	Khalil Quinn	So
TE	44	Kyle Mullenix	So
OL	51	TJ Whitfield	Fr
OT	52	Donovan Funsch	Jr
OL	53	Malik Jackson	Jr
OL	54	Tyhler Williams	5th
OL	55	Gage Stanaland	Sr
OL	56	Deandre Duffus	Sr
OL	57	Kadorian Benjamin	Fr
OT	58	Maxwell Robinson	Fr
OL	65	Hunter Britt	So
OT	66	Braylin Roberts	So
OL	68	Peter Diaz	Jr
OL	70	Matthew Grow	Fr
OL	71	Aidan Andrews	So
OL	72	Kelton Smith	Sr
OL	73	Deylin Hasert	5th
OL	74	Pherleski Martin	So
OL	75	Marcus Mascoll	Jr
OL	76	Jordan Brown	5th
OT	77	James Wilson	Jr
WR	80	Ahmed Souare	So
TE	81	Avion McBride	5th
WR	82	Zach Stair	Fr
WR	84	Nathaniel Fernander	Fr
TE	85	Grant Hollier	So
WR	86	Keron Milton	Jr
WR	87	Austin McGee	Jr
WR	89	Amari Powell	Jr

Defense

Pos.	#	Name	Class
DT	0	Jonah Reeder	Sr
DE	1	Jabriel Rhodes-Nelson	Sr
S	3	Demonte Gaston	5th
OLB	4	Xavier Esqillion	Sr
S	7	Deuce Walker	Jr
S	8	Deuce Lee	Sr
ILB	9	Eric Butler Jr.	Jr
CB	11	Toby Bolton	Sr
CB	12	Darius Johnson Jr.	5th
S	13	Donovan Faria	So
S	15	Tre Mittman	Jr
S	16	Keenan Nelson	5th
S	17	Joseph Holt	So
CB	18	Andre Jocelyn	Jr
ILB	20	Coby Owens	Jr
S	21	Derrick Maxey III	Sr
S	22	Ty Snead	So
CB	24	Malique Harrell	Fr
CB	25	Monterrius Echols	Fr
CB	26	Jacorey Walker	Sr
ILB	27	Tyler Moore	So
ILB	28	Jaden Kelly	5th
ILB	30	Ryan Green	5th
CB	31	Ry'Sheed Fuller	Fr
CB	32	Tyson McCrary	So
ILB	33	Zachary Davis	So
ILB	34	Jaydon Hood	5th
OLB	35	Khalid Feliz	Fr
S	37	Josh Owens	Fr
SAF	38	Christon Jones	So
CB	39	Cade Dutton	Jr
ILB	41	Michael Fountain	Fr
OLB	43	Zion Lawson	So
DE	44	Freddie Wilson	Fr
OLB	45	Kelan Butler	So
ILB	46	Sean Ademokun	So
ILB	47	Chandler Covington	So
ILB	48	Zach Adams	Fr
DE	49	Timothy Dailey	Fr
DT	52	Alex Mullings	So
ILB	55	Antonio Wesley	Jr
DE	58	Kelze Howard	Sr
DT	59	Abdul Mohammed	Jr
DT	88	Kevin Norwood	Jr
DT	90	Zamar McGee	Fr
DT	92	AJ Vaughns	5th
DE	93	Aaron Moore	Fr
DT	94	Eli Richards	Fr
DE	95	Richard Kramer	Jr
DE	97	Isaac Tolliver	Fr
DT	98	Samuel Chukwurah	Jr
DT	99	Mandjou Berte	Sr

Special teams

Pos.	#	Name	Class
P	14	Christian Teeter	5th
K	26	Balint Vorosmarty	Fr
P/K	35	Landon Vargas	Fr
K	39	Samer Layous	So
LS	50	Braxton Kitchens	So
LS	60	Jackson Tolley	So

Head coach

- Dell McGee

Coordinators/assistant coaches

- Dameyune Craig – Assistant Head Coach/ Wide Receivers
- Hue Jackson – Offensive Coordinator
- Cam Clark – Co-Defensive Coordinator
- John Haneline – Co-Defensive Coordinator
- Zach Conowal – Special Teams Coordinator

Legend

- (C) Team captain
- (S) Suspended
- (I) Ineligible
- Injured
- Redshirt

Roster
Last update: 29 September 2026

== Schedule ==
Date	Time	Opponent	Site	TV	Result	Attendance
September 4	7:00 p.m.	North Carolina A&T*	Center Parc Stadium; Atlanta, GA	ESPN+	W 59–10	16,703
September 12	7:00 p.m.	at Kennesaw State*	Fifth Third Stadium; Kennesaw, GA	ESPN+	W 31–17	11,040
September 19	7:00 p.m.	at UCF*	Acrisure Bounce House; Orlando, FL	ESPN+	L 30–44	44,620
September 26	2:00 p.m.	Northern Illinois*	Center Parc Stadium; Atlanta, GA	ESPN+	W 35–14	16,608
October 3	3:30 p.m.	Old Dominion	Center Parc Stadium; Atlanta, GA	ESPN+	W 42–10	17,854
October 17	12:00 p.m.	at James Madison	Bridgeforth Stadium; Harrisonburg, VA	ESPNU	L 22–49	25,225
October 24	7:00 p.m.	at Arkansas State	Centennial Bank Stadium; Jonesboro, AR	ESPN+	L 32–38	17,767
October 31	2:00 p.m.	Coastal Carolina	Center Parc Stadium; Atlanta, GA	ESPN+	L 20–31	13,681
November 7	2:30 p.m.	at Appalachian State	Kidd Brewer Stadium; Boone, NC	ESPN+	W 39–23	31,944
November 14	3:30 p.m.	Georgia Southern	Center Parc Stadium; Atlanta, GA (Modern Day Hate)	ESPN+	L 17–34	19,452
November 21	4:00 p.m.	at Marshall	Joan C. Edwards Stadium; Huntington, WV	ESPN+	L 27–28	24,560
November 28	2:00 p.m.	Louisiana	Center Parc Stadium; Atlanta, GA	ESPN+		
*Non-conference game; All times are in Eastern time

== Game summaries ==
=== North Carolina A&T (FCS) ===
North Carolina A&T Aggies (FCS) (0–1) at Georgia State Panthers (0–0) – Game summary

Quarter	1	2	3	4	Total
Aggies (FCS)	0	7	0	3	10
Panthers	14	21	24	0	59

at Center Parc Stadium • Atlanta, Georgia

- Date: September 4
- Game time: 7:00 p.m.
- Game weather: Sunny
- Game attendance: 16,703
- Referee: Marty Adams
- TV announcers (ESPN+): Matt Stewart and Sam Crenshaw

Game information

First quarter

- GAST – Dennis Murray Jr. 30-yard pass from Cameran Brown (Samer Layous kick), 7:17. Panthers 7–0. Drive: 1 play, 30 yards, 0:06.
- GAST – Lanear McCrary Jr. 8-yard run (Samer Layous kick), 0:00. Panthers 14–0. Drive: 11 plays, 90 yards, 5:04.

Second quarter

- GAST – Qwantavius Wiggins 2-yard run (Samer Layous kick), 7:00. Panthers 21–0. Drive: 11 plays, 70 yards, 5:38.
- NCAT – Anthony Rucker 61-yard pass from Kevin White (Asher Holland kick), 5:12. Panthers 21–7. Drive: 4 plays, 75 yards, 1:48.
- GAST – Dennis Murray Jr. 14-yard run (Samer Layous kick), 2:38. Panthers 28–7. Drive: 5 plays, 58 yards, 2:28.
- GAST – Jamari Miller 8-yard pass from Cameran Brown (Samer Layous kick), 0:19. Panthers 35–7. Drive: 7 plays, 61 yards, 1:16.

Third quarter

- GAST – Ayden Pereira 17-yard run (Samer Layous kick), 11:38. Panthers 42–7. Drive: 6 plays, 60 yards, 3:15.
- GAST – Samer Layous 26-yard field goal, 8:52. Panthers 45–7. Drive: 6 plays, 0 yards, 1:28.
- GAST – Savion Hart 41-yard run, 6:20. Panthers 52–7. Drive: 1 play, 41 yards, 0:27.
- GAST – Xavier Butler 20-yard run (Balint Vorosmarty kick), 1:42. Panthers 59–7. Drive: 7 plays, 55 yards, 3:11.

Fourth quarter

- NCAT – Asher Holland 39-yard field goal, 9:04. Panthers 59–10. Drive: 13 plays, 53 yards, 7:38.

Statistics	NCAT	GAST
First downs	10	28
Plays–yards	53–209	71–563
Rushes–yards	30–84	38–284
Passing yards	125	279
Passing: comp–att–int	11–23–0	25–33–0
Turnovers	0	0
Time of possession	27:14	32:46

Team	Category	Player	Statistics
North Carolina A&T	Passing	Kevin White	9/20, 122 yards, TD
North Carolina A&T	Rushing	J.T. Smith	11 carries, 44 yards
North Carolina A&T	Receiving	Anthony Rucker	4 receptions, 80 yards, TD
Georgia State	Passing	Cameran Brown	15/20, 190 yards, 2 TD
Georgia State	Rushing	Lanear McCrary Jr.	9 carries, 75 yards, TD
Georgia State	Receiving	Dennis Murray Jr.	2 receptions, 50 yards, TD

=== at Kennesaw State ===
Georgia State Panthers (1–0) at Kennesaw State Owls (1–0) – Game summary

Quarter	1	2	3	4	Total
Panthers	6	15	7	3	31
Owls	3	0	8	6	17

at Fifth Third Stadium • Kennesaw, GA

- Date: September 12
- Game time: 7:00 p.m.
- Game weather: Sunny • Temperature: 95 °F (35 °C) • Wind: NE at 5 mph
- Game attendance: 11,040
- Referee: Brandon Kirkland
- TV announcers (ESPN+): Nolan Alexander (play-by-play), Caleb O'Neal (analyst) and Maria Martin (sideline reporter)

Game information

First quarter

- GAST – Samer Layous 41-yard field goal, 9:18. Panthers 3–0. Drive: 11 plays, 52 yards, 5:42.
- KENN – Daniel Kinney 29-yard field goal, 6:28. Tied 3–3. Drive: 6 plays, 64 yards, 2:43.
- GAST – Samer Layous 27-yard field goal, 1:28. Panthers 6–3. Drive: 12 plays, 66 yards, 5:00.

Second quarter

- GAST – Cameran Brown 18-yard run (Wesley Campbell IV–Ayden Pereira two-point pass), 12:02. Panthers 14–3. Drive: 4 plays, 43 yards, 2:49.
- GAST – Lanear McCrary Jr. 1-yard run (Samer Layous kick), 0:40. Panthers 21–3. Drive: 8 plays, 80 yards, 3:58.

Third quarter

- GAST – Dennis Murray Jr. 12-yard run (Samer Layous kick), 4:42. Panthers 28–3. Drive: 9 plays, 93 yards, 5:05.
- KENN – Rickie Collins 12-yard run (Brayden Munroe–Rickie Collins two-point pass), 0:53. Panthers 28–11. Drive: 3 plays, 65 yards, 1:06.

Fourth quarter

- GAST – Samer Layous 43-yard field goal, 9:15. Panthers 31–11. Drive: 12 plays, 51 yards, 6:38.
- KENN – Jamari Harrold 3-yard pass from Rickie Collins (pass failed), 1:56. Panthers 31–17. Drive: 10 plays, 72 yards, 3:35.

Statistics	GAST	KENN
First downs	23	17
Plays–yards	70–483	56–332
Rushes–yards	47–230	21–72
Passing yards	253	260
Passing: Comp–Att–Int	16–23–1	22–35–1
Turnovers	2	1
Time of possession	37:47	22:13

Team	Category	Player	Statistics
Georgia State	Passing	Cameran Brown	16/23, 253 yards, INT
Georgia State	Rushing	Lanear McCrary Jr.	19 carries, 101 yards, TD
Georgia State	Receiving	Kyle Washington	2 receptions, 59 yards
Kennesaw State	Passing	Rickie Collins	22/35, 260 yards, TD, INT
Kennesaw State	Rushing	Rickie Collins	10 carries, 46 yards, TD
Kennesaw State	Receiving	Javon Rogers	3 receptions, 74 yards

=== at UCF ===
Georgia State Panthers (2–0) at UCF Knights (1–1) – Game summary

Quarter	1	2	3	4	Total
Panthers	7	17	3	3	30
Knights	17	3	14	10	44

at Acrisure Bounce House • Orlando, Florida

- Date: September 19
- Game time: 7:00 p.m.
- Game weather: Cloudy • Temperature: 82 °F (28 °C) • Wind: NE at 7 miles per hour (11 km/h)
- Game attendance: 44,620
- Referee: Stephen Baron
- TV announcers (ESPN+): Mike Corey (play-by-play) and Tyoka Jackson (analyst)

Game information

First quarter

- UCF – Duke Watson 14-yard run (Will Stone kick), 12:02. Knights 7–0. Drive: 4 plays, 34 yards, 1:34.
- UCF – Will Stone 29-yard field goal, 9:15. Knights 10–0. Drive: 4 plays, -6 yards, 1:01.
- GAST – Rodshaun Dorsey 12-yard pass from Cameran Brown (Samer Layous kick), 4:11. Knights 10–7. Drive: 10 plays, 75 yards, 5:04.
- UCF – Waden Charles 30-yard pass from Keyone Jenkins (Will Stone kick), 1:05. Knights 17–7. Drive: 6 plays, 76 yards, 3:00.

Second quarter

- GAST – Rodshaun Dorsey 6-yard pass from Cameran Brown (Samer Layous kick), 8:52. Knights 17–14. Drive: 14 plays, 69 yards, 7:13.
- GAST – Qwantavius Wiggins 78-yard run (Samer Layous kick), 7:01. Panthers 21–17. Drive: 2 plays, 82 yards, 0:52.
- UCF – Will Stone 40-yard field goal, 2:47. Panthers 21–20. Drive: 10 plays, 51 yards, 4:08.
- GAST – Samer Layous 22-yard field goal, 0:00. Panthers 24–20. Drive: 10 plays, 74 yards, 2:42.

Third quarter

- UCF – Duke Watson 63-yard run (Will Stone kick), 14:42. Knights 27–24. Drive: 1 play, 63 yards, 0:10.
- GAST – Samer Layous 35-yard field goal, 11:24. Tied 27–27. Drive: 7 plays, 58 yards, 3:18.
- UCF – Keyone Jenkins 4-yard run (Will Stone kick), 0:33. Knights 34–27. Drive: 9 plays, 44 yards, 4:50.

Fourth quarter

- UCF – Will Stone 24-yard field goal, 8:42. Knights 37–27. Drive: 9 plays, 52 yards, 5:03.
- GAST – Samer Layous 49-yard field goal, 1:52. Knights 37–30. Drive: 12 plays, 49 yards, 2:52.
- UCF – Keyone Jenkins 3-yard run (Will Stone kick), 1:24. Knights 44–30. Drive: 4 plays, 40 yards, 0:28.

Statistics	GAST	UCF
First downs	25	17
Plays–yards	84-485	57-390
Rushes–yards	35-203	40-304
Passing yards	282	86
Passing: comp–att–int	30-49-3	7-17-1
Turnovers	3	1
Time of possession	33:20	26:40

Team	Category	Player	Statistics
Georgia State	Passing	Cameran Brown	30/47, 282 yards, 2 TDs, 2 INTs
Georgia State	Rushing	Qwantavius Wiggins	11 carries, 125 yards, TD
Georgia State	Receiving	DJ Riles	7 receptions, 69 yards
UCF	Passing	Keyone Jenkins	7/17, 86 yards, TD, INT
UCF	Rushing	Duke Watson	14 carries, 177 yards, 2 TDs
UCF	Receiving	Waden Charles	3 receptions, 46 yards, TD

=== Northern Illinois ===
Northern Illinois Huskies (0–3) at Georgia State Panthers (2–1) – Game summary

Quarter	1	2	3	4	Total
Huskies	7	7	0	0	14
Panthers	7	14	14	0	35

at Center Parc Stadium • Atlanta, Georgia

- Date: September 26
- Game time: 2:00 p.m.
- Game weather: Sunny
- Game attendance: 16,608
- Referee: Marty Adams
- TV announcers (ESPN+): Matt Steward (play-by-play), Sam Crenshaw (analyst)

Game information

First quarter

- GAST - Avion McBride 5-yard pass from Cameran Brown (Samer Layous kick), 14:00. Panthers 7-0. Drive: 2 plays, 4 yards, 0:48.
- NIU - Telly Johnson Jr. 14-yard run (JJ Schlenhardt kick), 1:58. Tied 7-7. Drive: 11 plays, 84 yards, 5:15.

Second quarter

- GAST - Rodshaun Dorsey 18-yard pass from Cameran Brown (Samer Layous kick), 13:55. Panthers 14-7. Drive: 8 plays, 75 yards, 3:03.
- NIU - DeAree Rogers 22-yard pass from Taron Dickens (JJ Schlenhardt kick), 12:21. Tied 14-14. Drive: 4 plays, 75 yards, 1:34.
- GAST - Isaiah Stone 100-yard kickoff return (Samer Layous kick), 12:08. Panthers 21-14.

Third quarter

- GAST - Lanear McCrary Jr. 1-yard run (Samer Layous kick), 6:25. Panthers 28-14. Drive: 9 plays, 69 yards, 4:51.
- GAST - Rodshaun Dorsey 50-yard pass from DJ Riles (Samer Layous kick), 1:25. Panthers 35-14. Drive: 5 plays, 80 yards, 2:15.

Statistics	NIU	GAST
First downs	24	17
Plays–yards	73-432	57-342
Rushes–yards	31-112	35-144
Passing yards	320	198
Passing: Comp–Att–Int	28-42-0	15-22-1
Turnovers	2	2
Time of possession	33:11	26:49

Team	Category	Player	Statistics
Northern Illinois	Passing	Taron Dickens	28/42, 320 yards, TD
Northern Illinois	Rushing	Telly Johnson Jr.	15 carries, 91 yards, TD
Northern Illinois	Receiving	DeAree Rogers	9 receptions, 107 yards, TD
Georgia State	Passing	Cameran Brown	14/21, 148 yards, 2 TDs, INT
Georgia State	Rushing	Lanear McCrary Jr.	21 carries, 112 yards, TD
Georgia State	Receiving	Rodshaun Dorsey	5 receptions, 114 yards, 2 TDs

=== Old Dominion ===
Old Dominion Monarchs (1–3) at Georgia State Panthers (3–1) – Game summary

Quarter	1	2	3	4	Total
Monarchs	0	0	0	0	0
Panthers	0	0	0	0	0

at Center Parc Stadium • Atlanta, Georgia

- Date: October 3
- Game time: 3:30 p.m.

Game information

First quarter
Second quarter
Third quarter
Fourth quarter

Statistics	ODU	GAST
First downs		
Plays–yards		
Rushes–yards		
Passing yards		
Passing: comp–att–int		
Turnovers		
Time of possession		

Team	Category	Player	Statistics
Old Dominion	Passing		
Old Dominion	Rushing		
Old Dominion	Receiving		
Georgia State	Passing		
Georgia State	Rushing		
Georgia State	Receiving		

=== at James Madison ===
Georgia State Panthers (4–1) at James Madison Dukes (6–0) – Game summary

Quarter	1	2	3	4	Total
Panthers	0	0	0	0	0
Dukes	0	0	0	0	0

at Bridgeforth Stadium • Harrisonburg, Virginia

- Date: October 17

Game information

First quarter

Second quarter

Third quarter

Fourth quarter

Statistics	GAST	JMU
First downs		
Total yards		
Rushing yards		
Passing yards		
Passing: Comp–Att–Int		
Time of possession		

Team	Category	Player	Statistics
Georgia State	Passing		
Georgia State	Rushing		
Georgia State	Receiving		
James Madison	Passing		
James Madison	Rushing		
James Madison	Receiving		

=== at Arkansas State ===
Georgia State Panthers (4–2) at Arkansas State Red Wolves (3–4) – Game summary

Quarter	1	2	3	4	Total
Panthers	0	0	0	0	0
Red Wolves	0	0	0	0	0

at Centennial Bank Stadium • Jonesboro, Arkansas

- Date: October 24
- Game time: 6:00 p.m. CDT

Game information

First quarter
Second quarter
Third quarter
Fourth quarter

Statistics	GAST	ARST
First downs		
Plays–yards		
Rushes–yards		
Passing yards		
Passing: comp–att–int		
Turnovers		
Time of possession		

Team	Category	Player	Statistics
Georgia State	Passing		
Georgia State	Rushing		
Georgia State	Receiving		
Arkansas State	Passing		
Arkansas State	Rushing		
Arkansas State	Receiving		

=== Coastal Carolina ===
Coastal Carolina Chanticleers (2–5) at Georgia State Panthers (4–3) – Game summary

Quarter	1	2	Total
Chanticleers			0
Panthers			0

at Center Parc Stadium • Atlanta, Georgia

- Date: October 31

Game information

First quarter

Second quarter

Third quarter

Fourth quarter

Statistics	CCU	GAST
First downs		
Total yards		
Rushing yards		
Passing yards		
Passing: Comp–Att–Int		
Turnovers		
Time of possession		

Team	Category	Player	Statistics
Coastal Carolina	Passing		
Coastal Carolina	Rushing		
Coastal Carolina	Receiving		
Georgia State	Passing		
Georgia State	Rushing		
Georgia State	Receiving		

=== at Appalachian State ===
Georgia State Panthers (4–4) at Appalachian State Mountaineers (5–3) – Game summary

Quarter	1	2	3	4	Total
Panthers	0	0	0	0	0
Mountaineers	0	0	0	0	0

at Kidd Brewer Stadium • Boone, North Carolina

- Date: November 7

Statistics	GAST	APP
First downs		
Plays–yards		
Rushes–yards		
Passing yards		
Passing: comp–att–int		
Time of possession		

Team	Category	Player	Statistics
Georgia State	Passing		
Georgia State	Rushing		
Georgia State	Receiving		
Appalachian State	Passing		
Appalachian State	Rushing		
Appalachian State	Receiving		

=== Georgia Southern (Modern Day Hate) ===
Georgia Southern Eagles (5–4) at Georgia State Panthers (5–4) – Game summary

Quarter	1	2	3	4	Total
Eagles	0	0	0	0	0
Panthers	0	0	0	0	0

at Center Parc Stadium • Atlanta, Georgia

- Date: November 14

Game information

First quarter
Second quarter
Third quarter
Fourth quarter

Statistics	GASO	GAST
First downs		
Plays–yards		
Rushes–yards		
Passing yards		
Passing: comp–att–int		
Turnovers		
Time of possession		

Team	Category	Player	Statistics
Georgia Southern	Passing		
Georgia Southern	Rushing		
Georgia Southern	Receiving		
Georgia State	Passing		
Georgia State	Rushing		
Georgia State	Receiving		

=== at Marshall ===
Georgia State Panthers (5–5) at Marshall Thundering Herd (5–5) – Game summary

Quarter	1	2	3	4	Total
Panthers	0	0	0	0	0
Thundering Herd	0	0	0	0	0

at Joan C. Edwards Stadium • Huntington, West Virginia

- Date: November 21

Game information

First quarter
Second quarter
Third quarter
Fourth quarter

Statistics	GAST	MRSH
First downs		
Plays–yards		
Rushes–yards		
Passing yards		
Passing: comp–att–int		
Turnovers		
Time of possession		

Team	Category	Player	Statistics
Georgia State	Passing		
Georgia State	Rushing		
Georgia State	Receiving		
Marshall	Passing		
Marshall	Rushing		
Marshall	Receiving		

=== Louisiana ===
Louisiana Ragin' Cajuns (0–0) at Georgia State Panthers (0–0) – Game summary

Quarter	1	2	3	4	Total
Ragin' Cajuns	0	0	0	0	0
Panthers	0	0	0	0	0

at Center Parc Stadium • Atlanta, Georgia

- Date: November 28

Game information

First quarter
Second quarter
Third quarter
Fourth quarter

Statistics	LA	GAST
First downs		
Plays–yards		
Rushes–yards		
Passing yards		
Passing: comp–att–int		
Turnovers		
Time of possession		

Team	Category	Player	Statistics
Louisiana	Passing		
Louisiana	Rushing		
Louisiana	Receiving		
Georgia State	Passing		
Georgia State	Rushing		
Georgia State	Receiving		
