= Dell McGee =

American football player and coach (born 1973)

Current position
- Title: Head coach
- Team: Georgia State
- Conference: Sun Belt
- Record: 9–26

Biographical details
- Born: September 7, 1973 (age 53); Columbus, Georgia, U.S.
- Education: Auburn University

Playing career
- 1992–1995: Auburn
- 1996–1998: Arizona Cardinals
- 1999: Rhein Fire
- 1999: Detroit Lions
- 2000: Carolina Cobras
- 2001: Los Angeles Xtreme
- 2001: Nashville Kats
- Position: Cornerback

Coaching career (HC unless noted)
- 2002: Harris County HS (GA) (DB)
- 2003–2004: Greenville HS (GA) (DC)
- 2005–2012: Carver-Columbus HS (GA)
- 2013: Auburn (analyst)
- 2014: Georgia Southern (RB)
- 2015: Georgia Southern (AHC/RB)
- 2015: Georgia Southern (interim HC)
- 2016–2018: Georgia (AHC/RB)
- 2019–2023: Georgia (RGC/RB)
- 2024–present: Georgia State

Head coaching record
- Overall: 11–26 (college); 85–21 (high school)
- Bowls: 1–0

Antonio Deleon "Dell" McGee (born September 7, 1973) is an American college football coach and former player. He is the head football coach for Georgia State University, a position he has held since 2024. He was the interim head football coach for the Georgia Southern Eagles in 2015. He played as a cornerback in the National Football League (NFL), and was selected in the fifth round of the 1996 NFL draft by the Arizona Cardinals. He was also a member of the Detroit Lions.

He was part of the Bulldogs' coaching staff that won the National Championship over Alabama in the 2021 season. The following year, he won another title when Georgia defeated TCU in the 2023 College Football Playoff National Championship.

On February 23, 2024, Georgia State hired McGee as head coach.

Has one son, Austin, a member of the Panthers football team who signed with Georgia State in December 2023.

== Head coaching record ==
=== College ===
Year	Team	Overall	Conference	Standing	Bowl/playoffs
Georgia Southern Eagles (Sun Belt Conference) (2015)
2015	Georgia Southern	1–0†			W GoDaddy
Georgia Southern:		1–0		† Served as interim HC for bowl game	
Georgia State Panthers (Sun Belt Conference) (2024–present)
2024	Georgia State	3–9	1–7	7th (East)	
2025	Georgia State	1–11	0–8	7th (East)	
2026	Georgia State	5–6	2–5		
Georgia State:		9–26	3–20		
Total:		10–26			

=== High school ===
Year	Team	Overall	Conference	Standing	Bowl/playoffs
Carver-Columbus Tigers () (2005–2012)
2005	Carver-Columbus	2–8	1–7	11th	
2006	Carver-Columbus	12–2	4–1	2nd	
2007	Carver-Columbus	15–0	7–0	1st	
2008	Carver-Columbus	11–4	6–0	1st	
2009	Carver-Columbus	11–2	6–0	1st	
2010	Carver-Columbus	13–1	7–0	1st	
2011	Carver-Columbus	11–2	6–0	1st	
2012	Carver-Columbus	10–2	6–0	1st	
Carver-Columbus:		85–21	43–8		
Total:		85–21			
National championship Conference title Conference division title or championship game berth
