= 2026 UCF Knights football team =

American college football season

2026 UCF Knights football
- Conference: Big 12 Conference
- Record: 6–5 (4–4 Big 12)
- Head coach: Scott Frost (4th season)
- Offensive coordinator: Steve Cooper (2nd season)
- Offensive scheme: No-huddle spread option
- Defensive coordinator: Alex Grinch (2nd season)
- Base defense: 3–4
- Home stadium: Acrisure Bounce House

Uniform
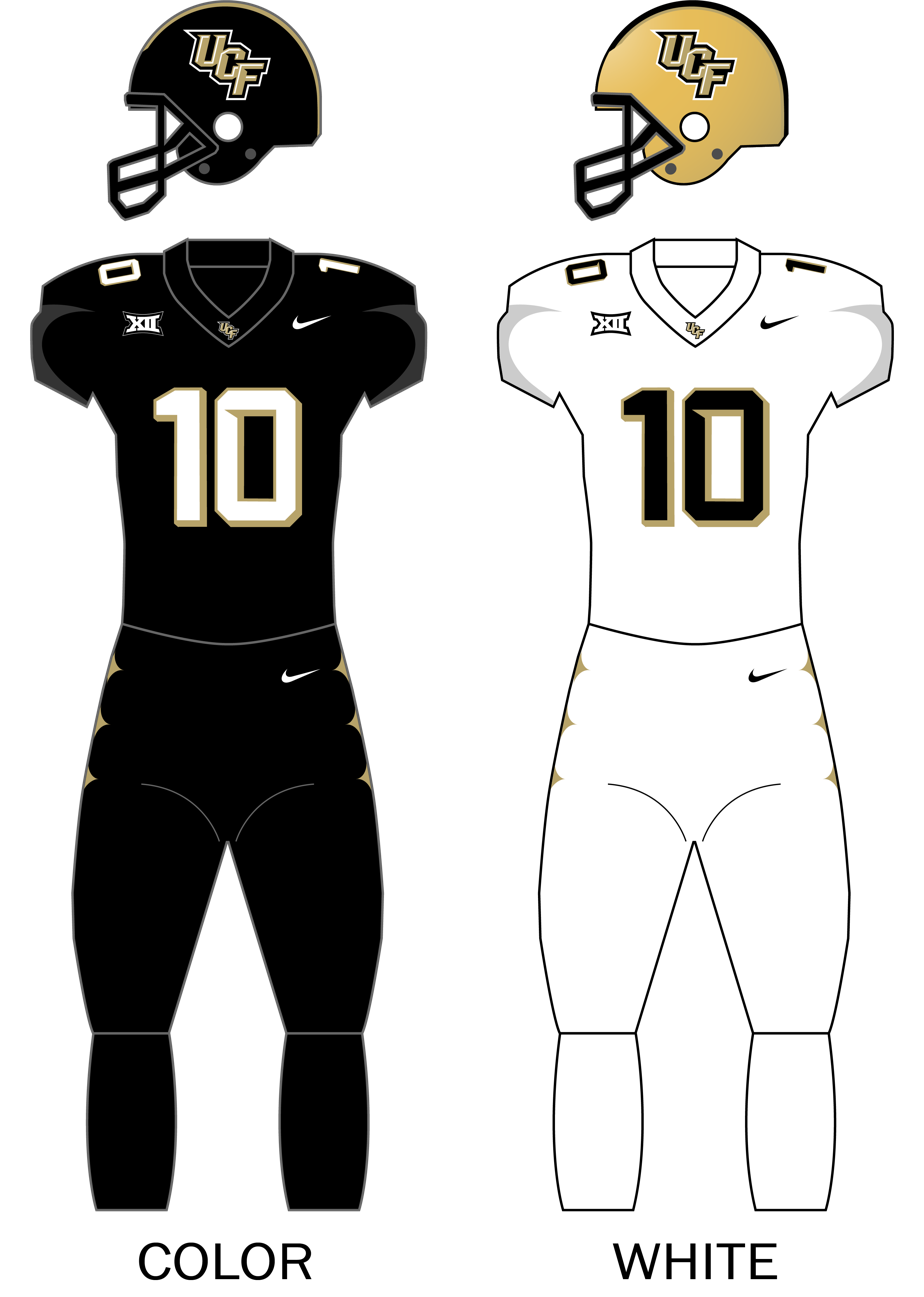

2026 Big 12 Conference football standings
	Conf.			Overall
Team	W		L	W		L
No. 2 Utah	7	–	0	10	–	0
No. 12 Texas Tech	6	–	1	9	–	1
No. 10 BYU	5	–	2	8	–	2
No. 19 Arizona	4	–	3	7	–	3
No. 20 Houston	4	–	3	7	–	3
Oklahoma State	4	–	3	6	–	4
Arizona State	4	–	3	6	–	4
Baylor	4	–	3	6	–	4
UCF	4	–	4	6	–	5
TCU	3	–	4	5	–	5
Iowa State	3	–	5	5	–	6
Cincinnati	2	–	5	5	–	5
West Virginia	2	–	5	5	–	5
Colorado	2	–	5	4	–	6
Kansas	2	–	5	4	–	6
Kansas State	1	–	6	4	–	6
Championship: December 4, 2026
^ – College Football Playoff participant; $ – Conference champion; y – Championship game participant; As of November 21, 2026; Rankings from CFP rankings

The 2026 UCF Knights football team represents the University of Central Florida (UCF) as a member of the Big 12 Conference during the 2026 NCAA Division I FBS football season. The Knights are led by fourth-year head coach Scott Frost in the second year of his second stint. The Knights play their home games at Acrisure Bounce House, located in Orlando, Florida. (Note: The stadium and the UCF main campus have an Orlando mailing address, but both are located in unincorporated Orange County.)

This was the first season since 2015 (when they joined the American Athletic Conference) that they did not play against rival Cincinnati.

== Schedule ==
Date	Time	Opponent	Site	TV	Result	Attendance
September 3	7:00 p.m.	Bethune–Cookman*	Acrisure Bounce House; Orlando, FL	ESPN+	W 73–6	43,127
September 12	3:30 p.m.	at Pittsburgh*	Acrisure Stadium; Pittsburgh, PA	ESPN2	L 7–12	45,926
September 19	7:00 p.m.	Georgia State*	Acrisure Bounce House; Orlando, FL	ESPN+	W 44–30	44,620
September 26	3:30 p.m.	TCU	Acrisure Bounce House; Orlando, FL	FS1	W 21–13	43,212
October 3	12:00 p.m.	at No. 20 Houston	TDECU Stadium; Houston, TX	ESPN2	L 17–27	25,593
October 10	12:00 p.m.	at No. 18 Oklahoma State	Boone Pickens Stadium; Stillwater, OK	ESPN2	L 28–42	52,168
October 24	3:30 p.m.	No. 2 BYU^{†}	Acrisure Bounce House; Orlando, FL	FOX	W 39–31 ^{2OT}	45,112
October 30	7:30 p.m.	Baylor	Acrisure Bounce House; Orlando, FL (Space Game)	ESPN	L 9–41	45,906
November 7	3:45 p.m.	at Kansas	David Booth Kansas Memorial Stadium; Lawrence, KS	ESPN2	W 33–32	31,008
November 14	5:30 p.m.	Arizona State	Acrisure Bounce House; Orlando, FL	ESPNU	L 13–26	44,114
November 20	6:00 p.m.	Iowa State	Acrisure Bounce House; Orlando, FL	FS1	W 48–17	34,043
November 28	2:00 p.m.	at Colorado	Folsom Field; Boulder, CO	TNT/TruTV		
*Non-conference game; ^{†}Homecoming; Rankings from AP Poll (and CFP Rankings, after November 3) – Released prior to game; All times are in Eastern time

== Offseason ==
=== Incoming ===
Name	Position	Old school
Kaleb Annett	QB	Boise State
Alonza Barnett III	QB	JMU
Ty Bartrum	S	Harvard
Atticus Bertrams	P	Wisconsin
Jonathan Bibbs	WR	Louisiana–Monroe
TJ Branch	S	Colorado
Grayson Brousseau	TE	Oklahoma State
Dylan Burk	TE	Sam Houston
Landen Chambers	RB	Central Arkansas
Thomas Collins	DL	Oregon State
Jahleel Culbreath	LB	Old Dominion
Tackett Curtis	LB	Wisconsin
Bruno Dall	EDGE	Akron
Josh Derry	WR	Monmouth
Jailen Duffie	CB	North Dakota State
Caleb Flagg	S	Missouri
Tyler Gibson	OT	Charlotte
Brad Gurley Jr.	DL	Eastern Kentucky
L A Jessie Harrold	EDGE	Florida State
Rashad Henry	LB	UMass
Kyle Hicks	LS	Tennessee State
Matt Irwin	S	Idaho
Keyone Jenkins	QB	FIU
Kahmel Johnson	S	Wayne State
Artavius Jones	DL	Miami (FL)
Daniel Marcellinus	OL	Campbell
Dean Miller	EDGE	Kansas
Josh Schnell	DL	Tennessee
Will Stone	K	Texas
Henry Tabansi	OT	Buffalo
Ken Talley	EDGE	Arkansas
Cooper Terpstra	IOL	Michigan State
Duke Watson	RB	Louisville
Brady Wayburn	OT	UConn

=== Outgoing ===
Name	Position	Destination
Max Drag	TE	South Carolina
Davi Belfort	QB	James Madison
Patrick Barnett	IOL	Fresno State
Jaquez Joiner	IOL	Marshall
Isaiah Reed	CB	UMass
Josh Dorsainvil	EDGE	NA
Keshaun Hudson	DL	Jackson State
Troy Ford	LB	West Florida
Cam Fancher	QB	Michigan State
Carl Jenkins Jr.	WR	Miami (OH)
Dalton Riggs	LS	Ohio State
Jaeden Gould	S	Temple
DJ Black	WR	South Carolina
Ja'Cari Henderson	CB	Appalachian State
Stacy Gage	RB	LSU
Tyreek'e Robinson	DL	East Tennessee State
Rodney Lora	DL	Purdue
TJ Bullard	LB	Florida
Bredell Richardson	WR	Tulane
Christian Peterson	S	East Carolina
Jamaal Johnson	EDGE	Northwestern
Andrew Rumph	DL	Jacksonville State
Derrick LeBlanc	DL	Maryland
Carter Miller	IOL	South Carolina
Malakhi Boone	LB	Bethune–Cookman
John Walker	DL	Ohio State
Jacurri Brown	QB	Rice
Jyaire Brown	CB	Southern Miss
Kylan Fox	TE	Purdue
Tayven Jackson	QB	North Texas
Tony Williams Jr.	S	Kennesaw State
Jakob Gude	S	Appalachian State
Jaylen Heyward	S	Arkansas State
Kam Moore	LB	Arkansas State
Chase Jarrett	DB	Colgate
Thomas Gearity	OL	Colgate
Dwartney Wortham	WR	Furman

==== 2026 Recruits ====
College recruiting
Name	Hometown	School	Height	Weight	Commit date
Overall recruit ranking:
Note: In many cases, Scout, Rivals, 247Sports, On3, and ESPN may conflict in their listings of height and weight.; In these cases, the average was taken. ESPN grades are on a 100-point scale.; Sources: "UCF Football Commitment List". Rivals.; "2026 Player Commitments - UCF". ESPN.; "2026 Team Ranking". Rivals.com.; "UCF Football 2026 Commits". 247Sports.

*= 247Sports Composite rating; ratings are out of 1.00. (five stars= 1.00–.98, four stars= .97–.90, three stars= .80–.89)
†= Despite being rated as a three star recruit by ESPN, On3.com, and 247Sports.com, Stroud received a four star rating by Rivals.com.
Δ= TBD left the UCF program following signing but prior to the 2026 season.

=== Preseason ===
For 2026, UCF did not conduct their annual spring exhibition game, due to construction at the stadium. As a substitute, the Knights arranged for a public practice session on May 2. The Big 12 officially discontinued their annual preseason media poll, but an unofficial poll sponsored by Tulsa World predicted the Knights to finish 14th in the conference.

In July, head coach Scott Frost named James Madison transfer Alonza Barnett III the starting quarterback, beating out fellow transfers Keyone Jenkins (FIU) and Kaleb Annett (Boise State). Barnett led James Madison to a 12–2 record in 2025, winning the Sun Belt Championship, and a berth in the College Football Playoff.

=== Award watch lists ===
Player	Position	Award(s)
Alonza Barnett III	QB	Maxwell Award; Manning Award; Davey O'Brien Award; East–West Shrine Bowl
Lewis Carter	LB	Chuck Bednarik Award; East–West Shrine Bowl
Horace Lockett	DT	Senior Bowl Top 300; East–West Shrine Bowl
Dylan Wade	TE	John Mackey Award; East–West Shrine Bowl
Jahleel Culbreath	LB	Butkus Award
Landen Chambers	RB	Earl Campbell Tyler Rose Award
Duke Watson	RB	Doak Walker Award
Owen Spell	OL	Wuerffel Trophy

Additional players named to the East–West Shrine Bowl watch list include: Ty Bartrum, Jayden Bellamy, Thomas Collins, Preston Cushman, Josh Derry, Demari Henderson, and R.J. Jackson Jr.

== Game summaries ==
=== vs Bethune–Cookman (FCS) ===
Bethune-Cookman Wildcats (FCS) (0–0) at UCF Knights (0–0) – Game summary

Quarter	1	2	3	4	Total
Wildcats (FCS)	0	0	0	6	6
Knights	21	17	28	7	73

at Acrisure Bounce House • Orlando, Florida

- Date: Thursday September 3, 2026
- Game time: 7:00 p.m. EDT
- Game weather: Cloudy • Temperature: 83 °F (28 °C) • Wind: NW at 6 miles per hour (9.7 km/h)
- Game attendance: 43,127
- Referee: Tutashinda Salaam
- TV announcers (ESPN+): Eric Rothman and Doc Holliday
- Preview • Recap • Gamecast

Game information

First quarter

- UCF – Duke Watson 64-yard run (Will Stone kick), 11:02, Knights 7–0. Drive: 2 plays, 74 yards, 0:30.
- UCF – Jayden Williams 47-yard interception return (Will Stone kick), 10:42, Knights 14–0.
- UCF – Alonza Barnett III 5-yard run (Will Stone kick), 3:11, Knights 21–0. Drive: 11 plays, 85 yards, 4:23.

Second quarter

- UCF – Jonathan Bibbs 23-yard pass from Alonza Barnett III (Will Stone kick), 14:54, Knights 28–0. Drive: 4 plays, 46 yards, 1:01.
- UCF – Will Stone 34-yard field goal, 7:19, Knights 31–0. Drive: 7 plays, 32 yards, 3:26.
- UCF – Landen Chambers 2-yard run (Will Stone kick), 1:50, Knights 38–0. Drive: 6 plays, 37 yards, 2:17.

Third quarter

- UCF – Taevion Swint 27-yard run (Will Stone kick), 13:02, Knights 45–0. Drive: 5 plays, 37 yards, 1:49.
- UCF – Landen Chambers 27-yard run (Will Stone kick), 9:10, Knights 52–0. Drive: 4 plays, 59 yards, 2:17.
- UCF – Caleb Rollerson 9-yard pass from Keyone Jenkins (Will Stone kick), 5:42, Knights 59–0. Drive: 2 plays, 24 yards, 0:53.
- UCF – Agyeman Addae 39-yard run (Will Stone kick), 2:02, Knights 66–0. Drive: 3 plays, 53 yards, 1:29.

Fourth quarter

- UCF – Rocco Marriott 1-yard run (Will Stone kick), 14:56, Knights 73–0. Drive: 3 plays, 39 yards, 0:54.
- BCU – Kobe Stewart 8-yard pass from Joel Morris (no PAT), 0:00, Knights 73–6. Drive: 11 plays, 80 yards, 5:12.

Statistics	BCU	UCF
First downs	9	26
Plays–yards	60–181	60–560
Rushes–yards	40–107	38–360
Passing yards	74	200
Passing: comp–att–int	10–20–1	15–22–1
Turnovers	2	1
Time of possession	31:55	28:05

Team	Category	Player	Statistics
Bethune–Cookman	Passing	Tyler Jefferson	4/10, 55 yards, INT
Bethune–Cookman	Rushing	Isaiah Daniel	10 carries, 65 yards
Bethune–Cookman	Receiving	Rickie Shaw II	4 receptions, 40 yards
UCF	Passing	Alonza Barnett III	11/18, 158 yards, TD, INT
UCF	Rushing	Duke Watson	7 carries, 110 yards, TD
UCF	Receiving	Josh Derry	3 receptions, 45 yards

UCF opened the season against Bethune–Cookman on Thursday night. The Knights routed the Wildcats 73–6, tying a school record for most points in a game. It was the largest margin of victory in program history (67 points), and UCF won on opening day for the 11th consecutive year.

Alonza Barnett III started at quarterback, and threw for 158 yards and ran for a touchdown. The Knights got off to a fast start. On the second play from scrimmage, Duke Watson ran for a 64-yard touchdown, and an early 7–0 lead. Just 20 seconds later, Jayden Williams returned an interception 47 yards for a touchdown, and the Knights were up 14–0 less than five minutes into the game. The Knights built a 38–0 halftime lead, and cruised to victory.

=== at Pittsburgh ===
UCF Knights (1–0) at Pittsburgh Panthers (1–0) – Game summary

Quarter	1	2	3	4	Total
Knights	0	0	0	7	7
Panthers	3	9	0	0	12

at Acrisure Stadium • Pittsburgh, Pennsylvania

- Date: Saturday September 12, 2026
- Game time: 3:30 p.m. EDT (delayed until 4:35 p.m. due to weather delay)
- Game weather: Rain • Temperature: 75 °F (24 °C) • Wind: S at 6 mph
- Game attendance: 45,926
- Referee: Henry Johns
- TV announcers (ESPN2): Lowell Galindo, Kirk Morrison and Dawn Davenport
- Preview • Recap • Gamecast

Game information

First quarter

- PIT – Antonio Chadha 28-yard field goal, 0:04, Panthers 3–0. Drive: 18 plays, 83 yards, 7:03.

Second quarter

- PIT – Safety (Alonza Barnett III intentional grounding in endzone), 7:24, Panthers 5–0.
- PIT – Damon Ferguson Jr. 13-yard run (Antonio Chadha kick), 11:02, Panthers 12–0. Drive: 7 plays, 44 yards, 2:32.

Third quarter

- No scoring plays.

Fourth quarter

- UCF – Waden Charles 19-yard pass from Alonza Barnett III (Will Stone kick), 2:51, Panthers 12–7. Drive: 9 plays, 64 yards, 3:54.

Statistics	UCF	PITT
First downs	9	15
Plays–yards	53–206	72–315
Rushes–yards	22–20	43–103
Passing yards	186	212
Passing: comp–att–int	20–31–0	18–29–0
Turnovers	0	0
Time of possession	23:48	36:12

Team	Category	Player	Statistics
UCF	Passing	Alonza Barnett III	20/31, 186 yards, TD
UCF	Rushing	Alonza Barnett III	13 carries, 13 yards
UCF	Receiving	Ric'Darious Farmer	4 receptions, 52 yards
Pittsburgh	Passing	Mason Heintschel	18/29, 212 yards
Pittsburgh	Rushing	Damon Ferguson Jr.	20 carries, 59 yards, TD
Pittsburgh	Receiving	Cataurus Hicks	3 receptions, 64 yards

UCF lost 12–7 on the road at Pitt, on a rainy afternoon. It was the Knights' 10th consecutive road loss. The weather turned the game into a defensive battle. Trailing 12–0 late in the fourth quarter, UCF finally got on the board with a 19-yard touchdown pass in the pouring rain to Waden Charles. The Knights defense forced a three-and-out, and got the ball back with 2:51 remaining. The offense, however, was unable to mount a game-winning drive, and the Panthers held on to win.

=== vs Georgia State ===
Georgia State Panthers (2–0) at UCF Knights (1–1) – Game summary

Quarter	1	2	3	4	Total
Panthers	7	17	3	3	30
Knights	17	3	14	10	44

at Acrisure Bounce House • Orlando, Florida (Family Weekend)

- Date: Saturday September 19, 2026
- Game time: 7:00 p.m. EDT
- Game weather: Cloudy • Temperature: 82 °F (28 °C) • Wind: NE at 7 miles per hour (11 km/h)
- Game attendance: 44,620
- Referee: Stephen Baron
- TV announcers (ESPN+): Mike Corey and Tyoka Jackson
- Preview • Recap • Gamecast

Game information

First quarter

- UCF – Duke Watson 14-yard run (Will Stone kick), 12:02 Knights 7–0. Drive: 4 plays, 34 yards, 1:34.
- UCF – Will Stone 29-yard field goal, 9:15, Knights 10–0. Drive: 4 plays, -6 yards, 1:01.
- GAST – Rodshaun Dorsey 12-yard pass from Cameran Brown (Samer Layous Kick), 4:11, Knights 10–7. Drive: 10 plays, 75 yards, 5:04.
- UCF – Waden Charles 30-yard pass from Keyone Jenkins (Will Stone Kick), 1:05, Knights 17–7. Drive: 6 plays, 76 yards, 3:00.

Second quarter

- GAST – Rodshaun Dorsey 6-yard pass from Cameran Brown (Samer Layous Kick), 8:52, Knights 17–14. Drive: 14 plays, 69 yards, 7:13.
- GAST – Qwantavius Wiggins 78-yard run (Samer Layous Kick), 7:01 Panthers 21–17. Drive: 2 plays, 82 yards, 0:52.
- UCF – Will Stone 40-yard field goal, 2:47, Panthers 21–20. Drive: 10 plays, 51 yards, 4:08.
- GAST – Samer Layous 22-yard field goal, 0:00, Panthers 24–20. Drive: 10 plays, 74 yards, 2:42.

Third quarter

- UCF – Duke Watson 63-yard run (Will Stone kick), 14:42 Knights 27–24. Drive: 1 play, 63 yards, 0:10.
- GAST – Samer Layous 35-yard field goal, 11:24, Tied 27–27. Drive: 7 plays, 58 yards, 3:18.
- UCF – Keyone Jenkins 4-yard run (Will Stone kick), 0:33 Knights 34–27. Drive: 9 plays, 44 yards, 4:50.

Fourth quarter

- UCF – Will Stone 24-yard field goal, 8:42, Knights 37–27. Drive: 9 plays, 52 yards, 5:03.
- GAST – Samer Layous 49-yard field goal, 1:52, Knights 37–30. Drive: 12 plays, 49 yards, 2:52.
- UCF – Keyone Jenkins 9-yard run (Will Stone kick), 1:24, Knights 44–30. Drive: 4 plays, 40 yards, 0:28.

Statistics	GAST	UCF
First downs	25	17
Plays–yards	84–485	57–390
Rushes–yards	35–203	40–304
Passing yards	282	86
Passing: comp–att–int	30–49–3	7–17–1
Turnovers	3	1
Time of possession	33:20	26:40

Team	Category	Player	Statistics
Georgia State	Passing	Cameran Brown	30/47, 282 yards, 2 TD, 2 INT
Georgia State	Rushing	Qwantavius Wiggins	11 carries, 125 yards, TD
Georgia State	Receiving	DJ Riles	7 receptions, 69 yards
UCF	Passing	Keyone Jenkins	7/17, 86 yards, TD, INT
UCF	Rushing	Duke Watson	14 carries, 177 yards, 2 TD
UCF	Receiving	Waden Charles	3 receptions, 46 yards, TD

Alonza Barnett III sat out due to a hamstring injury suffered at Pitt, and Keyone Jenkins started at quarterback. Jenkins threw one touchdown pass, and ran for two touchdowns as the Knights rallied past Georgia State on Saturday night. The Panthers took a 24–20 lead into halftime. But in the second half, the UCF defense kept the Panthers out of the endzone, forced three interceptions, and the Knights pulled away for a 44–30 victory. Running back Duke Watson sparked the comeback with a 63-yard touchdown run on the first play of the third quarter. UCF put up 304 yards on the ground with four rushing touchdowns.

=== vs TCU ===
TCU Horned Frogs (2–1) at UCF Knights (2–1) – Game summary

Quarter	1	2	3	4	Total
Horned Frogs	7	3	3	0	13
Knights	7	7	0	7	21

at Acrisure Bounce House • Orlando, Florida

- Date: Saturday September 26, 2026
- Game time: 3:30 p.m.
- Game weather: Sunny • Temperature: 82 °F (28 °C) • Wind: N at 6 miles per hour (9.7 km/h)
- Game attendance: 43,212
- Referee: Michael VanderVeld
- TV announcers (FS1): Dan Hellie and Robert Smith
- Preview • Recap • Gamecast

Game information

First quarter

- UCF – Taevion Swint 13-yard run (Will Stone kick), 10:27 Knights 7–0. Drive: 6 plays, 43 yards, 3:39.
- TCU – Jeremy Payne 1-yard run (Nate McCashland kick), 6:48 Tied 7–7. Drive: 7 plays, 75 yards, 3:39.

Second quarter

- TCU – Nate McCashland 29-yard field goal, 8:30, Horned Frogs 10–7. Drive: 9 plays, 41 yards, 3:13.
- UCF – Caden Piening 19-yard pass from Keyone Jenkins (Will Stone Kick), 4:58, Knights 14–10. Drive: 7 plays, 75 yards, 3:32.

Third quarter

- TCU – Nate McCashland 45-yard field goal, 3:25, Knights 14–13. Drive: 15 plays, 50 yards, 9:45.

Fourth quarter

- UCF – Landen Chambers 1-yard run (Will Stone kick), 12:25 Knights 21–13. Drive: 11 plays, 75 yards, 6:00.

Statistics	TCU	UCF
First downs	18	17
Plays–yards	67–343	53–266
Rushes–yards	27–33	33–106
Passing yards	310	160
Passing: comp–att–int	25–40–2	19–20–0
Time of possession	32:49	27:11

Team	Category	Player	Statistics
TCU	Passing	Jaden Craig	25/40, 310 yards, 2 INT
TCU	Rushing	Jeremy Payne	15 carries, 48 yards, 1 TD
TCU	Receiving	Jordan Dwyer	5 receptions, 100 yards
UCF	Passing	Keyone Jenkins	19/20, 160 yards, 1 TD
UCF	Rushing	Duke Watson	13 carries, 57 yards
UCF	Receiving	Josh Derry	3 receptions, 41 yards

UCF hosted TCU in their Big 12 Conference opener. Keyone Jenkins started at quarterback for the second straight week. Jenkins set a school record going 19-for-20 in pass attempts (95.0% completion percentage), leading the Knights to a 21–13 victory over the Horned Frogs. The Horned Frogs got the ball first, but the Knights defense forced a fumble on the third play of the game. Six plays later, Taevion Swint's 13-yard touchdown run gave the Knights an early 7–0 lead. Leading 14–10 with 4:11 to go in the first half, Jayden Bellamy intercepted Jaden Craig and the Knights took over at the TCU 36. Facing a 3rd & 7 at the 10 yard line, Keyone Jenkins was sacked and fumbled, snuffing out the scoring opportunity. UCF still led 14–10 at halftime.

UCF got the ball to start the second half, but went three-and-out. TCU followed up with a field goal, and cut the deficit to 14–13 midway through the third quarter. The Horned Frogs had driven to the UCF 15, but two penalties and a sack by Isaiah Nixon forced TCU to settle for the field goal. Jenkins then drove the Knights 75 yards in 11 plays. The drive was capped off with a touchdown run by Landen Chambers, and a 21–13 lead with 12:25 left in regulation. With 1:48 to go, TCU was driving in UCF territory, facing a 3rd & 17 at the UCF 28. Antione Jackson intercepted Jaden Craig at the 7 yard line which essentially sealed the victory for the Knights. UCF improved to 3–1 overall (1–0 in Big 12), and 3–0 at home.

=== at No. 20 Houston ===
UCF Knights (3–1) at No. 20 Houston Cougars (3–1) – Game summary

Quarter	1	2	3	4	Total
Knights	7	3	7	0	17
No. 20 Cougars	0	0	14	13	27

at TDECU Stadium • Houston, Texas

- Date: Saturday October 3, 2026
- Game time: 11:00 a.m. CDT / 12:00 p.m. EDT
- Game weather: Cloudy • Temperature: 82 °F (28 °C) • Wind: NE at 9 miles per hour (14 km/h)
- Game attendance: 25,593
- Referee: Kevin Mar
- TV announcers (ESPN2): Anish Shroff, Andre Ware, and Morgan Uber
- Preview • Recap • Gamecast

Game information

First quarter

- UCF – Josh Derry 13-yard pass from Keyone Jenkins (Will Stone Kick), 11:17, Knights 7–0. Drive: 6 plays, 75 yards, 3:43.

Second quarter

- UCF – Will Stone 30-yard field goal, 1:36, Knights 10–0. Drive: 8 plays, 68 yards, 1:52.

Third quarter

- UCF – Keyone Jenkins 5-yard run (Will Stone kick), 6:01 Knights 17–0. Drive: 9 plays, 71 yards, 5:48.
- HOU – Conner Weigman 19-yard run (Jonathan Dimas kick), 3:38 Knights 17–7. Drive: 7 plays, 75 yards, 2:23.
- HOU – Conner Weigman 1-yard run (Jonathan Dimas kick), 1:11 Knights 17–14. Drive: 2 plays, 2 yards, 0:41.

Fourth quarter

- HOU – Conner Weigman 1-yard run (Jonathan Dimas kick), 10:15 Cougars 21–17. Drive: 11 plays, 62 yards, 4:36.
- HOU – Jonathan Dimas 40-yard field goal, 4:14, Cougars 24–17. Drive: 9 plays, 56 yards, 3:59.
- HOU – Jonathan Dimas 46-yard field goal, 1:56, Cougars 27–17. Drive: 5 plays, 3 yards, 0:34.

Statistics	UCF	HOU
First downs	13	23
Plays–yards	59–332	77–393
Rushes–yards	21–73	44–154
Passing yards	259	239
Passing: comp–att–int	25–38–1	18–33–0
Time of possession	26:38	33:32

Team	Category	Player	Statistics
UCF	Passing	Keyone Jenkins	23/35, 253 yards, TD, INT
UCF	Rushing	Duke Watson	9 carries, 50 yards
UCF	Receiving	Josh Derry	7 receptions, 101 yards, TD
Houston	Passing	Conner Weigman	18/33, 239 yards
Houston	Rushing	Re'Shaun Sanford II	18 carries, 62 yards
Houston	Receiving	Patrick Overmyer	6 receptions, 76 yards

UCF led 17–0 in the third quarter, but Houston rallied with 27 unanswered points. The Knights fell 27–17, notching their 11th consecutive road loss. They dropped to 3–2 on the season (1–1 in Big 12).

=== at No. 18 Oklahoma State ===
UCF Knights (3–2) at No. 18 Oklahoma State Cowboys (3–1) – Game summary

Quarter	1	2	3	4	Total
Knights	14	7	0	7	28
No. 18 Cowboys	7	14	3	18	42

at Boone Pickens Stadium • Stillwater, Oklahoma

- Date: Saturday October 10, 2026
- Game time: 11:00 a.m. CDT / 12:00 p.m. EDT
- Game weather: Sunny • Temperature: 80 °F (27 °C) • Wind: SW at 9 mph
- Game attendance: 52,168
- Referee: Kevin Boitmann
- TV announcers (ESPN2): Lowell Galindo, Kirk Morrison, and Dawn Davenport
- Preview • Recap • Gamecast

Game information

First quarter

- UCF – Grayson Brousseau 1-yard pass from Keyone Jenkins (Will Stone Kick), 10:08, Knights 7–0. Drive: 9 plays, 42 yards, 4:28.
- OKST – Drew Mestemaker 11-yard run (Sam Keltner kick), 6:19 Tied 7–7. Drive: 8 plays, 75 yards, 3:49.
- UCF – Josh Derry 12-yard pass from Keyone Jenkins (Will Stone Kick), 2:37, Knights 14–7. Drive: 7 plays, 75 yards, 3:42.

Second quarter

- OKST – Morgan McPhaul 1-yard run (Sam Keltner kick), 13:03 Tied 14–14. Drive: 12 plays, 75 yards, 4:34.
- OKST – Justin Bowick 18-yard pass from Drew Mestemaker (Sam Keltner Kick), 2:03, Cowboys 21–14. Drive: 5 plays, 60 yards, 2:03.
- UCF – Tyren Hornes 3-yard pass from Keyone Jenkins (Will Stone Kick), 0:13, Tied 21–21. Drive: 12 plays, 75 yards, 1:50.

Third quarter

- OKST – Sam Keltner 40-yard field goal, 7:19, Cowboys 24–21. Drive: 9 plays, 63 yards, 3:44.

Fourth quarter

- OKST – Sam Keltner 29-yard field goal, 12:11, Cowboys 27–21. Drive: 8 plays, 62 yards, 3:06.
- OKST – Evan Jackson 28-yard fumble return, 10:32 (Drew Mestemaker run), Cowboys 35–21. Drive: 5 plays, 2 yards, 1:33.
- OKST – Wyatt Young 5-yard pass from Drew Mestemaker (Sam Keltner Kick), 7:30, Cowboys 42–21. Drive: 3 plays, 34 yards, 1:25.
- UCF – Caden Piening 4-yard pass from Keyone Jenkins (Will Stone Kick), 3:57, Cowboys 42–28. Drive: 11 plays, 75 yards, 3:33.

Statistics	UCF	OKST
First downs	27	22
Plays–yards	83–375	60–414
Rushes–yards	41–110	32–110
Passing yards	265	304
Passing: comp–att–int	30–42–1	19–28–0
Time of possession	35:15	24:45

Team	Category	Player	Statistics
UCF	Passing	Keyone Jenkins	30/42, 265 yards, 4 TD, 1 INT
UCF	Rushing	Duke Watson	21 carries, 79 yards
UCF	Receiving	Josh Derry	11 receptions, 84 yards, 1 TD
Oklahoma State	Passing	Drew Mestemaker	19/28, 304 yards, 2 TD
Oklahoma State	Rushing	Caleb Hawkins	23 carries, 83 yards
Oklahoma State	Receiving	Justin Bowick	6 receptions, 98 yards, 1 TD

The Knights defense forced a fumble on the second play of the game. Quarterback Keyone Jenkins drove the Knights to a touchdown, and an early 7–0 lead on the road at #18 Oklahoma State. The game was tied 21–21 at halftime, but the Cowboys would surge past the Knights in the second half. Trailing by just six points in the fourth quarter, Jenkins threw a backwards pass intended for Ric'Darious Farmer which fell incomplete and was ruled a fumble/lateral. The ball was scooped up by Evan Jackson and returned for a touchdown - a play that broke the game wide open for Oklahoma State.

UCF lost their 12th consecutive road game, and fell to 3–3 (1–2 in Big 12).

=== vs No. 2 BYU ===
No. 2 BYU Cougars (6–0) at UCF Knights (3–3) – Game summary

Quarter	1	2	3	4	OT	2OT	Total
No. 2 Cougars	7	7	7	3	7	0	31
Knights	0	17	7	0	7	8	39

at Acrisure Bounce House • Orlando, Florida

- Date: Saturday October 24, 2026
- Game time: 3:30 p.m. EDT
- Game weather: Cloudy, scattered showers • Temperature: 78 °F (26 °C) • Wind: SW at 14 mph
- Game attendance: 45,112
- Referee: Michael McCabe
- TV announcers (Fox): Connor Onion, Robert Griffin III, and Alexa Landestoy
- Preview • Recap • Gamecast

Game information

First quarter

- BYU – Kyler Kasper 27-yard pass from Bear Bachmeier (Matthias Dunn Kick), 8:19, Cougars 7–0. Drive: 11 plays, 84 yards, 5:49.

Second quarter

- UCF – Landen Chambers 2-yard run (Will Stone Kick), 13:44, Tied 7–7. Drive: 8 plays, 62 yards, 4:10.
- UCF – Will Stone 20-yard field goal, 8:10, Knights 10–7. Drive: 12 plays, 64 yards, 5:09.
- BYU – Bear Bachmeier 1-yard run (Matthias Dunn Kick), 3:47, Cougars 14–10. Drive: 8 plays, 75 yards, 4:23.
- UCF – Landen Chambers 6-yard pass from Keyone Jenkins (Will Stone Kick), 0:04, Knights 17–14. Drive: 11 plays, 78 yards, 1:18.

Third quarter

- BYU – Sione Moa 1-yard run (Matthias Dunn Kick), 9:45, Cougars 21–17. Drive: 9 plays, 75 yards, 5:15.
- UCF – Keyone Jenkins 1-yard run (Will Stone Kick), 3:06, Knights 24–21. Drive: 11 plays, 75 yards, 6:39.

Fourth quarter

- BYU – Matthias Dunn 47-yard field goal, 12:09, Tied 24–24. Drive: 12 plays, 46 yards, 5:57.

Overtime

- BYU – Legend Glasker 28-yard pass from Bear Bachmeier (Matthias Dunn Kick), Cougars 31–24. Drive: 3 plays, 25 yards.
- UCF – Josh Derry 25-yard pass from Keyone Jenkins (Will Stone Kick), 0:04, Tied 31–31. Drive: 1 play, 25 yards.

2nd Overtime

- UCF – Grayson Brousseau 4-yard pass from Keyone Jenkins (Keyone Jenkins pass to Tyren Hornes), Knights 39–31. Drive: 7 plays, 25 yards.

Statistics	BYU	UCF
First downs	18	26
Plays–yards	68–373	83–463
Rushes–yards	36–116	41–170
Passing yards	257	293
Passing: comp–att–int	16–32–1	25–42–0
Time of possession	27:25	32:35

Team	Category	Player	Statistics
BYU	Passing	Bear Bachmeier	16/32, 257 yards, 2 TD, 1 INT
BYU	Rushing	Preston Rex	5 carries, 42 yards
BYU	Receiving	Kyler Kasper	6 receptions, 129 yards, 1 TD
UCF	Passing	Keyone Jenkins	25/41, 293 yards, 3 TD
UCF	Rushing	Duke Watson	15 carries, 94 yards
UCF	Receiving	Tyren Hornes	6 receptions, 137 yards

After a bye week, UCF hosted #2 BYU on homecoming. Quarterback Keyone Jenkins threw three touchdown passes, and ran for a touchdown as the Knights upset the Cougars 39–31 in double overtime. The win marked the highest-ranked opponent UCF has defeated in program history.

UCF took a 10–7 lead midway through the second quarter. BYU responded with an 8-play, 75 yard drive. Facing 3rd & Goal at the UCF 1, Bear Bachmeier scored on a quarterback run, and the Cougars led 14–10. On their next drive, however, Bachmeier was intercepted by Tackett Curtis at the UCF 21. With just 1:22 left in the half, Jenkins drove the Knights down the field for a score. Landen Chambers' touchdown catch with 4 seconds left in the half gave the Knights a 17–14 halftime advantage.

BYU got the ball to start the third quarter. Another Knights defensive goal line stand failed, as Sione Moa scored on a 3rd & Goal inside the 1. On the ensuing possession, trailing 21–17, UCF faced a critical 3rd & 17 at their own 29. Jenkins connected on a screen pass to Tyren Hornes, who broke free and ran down the left sideline for a 56-yard gain to the BYU 15. Six plays later, the Knights were in the endzone again with a 1-yard run by Jenkins. The third quarter came to an end with the Knights up 24–21.

The Cougars managed a field goal, and a 24–24 tie with 12:09 left in regulation. That set stage for a wild conclusion to the fourth quarter. After three-and-outs by both teams, UCF got the ball at the 38 yard line with 8:59 left. The Knights drove 61 yards in 12 plays, reaching the BYU 1 yard line. On 4th & Goal inside the 1, UCF went for it, with Keyone Jenkins tackled short of the goal line. BYU took over on downs inside their own 1. The Knights defense stiffened, and forced a punt. UCF got the ball at their own 31 yard line for one last drive with 42 seconds on the clock. After a 21-yard catch by Landen Chambers, and a penalty on the Cougars (and an apparent fumble by Jenkins which was recovered by BYU, but reviewed and overturned), UCF reached the BYU 28. The Knights lined up for a 46-yard field goal attempt with 10 seconds left. Will Stone's kick was blocked, but recovered and advanced by Stone, whose helmet came off on the play. The officials ruled that a 10-second runoff was required, and as a result time expired and the game went to overtime.

In the first overtime period, Bear Bachmeier threw a 28-yard touchdown pass to Legend Glasker. The Knights answered with one play. Keyone Jenkins avoided a sack, rolled out to his left, and found Josh Derry for a wide-open touchdown, and a 31–31 tie. In the second overtime, UCF got the ball first. Will Stone kicked a go-ahead field goal, but the play was nullified by a Roughing the Kicker penalty on BYU. Two plays later, Jenkins found Grayson Brousseau for a 4-yard touchdown. Brousseau was met at 1 yard line, but leaned forward and stretched his body over the goal line for the score. On the two-point conversion attempt, Jenkins rolled left under pressure and found Tyren Hornes down low in the back of the endzone, and the Knights went up 39–31. On BYU's subsequent possession, the Cougars faced 4th & Goal at the 4 yard line. Bachmeier's pass intended for Walker Lyons fell incomplete, and the game was over. UCF fans stormed the field, and celebrated their first victory against a top-five ranked team.

The Knights improved to 4–3 (2–2 in Big 12) on the season, and 4–0 at home. The game registered an audience of 4.74 million viewers, with a peak of 10 million.

=== vs Baylor ===
Baylor Bears (4–3) at UCF Knights (4–3) – Game summary

Quarter	1	2	3	4	Total
Bears	7	13	14	7	41
Knights	0	6	3	0	9

at Acrisure Bounce House • Orlando, Florida

- Date: Friday October 30, 2026
- Game time: 7:30 p.m. EDT
- Game weather: Cloudy • Temperature: 80 °F (27 °C) • Wind: NE at 11 miles per hour (18 km/h)
- Game attendance: 45,906
- Referee: Michael VanderVelde
- TV announcers (ESPN): Mike Monaco, Jordan Rodgers
- Preview • Recap • Gamecast

Game information

First quarter

- BAY – Tony Livingston 4-yard pass from DJ Lagway (Rhett Armstrong Kick), 4:06, Bears 7–0. Drive: 7 plays, 46 yards, 3:08.

Second quarter

- BAY – Caden Knighten 2-yard run (Rhett Armstrong Kick), 8:58, Bears 14–0. Drive: 8 plays, 63 yards, 3:21.
- UCF – Will Stone 39-yard field goal, 3:24, Bears 14–3. Drive: 11 plays, 54 yards, 5:34.
- BAY – Rhett Armstrong 45-yard field goal, 1:44, Bears 17–3. Drive: 5 plays, 58 yards, 1:34.
- BAY – Rhett Armstrong 29-yard field goal, 0:28, Bears 20–3. Drive: 5 plays, 43 yards, 0:52.
- UCF – Will Stone 57-yard field goal, 0:00, Bears 20–6. Drive: 4 plays, 36 yards, 0:28.

Third quarter

- BAY – Tony Livingston 21-yard pass from DJ Lagway (Rhett Armstrong Kick), 10:07, Bears 27–6. Drive: 4 plays, 63 yards, 1:26.
- BAY – Gavin Freeman 77-yard pass from DJ Lagway (Rhett Armstrong Kick), 8:29, Bears 34–6. Drive: 3 plays, 77 yards, 0:25.
- UCF – Will Stone 35-yard field goal, 6:24, Bears 34–9. Drive: 5 plays, 58 yards, 2:05.

Fourth quarter

- BAY – Matthew Klopfenstein 5-yard pass from DJ Lagway (Rhett Armstrong Kick), 12:33, Bears 41–9. Drive: 4 plays, 35 yards, 1:37.

Statistics	BAY	UCF
First downs	19	14
Plays–yards	67–503	67–281
Rushes–yards	42–184	30–66
Passing yards	319	215
Passing: comp–att–int	16–25–0	22–37–1
Time of possession	29:08	30:52

Team	Category	Player	Statistics
Baylor	Passing	DJ Lagway	16/25, 319 yards, 4 TD
Baylor	Rushing	Ryelan Morris	11 carries, 82 yards
Baylor	Receiving	Gavin Freeman	5 receptions, 114 yards, TD
UCF	Passing	Alonza Barnett III	8/16, 133 yards
UCF	Rushing	Rocco Marriott	2 carries, 50 yards
UCF	Receiving	Josh Derry	3 receptions, 70 yards

UCF hosted Baylor on Friday night in the tenth edition of the Space Game. Going into the game, Baylor fired head coach Dave Aranda and defensive coordinator Joe Klanderman was named interim coach. The Knights fell by the score of 41–9. Quarterback Keyone Jenkins left the game with an injury in the third quarter, and was replaced by Alonza Barnett. The lone highlight of the night was kicker Will Stone's school record 57-yard field goal in the second quarter.

With the loss, the Knights slipped to 4–4 (2–3 in Big 12).

=== at Kansas ===
UCF Knights (4–4) at Kansas Jayhawks (3–5) – Game summary

Quarter	1	2	3	4	Total
Knights	3	9	14	7	33
Jayhawks	7	0	7	18	32

at David Booth Kansas Memorial Stadium • Lawrence, Kansas

- Date: Saturday November 7, 2026
- Game time: 2:45 p.m. CST / 3:45 p.m. EST
- Game weather: Mostly sunny • Temperature: 53 °F (12 °C)
- Game attendance: 31,008
- Referee: Tutashinda Salaam
- TV announcers (ESPN2): Courtney Lyle, Rene Ingoglia
- Preview • Recap • Gamecast

Game information

First quarter

- KU – Isaiah Marshall 1-yard run (Martin Connington Kick), 10:25, Jayhawks 7–0. Drive: 4 plays, 3 yards, 2:01.
- UCF – Will Stone 37-yard field goal, 6:21, Jayhawks 7–3. Drive: 9 plays, 46 yards, 4:04.

Second quarter

- UCF – Duane Thomas Jr. 10-yard run (Will Stone kick failed), 12:03, Knights 9–7. Drive: 9 plays, 65 yards, 4:23.
- UCF – Will Stone 23-yard field goal, 5:55, Knights 12–7. Drive: 11 plays, 51 yards, 5:08.

Third quarter

- UCF – Taevion Swint 1-yard run (Will Stone kick), 11:56, Knights 19–7. Drive: 6 plays, 50 yards, 2:57.
- UCF – Josh Derry 44-yard pass from Alonza Barnett III (Will Stone kick), 9:52, Knights 26–7. Drive: 2 plays, 46 yards, 0:49.
- KU – Isaiah Marshall 30-yard run (Martin Connington Kick), 4:17, Knights 26–14. Drive: 10 plays, 75 yards, 5:35.

Fourth quarter

- KU – Khijohnn Cummings-Coleman 1-yard run (Martin Connington Kick), 11:26, Knights 26–21. Drive: 14 plays, 80 yards, 6:12.
- KU – Martin Connington 34-yard field goal, 5:29, Knights 26–24. Drive: 8 plays, 58 yards, 3:37.
- KU – Dylan Edwards 2-yard run (Isaiah Marshall pass to Nik McMillan), 1:06, Jayhawks 32–26. Drive: 11 plays, 95 yards, 1:21.
- UCF – Caden Piening 6-yard pass from Alonza Barnett III (Will Stone kick), 0:01, Knights 33–32. Drive: 10 plays, 73 yards, 1:00.

Statistics	UCF	KU
First downs	23	19
Plays–yards	68–358	71–404
Rushes–yards	37–107	39–194
Passing yards	251	210
Passing: comp–att–int	18–31–1	21–32–0
Time of possession	30:34	29:26

Team	Category	Player	Statistics
UCF	Passing	Alonza Barnett III	18/31, 133 yards, 2 TD, INT
UCF	Rushing	Landen Chambers	13 carries, 40 yards
UCF	Receiving	Josh Derry	8 receptions, 143 yards, TD
Kansas	Passing	Isaiah Marshall	21/32, 210 yards
Kansas	Rushing	Isaiah Marshall	13 carries, 125 yards, 2 TD
Kansas	Receiving	Nik McMillan	6 receptions, 31 yards

Alonza Barnett's 6-yard touchdown pass to redshirt freshman Caden Piening with 1 second left lifted UCF over the Kansas Jayhawks. The Knights snapped a 12-game road losing streak, and they improved to 5–4 on the season (3–3 in Big 12). The Knights blew a 19-point lead, but they rallied for the game-winning touchdown drive in the final minute. It was UCF's first road victory since defeating TCU 35–34 on September 14, 2024 (which was during the Gus Malzahn era). It was Barnett's first start at quarterback since Week 2 against Pitt, though he did see some playing time in the second half of Week 9 versus Baylor.

On UCF's first play from scrimmage, quarterback Alonza Barnett was hit as he threw, and his pass sailed. The ball was intercepted by Trey Lathan, and it was ultimately returned to the UCF 3 yard line. Three plays later Isaiah Marshall's 1-yard touchdown run gave the Jayhawks an early 7–0 lead. The Knights answered with a field goal, then put together a 9-play, 65-yard drive culminating in a touchdown run by Landen Chambers. The extra point was missed, and UCF led 9–7. The Knights defense would hold Kansas mostly at bay in the first half, forcing five punts, and one turnover. The Knights led 12–7 at halftime.

UCF got the ball to start the third quarter. Taevion Swint's 43-yard kickoff return set the Knights up at midfield. Landen Chambers had runs of 19 yards and 7 yards, as the Knights quickly marched into Jayhawks territory. Josh Derry caught a short pass at the Kansas 12, then shook tackles down to the 1 yard line. Swint capped off the drive with a 1-yard touchdown run and a 19–7 lead. On the ensuing drive, a Khijohnn Cummings-Coleman fumble was recovered by Braeden Marshall at the Kansas 46. Two plays later, Barnett threw a 44-yard touchdown bomb to Josh Derry, and the Knights were up 26–7.

Kansas rallied, scoring 25 unanswered points. UCF clung to a 26–24 lead when Atticus Bertrams' punt pinned the Jayhawks back at their own 5. Tate Nagy muffed the punt, but managed to recover. Kansas converted on a 4th & 4 at their own 11, then Isaiah Marshall found Nahzae Cox for a 42-yard catch down to the UCF 5. A 1-yard touchdown run by Dylan Edwards game Kansas a 32–26 lead with 1:01 to go.

UCF started their drive at the Kansas 27. After two incompletions, Barnett found Tyren Hornes for a 20-yard gain to keep the drive alive. He then connected to Chase Hinshaw, who got out of bounds after a 20-yard pickup. With 19 seconds on the clock, facing 3rd & 11 at the 34, Barnett eluded a tackle, and threw downfield to Josh Derry. Derry got out of bounds at the Kansas 15 with 13 seconds to go. On 1st & 10, Barnett pass to Waden Charles in the back left corner of the endzone was initially ruled a touchdown, but overturned on instant replay review. On the next play, Alonza's pass to Caden Piening fell incomplete, but Jalen Todd was called for pass interference. That set up a 1st & Goal at the Kansas 6 with four seconds on the clock. Barnett took a shotgun snap, rolled to his left, and found Caden Piening just inside the goal line at the left pylon for the game-tying touchdown. The play was reviewed, and after a lengthy consultation, was upheld. Will Stone's extra point gave UCF the 33–32 victory.

=== vs Arizona State ===
Arizona State Sun Devils (5–4) at UCF Knights (5–4) – Game summary

Quarter	1	2	3	4	Total
Sun Devils	0	16	0	10	26
Knights	0	7	0	6	13

at Acrisure Bounce House • Orlando, Florida

- Date: Saturday November 14, 2026
- Game time: 3:30 p.m. EST (postponed to 5:35 p.m. due to ground stop)
- Game weather: Cloudy • Temperature: 60 °F (16 °C) • Wind: S at 11 mph
- Game attendance: 44,114
- Referee: Cravonne Barrett
- TV announcers (ESPNU): Chuckie Kempf, Dustin Fox
- Preview • Recap • Gamecast

Game information

First quarter

- No scoring plays

Second quarter

- ASU – Marquis Gillis 1-yard run (Carson Smith Kick), 14:55, Sun Devils 7–0. Drive: 10 plays, 74 yards, 5:38.
- ASU – Carson Smith 51-yard field goal, 4:18, Sun Devils 10–0. Drive: 12 plays, 47 yards, 5:22.
- UCF – Landen Chambers 2-yard run (Will Stone kick), 1:53, Sun Devils 10–7. Drive: 6 plays, 67 yards, 2:19.
- ASU – Carson Smith 41-yard field goal, 0:43, Sun Devils 13–7. Drive: 7 plays, 52 yards, 1:10.
- ASU – Carson Smith 28-yard field goal, 0:16, Sun Devils 16–7. Drive: 4 plays, 9 yards, 0:20.

Third quarter

- No scoring plays

Fourth quarter

- ASU – Cardae Mack 8-yard run (Carson Smith Kick), 13:39, Sun Devils 23–7. Drive: 14 plays, 81 yards, 7:16.
- ASU – Carson Smith 37-yard field goal, 6:02, Sun Devils 26–7. Drive: 8 plays, 36 yards, 5:09.
- UCF – Tyren Hornes 40-yard pass from Alonza Barnett III (Pass failed), 2:12, Sun Devils 26–13. Drive: 3 plays, 57 yards, 0:34.

Statistics	ASU	UCF
First downs	23	15
Plays–yards	79–389	54–311
Rushes–yards	42–165	23–54
Passing yards	224	257
Passing: comp–att–int	22–37–0	21–31–0
Time of possession	37:45	22:15

Team	Category	Player	Statistics
Arizona State	Passing	Jake Fette	21/36, 196 yards
Arizona State	Rushing	Cardae Mack	25 carries, 111 yards, TD
Arizona State	Receiving	Reed Harris	7 receptions, 80 yards
UCF	Passing	Alonza Barnett III	21/30, 257 yards, TD
UCF	Rushing	Landen Chambers	7 carries, 54 yards, TD
UCF	Receiving	Josh Derry	7 receptions, 137 yards

UCF hosted Arizona State. Due to delays from the FAA ground stop, the Sun Devils did not travel to Orlando until game day morning. The game was postponed two hours to allow for arrival. The Sun Devils defeated the Knights 26–13.

The Knights slipped to 5–5 on the season (3–4 in Big 12).

=== vs Iowa State ===
Iowa State Cyclones (5–5) at UCF Knights (5–5) – Game summary

Quarter	1	2	3	4	Total
Cyclones	3	7	7	0	17
Knights	3	21	7	17	48

at Acrisure Bounce House • Orlando, Florida

- Date: Friday November 20, 2026
- Game time: 6:00 p.m. EST
- Game attendance: 34,043
- TV announcers (FS1): Noah Reed, Petros Papadakis
- Preview • Recap • Gamecast

Game information

First quarter

- ISU – Kyle Konrardy 27-yard field goal, 8:31, Cyclones 3–0. Drive: 12 plays, 66 yards, 6:29.
- UCF – Will Stone 24-yard field goal, 3:28, Tied 3–3. Drive: 12 plays, 69 yards, 5:03.

Second quarter

- UCF – Josh Derry 21-yard pass from Alonza Barnett III (Will Stone kick), 13:09, Knights 10–3. Drive: 7 plays, 60 yards, 2:44.
- UCF – Josh Derry 65-yard pass from Alonza Barnett III (Will Stone kick), 8:49, Knights 17–3. Drive: 3 plays, 70 yards, 0:33.
- UCF – Alonza Barnett III 15-yard run (Will Stone kick), 8:33, Knights 24–3. Drive: 1 play, 15 yards, 0:08.
- ISU – Aiden Flora 17-yard run (Kyle Konrardy kick), 6:31, Knights 24–10. Drive: 6 plays, 75 yards, 2:02.

Third quarter

- UCF – Josh Derry 24-yard pass from Alonza Barnett III (Will Stone kick), 11:11, Knights 31–10. Drive: 9 plays, 75 yards, 3:49.
- ISU – Aiden Flora 17-yard run (Kyle Konrardy kick), 9:55, Knights 31–17. Drive: 2 plays, 75 yards, 1:10.

Fourth quarter

- UCF – Duane Thomas Jr. 2-yard run (Will Stone kick), 14:25, Knights 38–17. Drive: 4 plays, 44 yards, 1:47.
- UCF – Will Stone 38-yard field goal, 9:27, Knights 41–17. Drive: 7 plays, 14 yards, 3:43.
- UCF – Jacob Maiava 5-yard pass from Alonza Barnett III (Will Stone kick), 6:35, Knights 48–17. Drive: 3 plays, 10 yards, 1:35.

Statistics	ISU	UCF
First downs	15	23
Plays–yards	57–298	69–460
Rushes–yards	34–189	42–205
Passing yards	109	255
Passing: comp–att–int	14–23–1	17–27–0
Time of possession	27:15	32:45

Team	Category	Player	Statistics
Iowa State	Passing	Jaylen Raynor	14/23, 109 yard, 1 INT
Iowa State	Rushing	Aiden Flora	23 carries, 171 yards, 2 TD
Iowa State	Receiving	Omari Hayes	2 receptions, 29 yards
UCF	Passing	Alonza Barnett III	17/27, 255 yards, 4 TD
UCF	Rushing	Duke Watson	16 carries, 113 yards
UCF	Receiving	Josh Derry	4 receptions, 125 yards, 3 TD

UCF hosted Iowa State on Senior night, their final home game of the season. The Knights routed the Cyclones 48–17 to improve to 6–5 on the season (4–4 in Big 12), and became bowl eligible for the first time since 2023. Quarterback Alonza Barnett III threw four touchdown passes, and ran for another touchdown. Wide receiver Josh Derry caught three of the touchdown passes, including a 65-yard catch-and-run in the second quarter. The Knights defense forced four turnovers by Iowa State (three fumbles and one interception), along with two turnovers on downs.

Tied 3–3 at the end of the first quarter, the Knights exploded into the lead in the second quarter. Barnett found Josh Derry for a 21-yard touchdown pass, and a 10–3 lead. After sacking Jaylen Raynor and forcing an Iowa State punt, the Knights got the ball back. Barnett connected with Derry again, who sprinted untouched for a 65-yard touchdown. On the first play of the ensuing drive, Raynor fumbled the snap, and it was scooped up by UCF linebacker Lewis Carter at the 15 yard line. The Knights offense struck quickly. Alonza Barnett on a quarterback keeper, shook an ankle tackle, and dove across the goal line for the touchdown. The Knights led 24–10 at the half.

UCF got the ball to start the second half. Barnett drove the Knights 75 yard in 9 plays, capping the drive off with a 24-yard touchdown pass to a wide open Josh Derry, his third of the night. The UCF defense would force two more turnovers in the second half, and converted both into touchdowns. UCF pulled away for a 48–17 victory, their first win against the Cyclones. The Knights combined for 205 yard rushing, outgaining Aiden Flora (171 yards), who came into the game as the nation's leading rusher.

=== at Colorado ===
UCF Knights (0–0) at Colorado Buffaloes (0–0) – Game summary

Quarter	1	2	3	4	Total
Knights	0	0	0	0	0
Buffaloes	0	0	0	0	0

at Folsom Field • Boulder, Colorado

- Date: Saturday November 28, 2026
- Game time: 12:00 p.m. MST / 2:00 p.m. EST

Statistics	UCF	COLO
First downs		
Plays–yards		
Rushes–yards		
Passing yards		
Passing: comp–att–int		
Time of possession		

Team	Category	Player	Statistics
UCF	Passing		
UCF	Rushing		
UCF	Receiving		
Colorado	Passing		
Colorado	Rushing		
Colorado	Receiving		

== Personnel ==
=== Roster and coaching staff ===
==== Coaching staff additions ====
Name	Position	Old team	Old position
Cooper Bassett	Tight ends	Oklahoma State	Offensive line coach
AJ Blazek	Offensive line	Wisconsin	Offensive line coach
Kefense Hynson	Pass game coordinator	Tampa Bay Buccaneers	Pass game coordinator
David Overstreet II	Cornerbacks	Dallas Cowboys	Secondary/cornerbacks coach
Eric Terrazas	Senior offensive analyst	Kansas	Offensive analyst

- : retained

==== Coaching staff departures ====
Name	Position	New team	New position
Shawn Clark (Note: Clark died September 21, 2025.)	Offensive line coach	N/A	N/A
Brandon Harris	Defensive backs coach	Florida	Cornerbacks coach
Danny Hope	Interim Co-offensive line coach	N/A	N/A
Jeris McIntyre	Director of high school relations	Auburn	Director of football & alumni relations
Deshon Lawrence	Senior Director of Player Development	Missouri	Director of Player & Recruiting Engagement
Demeitre Brim	Defensive analyst/Assistant defensive line coach	Dallas Cowboys	Assistant defensive line coach
Jordan Johnson	Offensive analyst/Assistant running backs coach	Concord	Offensive line coach
Alex Ward	Offensive quality control coach	Houston Texans	Offensive assistant

==== Roster ====
2026 UCF Knights Football
Quarterbacks: 8 Rocco Marriott – Fr.; 10 Kaleb Annett – (redshirt) So.; 12 Keyone Jenkins – Sr.; 14 Alonza Barnett III – (redshirt) Sr.; 16 Dante Carr – Fr.; Running backs: 4 Taevion Swint – (redshirt) Fr.; 11 Landen Chambers – (redshirt) Jr.; 20 Kaj Baker – Fr.; 24 Arthur Lewis IV – Fr.; 26 Duke Watson – Jr.; 35 Agyeman Addae – So.; 42 Chance Nixon – (redshirt) Fr.; Wide receivers: 2 Tyren Hornes – Fr.; 3 Jonathan Bibbs – (redshirt) So.; 5 Josh Derry – Sr.; 6 Ric'Darious "DayDay" Farmer – (redshirt) So.; 7 Duane Thomas Jr. – Sr.; 9 Waden Charles – So.; 13 Caleb Rollerson – (redshirt) So.; 23 Jordan Nunuha – Fr.; 39 Andrea Parisi – (redshirt) So.; 80 Elijah Hardy – Fr.; 81 Zack Palmer – (redshirt) Fr.; 82 Jordyn Bridgewater – (redshirt) So.; 85 Carson Hinshaw – (redshirt) So.; 86 Chase Hinshaw – (redshirt) Fr.; Tight ends: 0 Dylan Wade – Sr.; 18 Caden Piening – (redshirt) Fr.; 47 Sam Powell – Fr.; 83 Dylan Burk – So.; 84 Thomas Wadsworth – (redshirt) Sr.; 87 Brooks Hall – Fr.; 88 Grayson Brousseau – (redshirt) So.	Offensive Lineman: 53 LaParka Langston – (redshirt) Jr.; 54 Cooper Terpstra – (redshirt) Jr.; 55 Jacob Maiava – (redshirt) Fr.; 57 Camp Lott – (redshirt) Fr.; 58 Connor Meadows – (redshirt) Sr.; 61 Owen Spell – Sr.; 66 Brady Wayburn – (redshirt) Sr.; 67 Noah Senka – (redshirt) So.; 68 Ethan Higgins – (redshirt) Jr.; 70 RaiShaun McHaney – (redshirt) Fr.; 71 Amahn Williams – Fr.; 72 Dominick Campbell – (redshirt) Sr.; 73 Henry Tabansi – (redshirt) Jr.; 74 Matthew Prigmore – (redshirt) Jr.; 75 Tyler Gibson – (redshirt) Sr.; 76 Justin Royes – (redshirt) Jr.; 77 Kasiyah Charlton – Fr.; 78 Preston Cushman – (redshirt) Sr.; 79 Daniel Marcellinus – (redshirt) Fr.; Kickers/Punters: 15 Will Stone – (redshirt) Sr.; 31 Noah McGough – (redshirt) Fr.; 49 Atticus Bertrams – Sr.; 97 Mason Denaburg – (redshirt) Fr.; Long snappers: 37 Rocklyn Kelley – (redshirt) Fr.; 44 Kyle Hicks – (redshirt) So.	Defensive tackles: 13 Horace Lockett – (redshirt) Sr.; 42 Artavius Jones – (redshirt) So.; 54 Trenton Turner – (redshirt) Fr.; 55 Noah Mercer – Fr; 90 Mujahid Jefferson – Fr; 91 Donteye Drew – Sr; 92 Jeffson Lafontant – (redshirt) Jr.; 93 Brad Gurley – (redshirt) Sr.; 95 RJ Jackson Jr. – Sr.; 97 Josh Schell – (redshirt) Sr.; 99 Thomas Collins – (redshirt) Jr.; Linebacker: 15 Preston Hall – Fr.; 19 Rashad Henry – (redshirt) Jr.; 20 Lewis Carter – Sr.; 23 Jayden Burnett – Fr.; 24 Tackett Curtis – Sr.; 32 Matthew Occhipinti – Fr.; 33 Phil Picciotti – (redshirt) Jr.; 34 Jahleel Culbreath – (redshirt) Sr.; 32 Dylan Bennett – Fr.; 38 Jayden Jennings – 5th–Sr.; 43 Cole Kozlowski – 5th–Sr.; 47 Arthur Kingdom – Jr.; Defensive back: 1 Jayden Bellamy – (redshirt) Sr.; 4 Braeden Marshall – Sr.; 5 DJ Bell – (redshirt) Sr.; 7 Antione Jackson – Sr.; 8 Demari Henderson – (redshirt) Sr.; 14 Kahmel Johnson – (redshirt) So.; 16 Antonio "TJ" Branch – (redshirt) Fr.; 17 Jailen Duffie – (redshirt) Jr.; 18 Caleb Flagg – (redshirt) Sr.; 21 Ty Bartrum – (redshirt) Sr.; 22 Amarion Queen – Fr.; 23 Jayden Williams – 5th-Sr.; 25 Rukeem Stroud – (redshirt) Fr.; 26 Elijah Keys – Fr.; 27 Nicholas Antoine – (redshirt) Sr.; 28 Matt Irwin – Jr.; 29 Tyce Porcher – Fr.; 30 Otis Hardy – Fr.; 49 Donnell Johnson – (redshirt) Jr.	Defensive ends: 6 Isaiah Nixon – (redshirt) Jr.; 10 Sincere Edwards – Jr.; 11 Ken Talley – (redshirt) Sr.; 12 Aymeric Koumba – (redshirt) Jr.; 41 Bruno Dall – (redshirt) Jr.; 45 Quentin Hatch – (redshirt) Sr.; 56 Patrick Ryan – Fr.; 94 L A Jessie Harrold – (redshirt) Fr.; 96 Anthony Coaxum – 5th-Sr.; 98 Alhassan Iddrissu – Fr.; Legend: (C) Team captain; (S) Suspended; (I) Ineligible; Injured; Redshirt; Coaching staff: Scott Frost – Head Coach; Alex Grinch – Defensive coordinator/Safeties; Steve Cooper – Offensive coordinator; Sean Beckton Sr. – Associate head coach/Wide receivers; Mike Dawson – Defensive run game coordinator/Edge; Kenny Martin – Defensive tackles; Jimmy Beal – Running backs; Mark D'Onofrio – Linebackers; AJ Blazek – Offensive line; David Overstreet II – Cornerbacks; McKenzie Milton – Quarterbacks; Cooper Bassett – Tight ends; Pete Alamar – Special teams coordinator; Kefense Hynson – Pass game coordinator; Alex Farah – Asst. Offensive line; Austin Herink – Senior Offensive Analyst; Eric Terrazas – Senior Offensive Analyst; Drico Johnson – Defensive Analyst; Pete Haffner – Defensive Quality Control; Jihad Woods – Defensive Quality Control; Damion Daniels – Defensive Quality Control; Geron Hargon – Special Teams Quality Control; Andrew Sims – Chief of Staff; Trent Mossbrucker – General Manager of Football Player Personnel, Acquisitions and Roster Management; Ryan Callaghan – Senior Dir. of FB Operations & Recruiting; Lauryn Ford – Asst. Dir. of Operations; Ryan Beer – Dir. of Player Personnel; Dan Pirtle – Dir. of Player Personnel; Malcolm Folk – Player Personnel Analyst, Football; Zach Duval – Director, Sports Performance; Andrew Strop – Associate Director, Sports Performance; Sean Beckton Jr. – Asst. Dir. of Sports Performance; Jordan Litten – Dir. of FB Creative & Athletic Branding; Brad Helton – Asst. AD, Video Operations; Brian Lund – Associate AD. Head Football Athletic Trainer, Sports Medicine; Diarmuid Christie – Asst. Athletic Trainer; Kyle Flora – Asst. Athletic Trainer; Elisabeth Bird – Athletic Trainer; Austin Seymour – Associate Director, Equipment; Schuyler Silverglate – Asst. Director, Equipment Operations; → Roster updated June, 2026 → Depth chart updated June, 2026

== Awards and honors ==
Player	Position	Award(s)
Demari Henderson	DB	Week 3 — Big 12 Defensive Player of the Week
Multiple players	DL	Week 4 — Big 12 Defensive Line of the Week
Scott Frost	Head coach	Week 8 — Bear Bryant National Coach of the Week Award
Keyone Jenkins	QB	Week 8 — Big 12 Offensive Player of the Week; Week 8 — Maxwell Award Player of the Week; Week 8 — Davey O'Brien Award National Quarterback of the Week; Week 8 — Manning Award Star of the Week
Atticus Bertrams	P	Week 8 — Ray Guy Award "Ray's 8"
Multiple players	—	Week 8 — FWAA/Pop-Tarts Bowl Crazy Good Team of the Week
