= John Murdin =

English cricketer

Personal information
- Full name: John Vernon Murdin
- Born: 16 August 1891; Wollaston, Northamptonshire, England
- Died: 11 April 1971 (aged 79); Stonehouse, Gloucestershire, England
- Batting: Right-handed
- Bowling: Right-arm fast
- Role: Bowler

Domestic team information
- Years: Team
- 1913–1927: Northamptonshire

Career statistics
Competition	FC
Matches	173
Runs scored	1,800
Batting average	8.57
100s/50s	0/1
Top score	90*
Balls bowled	22,846
Wickets	455
Bowling average	27.08
5 wickets in innings	28
10 wickets in match	4
Best bowling	8/81
Catches/stumpings	111/–
- Source: ESPNcricinfo, 12 March 2024

John Vernon Murdin (16 August 1891 – 11 April 1971) was a professional cricketer who spent his entire career at Northamptonshire. Although he was predominantly a bowler, the highlight of his 14-year playing career was his county record last wicket partnership with fellow Wollaston-born player Ben Bellamy of 148. John Murdin died in 1971 in Stonehouse, Gloucestershire.

== Career ==
Murdin was a regular bowler for Northamptonshire either side of World War I, taking over 450 wickets for his home county including the 28 occasions he took 5 wickets in an innings. Murdin - often referred to by his middle name, Vernon - made his debut in 1913, taking David Denton of Yorkshire as his first victim. In 1920, Murdin achieved a hat-trick against Kent at the County Ground. Despite it being Northamptonshire's heaviest first-class defeat, in 1921 when Australia visited Northamptonshire, Murdin bowled Edgar Mayne on the first ball of the match and finished with figures of 5–157, with the dismissals of Nip Pellew, Johnny Taylor, Jack Gregory and Arthur Mailey on top of the Mayne wicket. The next summer was the best of his career; throughout the course of the 1922 season he took 91 wickets including his career best of 8–81 against Glamorgan at Swansea and 7–44 in a home fixture with Kent, both of which were match-winning efforts. In the record breaking last wicket partnership in 1925, Murdin himself scored 90* - not only his career best batting score, but also his only innings in which he achieved a half-century. Although he never recaptured his form from 1922, Murdin was granted a testimonial in 1928 against possibly his favourite opponents, Kent. By this point his first-class playing career was over, having accepted a coaching role at Wycliffe College in Gloucestershire, the county where he saw out the remainder of his life.
