= Bel Ami (disambiguation) =

Bel Ami is a novel by Guy de Maupassant.

Bel Ami may also refer to:

== Adaptations ==
- Bel Ami (1939 film), a film adaptation of the novel
- Bel Ami (1947 film), a Mexican historical drama film
- Bel Ami (1955 film), a film adaptation of the novel
- Bel Ami (1968 film), a German TV film adaptation on Süddeutscher Rundfunk
- Bel Ami (2005 film), a French TV film adaptation on RTBF & France 2
- Bel Ami (2012 film), a film adaptation of the novel
- Bel Ami (British TV series), 1971 British TV series
- Bel Ami (French TV mini series), 1983 French TV mini series

== Other uses ==
- BelAmi, a Slovak gay pornographic film studio named after the novel
- Bel Ami (South Korean TV series), also known as Pretty Man, a 2013–2014 Korean TV series

== See also ==
- Belle Amie (disambiguation)
- Bellamy (disambiguation)
