= Charles James Beverley =

British naval surgeon and naturalist

Charles James Beverley FRS (1788 – 16 September 1868) was a British naval surgeon and naturalist.

He was born in Fort Augustus, Scotland, the son of a soldier whose regiment was quartered there at the time. He was apprenticed to a surgeon and entered the navy as an assistant surgeon in 1810. He was employed in that capacity for four years, mainly in the Mediterranean, and was present at the action at Porto d'Anzo in 1813. Failing health resulted in him being sent home in care of the sick and wounded.

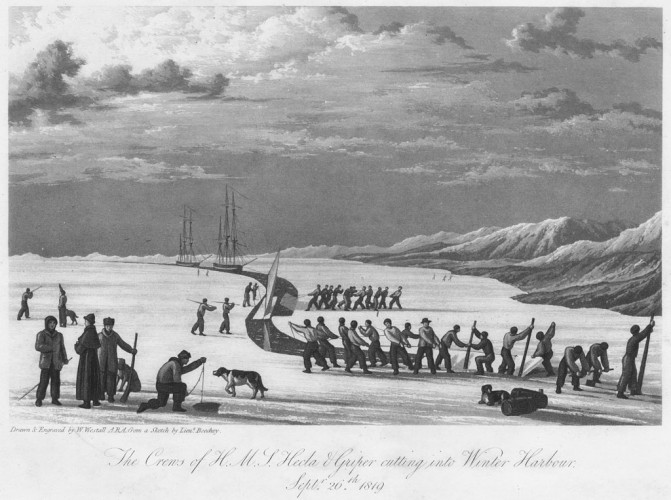
"The Crews of H.M.S. Hecla & Griper Cutting Into Winter Harbour, Sept. 26th, 1819". An engraving from a journal published in 1821.

After recovering he was appointed to HMS Tiber, and served in that ship until 1818, when he was selected by the admiralty to be assistant surgeon in HMS Isabella, which was about to proceed under the command of Sir John Ross in an unsuccessful mission to the Polar regions to seek a Northwest Passage. In 1819-20 he served under Sir Edward Parry in a more successful repeat expedition as assistant surgeon on HMS Griper, passing the winter at Winter Harbour on Melville Island. On his return from the Arctic, being highly commended for his skill and care in his attendance on the sick, Beverley was promoted to the rank of full surgeon.

On 5 May 1821 he was elected a Fellow of the Royal Society. and in 1835 a Fellow of the Linnean Society.

Following an attack of painful ophthalmia he was struck off the list of naval surgeons but in 1827 served as a volunteer under Sir Edward Parry in the capacity of surgeon and naturalist in a long and perilous journey to Spitsbergen, from where, in an attempt to reach the North Pole, they reached the most northerly latitude attained for the next 49 years. He assisted in the collection and naming of botanical specimens, and helped to prepare many of the examples of Arctic zoology which were brought home.

In 1828 he was appointed Medical Superintendent of the notorious Bethnal Green Lunatic Asylum, a post he held for 20 years, during which time he brought about considerable improvement.

He then retired to private practice, dying in 1868 shortly after his 80th birthday. In November 1921 he had married Harriet, the eldest daughter of a Mr. G. Payne of Harley Street, London. They had a son Edward and a daughter Louisa.
