= Bellamy, Virginia =

Unincorporated community in Virginia, United States

Coordinates: 37°23′53″N 76°34′21″W

Bellamy is an unincorporated community in Gloucester County, in the U. S. state of Virginia.
