= RTV Belle Amie =

RTV Belle Amia is a TV station that broadcasts program around the territory of Niš and local areas. Media part of the company was established in the form of private radio station and was on air from 1993 since 2006 when TV Belle Amie started broadcasting.

== RTV Belle Amie show ==
Today, RTV Belle Amie in its regular TV schedule broadcasts following shows:

1. Belle Amie afternoon
2. Belle amie morning
3. Between the lines
4. At the end of the day
5. In the meantime
6. Infobiz
7. And after the news
8. NEWS
9. Belle Amie sport
10. Third halftime
11. Period; On Saturdays
12. Stethoscope
13. Dolce Vita
14. Guests
15. Whole day
16. Apostrophe
17. Statement of the week
18. Rebus
19. Agro Garden
20. Informative talk
21. Rest your brain
22. 7th day

== Partners ==
In the scope of the TV station has been organized journalist redaction that edits daily newspaper People's newspaper.
