= James Bellamy =

James Bellamy may refer to:

- James Bellamy (Upstairs, Downstairs), a fictional character in the ITV period drama Upstairs, Downstairs
- James Bellamy (British academic) (1819–1909), British academic and administrator
- James A. Bellamy (1925–2015), American Professor Emeritus of Arabic Literature
- James William Bellamy (1788–1874), British headmaster of Merchant Taylors' School, Northwood
- Jim Bellamy (1881–1969), English football player and manager
