= Hattie Beverly =

American schoolteacher

- Born: December 1874; Milwaukee, Wisconsin
- Died: 1904; Las Vegas, New Mexico
- Occupation: American schoolteacher
- Known for: First African-American schoolteacher in Grand Rapids, Michigan

Hattie Beverly (1874 – 1904) was the first African American schoolteacher in Grand Rapids, Michigan.

== Biography ==
The second of four daughters, Beverly was born in December 1874 in Milwaukee, Wisconsin, daughter of John W. Beverly, an African American butcher/ businessman, and Johanna Mina "Minnie" Ruesink, a Dutch immigrant. When Beverly was one year old the family moved from to Grand Rapids, Michigan.

In 1895 Beverly graduated from Grand Rapids Central High School majoring in Preparatory English. At this time Grand Rapids had a cadet program to train unmarried women to teach in its schools. Beverly entered this program after high school, graduating in 1899. When it became time to hire her for a teaching position some members of the school board wondered whether an African American should be permitted to teach, and it appeared that she may be denied. After her proponents prevailed, she was hired at Congress Elementary School in June 1899.

In February 1902 she married Major E. Robinson. Since married women were not permitted to teach, she resigned her position at Congress School. About that time she contracted tuberculosis which worsened after the birth of her daughter, Ethel. In 1904 she traveled to a sanitarium in Las Vegas, New Mexico where she succumbed to the disease at 30 years of age.

== Legacy ==
Beverly's nephew John Burgess, son of her youngest sister Ethel Beverly, became the first African American bishop in the Episcopal Church in 1970.

Every year the Grand Rapids Community College awards a Hattie Beverly Education Award to an outstanding African American educator in the Grand Rapids area.

In the fall of 2000, the Hattie Beverly Tutoring Center was created. It serves Grand Rapids's Southeast Side (specifically the Madison Neighborhood).
