= Everly (given name) =

- Gender: unisex

Origin
- Origin: English
- Meaning: "boar wood or clearing”

Other names
- See also: Everleigh

Everly is a given name of English origin that is a transferred use of an English place name and surname.

It has increased in popularity as a given name for girls in recent years in the United States. It first ranked among the 1,000 most used names for newborn girls there in 2012 and has ranked among the top 50 names for American newborn girls since 2019. Variant spellings of the name have also increased in popularity for girls there. Variant spelling Everleigh also ranked among the top 100 names for American girls in 2020. Other spellings include Everlee, Everley, and Everlie. Elaborations of the name such as Everlyn and Everlynn are also in regular use for American girls. The popularity of the name coincides with the popularity of other names with similar sounds such as Evelyn and Emily and other names that originated as surnames or place names.
