= George Bellamy =

George Bellamy may refer to:

- George Bellamy (musician) (born 1941), English musician with The Tornados
- George Anne Bellamy (1727–1788), Irish actress
- George Bellamy (actor) (1866–1944), English film actor of the silent era
- George W. Bellamy (1867–1920), Lieutenant Governor of Oklahoma
