= Benjamin Bellamy =

English cricketer

Personal information
- Full name: Benjamin Walter Bellamy
- Born: 22 April 1891; Wollaston, Northamptonshire, England
- Died: 22 December 1985 (aged 94); Wellingborough, England
- Height: 6 ft 2 in (1.88 m)
- Batting: Right-handed
- Role: Wicket-keeper

Domestic team information
- Years: Team
- 1920–1937: Northamptonshire

Career statistics
Competition	First-class
Matches	354
Runs scored	9,247
Batting average	16.54
100s/50s	4/37
Top score	168
Balls bowled	90
Wickets	0
Bowling average	–
5 wickets in innings	–
10 wickets in match	–
Best bowling	–
Catches/stumpings	529/125
- Source: Cricinfo, 7 August 2009

Benjamin Walter Bellamy (22 April 1891 – 22 December 1985) was a professional cricketer who spent his entire career at Northamptonshire. His career spanned 16 years, retiring in 1935 by which time he had played 351 first-class matches, but returning in a crisis for two games two seasons later.

== Career ==
In his youth, Bellamy focused chiefly on soccer, at which he was good enough to play for Northampton Town as an inside forward. Bellamy joined the ground staff of Northamptonshire, which shared its ground with the soccer club, in 1912, but his powers as a cricketer ripened very slowly indeed. He was denied a regular place in the county team until 1922, due to the First World War and the long career of Walter Buswell. By this time he was thirty-one years old. Bellamy then remained the first choice wicket-keeper for 14 seasons, making his last appearance for the county as a batsman with Ken James having become the preferred wicket keeper.

He was a most unusual wicket-keeper - along with Clyde Walcott probably the tallest to regularly play this position - and his clumsy build suggested a complete lack of style behind the stumps. His debut behind the stumps came in one of the most remarkable county matches of all time. When Northamptonshire played Surrey at Northampton in 1920 the match produced 1,475 runs (a championship record which stood for nearly seventy years), including a century in around 35 minutes by Percy Fender. Bellamy's first victim was Jack Hobbs, and he conceded only 11 byes as Surrey totalled 619-5 declared and 120–2. Initially he was not regarded as a serious batsman, but as early as 1922 Bellamy scored his career best batting total of 168 against an admittedly weak Worcestershire bowling attack. Three years later, after Northamptonshire lost eight wickets for 216 he put on 93 with Phillip Wright for the ninth wicket and with fellow Wollaston boy Vernon Murdin 148 runs for the last wicket against Glamorgan, which is still a county record. Bellamy reached his peak in 1928, when he scored 1,116 runs with two centuries, but injury and age gradually began to catch up with him in the 1930s. He missed the last eighteen games of 1931 and never reached the same records he had in the previous decade during his last four seasons with the side.

Ben Bellamy was well regarded by his county, and as the team were struggling around the time of his career, his competence in cricket was very welcomed. Many famed him for his routine of leaving his motorbike at Wellingborough train station en route to away fixtures. After his retirement, Bellamy spent 22 years as the coach at Wellingborough School. When he died in 1985, aged 94, he was the oldest surviving County Championship cricketer.
