= Richard Bellamy =

Richard Bellamy may refer to:

- Richard Bellamy (art dealer) (1927–1998), American art dealer
- Richard Bellamy (philosopher) (born 1957), British political philosopher
- Richard Bellamy (politician) (1825–1892), farmer, land surveyor and politician in New Brunswick, Canada
- Richard Bellamy (singer) (1743–1813), English bass singer
- Richard Bellamy (Upstairs, Downstairs), a character in the 1971 TV series Upstairs, Downstairs
