= Jayden Bellamy =

American football player (born 2003)

No. 1 – UCF Knights
- Position: Cornerback
- Class: Fifth year

Personal information
- Born: March 11, 2003 (age 23)
- Listed height: 6 ft 1 in (1.85 m)
- Listed weight: 190 lb (86 kg)

Career information
- High school: Bergen Catholic (Oradell, New Jersey)
- College: Notre Dame (2022); Syracuse (2023–2024); UCF (2025–present)
- Stats at ESPN

Jayden Bellamy (born March 11, 2003) is an American college football cornerback for the UCF Knights of the Big 12 Conference. He previously played for the Notre Dame Fighting Irish and Syracuse Orange.

== Early life ==
Raised in North Haledon, New Jersey, Bellamy attended Bergen Catholic High School in Oradell, New Jersey. He was rated as a three-star recruit by Rivals.com and committed to play college football for the Notre Dame Fighting Irish over offers from Clemson, Florida State, Ohio State, and Penn State.

== College career ==
=== Notre Dame ===
As a freshman in 2022, Bellamy did not appear in any games and was redshirted. After the season, he entered the NCAA transfer portal.

=== Syracuse ===
Bellamy transferred to play for the Syracuse Orange. In week 12 of the 2023 season, he intercepted a pass which he returned for his first career touchdown in a win over Pittsburgh. In two seasons at Syracuse from 2023 to 2024, Bellamy totaled 33 tackles, three interceptions, and two touchdowns. After the 2024 season, he once again entered the NCAA transfer portal.

=== UCF ===
Bellamy transferred to play for the UCF Knights. In week one of the 2025 season, Bellamy recorded four tackles and an interception in a victory versus Jacksonville State. He finished the 2025 season with 27 tackles, eight pass deflections, and an interception. In week four of the 2026 season, Bellamy notched an interception and a forced fumble in a win over TCU.

=== Statistics ===
Year	Team	GP	Tackles				Interceptions				Fumbles		
Year	Team	GP	Total	Solo	Ast	Sack	PD	Int	Yds	TD	FF	FR	TD
2022	Notre Dame	0	Did not play										
2023	Syracuse	12	29	23	6	0.0	1	1	23	1	0	2	0
2024	Syracuse	10	37	21	16	0.0	6	2	33	1	0	0	0
2025	UCF	12	27	20	7	0.0	8	1	0	0	0	0	0
2026	UCF	6	16	10	6	0.0	2	1	2	0	1	0	0
Career		40	109	74	35	0.0	17	5	58	2	1	2	0

== Personal life ==
Bellamy is the son of former NFL safety Jay Bellamy.
