= Thomas Bellamy =

Thomas Bellamy may refer to:

- Thomas Bellamy (politician) (1853–1926), Canadian politician
- Thomas Bellamy (writer) (1745–1800), English author
- Thomas Ludford Bellamy (1770–1843), English singer
- Tom Bellamy (born 1980), English multi-instrumentalist
