= Duke Watson =

American football player

No. 26 – UCF Knights
- Position: Running back
- Class: Junior

Personal information
- Listed height: 5 ft 11 in (1.80 m)
- Listed weight: 185 lb (84 kg)

Career information
- High school: Mary Persons (Forsyth, Georgia)
- College: Louisville (2024–2025); UCF (2026–present)
- Stats at ESPN

Duke Watson is an American college football running back for the UCF Knights. He previously played for the Louisville Cardinals.

== Early life ==
Watson attended Mary Persons High School in Forsyth, Georgia. At Mary Persons, he set the school record for career rushing yards. As a senior, Watson rushed for 1,865 yards and 30 touchdowns on 220 carries. Following his graduation, he committed to play college football at the University of Louisville.

== College career ==
Watson saw immediate playing time as a freshman in 2024, rushing for 597 yards and seven touchdowns while leading the NCAA with an average of 8.9 yards per carry. As a sophomore, he dealt with injuries, recording 158 rushing yards and a touchdown. Following the conclusion of the season, Watson entered the transfer portal.

Watson transferred to the University of Central Florida to play for the UCF Knights. In his UCF debut, he rushed for 110 yards and a touchdown on seven carries in a win over Bethune–Cookman.

=== Statistics ===
College statistics
Season	Team	Games	Rushing				Receiving			
Season	Team	GP	Att	Yards	Avg	TD	Rec	Yards	Avg	TD
2024	Louisville	12	67	597	8.9	7	5	60	12.0	1
2025	Louisville	7	49	158	3.2	1	6	49	8.2	1
2026	UCF	1	7	110	15.7	1	0	0	0.0	0
Career		20	123	865	7.0	9	11	109	9.9	2
