= John Bellamy =

John Bellamy may refer to:

- John Bellamy (publisher) (1596–1653), Pilgrim printer of London
- John Dillard Bellamy, Sr, slave owner and builder of the Bellamy Mansion
- John Dillard Bellamy (1854–1942), American congressman, son of the above
- John Haley Bellamy (1836–1914), American folk artist
- John Bellamy (sport shooter), British sport shooter
- John Bellamy, builder contracted to build what is known as Bellamy Road

== See also ==
- John Bellamy Foster (born 1953), editor of Monthly Review and sociologist
