= Beverly A. Gage =

American politician

Beverly A. Gage (died April 1997) was an American politician who represented Salem as a Republican in the New Hampshire House of Representatives. Gage served in the legislature for 23 years, beginning in January 1975. In 1967, she was elected the parliamentarian of Salem's Young Republicans club. In 1983–84, she was chair of the legislative administration committee. She was the Republican majority leader in the legislature as of 1987. Gage died in April 1997.
