= Francis Bellamy (disambiguation) =

Francis Bellamy (1855–1931) was an American Christian minister and author, best known for writing the original version of the U.S. Pledge of Allegiance.

Francis Bellamy is also the name of:

- Francis Bellamy (cricketer) (1909–1969), New Zealand cricketer
- Francis Rufus Bellamy (1886–1972), American author, novelist and editor

== See also ==
- Frank Bellamy (1917–1976), British comics artist
