= Beverley Harper =

Australian author

Beverley Harper (1941 – 9 August 2002) was an Australian author of novels set on the African continent.

Born in Bulli, New South Wales in 1941, Harper visited Africa in 1967. Although she meant to stay for only one year, she lived there until 1988, when she returned to Australia.

Most of her novels were translated into German and published by Bastei Lübbe. Her final novel, Footprints of Lion, was completed by her husband after her death from cancer in 2002. Her ashes lie on the banks of the Boteti River in Botswana.

== Works ==
=== Novels ===
- Harper, Beverley (1996), Storms over Africa, Pan Books, ISBN 978-0-330-35578-0
- — (1997), Edge of the rain, Macmillan, ISBN 978-0-7329-0899-7
- — (1998), Echo of an angry god, Pan Macmillan, ISBN 978-0-7329-0925-3
- — (1999), People of heaven, Pan Macmillan Australia, ISBN 978-0-7329-0982-6
- — (2000), The forgotten sea, Pan Macmillan, ISBN 978-0-7329-1030-3
- — (2001), Jackal's dance, Pan Macmillan, ISBN 978-0-7329-1098-3
- — (2002), Shadows in the grass, Macmillan, ISBN 978-0-7329-1140-9
- — (2004), Footprints of lion, Macmillan, ISBN 978-0-7329-0966-6

=== German translations ===
- Harper, Beverley (2000), Das Gold von Malawi : Roman (1. Aufl ed.), Wunderlich, ISBN 978-3-8052-0665-5
- — (2000), Das Herz von Afrika : Roman, Wunderlich Taschenbuch, ISBN 978-3-499-26234-0
- — (27 May 2004), Sonne über dunklem Land, Bastei Lübbe (published 2004), ISBN 978-3-404-15079-3
- —; Ritterbach, Barbara (12 September 2005), Sturm über verschlungenen Pfaden : Roman, Bastei Lübbe (published 2004), ISBN 978-3-404-15237-7
- — (17 July 2007), Heller Mond in schwarzer Nacht, Bastei Lübbe (published 2005), ISBN 978-3-404-15325-1
- —; Ritterbach, Barbara (8 April 2006), Im letzten Schein der Sterne : Roman, Bastei Lübbe (published 2006), ISBN 978-3-404-15486-9
- — (12 December 2007), Das Flüstern des Windes : Roman (2. Auflage ed.), Bastei Lübbe (published 2007), ISBN 978-3-404-15640-5
- —; Ritterbach, Barbara (2007), Im ersten Glanz der Sonne (1st ed.), Bastei Lübbe, ISBN 978-3-404-15779-2

=== Short stories ===
- "Unclaimed Melody" in Anthology (1994), Summer of Love (1st ed.), Pan Australia, ISBN 978-0-330-35608-4
- "Festival of Lights" in Harding, Traci; Irvine, Ian, 1950-; Harper, Beverley (2000), Mystery, magic, voodoo & the Holy Grail, Voyager, ISBN 978-0-7322-6580-9
- "Who Wins, Dared" in Bacia, Jennifer (2001), Love, obsession, secrets & lies, HarperCollins, ISBN 978-0-7322-7056-8
