= Beverly Penn =

American sculptor (born 1955)

Beverly Penn (born 1955) is an American sculptor who creates sculptures in bronze using imprints of weeds. She was awarded a grant by the Louis Comfort Tiffany Foundation in 2017 and was chosen as a Heavy Metal—Women to Watch in 2018 by the National Museum of Women in the Arts.

== Early life and education ==
Penn was born in Baltimore, Maryland in 1955. As a child, her family paid her a penny for each thistle she dug up from their farm. She received her BFA from the University of Texas at El Paso in 1982. She went on to get her M.A. at New Mexico State University in 1986 and her MFA from SUNY New Paltz in 1989. She currently lives in Austin, Texas.

== Career ==
Penn's first solo exhibition was at the Southwest School of Art in San Antonio, Texas, in 2008. She has also had solo exhibitions at the William Campbell Contemporary Art (2017); the Lux Art Institute (2014); Lisa Sette Gallery (2012); McMurtrey Gallery (2011), and the Grace Museum (2010).

Her work has been in group shows at the National Museum of Women in the Arts (2018), the Flatbed Gallery (2017), Racine Art Museum (2011, 2016), Texas Woman's University (2015), Lawndale Art Center (2014), Wichita Falls Museum of Art (2013), Art Museum of Southeast Texas (2012), and Grand Rapids Art Museum (2011).

Penn is a professor in the department of art and design at Texas State University and her work is currently represented by the Lisa Sette Gallery, Flatbed Press, and the William Campbell Gallery.

== Creative process ==
To explore the tension between nature and culture, Penn gathers weeds and other plants from nature and makes molds of them. Then she pours bronze into the molds and melds the 5-to-6-inch bronze pieces to create her larger sculptures.
