= Daniel Bellamy, the younger =

English writer and divine

Daniel Bellamy, the younger (c. 1715 – 16 February 1788) was an English divine and miscellaneous writer.

Bellamy was the son of Daniel Bellamy, the elder. He was educated at St Paul's School and Trinity College, Cambridge, where he took the degree of Master of Arts (MA) 'per literas regias' in 1759. His first work was the Christian Schoolmaster in 1737. He joined with his father in publishing a collection of Miscellanies in Prose and Verse; the first volume appeared in 1739, and the second in 1740. This collection contained some dramatic pieces, written to be performed by school-girls at breaking- up-time. In Isaac Reed's 'Biographia Dramatica' these little chamber dramas were warmly praised.

Bellamy was minister of Kew and Petersham, and in 1749 was presented to the vicarage of St. Stephen's, near St. Albans. He died on 16 February 1788.

== Works ==
- Christian Schoolmaster, 1737.
- (with Daniel Bellamy the elder) Miscellanies in Prose and Verse, 1739-40.
- Discourses on the Truth of the Christian Religion, 1744.
- A Paraphrase on Job, 1748, 4to.
- On Benevolence, a sermon, with a summary of the life and character of Dean Colet, preached before the gentlemen educated at St. Paul's School, 1756, 4to.
- The British Remembrancer, or Chronicles of the King of England, 1757 ? 12mo.
- Ode to her Royal Highness the Princess Dowager of Wales, 1708? 4to.
- The Family Preacher, 1776, 8vo, discourses for every Sunday throughout the year, written in conjunction with James Carrington, William Webster, and others.
