= Daniel Bellamy, the elder =

English writer

Daniel Bellamy, the elder (born 1687) was an English miscellaneous writer. The son of Daniel Bellamy, scrivener of London, he was born in the parish of St. Alartin's, Ironmonger's Lane, on 25 December 1687. He entered Merchant Taylors' School on 12 March 1702, and matriculated as a commoner of St. John's College, Oxford, on 4 March 1706. In consequence of a reverse of fortune he was forced to leave Oxford without taking a degree in 1709, and became a conveyancer's clerk.

== Works ==
He was the author of:

- The Lord Mornay du Plessis Marly's Thoughts on the Trinity (1721).
- The Cambro-Britannic Engineer; or, The Original mouse-trapp-maker: a mock-heroic-poem in commemoration of St David's Day: [A Translation of the 'Muscipula' of Edward Holdsworth] (1722).
- Love Triumphant; or, The Rival Goddesses: A pastoral opera ... To which are added, some poems and translations never before published (1722).
- The Young Ladies Miscellany; or, Youth's innocent and rational amusement, To which is prefixed, a short essay on the art of pronunciation, and the great advantage arising from an early practice of it in publick (1723; 2nd edition, 1726).
- Moral Tales adapted from Fénelon (1729).
- The Generous Mahometan [a novel] (1730).
- Phædri Fabulæ Selectæ ... Fifty ... Fables of Phædrus, in Latin, French and English (1734).
- The Christian Schoolmaster (1736).

He also began a translation of Bernard Picart's Ceremonies. In some other works he was associated with his son Daniel Bellamy, the younger.
