= Jacques Weber =

French actor, director and writer (born 1949)

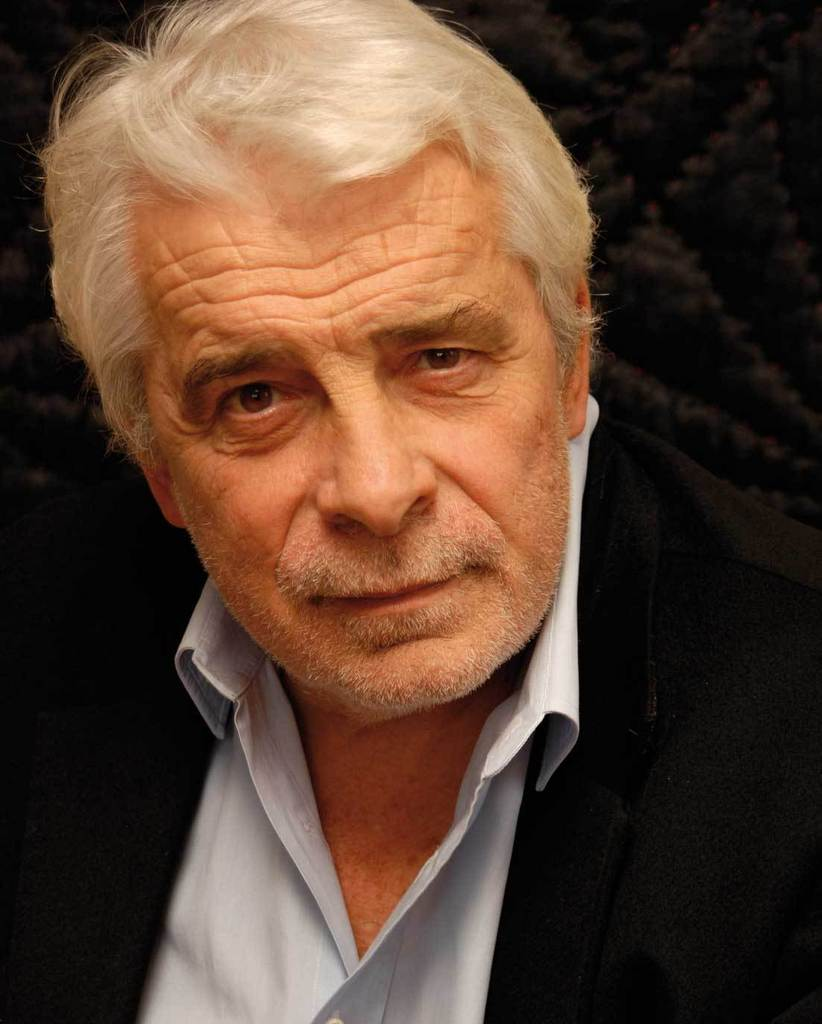
- Jacques Weber in 2012
- Born: 23 August 1949 (age 77); Paris, France
- Occupations: Actor, director, writer
- Years active: 1970–present
- Spouse: Christine Weber
- Children: 3, including Stanley Weber

Jacques Weber (born 23 August 1949) is a French actor, director, and writer.

== Life and career ==
Weber joined the Conservatoire national supérieur d'art dramatique at the age of 20, and won the Prix d'Excellence when he left. He joined Robert Hossein in Rheims, and began a rich theatrical career and a sporadic cinema career.

Marcel Cravenne hired him in 1970 for Tartuffe. In 1972, he was Haroun in Faustine et le Bel Été and played the role of Hugo in État de siège by Costa-Gavras. He was seduced by Claude Jade in Le Malin Plaisir (1975), and by Anicée Alvina in Une femme fatale (1976). The young actor with much sex-appeal (he appeared in Le Malin Plaisir completely naked) was in Bel Ami (1983) after the 1885 novel by Guy de Maupassant in the adaptation by Pierre Cardinal. On television, he was, among others, Le Comte de Monte-Cristo by Denys de La Patellière and Judge Antoine Rives in the show by Gilles Béhat. Noticeable on film as Comte de Guiche in Cyrano de Bergerac (1990) and Don Juan (1998), where he seduces Emmanuelle Béart. In 2008, he joined Isabelle Adjani in a televised adaptation of Figaro which he directed for France 3.

From 1979 to 1985, he appeared at the Centre dramatique national in Lyon (Théâtre du 8th), and from 1986 to 2001, the Théâtre de Nice, Centre dramatique national Nice-Côte d'Azur. He has starred and directed in many of the great roles of classical theatre, including Cyrano, where he excelled for many seasons.

Jacques Weber published Des petits coins de paradis in October 2009, his first work, which relates to his work as an artist and his friends.

In the 2012 presidential election, he endorsed François Hollande. In the 2017 and 2022 presidential elections, he endorsed Jean-Luc Mélenchon.

He is married to Christine Weber and has three children: two sons, Tommy and Stanley, and one daughter, Kim.

== Filmography ==
Year	Title	Role	Director	Notes
1970	Au théâtre ce soir	Albert	Pierre Sabbagh	TV series (1 episode)
1970	Lancelot du lac	Gawain	Claude Santelli	TV movie
1971	Raphael, or The Debauched One		Michel Deville	
1971	Tartuffe	Damis	Marcel Cravenne	TV movie
1972	Mauprat	Bernard	Jacques Trébouta	TV movie
1972	Faustine et le Bel Été	Haroun	Nina Companeez	
1972	L'humeur vagabonde		Édouard Luntz	
1972	State of Siege	Hugo	Costa-Gavras	
1973	R.A.S.	Alain Charpentier	Yves Boisset	
1973	Hilda Muramer	Frédérick von Glauda	Jacques Trébouta (2)	TV movie
1973	Projection privée	Philippe	François Leterrier	
1974	The Woman in Red Boots	Richard	Juan Luis Buñuel	
1975	Malicious Pleasure	Marc Lancelot	Bernard Toublanc-Michel	
1975	Aloïse	The engineer	Liliane de Kermadec	
1975	Une femme fatale	Philippe Mathelin	Jacques Doniol-Valcroze	
1977	Les rebelles	Léon Larguier	Pierre Badel	TV movie
1977	I baroni	Carlo	Giampaolo Lomi	
1977	Le loup blanc	Captain Didier	Jean-Pierre Decourt	TV movie
1977	Un amour de sable	Pierre Gouin	Christian Lara	
1979	Le comte de Monte-Cristo	Edmond Dantes/The Count of Monte-Cristo	Denys de La Patellière	TV Mini-Series (4 episodes)
1979	The Adolescent	Jean	Jeanne Moreau	
1979	Bernard Quesnay	Bernard Quesnay	Jean-François Delassus	TV movie
1981	Le mariage de Figaro	Bartholo	Pierre Badel (2)	TV movie
1981	Les amours de Jacques le fataliste	The Master	Jacques Ordines	TV movie
1983	Les Poneys sauvages	Georges Saval	Robert Mazoyer	TV Mini-Series
1983	Bel ami	Georges Duroy	Pierre Cardinal	TV Mini-Series
1984	Rive droite, rive gauche	Guarrigue	Philippe Labro	
1985	Adolescente, sucre d'amour	Karim	Jocelyn Saab	
1985	Escalier C	Conrad	Jean-Charles Tacchella	
1986	Suivez mon regard	The client	Jean Curtelin	
1986	A Man and a Woman: 20 Years Later	Himself	Claude Lelouch	
1987	Vaines recherches	Claude Schneider	Nicolas Ribowski	TV movie
1988	The Witches' Sabbath	Professor Cadò	Marco Bellocchio	
1989	À deux minutes près	Tristan	Eric Le Hung	
1989	Le crime d'Antoine	Julien	Marc Rivière	
1989	Adieu Christine	Doctor Golstein	Christopher Frank	TV movie
1990	Cyrano de Bergerac	Comte de Guiche	Jean-Paul Rappeneau	César Award for Best Supporting Actor
1990	Haute tension	Lucas	Patrick Dromgoole	TV series (1 episode)
1990	Lacenaire	Jacques Arago	Francis Girod	
1991	Le dernier mot	Serge	Gilles Béhat	TV movie
1993	Antoine Rives, juge du terrorisme	Judge Antoine Rives	Philippe Lefebvre, Gilles Béhat (2)	TV series (6 episodes)
1993	Rupture(s)	The tramp	Christine Citti	
1994	Le misanthrope		Mathias Ledoux	TV movie
1994	Aventures dans le Grand Nord	Pierre	Arnaud Sélignac	TV series (1 episode)
1995	Le petit garçon	The father	Pierre Granier-Deferre	
1995	The Horseman on the Roof	Narrator	Jean-Paul Rappeneau (2)	
1996	Beaumarchais	Duke of Chaulnes	Édouard Molinaro	
1996	Chienne de vie	Daniel	Bernard Uzan	TV movie
1996	Papa est un mirage	Philippe	Didier Grousset	TV movie
1996	La femme de la forêt	Lucas	Arnaud Sélignac (2)	TV Mini-Series
1998	Don Juan	Don Juan	Jacques Weber	
1998	Que la lumière soit	Professor Lang	Arthur Joffé	
1999	Tôt ou tard	Pierre	Anne-Marie Etienne	
2000	Bérénice	Antiochus	Jean-Daniel Verhaeghe	TV movie
2001	L'affaire Kergalen	Jean Laguennec	Laurent Jaoui	TV movie
2001	Tel père, telle flic	Commissioner Nordey	Eric Woreth	TV series
2001	Mausolée pour une garce	Henri Taride	Arnaud Sélignac (3)	TV movie
2002	Ruy Blas	Don César de Bazan	Jacques Weber (2)	TV movie
2002	La panne	The husband	Frédéric Cerulli	Short
2003	7 ans de mariage	Claude	Didier Bourdon	
2004	Plan B		Eric Gendarme	Short
2006	Le poids du silence		David Benmussa	Short
2006	Les aristos	Count Charles Valéran	Charlotte de Turckheim	
2006	Les ambitieux	Saint-Clair	Catherine Corsini	
2006	Odette Toulemonde	Olaf Pims	Éric-Emmanuel Schmitt	
2007	La lance de la destinée	Jacques Beranger	Dennis Berry	TV Mini-Series
2008	Figaro	Count Almaviva	Jacques Weber (3)	TV movie
2008	Intrusions	André de Saché	Emmanuel Bourdieu	
2008	Les héritières	Ottavio Della Rocca	Harry Cleven	TV movie
2009	All About Actresses	Himself	Maïwenn	
2009	Fais-moi plaisir!	Elisabeth's father	Emmanuel Mouret	
2009	Folie douce	Claude Monceau	Josée Dayan	TV movie
2010	Ensemble, c'est trop	Roger	Léa Fazer	
2010	HH, Hitler à Hollywood	Himself	Frédéric Sojcher	
2011	Joseph l'insoumis	Joseph Wresinski	Caroline Glorion	TV movie
2011	Le grand restaurant II	A client	Gérard Pullicino	TV movie
2011	Mystère au Moulin Rouge	Harold Meyer	Stéphane Kappes	TV movie
2012	Sur la piste du Marsupilami	Daddy Dan	Alain Chabat	
2012	Arrête de pleurer Pénélope	Aimé Badaroux	Juliette Arnaud, Corinne Puget	
2012	Bienvenue parmi nous	Max	Jean Becker	
2012	Bad Girl	Professor Lecoq	Patrick Mille	
2013	Un prince (presque) charmant	Charles Lavantin	Philippe Lellouche	
2013	Le grand retournement	The banker Weber	Gérard Mordillat	
2013	Désolée pour hier soir	Marc	Hortense Gelinet	Short
2014	Les Yeux jaunes des crocodiles	Marcel Grobz	Cécile Telerman	
2015	Quand je ne dors pas		Tommy Weber	
2015	Le passager	Jean-Pierre Toinin	Jérôme Cornuau	TV Mini-Series
2015	Les Bêtises	André	Rose and Alice Philippon	
2016	Death in Sarajevo			
2017	La Mante	Charles Carrot	Alexandre Laurent	Netflix Original Series
2021	In Therapy	Alain	Emmanuel Finkiel	
2022	The Origin of Evil (L'Origine du mal)	Serge	Sébastien Marnier	

== Theatre ==
- 1969 : Tchao by Marc-Gilbert Sauvajon, directed by Jacques-Henri Duval, Théâtre Saint-Georges

=== 1970–1979 ===
- 1971 : La Convention de Belzébir by Marcel Aymé, directed by René Dupuy
- 1971 : Crime et Châtiment by Fyodor Dostoyevsky, directed by Robert Hossein, Reims
- 1972 : Les Bas-fonds by Maxime Gorki, directed by Robert Hossein, Reims, Théâtre de l'Odéon
- 1973 : Jean-Baptiste Poquelin directed by Jacques Weber
- 1973 : Les Fourberies de Scapin by Molière, directed by Jacques Weber
- 1975 : Crime et Châtiment by Fyodor Dostoyevsky, directed by Robert Hossein, Théâtre de Paris
- 1976 : Le Neveu de Rameau by Denis Diderot, directed by Jacques Weber
- 1977 : La Putain respectueuse by Jean-Paul Sartre, directed by Jacques Weber, Théâtre Gérard Philipe
- 1977 : Le Nouveau Monde by Villiers de l'Isle-Adam, directed by Jean-Louis Barrault
- 1977 : Arrête ton cinéma by Gérard Oury, directed by the author, Théâtre du Gymnase
- 1978 : Maître Puntila et son valet Matti by Bertolt Brecht, directed by Guy Rétoré, Théâtre de l'Est Parisien
- 1979 : The Taming of the Shrew by William Shakespeare, directed by Jacques Weber

=== 1980–1989 ===
- 1980 : Le Mariage de Figaro by Beaumarchais, directed by Françoise Petit and Maurice Vaudaux, Théâtre de Paris
- 1980 : Les Amours de Jacques le Fataliste by Denis Diderot, directed by Francis Huster
- 1980 : Deux heures sans savoir, directed by Jacques Weber
- 1980 : Spartacus by Bernard-Joseph Saurin, directed by Jacques Weber
- 1982 : Une journée particulière after the film by Ettore Scola, directed by Françoise Petit, Théâtre du 8^{e} Lyon
- 1983 : Le Rêve de d'Alembert by Denis Diderot, directed by Jacques Kraemer
- 1983 : Cyrano de Bergerac by Edmond Rostand, directed by Jérôme Savary, Théâtre Mogador
- 1985 : Deux sur la balançoire by William Gibson, directed by Bernard Murat
- 1985 : À vif directed by Jacques Weber
- 1987 : Monte Cristo after Alexandre Dumas, directed by Jacques Weber, Grande Halle de la Villette
- 1987 : Dom Juan by Molière, directed by Francis Huster, Théâtre Renaud-Barrault
- 1988 : Nocturnes after Stefan Zweig, directed by Jacques Weber, Serge Marzolff
- 1988 : Le Misanthrope by Molière, directed by Jacques Weber
- 1988 : Le Chant du départ by Ivane Daoudi, directed by Jean-Pierre Vincent

=== 1990–1999 ===
- 1991 : Seul en scène, directed by Jacques Weber
- 1991 : Maman Sabouleux and 29 degrés à l'ombre by Eugène Labiche, directed by Isabelle Nanty
- 1991 : L'École des femmes by Molière, directed by Jean-Luc Boutté, Théâtre Hébertot, Théâtre des Célestins
- 1992 : Mystification mix of texts by Denis Diderot, directed by Jacques Weber
- 1993 : La Mégère apprivoisée by William Shakespeare, directed by Jérôme Savary
- 1995 : Le Tartuffe by Molière, directed by Jacques Weber, Théâtre de Nice
- 1996 : La Tour de Nesle by Roger Planchon after Alexandre Dumas, directed by Roger Planchon, Théâtre de Nice, TNP Villeurbanne
- 1996 : Gustave et Eugène after Gustave Flaubert, directed by Jacques Weber, Arnaud Bédouet
- 1997 : La Tour de Nesle by Roger Planchon after Alexandre Dumas, directed by Roger Planchon, Théâtre Mogador
- 1998 : Une journée particulière after the film by Ettore Scola, directed by Jacques Weber, Théâtre de Nice, Théâtre de la Porte-Saint-Martin
- 1999 : La Controverse de Valladolid by Jean-Claude Carrière, directed by Jacques Lassalle, Théâtre de l'Atelier

=== 2000–2009 ===
- 2000 : La Vie de Galilée by Bertolt Brecht, directed by Jacques Lassalle, Théâtre national de la Colline
- 2002 : Phèdre by Jean Racine, directed by Jacques Weber, Théâtre Déjazet
- 2002 : Le Limier, by Anthony Shaffer, directed by Didier Long, Théâtre de la Madeleine
- 2003 : Jacques Weber raconte... Monsieur Molière ! after Mikhaïl Boulgakov
- 2004 : L'Évangile selon Pilate by Éric-Emmanuel Schmitt, directed by Christophe Lidon, Théâtre Montparnasse
- 2004 : Seul en scène, Théâtre de la Gaîté-Montparnasse
- 2004 : Ondine by Jean Giraudoux, directed by Théâtre Antoine (with Laetitia Casta and Vytas Kraujelis)
- 2006 : Cyrano, adapted by Christine Weber, directed by André Serre, Théâtre de la Gaîté-Montparnasse
- 2006 : Love letters by Albert Ramsdell Gurney, directed by Sandrine Dumas
- 2007–2008 : Débats 1974–1981, after the televised debates between Valéry Giscard d'Estaing and François Mitterrand for the Presidential elections of 1974 and 1981, directed by Jean-Marie Duprez, Théâtre de la Madeleine
- 2008 : Sacré nom de dieu by Arnaud Bédouet after the correspondence of Gustave Flaubert, directed by Loïc Corbery, Théâtre de la Gaîté-Montparnasse
- 2009 : César, Fanny, Marius after Marcel Pagnol, adapted and directed by Francis Huster, Théâtre Antoine
- 2009 : Seul en scène, Théâtre Marigny

== Audiobooks ==
- 2004 : Le Joueur d'échecs, by Stefan Zweig, Éditions Thélème, Paris, 2005 ISBN 978-2-87862-293-5

== Honours ==
- Chevalier of the ordre national du Mérite
- 1992 : Officer of the ordre des Arts et des Lettres
- 1996 : Chevalier of the Légion d'honneur, promoted to officer on 2008

== Awards and nominations ==
- 1991 : César Award for Best Supporting Actor at the 16th Awards, for Cyrano de Bergerac
