= Observation tower =

Tall structure for long-distance viewing

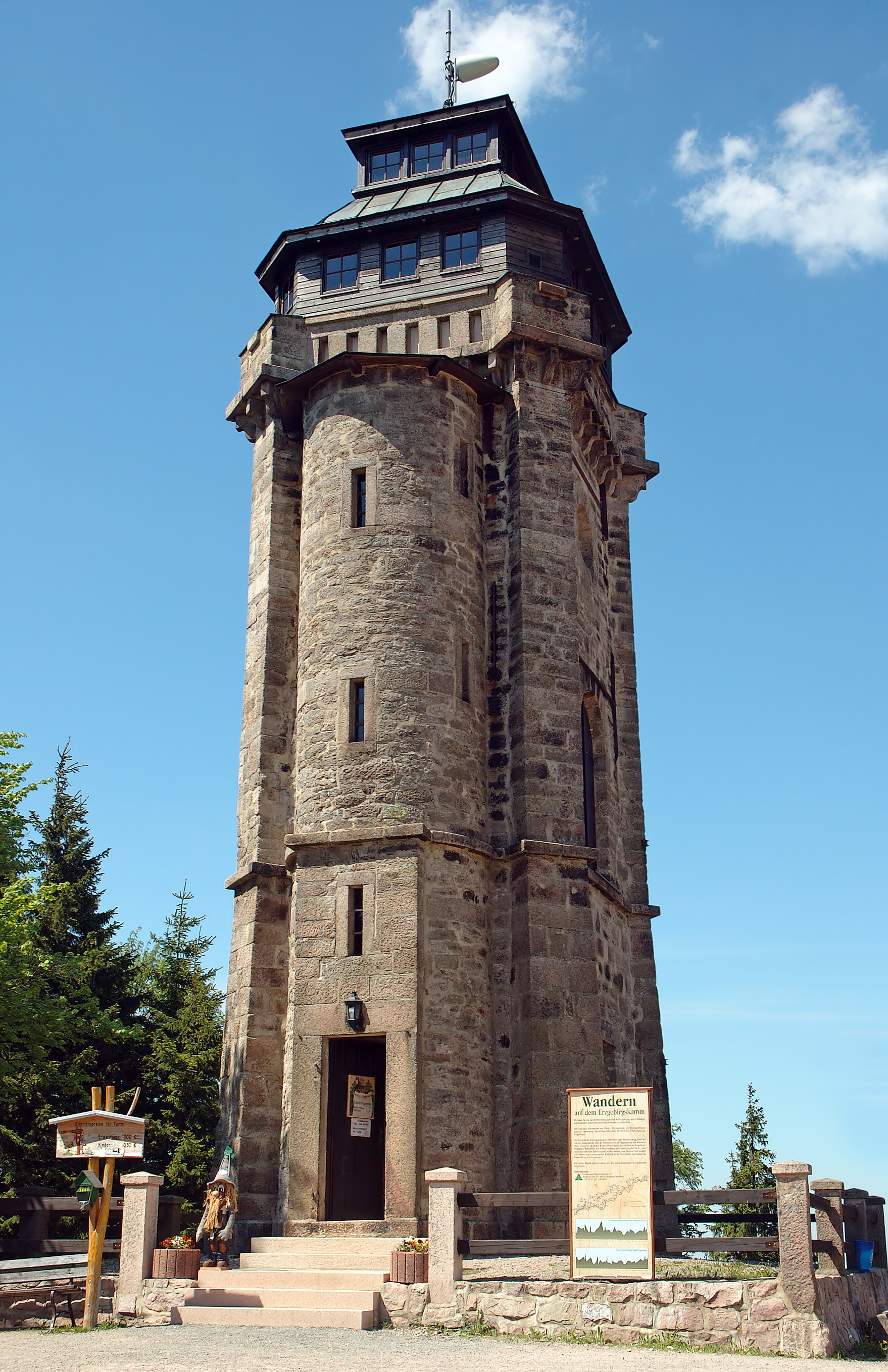
Observation tower on the Auersberg, Saxony, Germany

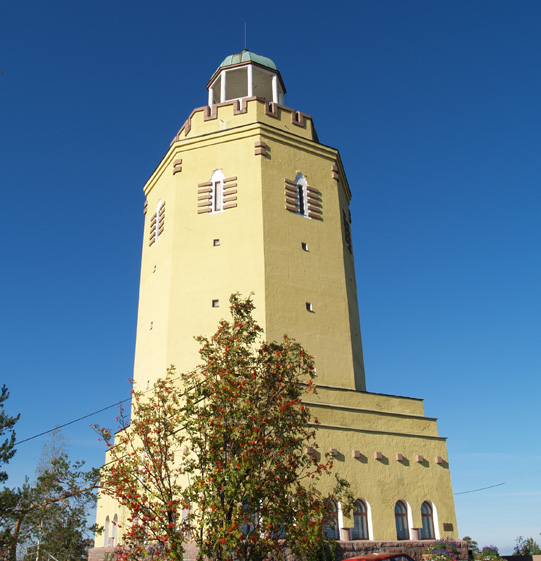
Haukkavuori's observation tower in Kotka, Kymenlaakso, Finland

An observation tower is a tower built wholly or partly to provide an elevated vantage point from which people can look out over the surrounding landscape or cityscape, usually through an unobstructed 360-degree field of view. Unlike a watchtower, which is occupied for surveillance or fire detection over an extended period, a dedicated observation tower exists principally so that visitors may enjoy or study a panoramic view. Observation towers are typically at least 20 metres (66 ft) tall, so that they clear the surrounding tree canopy or built environment, and have historically been constructed in stone, brick, timber and iron; reinforced concrete, structural steel and glued laminated timber predominate in modern examples.

Because a tall structure is expensive to build and maintain for viewing alone, observation functions are very often combined with another use. Many of the world's best-known observation towers are also broadcasting towers, and observation decks are routinely incorporated into water towers, church steeples, lighthouses, high-rise buildings and even the pylons of bridges. Admission fees and tower restaurants help to offset construction and running costs, and in many cities the tower has become a landmark and a symbol of civic identity.

Structures closely related to the observation tower include the crow's nest, the belvedere, the viewing platform, the observation deck, the gyro tower and the observation wheel.

== Terminology ==
The English term observation tower covers a broad family of structures, and usage overlaps with several near-synonyms. In German-speaking Europe, where the type is especially common, a purpose-built viewing tower is an Aussichtsturm, distinguished from the Wachturm (watchtower) and the Fernsehturm (television tower). A belvedere—from the Italian for "beautiful view"—is generally an architectural pavilion or gallery placed to command a prospect rather than a free-standing shaft, while a folly tower or prospect tower is an ornamental structure on a landscaped estate built at least partly for effect.

A tower is usually described as an observation tower only where public or semi-public access to a viewing level is intended. Where the elevated position exists for an operational purpose—air traffic control towers, fire lookouts, prison and border guard towers, lifeguard towers—the structure is more precisely a watchtower or lookout, even though the two categories frequently exchange members: decommissioned fire lookouts are often reopened as public viewpoints, and some public towers are pressed into service as lookouts during periods of high fire risk.

== Construction and usage ==
Observation towers are conspicuous features of the landscape, since they must rise above trees, terrain and neighbouring buildings to deliver a clear view. Siting is therefore as important as height: a modest timber tower on a summit or ridge may command a far wider prospect than a much taller structure in a valley or dense urban district.

=== Structural forms ===
Four structural systems account for the great majority of observation towers:

- Masonry towers — the traditional form of the 18th- and 19th-century prospect tower, built of quarried stone or brick with a solid or cavity wall and an internal spiral stair. Masonry towers are durable and require little maintenance but are heavy, slow to build and practically limited in height.
- Lattice and framed towers — open frameworks of wrought iron, steel or, increasingly, timber. Lattice construction offers a high strength-to-weight ratio, transparency to wind and comparatively low material cost. The Eiffel Tower (1889) is the archetype; a distinct sub-family is the hyperboloid structure, pioneered by Vladimir Shukhov, in which straight members arranged as a doubly ruled surface produce a curved, highly efficient shell.
- Reinforced concrete shafts — the standard solution for tall post-war broadcasting and observation towers. A slipform-cast hollow shaft carries lifts, stairs and services, with a cantilevered "turret" or "pod" housing decks, restaurants and antenna galleries. Concrete supplies the mass and stiffness needed to limit sway and to support heavy antenna loads.
- Timber towers — historically common for cheap rural lookouts and now enjoying a revival through glued laminated timber and cross-laminated timber. The tower on the Pyramidenkogel in Carinthia, Austria, completed in 2013, reaches 100 metres (330 ft) to the tip of its antenna; its operators describe it as the tallest timber viewing tower in the world, and its structure consists of sixteen elliptically arranged larch glulam columns braced by steel diagonals.

=== Engineering considerations ===
Slender towers are governed less by gravity loads than by lateral loads and by human comfort. Wind is the dominant design case: designers must resist both the mean drag force and dynamic effects such as vortex shedding, which can excite crosswind oscillations in a lightly damped shaft. Countermeasures include aerodynamic shaping, helical strakes, open lattice work and tuned mass dampers; the 634-metre (2,080 ft) Tokyo Skytree additionally employs a central concrete core linked to the outer steel frame in a vibration-control system inspired by the shimbashira of traditional Japanese pagodas. In seismic regions, ductile detailing and base isolation are used to accommodate ground motion. Perceptible sway at the top of a tall tower is normal and is limited by comfort criteria rather than strength: occupants can typically detect accelerations well below any level that threatens the structure.

Other recurring design problems include lightning protection, ice accretion and the risk of ice falling from high decks and antennas, condensation and cleaning of glazing, evacuation from great heights with limited stair capacity, and the reliability of lifts, which are usually the only practicable means of access above about 60 metres (200 ft).

=== Access and amenities ===
Access to a viewing level may be by stair, lift, or both. Purpose-built rural towers are almost always climbed on foot; broadcasting towers and high-rise decks rely on high-speed lifts, often with a stair retained solely for emergency escape. Some towers have turned the climb itself into an attraction—the CN Tower's internal stairway of 2,579 steps is used for charity climbs—while others offer novel descents, such as the 51-metre (167 ft) slide at the Pyramidenkogel.

Viewing levels may be open-air platforms, glazed galleries, or a combination. Open platforms are preferred by photographers because there are no reflections or dirty glazing to shoot through, whereas enclosed galleries are more comfortable in wind, cold or rain and permit year-round operation. Later additions to the repertoire include glass floors, cantilevered skywalks, external walkways with harness systems, and abseil or bungee attractions. Restaurants are common at larger towers and are sometimes built as revolving restaurants, a form popularised from the late 1950s onward.

Access arrangements vary widely. Small rural towers are often permanently open and free of charge; municipal and association-owned towers may open only at weekends or in season; and commercially operated decks on broadcasting towers and skyscrapers charge an admission fee and keep fixed hours. Ticket revenue can be substantial and, at broadcasting towers, is frequently used to subsidise the upkeep of transmission infrastructure.

== Types ==
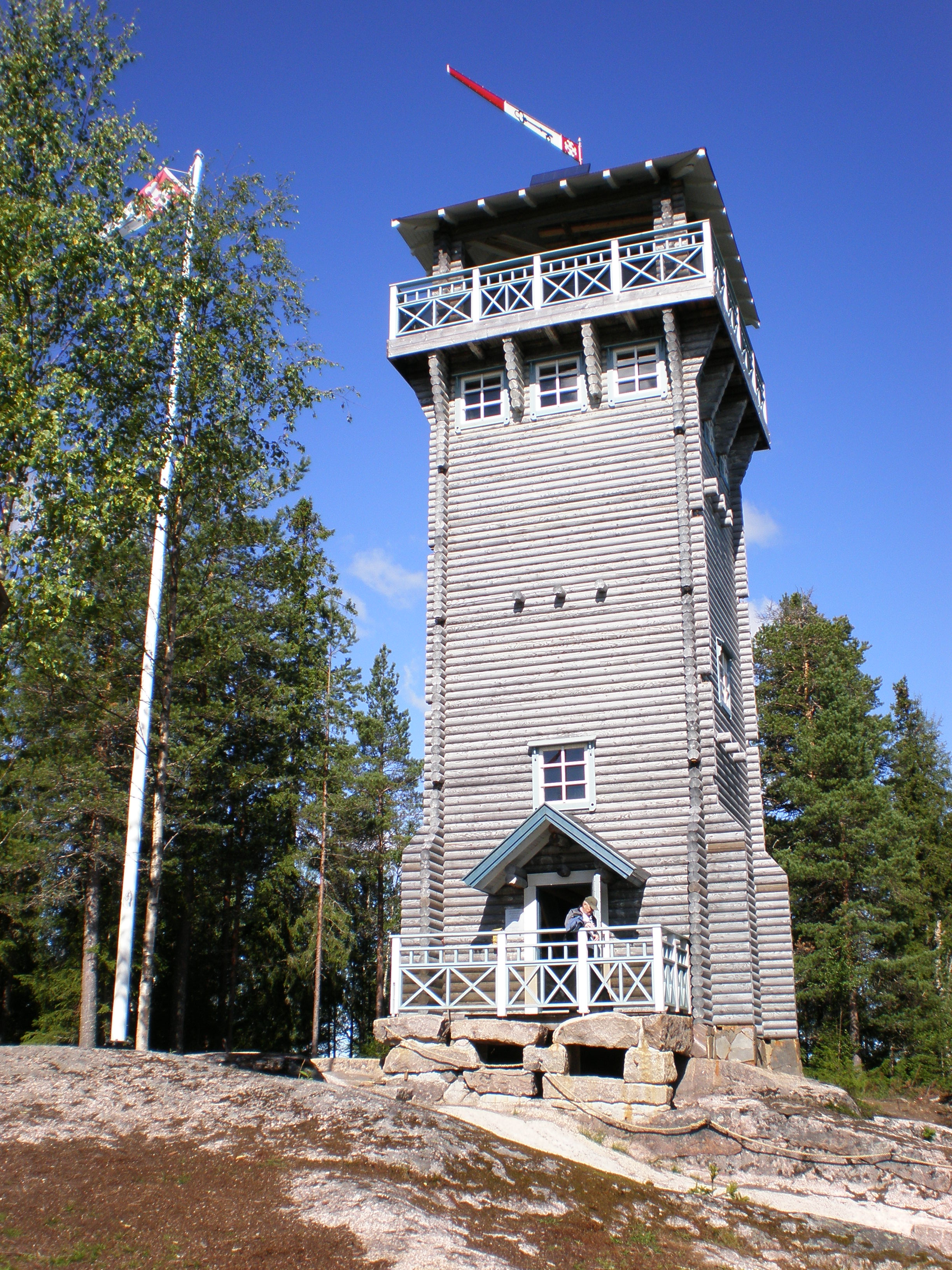
Kirkkovuori nature observation tower, Karstula, Central Finland

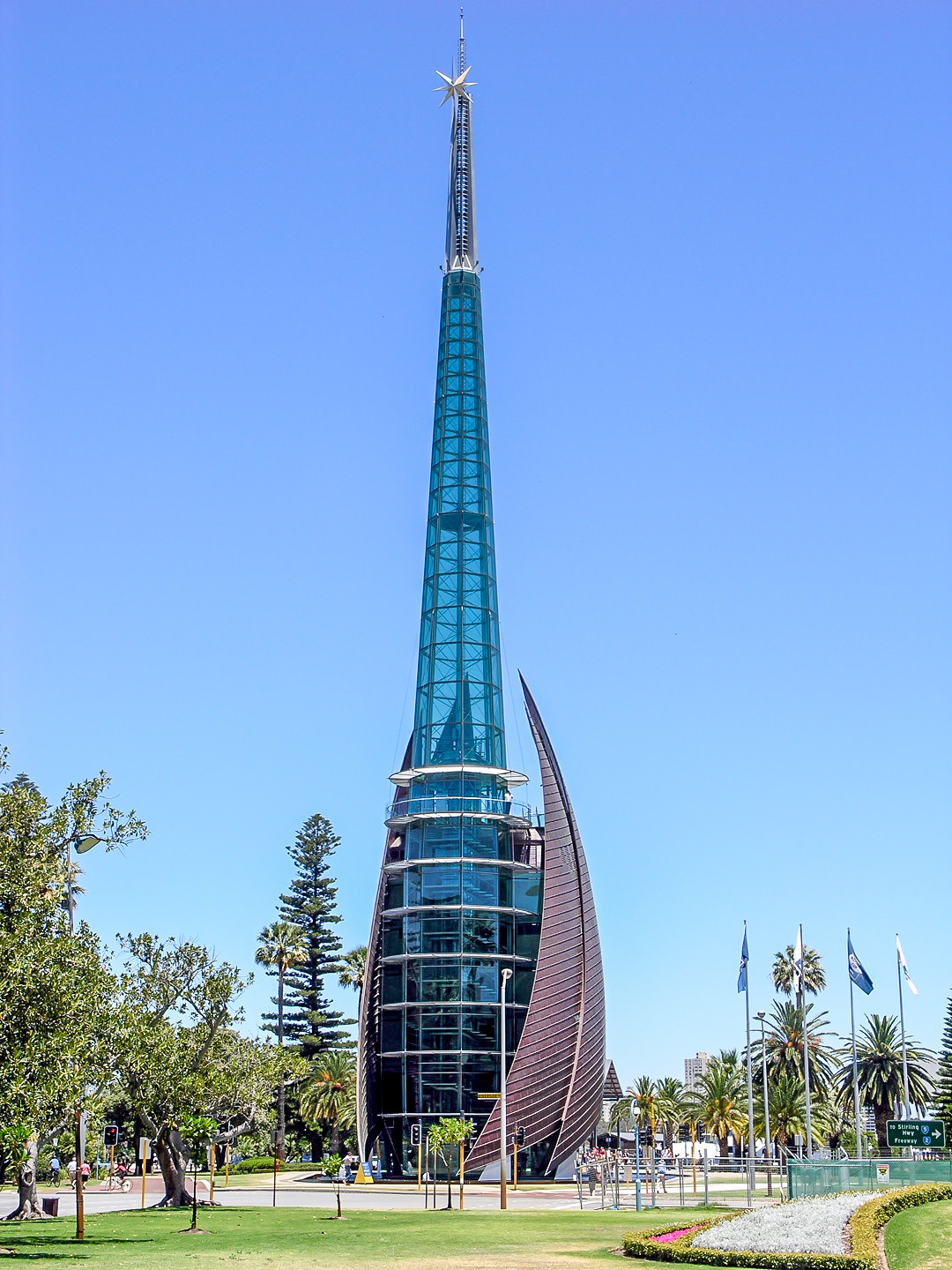
Swan Bells observation tower, Perth, Australia

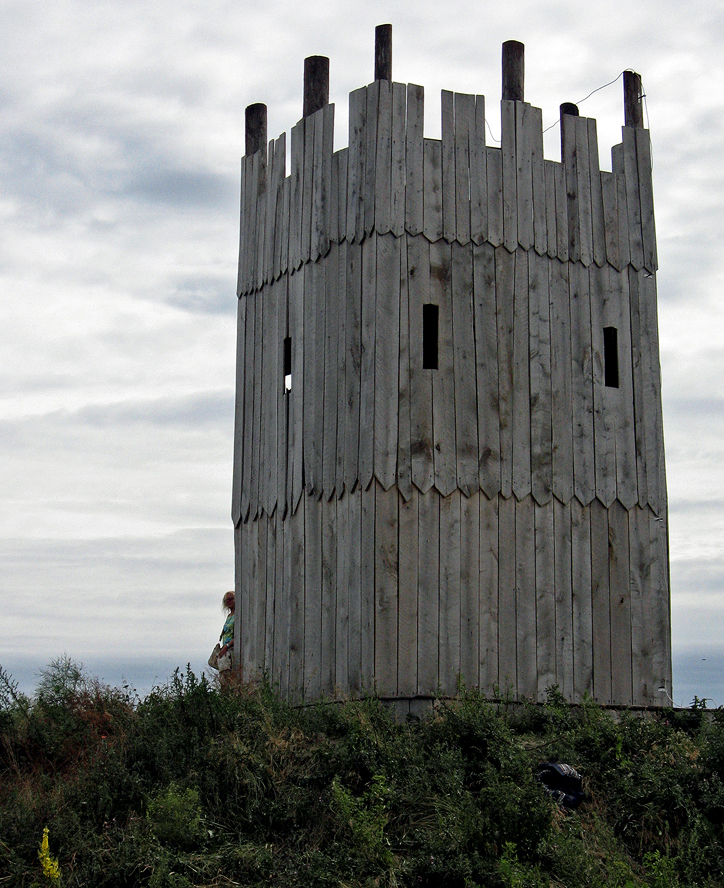
Observation tower at Fotevikens Museum, Sweden, 2007

=== Dedicated observation towers ===
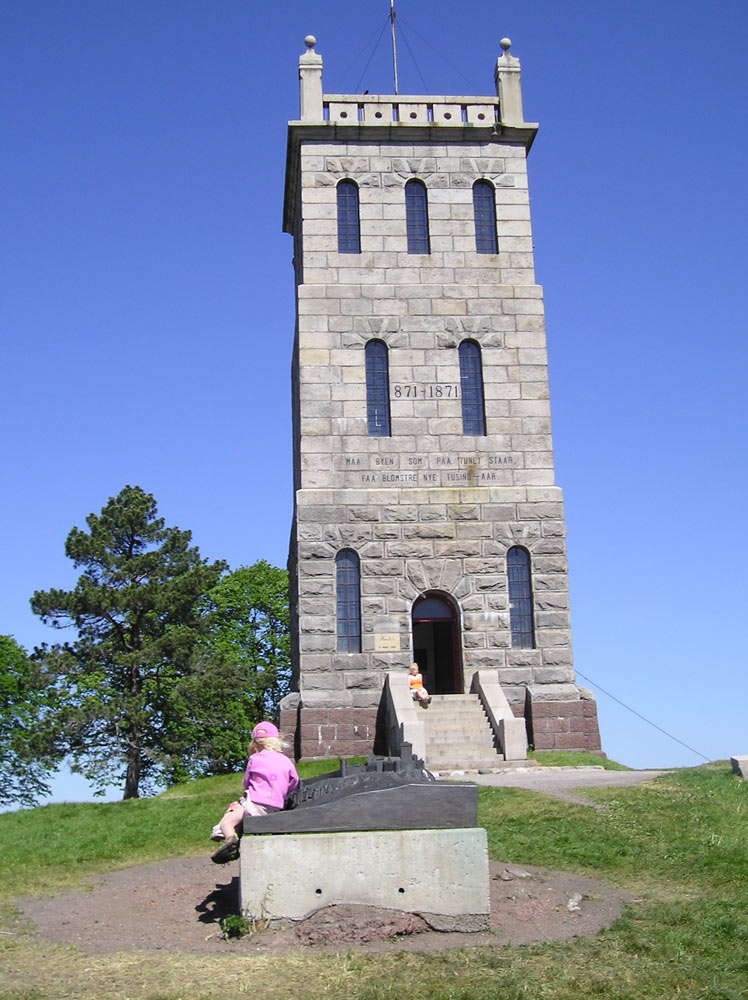
Slottsfjellet observation tower, Tønsberg, Norway

Particularly in the decades before World War I, rambling and alpine associations, beautification societies and municipalities built observation towers on large numbers of summits and hilltops across central Europe. Most were of stone, though timber and iron were also used, and access to the platform—typically between 5 and 40 metres (16 and 131 ft) above ground—was almost always by stair. Many such towers remain in the ownership of the clubs that built them and are maintained by volunteers.

Although tourism was the primary purpose, secondary uses were common. Towers were pressed into service as fire lookouts in dry seasons and as military observation posts, sometimes with anti-aircraft positions alongside, in wartime. Today a number carry antennas for emergency-service radio, mobile telephony or low-power FM and television transmitters. A flagpole at the summit is a characteristic feature of older examples.

Some of these towers are permanently accessible, either free or on payment of an admission fee; others open only at set times. The platform is usually open to the air, and a café or inn at the base is frequent. A few have far more extensive accommodation: the tower on the Rossberg near Reutlingen in Germany incorporates a hotel within its structure.

Construction of purpose-built viewing towers did not stop in 1914, and new examples continue to appear, often as attractions at horticultural shows and regional garden festivals, as landmarks for nature reserves and country parks, and as elements of landscape art programmes. Brick has largely given way to concrete, steel and engineered timber, and contemporary designs are frequently the outcome of architectural competitions; several have won major design awards, among them the 23.5-metre timber hyperboloid tower at Hemer in Germany, built for a regional garden show.

Permanent observation towers are occasionally found in amusement parks, though in parks with a single all-inclusive admission charge, ride-based panorama towers and observation wheels are generally preferred because they move visitors through in a fixed cycle.

=== Watchtowers ===
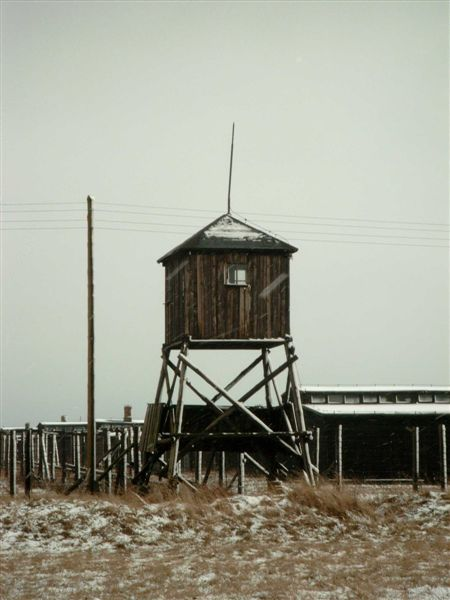
Guard tower at Majdanek concentration camp, Poland

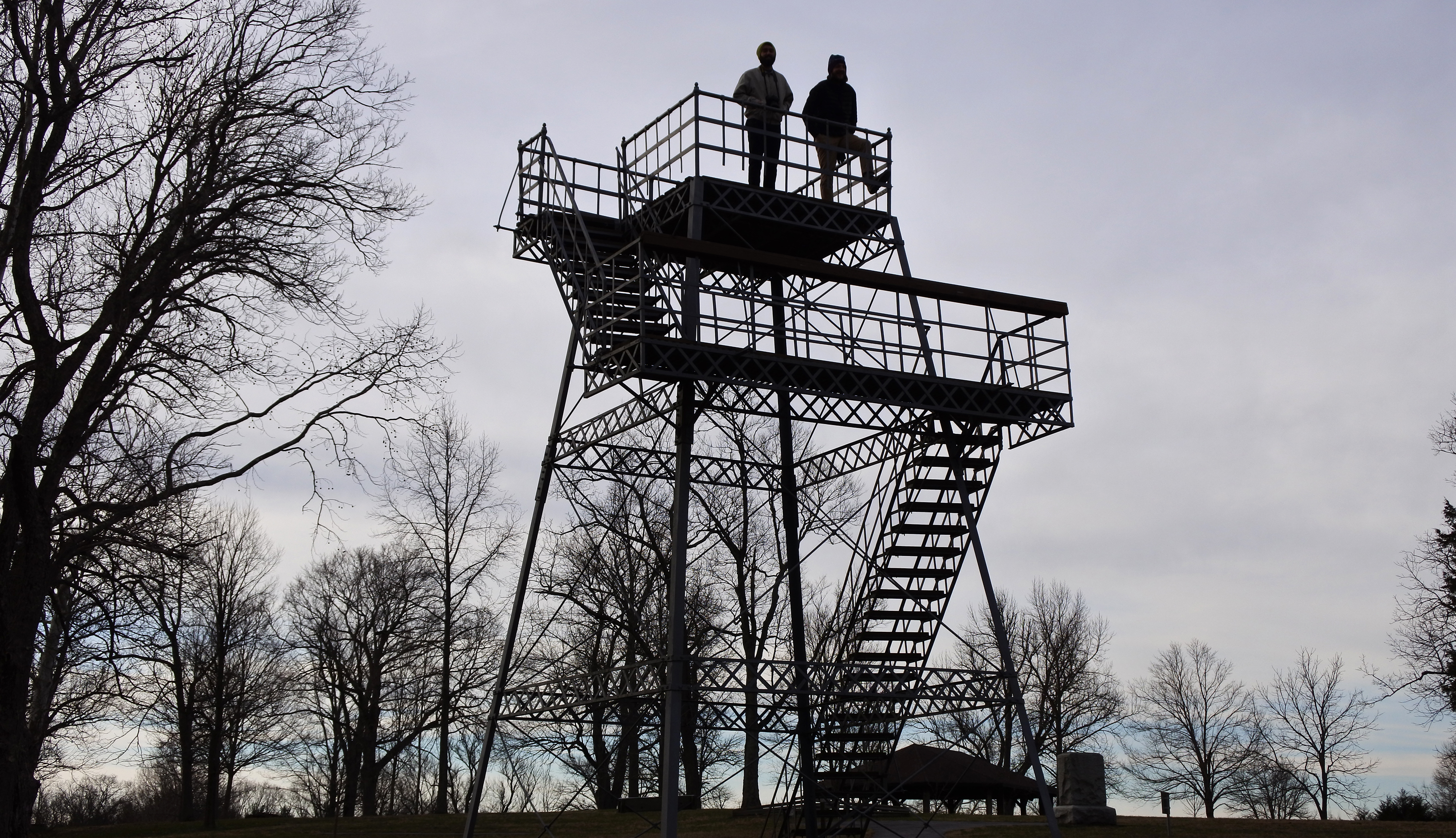
Observation tower at Serpent Mound, Ohio, United States

Watchtowers are observation towers from which a person supervises an area. Strictly speaking control towers belong to this category, although at airports much of the surveillance is now carried out by radar and other non-optical means. Watchtowers usually have an enclosed cabin to protect the observer from the weather, and because they are seldom more than about 20 metres (66 ft) tall they rarely have a lift. Active watchtowers are not generally open to the public, since they monitor sensitive areas; however, some fire watchtowers include a public platform, or are opened to visitors outside the fire season. Decommissioned watchtowers are readily converted into observation towers, and many former border, prison and military towers have been preserved as viewpoints or as memorials.

=== Radio and television towers ===
Some radio towers are designed so that, in addition to carrying transmitting equipment, they can be used as observation towers. This requires a structure stable enough to permit continuous safe public access without interrupting transmission. It is readily achieved for UHF and VHF services, whose antennas sit at the top of an earthed structure, but not for most long-wave and medium-wave installations, in which the mast itself radiates and is electrically live.

The difficulty is illustrated by the Berlin Radio Tower, which originally carried a medium-wave T-antenna together with an 80-metre mast and stood on insulators. Early test transmissions showed that voltages at the tower would be hazardous to visitors, and the tower was therefore earthed through its lift shaft—at the cost of directing the main beam away from the intended service area, the city of Berlin. Since almost all pre-war broadcasting used the long-, medium- and short-wave bands, towers acting purely as antenna supports only became widespread after World War II with the introduction of VHF and UHF services; it was these that were routinely given observation decks, most often using closed reinforced-concrete construction.

Such towers usually serve television transmission or microwave relay links and are accordingly called television towers or telecommunication towers. Visitors reach the deck by lift, since it commonly lies between 50 and 200 metres (160 and 660 ft) above ground and in some cases considerably higher. Many have a tower restaurant, sometimes revolving. Restaurants are enclosed for the comfort of diners, while the viewing gallery may be open or glazed. Decks are open only at fixed times and normally require an admission fee.

The observation deck of the Canton Tower in Guangzhou, China, at 488 metres (1,601 ft), is among the highest on any tower, and that of the Tokyo Skytree stands at 451 metres (1,480 ft).

=== High-rise buildings ===
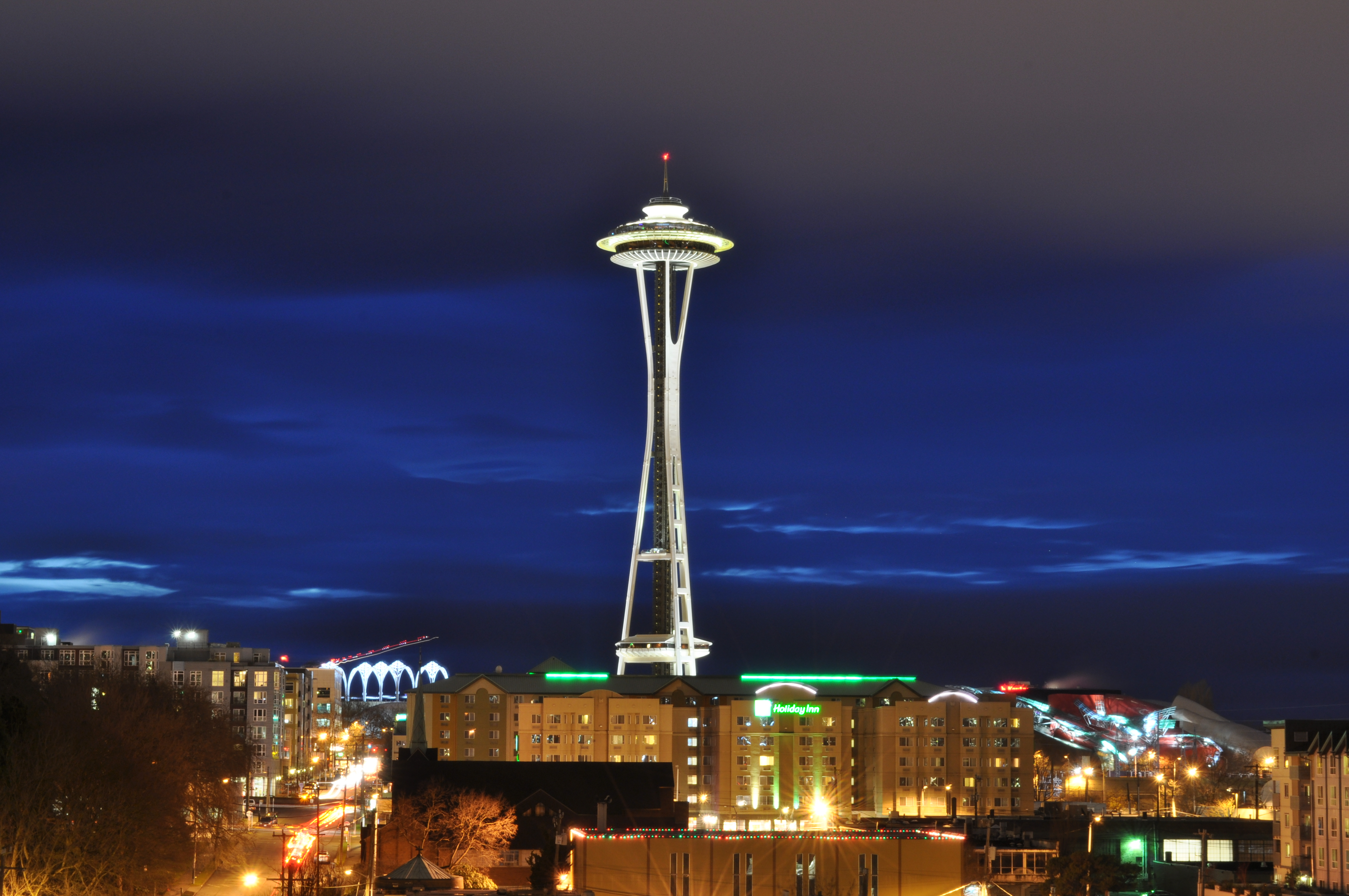
The Space Needle, an observation tower in Seattle, United States

Numerous high-rise buildings incorporate observation decks, sometimes with an accompanying restaurant or bar. These are most often on or near the topmost occupied floor and may be glazed or open-air. Access is normally by lift, at set opening hours and on payment of an admission fee. Skyscraper decks now hold most of the world altitude records, with the highest public viewing levels at the Burj Khalifa in Dubai, the Shanghai Tower and the Ping An Finance Centre all above 550 metres (1,800 ft). Historically, observation decks were an important part of the public appeal of early skyscrapers such as the Singer Building and the Empire State Building, and they remain significant revenue generators for their owners.

=== Water towers ===
Many water towers carry an observation deck open to the public, usually open-air and at a height comparable to that of older purpose-built towers—commonly between 10 and 50 metres (33 and 164 ft). Access may be by stair or lift depending on the tower, and a few have a tower restaurant. Because the tank must in any case be elevated and the supporting structure is often architecturally treated, adding a public gallery is comparatively inexpensive. Decommissioned water towers are frequently converted wholly to viewing and event use.

=== Church towers ===
Some church towers and cathedral spires possess observation galleries; lifts are rare, and the ascent is usually by a narrow spiral stair. Entry to the gallery, unlike entry to the church itself, generally requires a fee and is limited to the church's opening hours. Galleries are typically between 20 and 50 metres (66 and 164 ft) above ground and are almost always open to the air. Well-known examples include the towers of Cologne Cathedral, St Stephen's Cathedral in Vienna and St Paul's Cathedral in London, whose galleries have drawn sightseers for centuries.

=== Lighthouses ===
Some lighthouses have a gallery open to the public, reached by stair. An admission fee is often charged and hours may be limited by staffing or by weather. Lighthouse galleries are usually between 10 and 50 metres (33 and 164 ft) above ground and almost always open-air. Automation has left many lighthouses without resident keepers, and heritage trusts and local authorities have converted a number into visitor attractions, museums or holiday accommodation with public access to the lantern gallery.

=== Sports facilities ===
Several sports venues include tall structures with observation decks. This is frequently the case at ski jumps, which have an inrun tower that is unused in summer, and at stadiums: the inclined tower of the Olympic Stadium in Montreal, at 165 metres (541 ft), is claimed to be the tallest inclined tower in the world and carries a funicular to a viewing level. Access is generally during opening hours on payment of a fee, by lift, stair or both, and platforms may be glazed or open. Heights are usually between 10 and 50 metres (33 and 164 ft), though stadium and ski-jump towers may be considerably higher.

=== Fire lookout towers ===
Fire lookout towers have been used widely in Australia, Canada and the United States to raise lookouts to a height from which new wildfires can be spotted and located. Detection was traditionally carried out with an Osborne Fire Finder, an alidade mounted on a circular map that allows the observer to read off a bearing to a smoke column; cross-bearings from two towers fix the fire's position.

Construction in the United States accelerated after the catastrophic fires of the early 20th century and reached its peak in the 1930s, when the Civilian Conservation Corps built roughly 600 lookouts; by the 1950s there were more than 5,000 permanent lookout towers, most of them in the timber-rich West. The standardised L-4 cab, a 14-by-14-foot glazed cabin set either on a low base or atop a timber or steel tower of up to 84 feet (26 m), became the most widely used pattern in the western states.

Aerial patrols, satellite detection, lightning-strike mapping and, more recently, networks of automated cameras with computer vision smoke detection have displaced most staffed lookouts, and the number of active lookouts has fallen from thousands to hundreds. Many surviving towers have been adopted by preservation groups such as the Forest Fire Lookout Association, listed on heritage registers, or let as rental cabins, while others have been lost to decay, vandalism, wildfire and deliberate removal. The lookout also acquired a place in American literature through the Beat Generation writers Gary Snyder, Philip Whalen and Jack Kerouac, all of whom worked seasons on lookouts in the North Cascades.

=== Bird observation towers ===
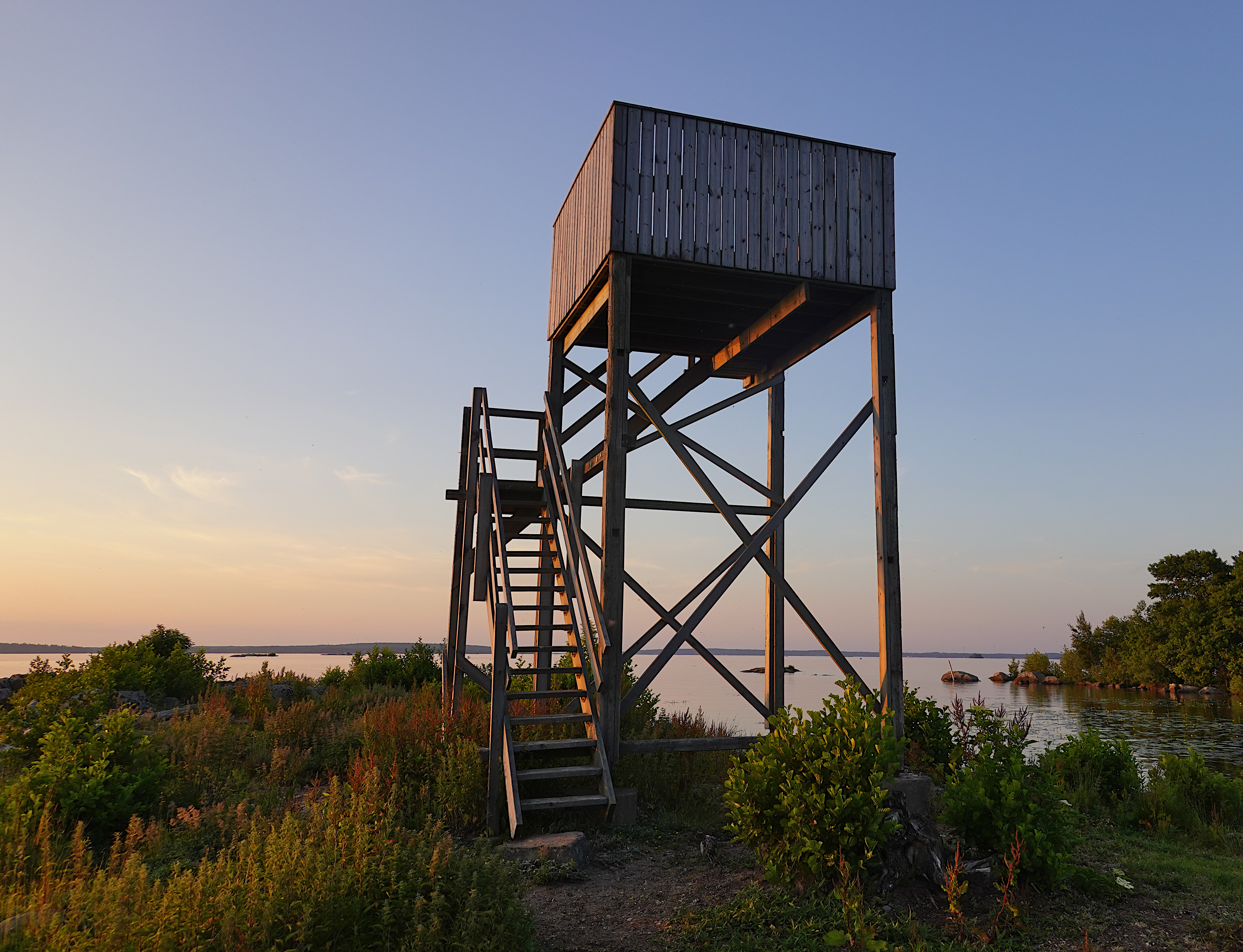
Timber observation tower in Gamla Ekuddens nature reserve, Lake Vänern, Sweden

Wetlands, estuaries, lagoons and migration bottlenecks where birdlife congregates are often equipped with bird observation towers. Raising observers above reedbeds and scrub extends the field of view across open water and marsh while keeping people at a distance that minimises disturbance. Such towers are usually simple timber structures with an enclosed or partly screened upper deck, fitted with viewing slots, bench seating and identification boards, and they complement ground-level bird hides. They are a standard feature of nature reserves in the Nordic countries, the Netherlands, Germany and the United Kingdom, and are frequently funded by conservation organisations or by ecotourism initiatives. Comparable towers are used for general wildlife watching—over game reserves, seal colonies and wetlands—and for forest canopy research.

=== Hyperboloid structures ===
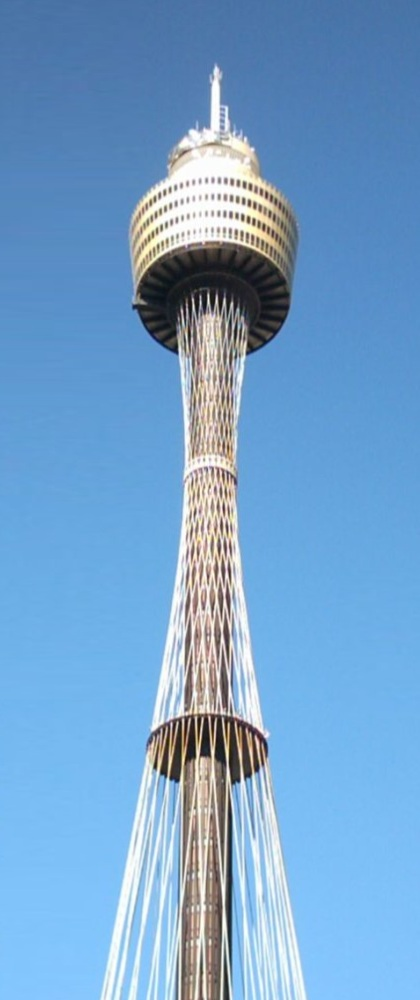
Sydney Tower, a hyperboloid structure

Hyperboloid structures take the form of a hyperboloid of one sheet, a doubly ruled surface that can be built entirely from straight members, usually as a lattice tower, with an observation deck at the top. The form was patented by the Russian engineer Vladimir Shukhov in 1899 after his prototype tower at the Nizhny Novgorod exhibition of 1896, and it combines high stiffness against wind with economical, repetitive fabrication. Later examples range from Shukhov's own Shabolovka radio tower in Moscow to the Canton Tower in Guangzhou and the timber lattice towers of contemporary garden festivals.

=== Other towers ===
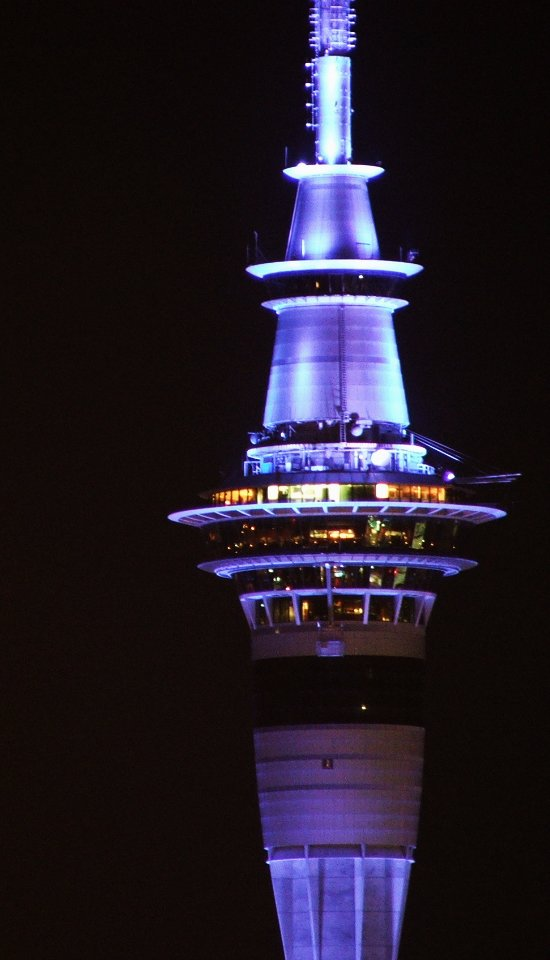
The Sky Tower in Auckland, New Zealand

A number of observation towers fit none of the categories above. Examples include the Henninger Turm, a grain silo in Frankfurt that carried a restaurant and viewing deck; the bell tower of the Berlin Olympic Stadium, whose platform is served by a lift; the winding tower of the mining museum in Bochum, with an open-air deck reached by lift; and a wind turbine in the Holtriem wind farm in Germany fitted with an enclosed platform reached by stairs. Aerial tramway support towers have been built to double as observation towers and stations, as at the Torre Jaume I in Barcelona. Observation decks have been installed on the pylons of suspension bridges—for example Nový Most in Bratislava—and even on an electricity pylon: such an installation existed from 1977 to 2010 on a strainer pylon near Hürth, Germany. Among the most unusual is the Pont basculant de la Seyne-sur-Mer in France, a former bascule bridge permanently raised and reused as an observation tower.

== History ==
=== Antiquity and the medieval period ===
Elevated vantage points are as old as fortification. Ziggurats in Mesopotamia, the Pharos of Alexandria, Roman watchtowers along frontier lines such as the limes, Chinese beacon towers along the Great Wall, and the coastal watchtowers of the medieval Mediterranean were all built to see further than an observer on the ground. These were functional military and navigational structures rather than tourist attractions, but they established the constructional repertoire—stone shafts, internal stairs, parapeted platforms—on which later viewing towers drew. Medieval town belfries and cathedral spires served both as lookouts against fire and attack and, incidentally, as the first structures many citizens ever climbed for a view.

=== Prospect towers and the picturesque ===
The observation tower as a building type for pleasure emerged in Europe in the 18th century, in the context of the English landscape garden and the aesthetic of the Picturesque. Landowners erected prospect towers, follies and belvederes to terminate a vista, to survey their estates and to provide a destination for a walk. Such towers were often historicist in style—mock ruins, Gothic keeps, classical temples—and their purpose was as much scenic composition as observation.

=== Germany, Austria and Switzerland ===
In Germany, observation towers began to appear in the countryside at the end of the 18th century, typically built by wealthy aristocrats. Only from the middle of the 19th century did citizens' associations take over the construction of such towers, a shift that accompanied the growth of organised hiking, the Romantic appreciation of landscape and the expansion of the railway network, which brought day-trippers within reach of upland scenery. In Austria and Switzerland many towers were established by alpine and tourist associations and are still cared for by them, while in the wooded uplands of Germany local beautification committees were especially active. Because of the long reign of Emperor Franz Joseph, numerous platforms in the Habsburg lands were named "jubilee" viewing towers. A distinctively German variant was the Bismarck tower: more than 200 were completed by the 1930s in honour of Chancellor Otto von Bismarck, many of them incorporating a viewing platform as well as a fire basin, and combining nationalist commemoration with public amenity.

The Belvedere on the Pfingstberg in Potsdam, built for Frederick William IV of Prussia between 1847 and 1863 to designs by Ludwig Persius, Ludwig Ferdinand Hesse and Friedrich August Stüler, illustrates the royal end of the tradition: an Italianate twin-towered belvedere, built expressly for the view over Potsdam and the Havel lakes, and now part of the Palaces and Parks of Potsdam and Berlin World Heritage Site.

The invention of the safety elevator in the second half of the 19th century made much taller viewing levels practical, and the Eiffel Tower (1889) and Blackpool Tower (1894) date from this era. Radio towers combining transmission and observation functions developed in Berlin between 1924 and 1926. After World War II a strong demand for tall towers arose from their dual use as television and radio transmitters; in large cities there was a wish to provide these with a restaurant and observation deck so that admission fees and civic prestige would make the investment more economical. Several water towers were built with the same intention, though many have since been demolished.

=== United Kingdom ===
Britain contributed both the folly tradition—prospect towers such as Broadway Tower in Worcestershire (1798)—and, later, the seaside pleasure tower. Blackpool Tower, opened in 1894 and inspired directly by the Eiffel Tower, coupled a viewing platform at 158 metres (518 ft) with a ballroom, circus and aquarium at its base, a template followed by short-lived rivals at New Brighton and Morecambe. Monumental columns with internal stairs, notably the Monument to the Great Fire of London (1677), had already been serving Londoners as viewpoints for two centuries.

=== United States ===
Observation towers in the United States developed along three main lines: commercial towers at expositions and resorts, commemorative towers on battlefields and at memorials, and utilitarian fire lookouts.

The earliest prominent commercial example was the Latting Observatory, a 315-foot (96 m) iron-braced timber tower erected beside the New York Crystal Palace for the 1853 Exhibition of the Industry of All Nations. With landings at 125, 225 and 300 feet fitted with telescopes, it was the tallest structure in New York City until it was shortened in the mid-1850s, and it burned down in 1856. A contemporary account in the Engineering News later described it as the "New York 'Eiffel' Tower of 1853". Later expositions continued the theme, and resort towers proliferated at seaside and mountain destinations.

Battlefield preservation produced a distinctive American genre of commemorative observation towers. The War Department, which administered the principal Civil War battlefields before the creation of the National Park Service, erected five steel observation towers at Gettysburg so that visitors and army officers could study the ground as a whole; three survive, including the 60-foot (18 m) Culp's Hill tower completed by the Gettysburg Battlefield Commission in 1896. A comparable limestone tower rising nearly 60 feet (18 m) was completed at Antietam in 1897.

In the 20th century, American observation towers became fixtures of world's fairs and civic renewal projects. The Space Needle, built for the Century 21 Exposition in Seattle in 1962, was among the most influential, and its saucer-topped silhouette was widely imitated. Later examples include the Reunion Tower in Dallas (1978) and the Stratosphere Tower in Las Vegas (1996), while skyscraper observatories—at the Empire State Building, the Willis Tower and One World Trade Center—remain the country's most visited high-level viewpoints.

=== Post-war towers and the modern era ===
The post-war decades produced the classic concrete television-and-observation tower, of which the Stuttgart TV Tower (1956) was the prototype: it demonstrated that a slender slipformed concrete shaft could carry both antennas and a public turret, and it was quickly emulated across Europe and beyond in structures such as the Fernsehturm Berlin (1969), the Ostankino Tower in Moscow (1967) and the CN Tower in Toronto (1976), which held the record for the world's tallest free-standing structure for 32 years.

Since the 1990s the centre of gravity has shifted to Asia and the Middle East, with the Oriental Pearl Tower (1994), the Macau Tower (2001), the Canton Tower (2010) and the Tokyo Skytree (2012), the tallest tower in the world at 634 metres (2,080 ft). At the same time, the highest public viewing levels have migrated from dedicated towers to supertall buildings, and towers have responded by adding experiential attractions—glass floors, edge walks, skyjumps and immersive media—rather than height alone. In parallel, a countervailing movement has produced a generation of small, architecturally ambitious timber and steel towers for parks, nature reserves and garden festivals, in which the structure itself is the attraction.

== Economics, tourism and cultural role ==
Large observation towers are usually justified on mixed grounds. Broadcasting towers earn revenue from transmission leases, while their decks and restaurants generate visitor income that helps to fund maintenance and periodic refurbishment of the whole structure. For municipalities, a tower can act as a city landmark and marketing symbol; several—the Eiffel Tower, the Space Needle, the CN Tower, the Tokyo Skytree—have become metonyms for their cities and appear widely on official emblems, souvenirs and skyline imagery.

Visitor numbers at leading towers run to millions a year, and the observation business has developed its own conventions: timed-entry ticketing, dynamic pricing, souvenir photography, combination tickets with other attractions, and event hire of decks and restaurants. Towers are also focal points for public spectacle, including New Year firework displays, illumination schemes and colour-lighting campaigns marking causes and anniversaries.

Small rural towers operate on a very different basis. Many are free to enter and are maintained by hiking clubs, parish councils or forestry authorities, with costs met from membership subscriptions, donations, grant schemes and volunteer labour. Their economic contribution is indirect, through walking tourism and the trade it brings to nearby villages.

== Safety, regulation and conservation ==
Public towers are subject to building regulations covering guarding heights and infill (to prevent falls and climbing by children), stair geometry, lift safety, fire escape and structural inspection. Where a tower carries transmitting antennas, exposure limits for radio-frequency radiation restrict public access to certain levels and may require transmission to be reduced or shut down during maintenance. Suicide prevention is a recognised issue at prominent high decks, and operators commonly fit high mesh screens, inward-curving barriers, surveillance and crisis signage. Falling ice, high winds and lightning frequently cause temporary closures of exposed decks.

Ageing towers present conservation problems of their own. Iron and steel lattice towers require repeated repainting and the replacement of corroded members; concrete shafts suffer carbonation and reinforcement corrosion; timber towers are vulnerable to rot at connections and ground contact. Historic towers are often protected as listed buildings or scheduled monuments, which constrains alterations such as the addition of lifts or glazing needed to meet modern accessibility and safety expectations. Where repair is uneconomic, towers may be closed, dismantled or, in the case of many fire lookouts, deliberately removed—prompting active preservation campaigns by heritage and enthusiast organisations.

== See also ==
- Belvedere (structure)
- Bird hide
- Deck (building)
- Dubai Creek Tower – proposed guy-wire observation tower
- Gyro tower
- List of tallest towers
- List of towers
- Observation car
- Observation deck
- Observation wheel
- Panorama
- Skywalk (aerial)
- Watchtower

== General and cited references ==
- Kleinmanns, Joachim (1999). Schau ins Land. Aussichtstürme. Marburg: Jonas-Verlag. ISBN 3-89445-252-8.
- Kruft, Hanno-Walter (1994). A History of Architectural Theory: From Vitruvius to the Present. New York: Princeton Architectural Press. ISBN 978-1-56898-010-2.
- Kohlmaier, Georg; von Sartory, Barna (1986). Houses of Glass: A Nineteenth-Century Building Type. Translated by Harvey, John C. Cambridge, Massachusetts: MIT Press. ISBN 978-0-262-11108-9. LCCN 85015556.
