= Pierre Moustiers =

French writer

- Born: Pierre Rossi; 13 August 1924; La Seyne-sur-Mer, France
- Died: 6 June 2016 (aged 91)
- Occupations: Novelist; Essayist; Screenwriter

Pierre Moustiers (13 August 1924 – 6 June 2016) is the pen name of French writer Pierre Rossi.

== Biography ==
Under his pseudonym, he was successively laureate of the 1969 Grand prix du roman de l'Académie française, the 1972 Prix Maison de la Presse, the 1977 Prix des libraires, the 1997 Grand Prix d'Histoire Chateaubriand and the 2003 Prix du roman historique. He wrote the screenplay for the 1983 French miniseries Bel Ami; an adaptation of the 1885 novel of the same name by Guy de Maupassant.

Between 1973 and 2011, he wrote several scripts for films destined to French television.

== Work ==
=== Under his pseudonym ===
- 1957: Le Journal d'un geôlier. Mauvaise graine ou graine de violence. Paris: Éditions Denoël. p. 207.
- 1962: La Mort du pantin. collection Blanche. Paris: Éditions Gallimard. p. 232. ISBN 9782070246588.
- 1962: L'Irak des révoltes. Paris: Éditions du Seuil. p. 325.
- 1962: Le Pharisien. Paris: Éditions Gallimard. 1962. p. 210. ISBN 9782070246595.
- 1969: La Paroi. collection Blanche. Paris: Éditions Gallimard. 1972. p. 188. ISBN 978-2070361588., Grand prix du roman de l'Académie française 1969
- 1971: L'Hiver d'un gentilhomme. Paris: Éditions Gallimard. December 1975. p. 276. ISBN 978-2-07-036705-4., Prix Maison de la Presse 1972
- 1973: Hervé Bazin ou le romancier en mouvement. Paris: Le Seuil. 1973. p. 252. ISBN 9782020020251.
- 1974: Une place forte. collection Blanche. Paris: Éditions Gallimard. 1974. p. 216. ISBN 978-2070291014.
- 1976: Un crime de notre temps. Paris: Le Seuil. 1976. p. 192. ISBN 978-2020044929., Prix des libraires 1977
- 1978: Prima Donna. Cadre rouge. Paris: Le Seuil. 1978. p. 188. ISBN 978-2020049511.
- 1984: La Grenade. Paris: Albin Michel. 1984. p. 239. ISBN 978-2226019882.
- 1986: Un aristocrate à la lanterne. Collection Blanche. Paris: Éditions Gallimard. 1986. p. 243. ISBN 978-2070707201.
- 1990: L'Éclat. collection Blanche. Paris: Éditions Gallimard. p. 217. ISBN 978-2070717675.
- 1991: Un si bel orage. Paris: Albin Michel. 1991. p. 249. ISBN 978-2226054197.
- 1993: La Flambée. Paris: Albin Michel. 1993. p. 204. ISBN 978-2226064745.
- 1995: L'Or du torrent. Paris: Éditions Grasset and Fasquelle. 1995. p. 176. ISBN 978-2246506010.
- 1997: À l'abri du monde. Paris: Albin Michel. 1997. p. 362. ISBN 978-2226093028., Grand Prix d'Histoire Chateaubriand 1997
- 2000: Saskia. Paris: Albin Michel. 1999. p. 206. ISBN 978-2226107046.
- 2000: Ce fils unique. Paris: Albin Michel. 2000. p. 201. ISBN 978-2226115652.
- 2001: De rêve et de glace. Paris: Albin Michel. 2001. p. 185. ISBN 978-2226127907.
- 2003: Le Dernier Mot d'un roi. Paris: Albin Michel. 2003. p. 250. ISBN 978-2226137722.
- 2005: Demain, dès l'aube. Paris: Albin Micel. 2005. p. 180. ISBN 978-2226156792.
- 2006: L'avenir ne s'oublie pas. Paris: Albin Michel. 2006. p. 257. ISBN 978-2226172426.
- 2008: Baptiste. Paris: Éditions de Fallois. 2008. p. 197. ISBN 978-2877066471.

=== Under his name ===
- 1964: Rossi, Pierre; Edelstein (photos), Simon. Libye. L'atlas Des Voyages. Lausanne, Switzerland: Éditions Rencontre. p. 192.
- 1967: La Tunisie de Bourguiba. Tunis, Tunisia.
- 1971: Rossi, Pierre (1971). Un soir à Pise. Paris: Éditions Flammarion. ISBN 978-2080605511.
- 1970: Rossi, Pierre. Les Clefs de la guerre. Bibliothèque arabe. Paris: Jérôme Martineau Éditeur. p. 150.
- 1976: La Cité d’Isis – Histoire vraie des Arabes, Nouvelles éditions latines
- 1979: La Verte Libye de Quadhafi. Paris: Éditions Hachette Réalités. 1979. p. 263. ISBN 978-2010068560.
- 1987: Rossi, Pierre (1987). Les Conjurés d'Aléria. Paris: La Table Ronde. pp. 215. ISBN 978-2710303060.
- 1987: Rossi, Pierre (1987). Les Hauts-Lieux de prière et de guérison en France. Enseignement spirituel. Paris: Éditions Courrier du Livre. p. 223. ISBN 978-2702901854.
