= La Seyne-sur-Mer =

La Seyne-sur-Mer La Sanha (Occitan)
- Commune
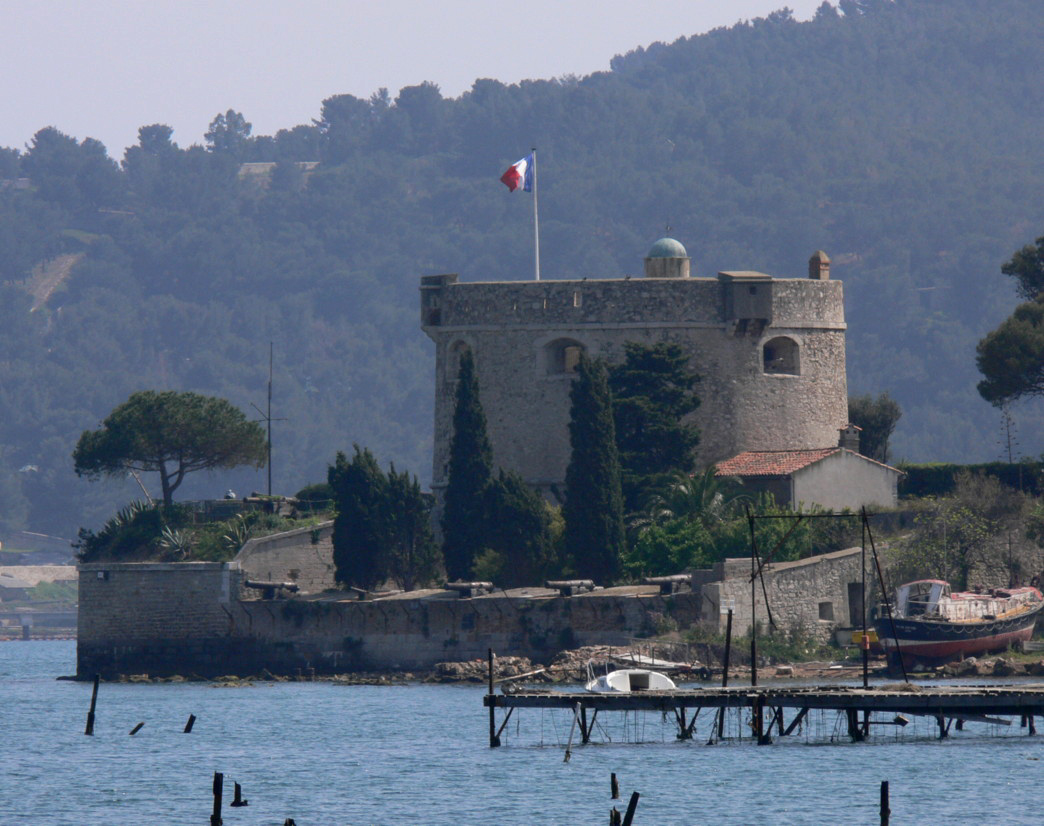
- Fort Balaguier

- Coat of arms
- Location of La Seyne-sur-Mer
- Location within France Location within Provence-Alpes-Côte d'Azur
- Coordinates: 43°06′00″N 5°52′59″E
- Country: France
- Region: Provence-Alpes-Côte d'Azur
- Department: Var
- Arrondissement: Toulon
- Canton: La Seyne-sur-Mer-1 and 2
- Intercommunality: Métropole Toulon Provence Méditerranée

Government
  - Mayor (2020–2026): Nathalie Bicais (LR)
- Area^{1}: 22.17 km^{2} (8.56 sq mi)
- Elevation: 9 m (30 ft)
- Highest elevation: 352 m (1,155 ft)
- Lowest elevation: 0 m (0 ft)
- Population (2023): 63,732
  - Density: 2,875/km^{2} (7,445/sq mi)
- Time zone: UTC+01:00 (CET)
  - Summer (DST): UTC+02:00 (CEST)
- INSEE/Postal code: 83126 /83500
- ^{1} French Land Register data, which excludes lakes, ponds, glaciers > 1 km^{2} (0.386 sq mi or 247 acres) and river estuaries.

La Seyne-sur-Mer (French pronunciation: [la sɛjn(ə) syʁ mɛʁ]; lit. "La Seyne on Sea"; Occitan: La Sanha), commonly simply La Seyne, is a commune in the Var department in the Provence-Alpes-Côte d'Azur region in Southeastern France. La Seyne-sur-Mer, which is part of the agglomeration of Toulon, is situated adjacent to the west of the city.

== Demographics ==
The population data in the table and graph below refer to the commune of La Seyne-sur-Mer proper, in its geography at the given years. The commune ceded territory to the new commune of Saint-Mandrier-sur-Mer in 1950.

Historical population

Year	Pop.	±% p.a.
1793	3,980	—
1800	4,895	+3.00%
1806	4,826	−0.24%
1821	5,605	+1.00%
1831	6,732	+1.85%
1836	6,344	−1.18%
1841	7,099	+2.27%
1846	6,497	−1.76%
1851	7,401	+2.64%
1856	8,709	+3.31%
1861	11,700	+6.08%
1866	11,192	−0.88%
1872	10,123	−1.66%
1876	10,655	+1.29%
1881	12,072	+2.53%
1886	13,166	+1.75%
1891	14,332	+1.71%
1896	16,341	+2.66%
1901	21,002	+5.15%

Year	Pop.	±% p.a.
1906	19,747	−1.22%
1911	22,093	+2.27%
1921	23,168	+0.48%
1926	24,678	+1.27%
1931	26,817	+1.68%
1936	27,073	+0.19%
1946	26,172	−0.34%
1954	26,672	+0.24%
1962	33,570	+2.92%
1968	43,783	+4.53%
1975	51,155	+2.25%
1982	57,659	+1.72%
1990	59,968	+0.49%
1999	60,188	+0.04%
2007	58,252	−0.41%
2012	63,902	+1.87%
2017	63,936	+0.01%
2023	63,732	−0.05%

Source: EHESS and INSEE (1968-2023)

== Economy ==
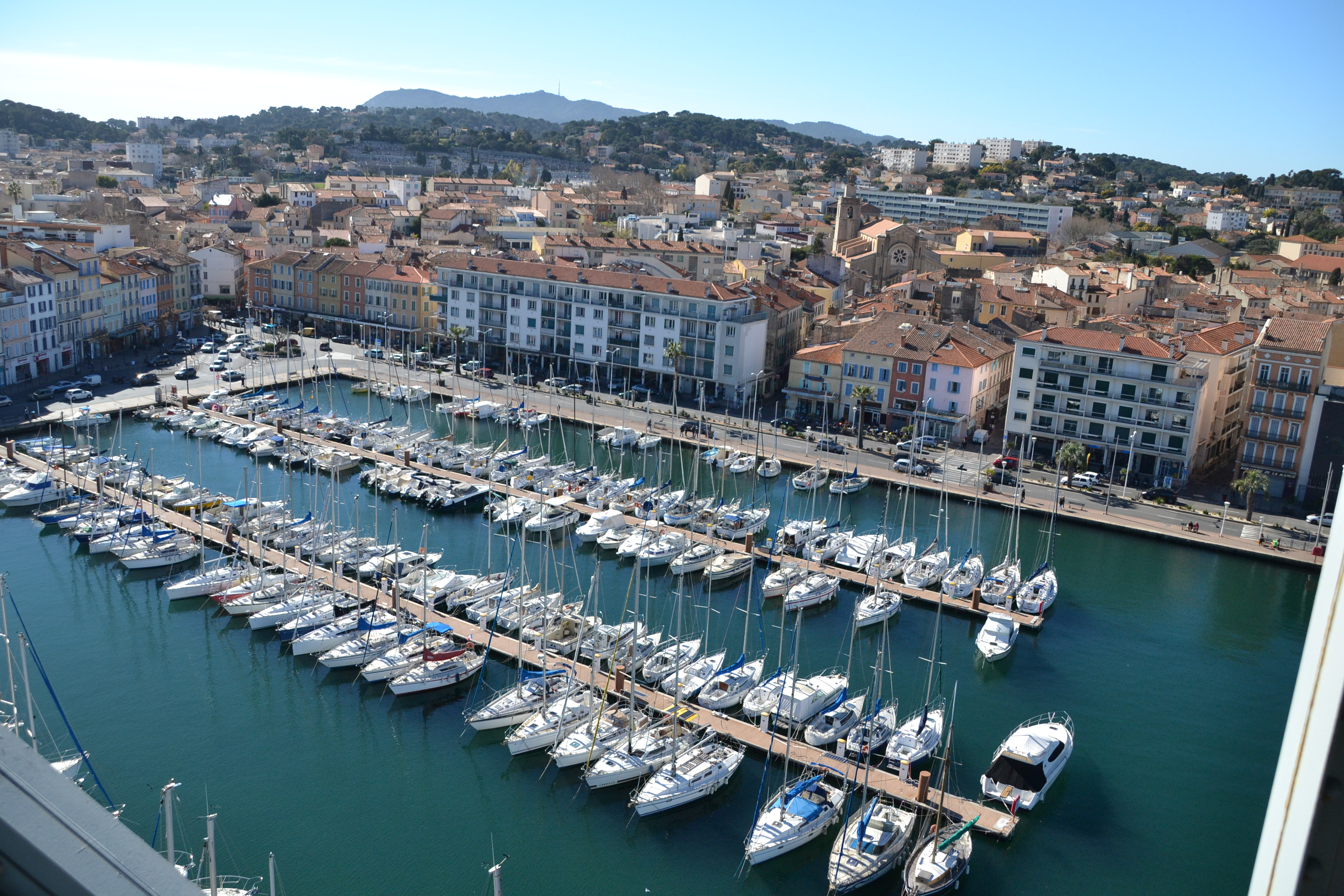
A view of the marina and town centre in La Seyne-sur-Mer

In earlier decades, La Seyne-sur-Mer owed its importance to the shipbuilding trade, the Société des Forges et Chantiers de la Mediterranée having here one of the finest shipbuilding yards in Europe (it was a branch of the larger establishment at Marseille), which gave employment to about 3,000 workers.

In recent years the town has moved from its traditional industries to tourism. The docks previously used have had extensive work and now comprise a park, marinas and a new (2010) hotel overlooking Toulon and the marinas.

The population is diverse in origins and the outer suburbs are undergoing a transformation with old multi storey apartments being replaced with modern developments. La Seyne has a railway station, Gare de La Seyne-Six-Fours, on the line from Toulon to Marseille.

Ba'athist Iraq's "Osiris class" nuclear reactors, later destroyed by Israel in Operation Opera, were built in La Seyne-sur-Mer.

== Buildings and structures ==
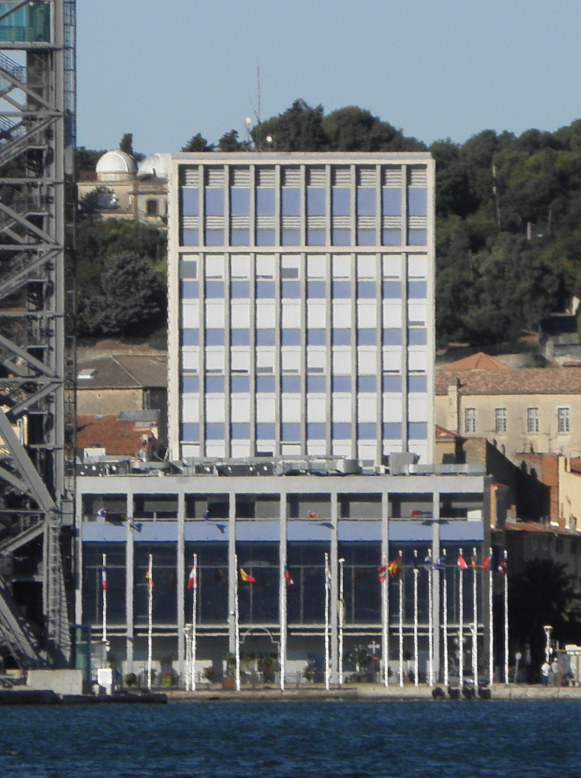
The Hôtel de Ville

- The Hôtel de Ville completed in 1959
- Pont basculant de la Seyne-sur-Mer, a former bascule bridge
- Institut Michel-Pacha, a building in the néo-mauresque style which hosted a research laboratory in marine biology from 1900 until 2008.

== Personalities linked to La Seyne-sur-Mer ==
- Jean Gaspard de Vence (1747–1808)
- Napoléon Bonaparte (1769–1821)
- George Sand (1804–1876)
- Michel Pacha (1819–1907)
- Henri Rieunier (1833–1918)
- Maurice Tranchant de Lunel (1869-1944), French architect died in La Seyne
- Jean Marquet (1883–1954)
- Henri Olive Tamari (1898–1980)
- Édouard Jauffret (1900–1945)
- Fernand Bonifay (1920–1993)
- Gabriel Pérès (1920–2004)
- Pierre Moustiers (1924–2016)
- Johannès Galland (1934)
- Henri Tisot (1937–2011)
- Polly Matzinger (1947)
- Andrzej "André" Orliński (1954), Polish adventurer, musician and philosopher
- Valerie Hirschfield (1964)
- Léon Loppy (1966)
- Marcus Malte (1967)
- Frédéric Meyrieu (1968)
- Gérald Orsoni (1972)
- Patrice Collazo (1974)
- Marc Zanotti (1975)
- Sylvain Prudhomme (1979), French writer
- Sébastien Squillaci (1980)
- Mohamed Sy (1980)
- Camille Traversa (1981)
- Pascal Ragondet (1983)
- John Revox (1983)
- Sébastien Bisciglia (1984)
- Alexis Farjaudon (1985)
- Bafétimbi Gomis (1985), footballer currently playing for Al-Hilal FC
- Fabien Lamatina (1985)
- Pier-Nicol Feldis (1986)
- Jérôme J. Dufourg (1986)
- Bruno Lancelle (1986)
- Emmanuel Ragondet (1987)
- Jonathan Tornato (1989)
- Mickaël Ivaldi (1990)
- Christophe Laporte (1992), cyclist
- Nampalys Mendy (1992)
- Gaël Fickou (1994)

== See also ==
- Communes of the Var department
