= Hôtel de Ville, La Seyne-sur-Mer =

Town hall in La Seyne-sur-Mer, France

Hôtel de Ville
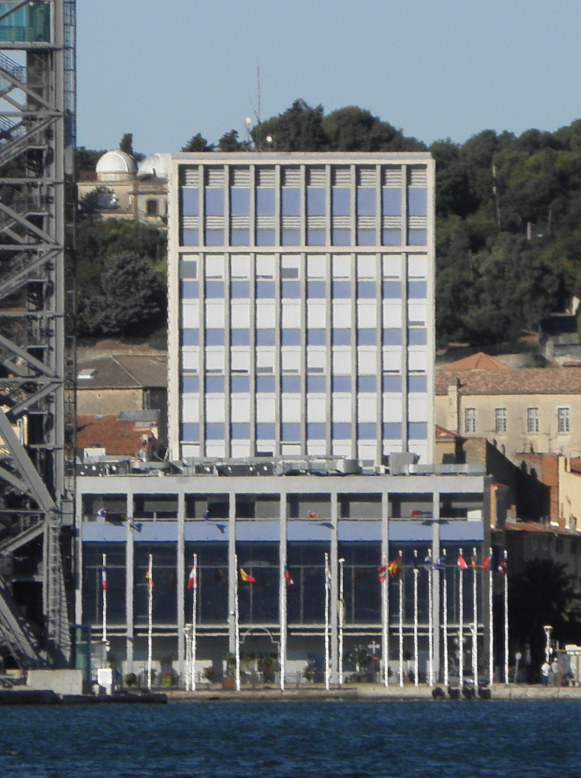
- The main frontage of the Hôtel de Ville in September 2009
- Interactive map of the Hôtel de Ville area

General information
- Type: City hall
- Architectural style: Modern style
- Location: La Seyne-sur-Mer, France
- Coordinates: 43.1021°N 5.8811°E
- Completed: 1959

Design and construction
- Architect: Jean de Mailly

The Hôtel de Ville (French pronunciation: [otɛl də vil], City Hall) is a municipal building in La Seyne-sur-Mer, Var, in southern France, standing on Quai Saturnin Fabre.

== History ==
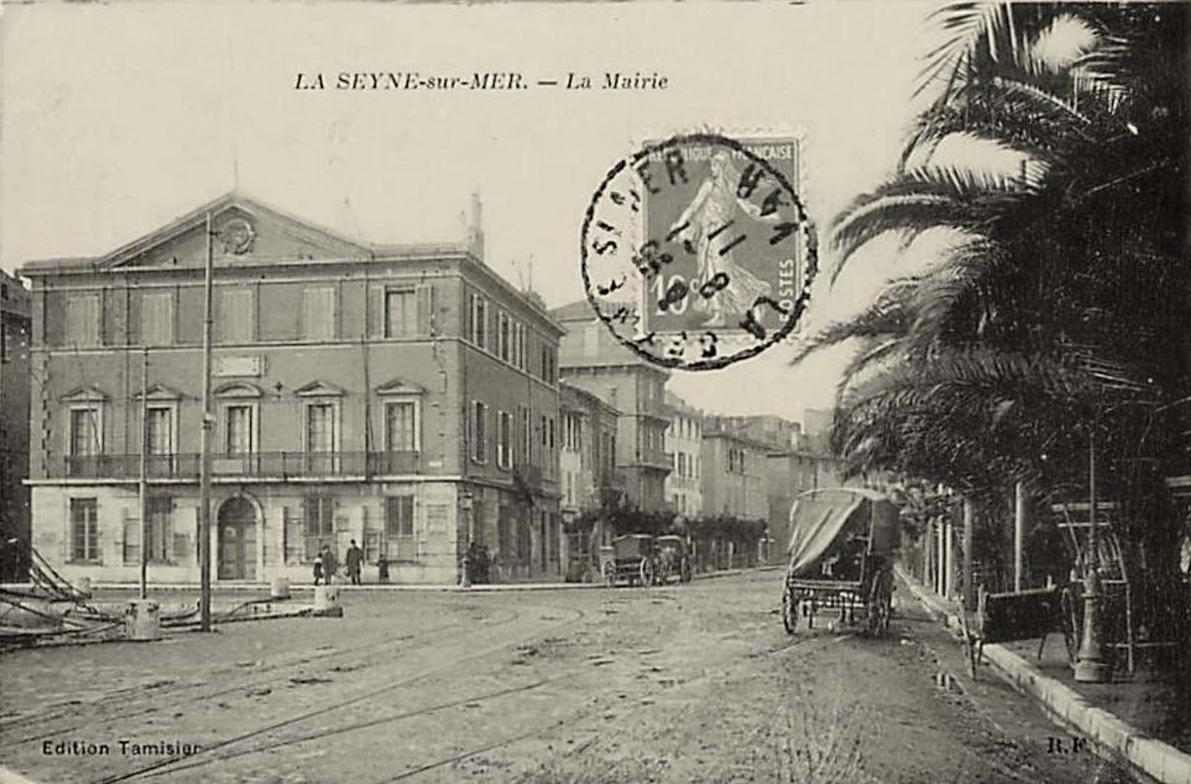
The old town hall

The first municipal building in La Seyne-sur-Mer was a private house located on Rue du Palais (now Rue Berby). It was commissioned by the seigneur of Ramatuelle, Michel Tortel, and completed in the late 16th century. It then served as the Maison Commune until local officials relocated to No. 2 Rue de l'Hôtel de Ville (now Rue Carvin) in the 18th century. In November 1844, the town council led by the mayor, Boniface Picon, decided to move to the port district. The site they selected, at the north end of the Rue du Grand Môle (now Quai Saturnin Fabre), was owned by a local iron merchant, Blaise Pelegrin.

The new building was designed in the neoclassical style, built in ashlar stone and was officially opened by the new mayor, Jean-Louis Martinenq, in 1847. The design involved a symmetrical main frontage of five bays facing onto Rue du Grand Môle. The centre bay featured a round-head opening with voussoirs and a keystone on the ground floor, a French door with a segmental pediment on the first floor and a casement window with shutters on the second floor. The other bays were fenestrated by casement windows with iron grills on the ground floor, by French doors with triangular pediments on the first floor and by casement windows with shutters on the second floor. There was an iron balcony across all five bays on the first floor and, at roof level, there was a large pediment above the central three bays, with a clock in the tympanum. Internally, there was a grand staircase leading to the Salle du Conseil (council chamber) and Salle des Mariages (wedding room) on the first floor.

In October 1893, the mayor, Saturnin Fabre, welcomed the president of France, Sadi Carnot, to the wharf outside the town hall. Carnot was on a visit to launch the French battleship Jauréguiberry at a shipyard owned by Société Nouvelle des Forges et Chantiers de la Méditerranée in the town. The old town hall, along with the rest of the port area and much of the shipyard area, was destroyed by allied bombing on 17 August 1944 during Operation Dragoon, part of the Second World War.

After the war, the town council led by the mayor, Toussaint Merle, decided to clear the ruins of the old town hall and to erect a new town hall on the same site. The new building was designed by Jean de Mailly in the modern style, built in concrete and glass and was completed in January 1959. The design involved an asymmetrical main frontage of ten bays facing onto Quai Saturnin Fabre. The left hand-bay was clad in black tiles, while the other bays were clad in plate glass. There was a high-rise office block encased in grey and blue cladding behind, accommodating the municipal offices. The north wall featured a mural by Victor Vasarely depicting a series of coloured cubes presented in op art-style which was completed in 1988.
