= Jonathan Tornato =

French basketball player

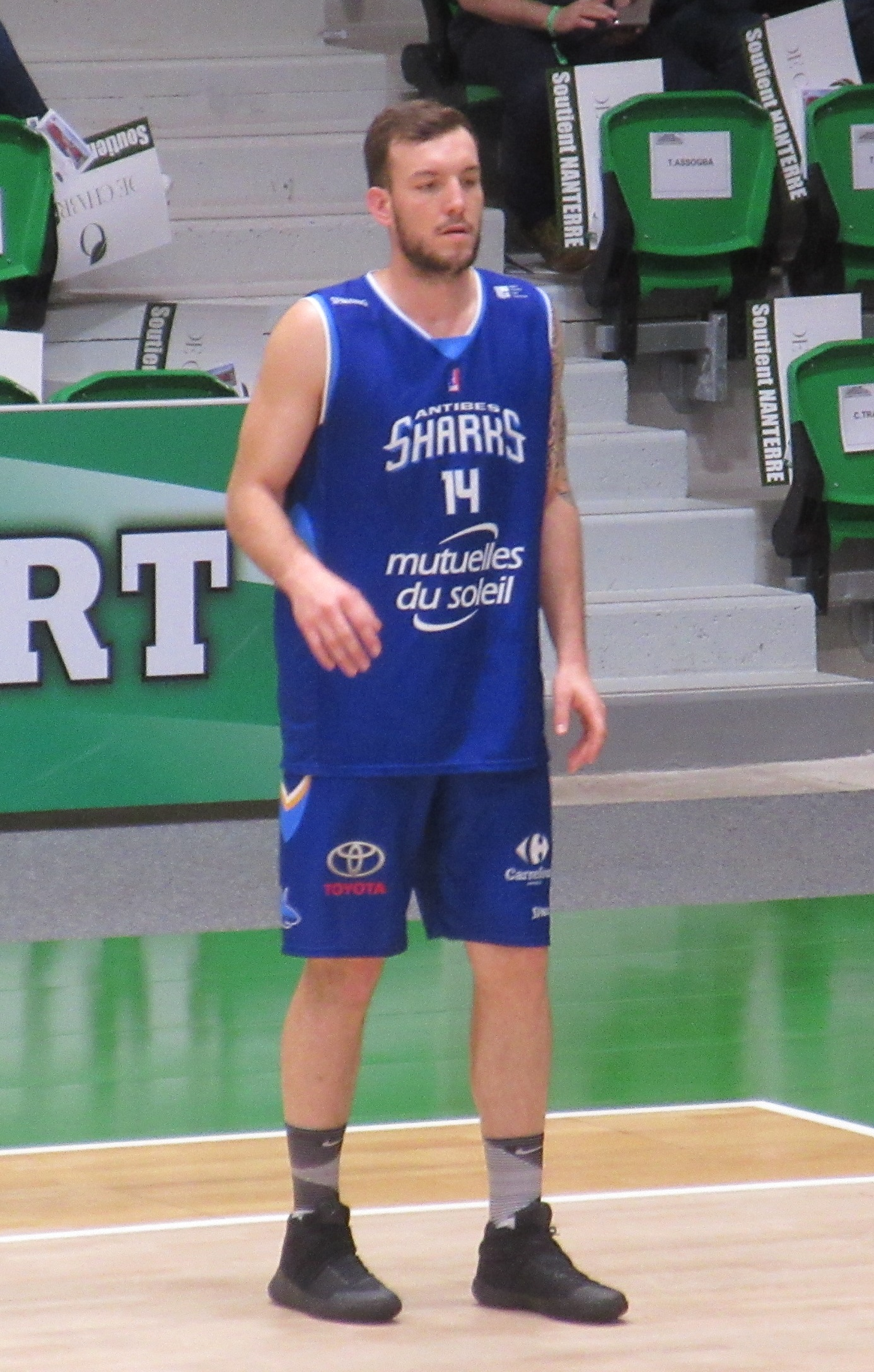

No. 14 – Antibes Sharks
- Position: Center
- League: LNB Pro A

Personal information
- Born: June 1, 1989 (age 37) La Seyne-sur-Mer, France
- Listed height: 6 ft 11 in (2.11 m)
- Listed weight: 209 lb (95 kg)

Career information
- NBA draft: 2011: undrafted
- Playing career: 2008–present

Career history
- 2007–2009: JDA Dijon
- 2009-2010: JSF Nanterre
- 2010–2011: JDA Dijon
- 2011-2013: ADA Blois
- 2013-2015: AS Monaco
- 2015-2016: Hyères-Toulon
- 2016-2018: Antibes Sharks

Career highlights
- Pro B champion (2016)

Jonathan Tornato (born June 1, 1989) is a French professional basketball player for Olympique Antibes of LNB Pro A.

Tornato played with AS Monaco until he was cut in 2015. He posted 8.5 points and 5.2 rebounds per game in his last year. On October 1, 2016, he signed with the Antibes Sharks. He averaged 11.7 points and 6.8 rebounds per game with the Sharks.
