= The Judge and the Assassin =

1976 French drama film directed by Bertrand Tavernier

- Video tape cover
- Directed by: Bertrand Tavernier
- Written by: Jean Aurenche; Pierre Bost; Bertrand Tavernier
- Produced by: Raymond Danon
- Starring: Philippe Noiret; Michel Galabru
- Cinematography: Pierre-William Glenn
- Edited by: Armand Psenny
- Music by: Philippe Sarde
- Distributed by: Fox-Lira
- Release date: 10 March 1976
- Running time: 128 minutes
- Country: France
- Language: French
- Box office: $6.9 million

The Judge and the Assassin (French: Le Juge et l'assassin) is a 1976 French drama film directed by Bertrand Tavernier that stars Philippe Noiret, Isabelle Huppert, Michel Galabru, and Jean-Claude Brialy. Set in France in the 1890s, it shows the capture after a trail of rapes and murders of a possibly deranged ex-soldier, based on the historical Joseph Vacher, and how he is befriended by an ambitious judge who leads him into incriminating himself. The film won two César Awards in 1977.

== Plot ==
Ex-sergeant Bouvier, expelled from the army for fits of violence, shoots at Louise when she rejects him and then puts his last two bullets in his own head. The pair survive, and he is shut away in an asylum. Rejecting civil society on his release, he wanders the countryside raping and murdering isolated teenage children. His crimes are followed closely by Rousseau, a provincial judge, and when Bouvier enters his jurisdiction he is arrested. Pretending to be his friend who will get him off on a plea of insanity, Rousseau humours his whims and encourages him to incriminate himself. In fact, Rousseau is seeking personal glory and career advancement. When Bouvier is condemned, Rousseau's working-class mistress Rose joins the strikers in the town factory. A postscript notes that hundreds more children died in factories than Bouvier's few highly-publicised victims.

== Selected cast ==
- Philippe Noiret as Judge Rousseau
- Michel Galabru as Joseph Bouvier
- Isabelle Huppert as Rose, Rousseau's mistress
- Jean-Claude Brialy as public prosecutor Villedieu
- Renée Faure as Rousseau's mother
- Cécile Vassort as Louise, courted by Bouvier
- Jean-Roger Caussimon as a street singer
- Jean Bretonnière as a parliamentary deputy
- Daniel Russo as jailer
- Christine Pascal (uncredited) as a striker

== See also ==
- Isabelle Huppert on screen and stage
