= Malicious Pleasure =

French film

Malicious Pleasure (aka Evil Pleasure, Sly Pleasure (French title: Le malin plaisir) is a French film directed by Bernard Toublanc Michel, released in 1975, and it stars Jacques Weber, Claude Jade, Anny Duperey, Nicoletta Machiavelli, Mary Marquet, Cécile Vassort.

== Synopsis ==
Philippe Malaiseau, writer and historian, being deceased before to have completed his study of Charles The Great, the editor dispatches in Fontbonne the young writer Marc (Jacques Weber). In Fontbonne five women are: Julie (Claude Jade), very particular and charming secretary who allures Marc, the old mother of Malaiseau (Mary Marquet), Marianne (Anny Duperey), the distant widow, Christine (Cécile Vassort), the cousin, and Melisa (Nicoletta Machiavelli), an Italian friend. The four women all are related to Malaiseau. Did he really die by a simple accident? Marc continues a kind of investigation in the arms of Christine, of Julie and of Melissa which, in turn, succumb to its charm and him entrust force details which strengthen its conviction: Philippe was indeed assassinated... In agreement with Marianne, he will make "sing" Melissa, Julie, Christine and Mrs Malaiseau, accomplices in the murder of Philippe. And those to accept its requirements: Doesn't Marc make, henceforth, part of the family?
