= Canton of La Seyne-sur-Mer-1 =

Coordinates: 43.10°N 5.88°E

The canton of La Seyne-sur-Mer-1 is an administrative division of the Var department, southeastern France. It was created at the French canton reorganisation which came into effect in March 2015. Its seat is in La Seyne-sur-Mer.

It consists of the following communes:

1. La Seyne-sur-Mer (partly)
