= Fabien Lamatina =

French footballer (born 1985)

Personal information
- Date of birth: 3 July 1985 (age 41)
- Place of birth: La Seyne-sur-Mer, France
- Height: 1.77 m (5 ft 9 1/2 in)
- Position: Attacking midfielder

Senior career*
Years	Team	Apps	(Gls)
2003–2006	Nice (B team)	67	(15)
2006–2009	Racing Ferrol	90	(22)
2009–2011	Stade Lavallois	30	(3)
2012–2016	US Marignane	125	(19)
2016–2019	Marignane Gignac		
- * Club domestic league appearances and goals

Fabien Lamatina (born 3 July 1985) is a retired French professional football player.

Lamatina made a total of 30 league appearances for Stade Lavallois in Ligue 2 from 2009 to 2011.
