= Cécile Vassort =

French actress (born 1941)

- Born: 2 June 1941 (age 84)
- Occupation: Actress
- Years active: 1963-2001

Cécile Vassort (born 2 June 1941) is a French film actress. She has starred in 45 films between 1963 and 2001.

== Partial filmography ==
- A Woman in White (1965) - La jeune mère
- Is Paris Burning? (1966) - Une jeune femme (uncredited)
- Fleur d'oseille (1967) - Cécile
- Benjamin (1968) - Aline
- A Little Virtuous (1968) - Janine
- Angel's Leap (1971) - Luisa
- L'Italien des Roses (1972) - La mariée
- The Invitation (1973) - Aline
- Deux hommes dans la ville (1973) - Évelyne Cazeneuve
- The Clockmaker (1974) - Martine - une ouvrière
- Pleasure Party (1974) - Annie
- Malicious Pleasure (1975) - Christine
- The Judge and the Assassin (1976) - Louise Leseuer
- La situation est grave mais... pas désespérée ! (1976) - Annie, la bonne
- La Barricade du point du jour (1978) - Leila
- 5% de risque (1980) - La fille de la boîte de nuit
- The Lady of the Camellias (1981) - Henriette
- One Deadly Summer (1983) - Josette
- Blanche et Marie (1985) - Woman at police
- Three Men and a Cradle (1985) - Annick
- Le testament d'un poète juif assassiné (1988) - Sheina Rosenblum
- Adieu, je t'aime (1988) - Valérie
- La Lumière des étoiles mortes (1994) - Louise
- Mo' (1996) - Mme Bernard
- Captain Conan (1996) - Georgette
- A Crime in Paradise (2001)
