= Bel Ami (French miniseries) =

1983 television miniseries by Pierre Cardinal

Bel Ami is a 1983 French language television miniseries adaptation of Guy de Maupassant's 1885 novel Bel-Ami. Written by Pierre Moustiers, the two episode series was directed by Pierre Cardinal. The cast included Jacques Weber as Georges Duroy, Aurore Clément as Madeleine Forestier, Michel Auclair as M. Walter, Anne Consigny as Suzanne, Rosette as Rachel, Denis Manuel as Charles Forestier, Micheline Bona as Mme La Roche Mathieu, Johan Corbeau as L'évêque, Dominique Daguier as Le lithographe, and Jacques Deloir as Langremont.
