= Pierre Cardinal =

French screenwriter and director (1924–1998)

- Born: 8 June 1924
- Died: 16 May 1998 (aged 73)
- Occupation: Screenwriter
- Years active: 1952–1988

Pierre Cardinal (8 June 1924 – 16 May 1998) was a French screenwriter and director. His sister was author Marie Cardinal. He directed the 1983 mini series Bel Ami.

== Filmography ==
=== Film ===
- 1952 : Heart of the Casbah
- 1955 : Fantaisie d'un jour

=== Television ===
- 1961 : Le rouge et le noir
- 1962 : Candide ou l'optimisme
- 1965 : La grande peur dans la montagne
- 1967 : L'oeuvre
- 1968 : La bonifas
- 1969 : Le ciel et l'enfer
- 1971 : Vipère au poing
- 1971 : Sous le soleil de Satan
- 1972 : Les fossés de Vincennes
- 1975 : Saint-Just et la force des choses
- 1978 : 68 dans le monde
- 1980 : La vie de Pierre de Coubertin

=== Series ===
- 1961 : Elan blanc
- 1964 : La route
