= Pont basculant de la Seyne-sur-Mer =

Coordinates: 43.1026°N 5.8831°E

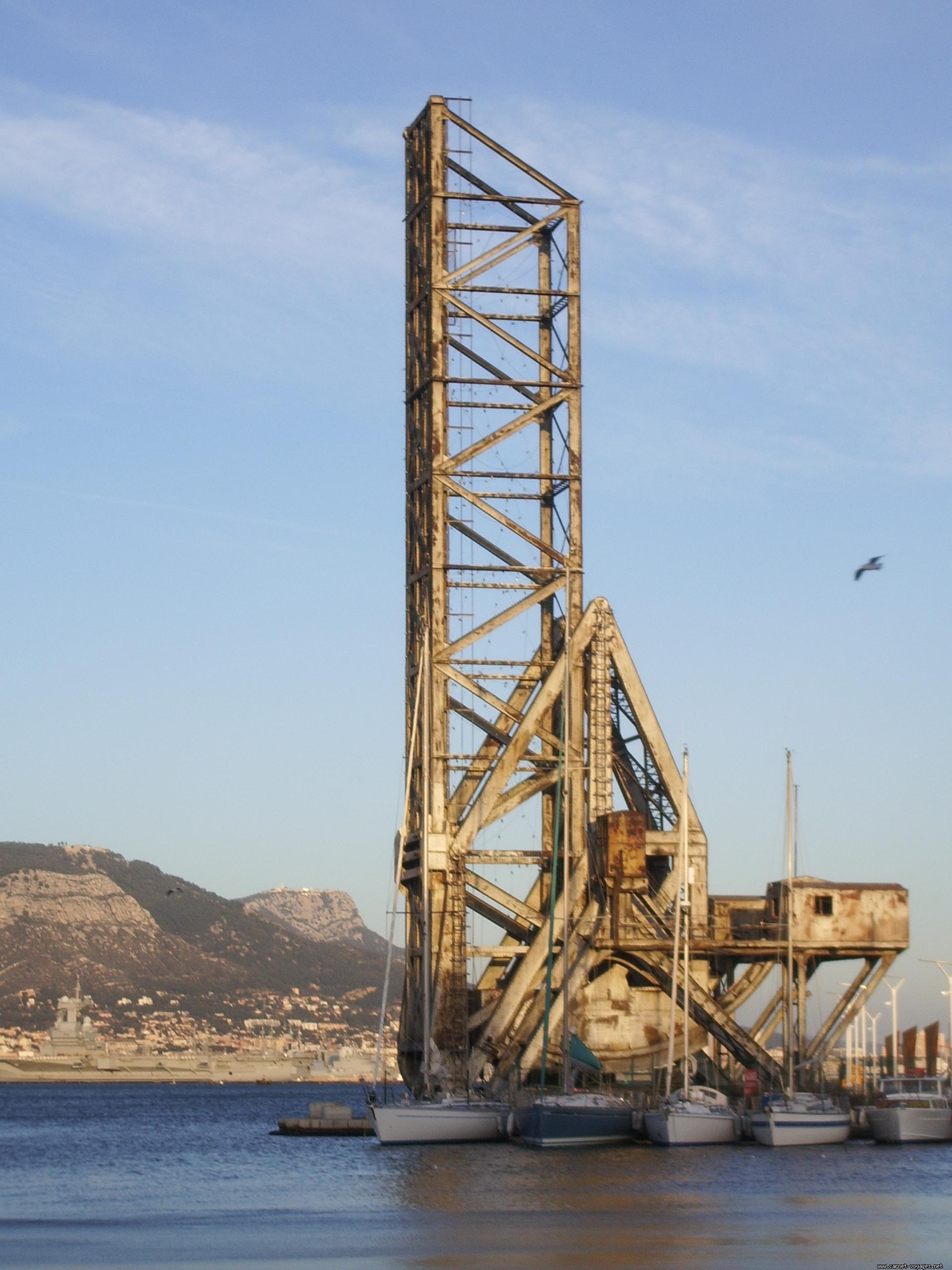
The bridge, in its now permanently open position.

Pont basculant de la Seyne-sur-Mer is a former bascule bridge in La Seyne-sur-Mer in France. It was completed in 1918 and served originally as railway bridge. Today, it is permanently opened and used as 43-metre-tall observation tower.
