= Bel-Ami =

1885 novel by Guy de Maupassant

- Author: Guy de Maupassant
- Original title: Bel-Ami
- Illustrator: Ferdinand Bac
- Language: French
- Genre: Literary realism
- Publisher: Paul Ollendorff
- Publication date: 1885
- Publication place: France
- English publication date: 1903
- Pages: 394
- Dewey Decimal: 843.8
- LC Class: PZ3 .M445
- Original text: Bel-Ami at French Wikisource
- Translation: Bel-Ami at Wikisource

Bel-Ami ([bɛlami], "Dear Friend") is the second novel by French author Guy de Maupassant, published in 1885; an English translation titled Bel Ami, or, The History of a Scoundrel: A Novel first appeared in 1903.

The story chronicles journalist Georges Duroy's corrupt rise to power from a poor former cavalry NCO in France's African colonies, to one of the most successful men in Paris, most of which he achieves by manipulating a series of powerful, intelligent, and wealthy women.

== Summary ==
The novel is set in Paris in the upper-middle class environment of the leading journalists of the newspaper La Vie Française and their friends. It tells the story of Georges Duroy, who has spent three years in military service in Algeria. After working for six months as a clerk in Paris, an encounter with his former comrade, Forestier, enables him to start a career as a journalist. From a reporter of minor events and soft news, he gradually climbs his way up to chief editor. Duroy initially owes his success to Forestier's wife, Madeleine, who helps him write his first articles and, when he later starts writing lead articles, she adds an edge and poignancy to them. At the same time, she uses her connections among leading politicians to provide him with behind the scenes' information which allows him to become actively involved in politics. Duroy is also introduced to many politicians in Madame Forestier's drawing-room. Duroy becomes the lover of Forestiers' friend Mme de Marelle, another influential socialite. Duroy later tries to seduce Madeleine Forestier too, but she repulses Duroy's sexual advances and offers that they remain friends without ulterior motives.

In a few months, Charles Forestier's health deteriorates, and he travels to the south of France to regain it. Soon afterwards, Duroy receives a letter from Madeleine, imploring him to join her and help her bear the last moments of her husband's life. When Forestier dies, Duroy asks Madeleine to marry him. After a few weeks to consider, she agrees. Georges now signs his articles Du Roy (an aristocratic style of French name) in order to add prestige to his name. The married couple travels to Normandy, the region of Georges's childhood, and meets his peasant parents. Finding the reality different from her romantic expectations, Madeleine feels very uncomfortable with his parents, and so their stay with them is short. In the newspaper office, Duroy is ridiculed for having his articles written by his wife, just as the late Forestier had his articles written by her. His newspaper colleagues call him 'Forestier', which angers Georges, and he becomes heavily jealous of Madeleine, insisting that she admit having been unfaithful to Forestier, but she never does.

In order to suppress the stings of jealousy, Duroy starts an affair with Mme Walter, the wife of the owner of the newspaper. He especially enjoys the conquest, as he is her first extramarital lover. Later on, however, he regrets the decision, for he cannot get rid of her when he does not want her. Duroy's relations with his wife become estranged; at one point, he takes a police superintendent and three other police officers to a flat in which his wife is meeting Monsieur Laroche-Mathieu, her lover. They catch the two in the act of adultery, which was then a crime punishable under the law. Duroy used the police as witnesses of his wife's adultery to facilitate their divorce. He did not have her or her lover arrested, although the police gave him the option to do so.

In the last two chapters, Duroy's ascent to power continues. Duroy, now a single man, makes use of his chief's daughter's infatuation with him, and arranges an elopement with her. The parents then have no other choice but to grant their assent to the marriage. The last chapter shows Duroy savouring his success at the wedding ceremony, at which 'all those who figured prominently in society' are present. His thoughts, however, chiefly belong to Mme de Marelle who, when wishing him all the best, indicates that she has forgiven him for his new marriage and that their intimate meetings can be taken up again.

== List of characters ==
- Georges Duroy (Du Roy), an ex-soldier, journalist and a social climber
- Charles Forestier, Duroy's former friend in the army, a journalist
- Madeleine Forestier (Du Roy), Charles's and later Georges's wife who helps her husbands write their articles and has many connections among the powerful
- Monsieur Laroche-Mathieu, a friend of Madeleine Forestier, a member of parliament, later a minister who owes his position and sudden wealth to La Vie Française, Madeleine Forestier's lover
- Comte de Vaudrec, an old longtime friend and protector and probably also lover or lost father of Madeleine Forestier (Du Roy)
- Clotilde de Marelle, the Forestiers' friend whose husband is away for long periods of time, Duroy's main lover
- Laurine de Marelle, their young daughter, who comes up with the nickname Bel Ami.
- Jacques Rival, a journalist
- Norbert de Varenne, an old single bitter life-tired poet who is among the Vie Française staff
- Monsieur Walter, the owner and chief editor of the Vie Francaise
- Virginie Walter, his wife, later Duroy's lover
- Suzanne Walter, their marriageable daughter, later Madame Du Roy
- Rachel, a prostitute to whom Georges turns in times of financial crisis

== Adaptations ==
=== Film and television ===
The novel has been adapted for film and television several times:

- Bel Ami, a 1939 German film
- The Private Affairs of Bel Ami, a 1947 American film starring George Sanders
- Bel Ami (1955)
- Bel Ami (1971), a five-episode BBC TV series
- Bel Ami: The big surprise!, a 1976 Swedish pornographic version, starring Harry Reems
- Bel Ami, a 1983 French mini-series
- Bel Ami, a 2005 French/Belgian TV movie, starring Sagamore Stévenin
- Bel Ami, a 2012 European co-production film with Robert Pattinson, Uma Thurman, Kristin Scott Thomas, Christina Ricci and Holliday Grainger

=== Theatre ===
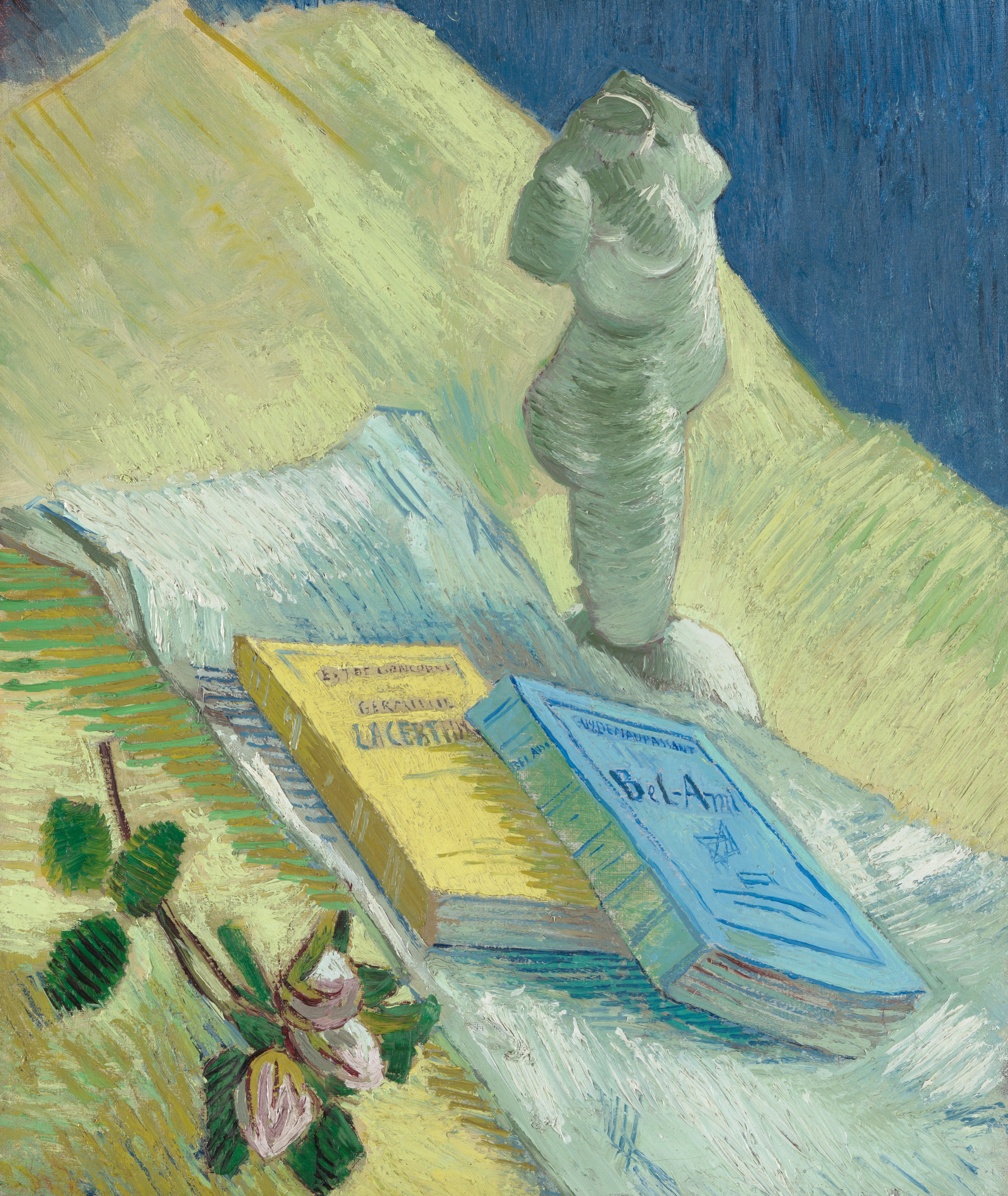
Still life with plaster statuette, a rose and two novels by Vincent van Gogh (Kröller-Müller Museum)

"The Wicked World of Bel Ami", a musical in two acts adapted by Ken Hill using the music of Jacques Offenbach, was staged at the Theatre Royal Stratford East 7 April – 13 May 1989 with Haluk Bilginer in the title role

Miláček, a Czech stage version of the story, premiered on 11 April 2008 in City Theatre, Mladá Boleslav. It was directed by Pavel Khek, with Petr Mikeska in the title role of Georges Duroy.

In July 2011, Bel Ami: The Musical was staged at the White Bear Theatre, London. It premiered on July 12. It was written and directed by Linnie Reedman, with music and lyrics composed by Joe Evans.

In February 2014, a contemporary musical adaptation of the book, Bel-Ami, was staged at the Charing Cross Theatre, London, performed by students of the London College of Music. The music and lyrics were written by Alex Loveless.

== Cultural influence ==
John Braine, the English novelist, stated that his favourite author was Guy de Maupassant and that his first novel, Room at the Top (1957), was based on Bel Ami, but 'the critics didn't pick it up'.
