= 2024 Washington Huskies football team =

American college football season

2024 Washington Huskies football

Sun Bowl, L 34–35 vs. Louisville
- Conference: Big Ten Conference
- Record: 6–7 (4–5 Big Ten)
- Head coach: Jedd Fisch (1st season)
- Offensive coordinator: Brennan Carroll (1st season)
- Offensive scheme: Pro-style
- Defensive coordinator: Stephen Belichick (1st season)
- Base defense: Multiple 4–2–5
- Home stadium: Husky Stadium

2024 Big Ten Conference football standings
	Conf.			Overall
Team	W		L	W		L
No. 3 Oregon y$^	9	–	0	13	–	1
No. 10 Indiana ^	8	–	1	11	–	2
No. 5 Penn State y^	8	–	1	13	–	3
No. 1 Ohio State #^	7	–	2	14	–	2
No. 16 Illinois	6	–	3	10	–	3
Iowa	6	–	3	8	–	5
Michigan	5	–	4	8	–	5
Minnesota	5	–	4	8	–	5
USC	4	–	5	7	–	6
Rutgers	4	–	5	7	–	6
Washington	4	–	5	6	–	7
Nebraska	3	–	6	7	–	6
UCLA	3	–	6	5	–	7
Wisconsin	3	–	6	5	–	7
Northwestern	2	–	7	4	–	8
Maryland	1	–	8	4	–	8
Michigan State†	0	–	6	0	–	7
Purdue	0	–	9	1	–	11
Championship: Oregon 45, Penn State 37
# – College Football Playoff champion; ^ – College Football Playoff participant; $ – Conference champion; y – Championship game participant; † — NCAA vacated all wins for Michigan State (5–7, 3–6); Rankings from AP Poll

The 2024 Washington Huskies football team represented the University of Washington as a member of the Big Ten Conference during the 2024 NCAA Division I FBS football season. Led by first-year head coach Jedd Fisch, the Huskies played home games on campus at Husky Stadium in Seattle.

This was Washington's first season in the Big Ten, after over a century in the Pac-12 Conference and its predecessors.

After finishing with a College Football Playoff National Championship game appearance the previous year, the Huskies regressed under Fisch, finishing with their first losing season since 2021 and only their third since 2008.

== Preseason ==
=== Big Ten media poll ===
In the Pac-12 preseason media poll, Washington was predicted to finish in tenth place in the conference.

=== Transfers ===
2024 Transfers
Name	Num	Pos.	Height	Weight	Year	Hometown	Transferred from
Jonah Coleman	1	RB	5'9"	225	Sophomore	Stockton, CA	Arizona
Jeremiah Hunter	3	WR	6'2"	178	Junior	Fresno, CA	California
Ephesians Prysock	7	DB	6'4"	190	Sophomore	Mission Hills, CA	Arizona
Kevin Green Jr.	12	WR	5'11"	170	(redshirt) Freshman	Mission Hills, CA	Arizona
Ethan Barr	32	LB	6'3"	210	Senior	Flower Mound, TX	Vanderbilt
B. J. Green II	35	EDGE	6'0"	260	Junior	Atlanta, GA	USC
Anthony Ward	57	LB	6'1"	195	Sophomore	Ontario, CA	Arizona
Drew Azzopardi	74	OT	6'5"	317	(redshirt) Freshman	Pacifica, CA	San Diego State
Tre Watson	84	TE	6'5"	205	Junior	Rio Rancho, NM	Fresno State
Keleki Latu	85	TE	6'7"	244	Junior	Sacramento, CA	Nevada
Isaiah Ward	90	DL	6'5"	225	(redshirt) Freshman	Ontario, CA	Arizona
Sebastian Valdez	95	DL	6'3"	284	Junior	Spring Valley, CA	Montana State
Russell Davis II	99	DL	6'3"	220	Sophomore	Chandler, AZ	Arizona
Name	Num	Pos.	Height	Weight	Year	Hometown	Transferred to
Jaivion Green	0	CB	6'1"	185	Sophomore	Houston, TX	Stanford
Jabbar Muhammad	1	CB	5'10"	180	Junior	DeSoto, TX	Oregon
Mishael Powell	3	S	6'1"	204	(redshirt) Junior	Seattle, WA	Miami (FL)
Germie Bernard	4	WR	6'1"	203	Sophomore	Las Vegas, NV	Alabama
Dylan Morris	5	QB	6'0"	190	(redshirt) Junior	Puyallup, WA	James Madison
Austin Mack	10	QB	6'8"	206	Freshman	Folsom, CA	Alabama
William Haskell	14	QB	6'4"	200	(redshirt) Sophomore	Glendale, AZ	Portland State
Taeshaun Lyons	15	WR	6'2.5"	161	Freshman	Hayward, CA	Utah
Asa Turner	20	S	6'3"	200	Senior	Carlsbad, CA	Florida
Jakson Berman	27	CB	6'0"	175	(redshirt) Freshman	San Jose, CA	TBD
Vincent Nunley	28	CB	6'1"	180	(redshirt) Sophomore	Oakland, CA	TBD
Nate Kalepo	71	OT	6'6"	341	(redshirt) Junior	Seattle, WA	Ole Miss
Parker Brailsford	72	OL	6'2"	275	(redshirt) Freshman	Mesa, AZ	Alabama
Julius Buelow	77	OG	6'8"	313	(redshirt) Junior	Kapolei, HI	Ole Miss
Josh Cuevas	85	TE	6'3"	239	Sophomore	Los Angeles, CA	Alabama
Griffin Waiss	86	TE	6'5"	230	(redshirt) Sophomore	San Jose, CA	TBD

== Schedule ==
Date	Time	Opponent	Site	TV	Result	Attendance
August 31	8:00 p.m.	No. 22 (FCS) Weber State*	Husky Stadium; Seattle, WA	BTN	W 35–3	66,984
September 7	12:30 p.m.	Eastern Michigan*	Husky Stadium; Seattle, WA	BTN	W 30–9	64,222
September 14	12:30 p.m.	vs. Washington State*	Lumen Field; Seattle, WA (Apple Cup)	Peacock	L 19–24	57,567
September 21	4:00 p.m.	Northwestern	Husky Stadium; Seattle, WA	FS1	W 24–5	69,788
September 27	5:00 p.m.	at Rutgers	SHI Stadium; Piscataway, NJ	FOX	L 18–21	54,079
October 5	4:30 p.m.	No. 10 Michigan	Husky Stadium; Seattle, WA	NBC	W 27–17	72,132
October 12	9:00 a.m.	at Iowa	Kinnick Stadium; Iowa City, IA	FOX	L 16–40	69,250
October 26	9:00 a.m.	at No. 13 Indiana	Memorial Stadium; Bloomington, IN (College GameDay)	BTN	L 17–31	53,082
November 2	4:30 p.m.	USC^{†}	Husky Stadium; Seattle, WA	BTN	W 26–21	71,251
November 9	5:00 p.m.	at No. 6 Penn State	Beaver Stadium; State College, PA (White Out)	Peacock	L 6–35	110,233
November 15	6:00 p.m.	UCLA	Husky Stadium; Seattle, WA	FOX	W 31–19	68,811
November 30	4:30 p.m.	at No. 1 Oregon	Autzen Stadium; Eugene, OR (rivalry)	NBC	L 21–49	59,603
December 31	11:00 a.m.	vs. Louisville*	Sun Bowl; El Paso, TX (Sun Bowl)	CBS	L 34–35	40,826
*Non-conference game; ^{†}Homecoming; Rankings from AP Poll - Released prior to game; All times are in Pacific time; Source:

== Rankings ==
Ranking movements Legend: ██ Increase in ranking ██ Decrease in ranking — = Not ranked RV = Received votes
	Week																
Poll	Pre	1	2	3	4	5	6	7	8	9	10	11	12	13	14	15	Final
AP	RV	RV	RV	—	—	—	RV	—	—	—	—	—	—	—	—	—	—
Coaches	RV	25	22	RV	RV	—	RV	—	—	—	—	—	—	—	—	—	—
CFP	Not released										—	—	—	—	—	—	Not released

== Game summaries ==
=== No. 22 (FCS) Weber State ===
No. 22 (FCS) Weber State Wildcats (0–0) at Washington Huskies (0–0) – Game summary

Quarter	1	2	3	4	Total
No. 22 (FCS) Wildcats	0	0	3	0	3
Huskies	0	14	14	7	35

at Husky Stadium, Seattle, Washington

- Date: August 31
- Game time: 8:00 p.m. PDT
- Game weather: Clear, 76 °F (24 °C)
- Game attendance: 66,984
- Referee: Franciso Villar
- TV announcers (BTN): Jeff Levering (play-by-play), Jake Butt (analyst), Lincoln Kennedy (analyst), and Brooke Fletcher (reporter)
- Box score, Recap

Game information
First quarter
- No scoring plays

Second quarter

- WASH – Jonah Coleman 5-yard run (Grady Gross kick), 12:15. Huskies 7–0. Drive: 7 plays, 65 yards, 2:45.
- WASH – Decker DeGraaf 33-yard pass from Will Rogers (Grady Gross kick), 2:53. Huskies 14–0. Drive: 4 plays, 72 yards, 1:29.

Third quarter

- WASH – Jonah Coleman 5-yard run (Grady Gross kick), 8:53. Huskies 21–0. Drive: 12 plays, 90 yards, 5:55.
- WASH – Jonah Coleman 1-yard run (Grady Gross kick), 3:50. Huskies 28–0. Drive: 7 plays, 65 yards, 3:47.
- WEB – Kyle Thompson 28-yard field goal, 0:19. Huskies 28–3. Drive: 12 plays, 56 yards, 3:25.

Fourth quarter

- WASH – Denzel Boston 6-yard pass from Demond Williams Jr. (Grady Gross kick), 11:52. Huskies 35–3. Drive: 7 plays, 74 yards, 3:22.

Statistics	WEB	WASH
First downs	16	25
Total yards	253	482
Rushing yards	155	204
Passing yards	98	278
Turnovers	0	0
Time of possession	29:29	30:31

Team	Category	Player	Statistics
Weber State	Passing	Ritchie Munoz	11/32, 98 yards
Weber State	Rushing	Damon Bankston	16 rushes, 108 yards
Weber State	Receiving	Tajon Evans	1 reception, 26 yards
Washington	Passing	Will Rogers	20/26, 250 yards, TD
Washington	Rushing	Jonah Coleman	16 rushes, 127 yards
Washington	Receiving	Giles Jackson	10 receptions, 98 yards

=== Eastern Michigan ===
Eastern Michigan Eagles (1–0) at Washington Huskies (1–0) – Game summary

Quarter	1	2	3	4	Total
Eagles	3	3	0	3	9
Huskies	0	21	9	0	30

at Husky Stadium, Seattle, Washington

- Date: September 7
- Game time: 12:30 p.m. PDT
- Game weather: Clear, 79 °F (26 °C)
- Game attendance: 64,222
- Referee: Gregory Blum
- TV announcers (BTN): Mark Followill (play-by-play), Lincoln Kennedy (analyst), and Alyssa Charlston (reporter)
- Box score, Recap

Game information
First quarter
- EMU – Jesus Gomez 57-yard field goal, 0:07. Eagles 3–0. Drive: 10 plays, 53 yards, 3:42.

Second quarter

- WASH – Decker DeGraaf 41-yard pass from Will Rogers (Grady Gross kick), 9:37. Huskies 7–3. Drive: 6 plays, 82 yards, 3:05.
- EMU – Jesus Gomez 29-yard field goal, 4:49. Huskies 7–6. Drive: 11 plays, 64 yards, 4:48.
- WASH – Denzel Boston 13-yard pass from Will Rogers (Grady Gross kick), 3:07. Huskies 14–6. Drive: 3 plays, 80 yards, 1:36.
- WASH – Denzel Boston 1-yard pass from Will Rogers (Grady Gross kick), 0:24. Huskies 21–6. Drive: 8 plays, 65 yards, 1:27.

Third quarter

- WASH – Jeremiah Hunter 24-yard pass from Will Rogers (kick blocked), 9:57. Huskies 27–6. Drive: 4 plays, 58 yards, 2:18.
- WASH – Grady Gross 28-yard file goal, 0:50. Huskies 30–6. Drive: 12 plays, 56 yards, 6:04.

Fourth quarter

- EMU – Jesus Gomez 50-yard field goal, 8:09. Huskies 30–9. Drive: 15 plays, 43 yards, 7:41.

Statistics	EMU	WASH
First downs	17	23
Total yards	204	501
Rushing yards	75	185
Passing yards	129	316
Turnovers	1	1
Time of possession	31:55	28:05

Team	Category	Player	Statistics
Eastern Michigan	Passing	Cole Snyder	16/27, 129 yards
Eastern Michigan	Rushing	Dontae McMillan	8 rushes, 33 yards
Eastern Michigan	Receiving	Zyell Griffin	2 receptions, 35 yards
Washington	Passing	Will Rogers	21/26, 261 yards, 4 TD
Washington	Rushing	Jonah Coleman	11 rushes, 104 yards
Washington	Receiving	Jeremiah Hunter	5 receptions, 72 yards, TD

=== vs. Washington State (Apple Cup) ===
Washington State Cougars (2–0) vs. Washington Huskies (2–0) – Game summary

Quarter	1	2	3	4	Total
Cougars	10	7	7	0	24
Huskies	7	6	6	0	19

at Lumen Field, Seattle, Washington

- Date: September 14
- Game time: 12:30 p.m. PDT
- Game weather: Cloudy, 62 °F (17 °C)
- Game attendance: 57,567
- Referee: Stephen Baron
- TV announcers (Peacock): Paul Burmeister (play-by-play), Colt McCoy (analyst), and Zora Stephenson (reporter)
- Box score, Recap

Game information
First quarter
- WSU – Dean Janikowski 44-yard field goal, 8:58. Cougars 3–0. Drive: 4 plays, 3 yards, 0:51.
- WASH – Giles Jackson 31-yard pass from Will Rogers (Grady Gross kick), 7:16. Huskies 7–3. Drive: 4 plays, 75 yards, 1:42.
- WSU – John Mateer 23-yard run (Dean Janikowski kick), 4:16. Cougars 10–7. Drive: 6 plays, 72 yards, 2:51.

Second quarter

- WASH – Grady Gross 44-yard field goal, 14:56. Tied 10–10. Drive: 10 plays, 48 yards, 4:20.
- WASH – Grady Gross 42-yard field goal, 9:10. Huskies 13–10. Drive: 7 plays, 56 yards, 3:19.
- WSU – John Mateer 25-yard run (Dean Janikowski kick), 0:21. Cougars 17–13. Drive: 6 plays, 91 yards, 1:41.

Third quarter

- WASH – Grady Gross 24-yard field goal, 9:47. Cougars 17–16. Drive: 11 plays, 67 yards, 5:06.
- WSU – Josh Meredith 16-yard pass from John Mateer (Dean Janikowski kick), 5:54. Cougars 24–16. Drive: 6 plays, 77 yards, 3:45.
- WASH – Grady Gross 43-yard field goal, 0:00. Cougars 24–19. Drive: 12 plays, 50 yards, 5:54.

Fourth quarter

- No scoring plays

Statistics	WSU	WASH
First downs	25	21
Total yards	381	452
Rushing yards	136	126
Passing yards	245	326
Turnovers	1	0
Time of possession	27:55	32:05

Team	Category	Player	Statistics
Washington State	Passing	John Mateer	17/34, 245 yards, TD, INT
Washington State	Rushing	John Mateer	16 rushes, 62 yards, 2 TD
Washington State	Receiving	Josh Meredith	7 receptions, 111 yards, 2 TD
Washington	Passing	Will Rogers	23/31, 314 yards, TD
Washington	Rushing	Jonah Coleman	14 rushes, 75 yards
Washington	Receiving	Giles Jackson	8 receptions, 162 yards, TD

=== Northwestern ===
Northwestern Wildcats (2–1) at Washington Huskies (2–1) – Game summary

Quarter	1	2	3	4	Total
Wildcats	0	2	3	0	5
Huskies	7	10	0	7	24

at Husky Stadium, Seattle, Washington

- Date: September 21
- Game time: 4:00 p.m. PDT
- Game weather: Sunny, 68 °F (20 °C)
- Game attendance: 69,788
- Referee: Jeffrey Servinski
- TV announcers (FS1): Alex Faust (play-by-play) and Robert Smith (analyst)
- Box score, Recap

Game information
First quarter
- WASH – Denzel Boston 46-yard pass from Will Rogers (Grady Gross kick), 7:57. Huskies 7–0. Drive: 6 plays, 73 yards, 2:39.

Second quarter

- WASH – Grady Gross 21-yard field goal, 14:11. Huskies 10–0. Drive: 11 plays, 88 yards, 5:36.
- WASH – Denzel Boston 13-yard pass from Will Rogers (Grady Gross kick), 10:12. Huskies 17–0. Drive: 4 plays, 31 yards, 1:59;
- NU – Will Rogers intentional grounding in own end zone, 6:38. Huskies 17–2

Third quarter

- NU – Jack Olsen 18-yard field goal, 5:07. Huskies 17–5. Drive: 8 plays, 32 yards, 4:16.

Fourth quarter

- WASH – Jonah Coleman 8-yard run (Grady Gross kick), 14:02. Huskies 24–5. Drive: 11 plays, 77 yards, 5:58.

Statistics	NW	WASH
First downs	12	22
Total yards	112	391
Rushing yards	59	144
Passing yards	53	247
Turnovers	2	1
Time of possession	27:08	32:52

Team	Category	Player	Statistics
Northwestern	Passing	Jack Lausch	8/27, 53 yards, 2 INT
Northwestern	Rushing	Jack Lausch	13 rushes, 21 yards
Northwestern	Receiving	A. J. Henning	5 receptions, 41 yards
Washington	Passing	Will Rogers	20/28, 223 yards, 2 TD
Washington	Rushing	Jonah Coleman	15 rushes, 67 yards, TD
Washington	Receiving	Denzel Boston	7 receptions, 121 yards, 2 TD

=== at Rutgers ===
Washington Huskies (3–1) at Rutgers Scarlet Knights (3–0) – Game summary

Quarter	1	2	3	4	Total
Huskies	3	0	7	8	18
Scarlet Knights	0	14	0	7	21

at SHI Stadium, Piscataway, New Jersey

- Date: September 27
- Game time: 5:00 p.m. PDT/8:00 p.m. EDT
- Game weather: Cloudy • Temperature: 66 °F (19 °C) • Wind: E 4 mph
- Game attendance: 54,079
- Referee: Jerry McGinn
- TV announcers (Fox): Tim Brando (play-by-play), Devin Gardner (analyst), and Josh Sims (sideline)

Game information

First quarter

- (4:10) UW – Grady Gross 22-yard field goal (Drive: 10 plays, 69 yards, 4:57; Washington 3–0)

Second quarter

- (11:26) RU – Kyle Monangai 1-yard run, Jai Patel kick (Drive: 15 plays, 75 yards, 7:44; Rutgers 7–3)
- (0:30) RU – Ian Strong 15-yard pass from Athan Kaliakmanis, Jai Patel kick (Drive: 10 plays, 81 yards, 3:56; Rutgers 14–3)

Third quarter

- (4:23) UW – Denzel Boston 51-yard pass from Will Rogers, Grady Gross kick (Drive: 6 plays, 94 yards, 3:00; Rutgers 14–10)

Fourth quarter

- (10:57) RU – Samuel Brown V 37-yard run, Jai Patel kick (Drive: 10 plays, 85 yards, 5:26; Rutgers 21–10)
- (1:40) UW – Denzel Boston 12-yard pass from Will Rogers, Keleki Latu pass (Drive: 12 plays, 76 yards, 2:56; Rutgers 21–18)

Statistics	WASH	RUTG
First downs	23	15
Total yards	521	299
Rushing yards	207	184
Passing yards	314	115
Turnovers	0	0
Time of possession	30:34	29:26

Team	Category	Player	Statistics
Washington	Passing	Will Rogers	26/36, 306 yards, 2 TD
Washington	Rushing	Jonah Coleman	16 carries, 148 yards
Washington	Receiving	Denzel Boston	6 receptions, 125 yards, 2 TD
Rutgers	Passing	Athan Kaliakmanis	14/24, 115 yards, TD
Rutgers	Rushing	Kyle Monangai	25 carries, 132 yards, TD
Rutgers	Receiving	Ian Strong	5 receptions, 40 yards, TD

=== No. 10 Michigan ===
No. 10 Michigan Wolverines (4–1) at Washington Huskies (3–2) – Game summary

Quarter	1	2	3	4	Total
No. 10 Wolverines	0	10	7	0	17
Huskies	7	7	0	13	27

at Husky Stadium, Seattle, Washington

- Date: October 5
- Game time: 4:30 p.m. PDT
- Game weather: 63 °F (17 °C), sunny, N 8 miles per hour (13 km/h)
- Game attendance: 72,132
- Referee: Kole Knueppel
- TV announcers (NBC): Noah Eagle (play-by-play), Todd Blackledge (analyst), and Kathryn Tappen (sideline)

Game information

First quarter

- (2:38) Washington – Denzel Boston 3-yard pass from Will Rogers (Grady Gross kick) (Drive: 13 plays, 83 yards, 5:16; Washington 7–0)

Second quarter

- (9:38) Washington – Giles Jackson 16-yard pass from Will Rogers (Grady Gross kick) (Drive: 4 plays, 74 yards, 2:16; Washington 14–0)
- (5:25) Michigan – Donovan Edwards 39-yard run (Dominic Zvada kick) (Drive: 7 plays, 75 yards, 4:13; Washington 14–7)
- (1:49) Michigan – Dominic Zvada 45-yard field gold (Drive: 8 plays, 56 yards, 2:38; Washington 14–10)

Third quarter

- (8:38) Michigan – Colston Loveland 8-yard pass from Jack Tuttle (Dominic Zvada kick) (Drive: 11 plays, 75 yards, 6:22; Michigan 17–14)

Fourth quarter

- (13:38) Washington – Grady Gross 28-yard field gold (Drive: 12 plays, 45 yards, 6:00; Tied 17–17)
- (6:22) Washington – Jonah Coleman 1-yard run (Grady Gross kick) (Drive: 4 plays, 32 yards, 1:40; Washington 24–17)
- (1:06) Washington – Grady Gross 32-yard field gold (Drive: 6 plays, 26 yards, 2:18; Washington 27–17)

Statistics	MICH	WASH
First downs	17	23
Total yards	287	429
Rushing yards	174	114
Passing yards	113	315
Turnovers	2	1
Time of possession	30:30	29:30

Team	Category	Player	Statistics
Michigan	Passing	Jack Tuttle	10/18, 98 yards, TD, INT
Michigan	Rushing	Donovan Edwards	14 carries, 95 yards, TD
Michigan	Receiving	Colston Loveland	6 receptions, 33 yards, TD
Washington	Passing	Will Rogers	21/31, 271 yards, 2 TD, INT
Washington	Rushing	Jonah Coleman	18 carries, 80 yards, TD
Washington	Receiving	Denzel Boston	5 receptions, 80 yards, TD

=== at Iowa ===
Washington Huskies (4–2) at Iowa Hawkeyes (3–2) – Game summary

Quarter	1	2	3	4	Total
Huskies	0	10	0	6	16
Hawkeyes	7	13	3	17	40

at Kinnick Stadium, Iowa City, Iowa

- Date: October 12
- Game time: 9:00 a.m. PDT
- Game weather: 70 °F (21 °C), sunny, E 8 miles per hour (13 km/h)
- Game attendance: 69,250
- Referee: Tim O'Dey
- TV announcers (Fox): Jason Benetti (play-by-play), Brock Huard (analyst), and Allison Williams (sideline)

Game information

First quarter

- 1:33 Iowa – Kaleb Johnson 6-yard run (Drew Stevens kick) (Drive: 9 plays, 80 yards, 4:24; Iowa 7–0)

Second quarter

- 9:19 Washington – Denzel Boston 5-yard pass from Will Rogers (Grady Gross kick) (Drive: 14 plays, 75 yards, 7:14; Tied 7–7)
- 4:43 Iowa – Drew Stevens 37-yard field goal (Drive: 4 plays, 0 yards, 1:27; Iowa 10–7)
- 1:28 Iowa – Kaleb Johnson 18-yard pass from Cade McNamara (Drew Stevens kick) (Drive: 5 plays, 35 yards, 1:40; Iowa 17–7)
- 0:29 Washington – Grady Gross 35-yard field goal (Drive: 9 plays, 58 yards, 0:59; Iowa 17–10)
- 0:00 Iowa – Drew Stevens 46-yard field goal (Drive: 4 plays, 53 yards, 0:24; Iowa 20–10)

Third quarter

- 7:22 Iowa – Drew Stevens 25-yard field goal (Drive: 9 plays, 47 yards, 4:21; Iowa 23–10)

Fourth quarter

- 14:56 Iowa – Kaleb Johnson 8-yard run (Drew Stevens kick) (Drive: 8 plays, 61 yards, 4:29; Iowa 30–10)
- 12:51 Iowa – Dayton Howard 33-yard pass from Cade McNamara (Drew Stevens kick) (Drive: 1 plays, 33 yards, 0:07; Iowa 37–10)
- 9:45 Iowa – Drew Stevens 51-yard field goal (Drive: 4 plays, 5 yards, 1:32; Iowa 40–10)
- 2:58 Washington – Rashid Williams 2-yard pass from Demond Williams Jr. (pass failed) (Drive: 17 plays, 75 yards, 6:47; Iowa 40–16)

Statistics	WASH	IOWA
First downs	23	20
Total yards	393	328
Rushing yards	127	220
Passing yards	266	108
Turnovers	2	0
Time of possession	34:59	22:03

Team	Category	Player	Statistics
Washington	Passing	Will Rogers	22/34, 195 yards, TD, INT
Washington	Rushing	Jonah Coleman	9 carries, 80 yards
Washington	Receiving	Giles Jackson	9 receptions, 63 yards
Iowa	Passing	Cade McNamara	8/14, 108 yards, 2 TD
Iowa	Rushing	Kaleb Johnson	21 carries, 166 yards, 2 TD
Iowa	Receiving	Dayton Howard	1 reception, 33 yards, TD

=== at No. 13 Indiana ===
Washington Huskies (4–3) at No. 13 Indiana Hoosiers (7–0) – Game summary

Quarter	1	2	3	4	Total
Huskies	0	7	7	3	17
No. 13 Hoosiers	7	10	7	7	31

at Memorial Stadium, Bloomington, Indiana

- Date: October 26
- Game time: 9:00 a.m. PDT
- Game weather: Sunny • Temperature: 57 °F (14 °C) • Wind: NE at 10 miles per hour (16 km/h)
- Game attendance: 53,082
- Referee: Kole Knueppel
- TV announcers (BTN): Guy Haberman (play-by-play), Yogi Roth (analyst), and Rhett Lewis (sideline reporter)

Game information

First Quarter

- (7:41) IU – D'Angelo Ponds 67-yard interception return, Nicolas Radicic kick (Indiana 7–0)

Second Quarter

- (13:24) IU – Omar Cooper Jr. 7-yard pass from Tayven Jackson, Nicolas Radicic kick (Drive: 2 plays, 46 yards, 0:27, Indiana 14–0)
- (7:40) WASH – Giles Jackson 6-yard run, Grady Gross kick (Drive: 6 plays, 75 yards, 2:50, Indiana 14–7)
- (0:00) IU – Nicolas Radicic 19-yard field goal (Drive: 19 plays, 62 yards, 7:30; Indiana 17–7)

Third Quarter

- (12:45) WASH – Demond Williams Jr. 8-yard run, Grady Gross kick (Drive: 4 plays, 24 yards, 2:06, Indiana 17–14)
- (5:03) IU – Justice Ellison 5-yard run, Nicolas Radicic kick (Drive: 14 plays, 75 yards, 7:42, Indiana 24–14)

Fourth Quarter

- (8:55) IU – Tayven Jackson 4-yard run, Nicolas Radicic kick (Drive: 4 plays, 14 yards, 2:18, Indiana 31–14)
- (6:06) WASH – Grady Gross 23-yard field goal (Drive: 8 plays, 65 yards, 2:43; Indiana 31–17)

Statistics	WASH	IU
First downs	16	20
Total yards	318	312
Rushing yards	116	188
Passing yards	202	124
Turnovers	2	1
Time of possession	28:36	31:24

Team	Category	Player	Statistics
Washington	Passing	Will Rogers	19/26, 202 yards, 2 INT
Washington	Rushing	Jonah Coleman	19 carries, 104 yards
Washington	Receiving	Jeremiah Hunter	4 receptions, 60 yards
Indiana	Passing	Tayven Jackson	11/19, 124 yards, TD, INT
Indiana	Rushing	Justice Ellison	29 carries, 123 yards, TD
Indiana	Receiving	Omar Cooper Jr.	1 reception, 42 yards, TD

=== USC ===
USC Trojans (4–4) at Washington Huskies (4–4) – Game summary

Quarter	1	2	3	4	Total
Trojans	0	7	14	0	21
Huskies	10	10	0	6	26

at Husky Stadium, Seattle, Washington

- Date: November 2
- Game time: 4:30 p.m. PDT
- Game weather: Cloudy
- Game attendance: 71,251
- Referee: Tim O'Dey
- TV announcers (BTN): Jeff Levering (play-by-play), Jake Butt (analyst), and Brooke Fletcher (sideline)

Statistics	USC	WASH
First downs	26	21
Total yards	459	375
Rushing yards	166	113
Passing yards	293	262
Turnovers	3	0
Time of possession	33:05	26:55

Team	Category	Player	Statistics
USC	Passing	Miller Moss	30/50, 293 yards, 2 TD, 3 INT
USC	Rushing	Woody Marks	22 carries, 123 yards, TD
USC	Receiving	Zachariah Branch	6 receptions, 102 yards
Washington	Passing	Will Rogers	25/39, 262 yards
Washington	Rushing	Jonah Coleman	23 carries, 102 yards, 2 TD
Washington	Receiving	Denzel Boston	9 receptions. 99 yards

=== at No. 6 Penn State ===
Washington Huskies (5–4) at No. 6 Penn State Nittany Lions (7–1) – Game summary

Quarter	1	2	3	4	Total
Huskies	0	0	3	3	6
No. 6 Nittany Lions	7	21	0	7	35

at Beaver Stadium, University Park, Pennsylvania

- Date: November 9
- Game time: 5:00 p.m. PST
- Game weather: Sunny, 46 °F (8 °C)
- Game attendance: 110,233
- Referee: Mark Kluczynski
- TV announcers (Peacock): Paul Burmeister (play-by-play), Colt McCoy (analyst), and Zora Stephenson (sideline)

Game information

First quarter

- PSU – Beau Pribula, 8-yard TD run, Ryan Barker kick, 3:48 (PSU 7–0)

Second quarter

- PSU – Tyler Warren, 2-yard TD run, Barker kick, 9:22 (PSU 14–0)
- PSU – Warren, 2-yard TD run, Barker kick, 3:23 (PSU 21–0)
- PSU – Julian Fleming, 8-yard TD pass from Drew Allar, Barker kick, 0:23 (PSU 28–0)

Third quarter

- UW – Grady Gross, 24-yard field goal, 9:47 (PSU 28–3)

Fourth quarter

- UW – Gross, 35-yard field goal, 13:33 (PSU 28–6)
- PSU – Kaytron Allen, 1-yard TD run, Barker kick, 4:50 (PSU 34–6)

Statistics	WASH	PSU
First downs	14	24
Total yards	193	486
Rushing yards	74	266
Passing yards	119	220
Turnovers	1	1
Time of possession	28:52	31:08

Team	Category	Player	Statistics
Washington	Passing	Will Rogers	10/13, 59 yards, INT
Washington	Rushing	Demond Williams Jr.	10 carries, 38 yards
Washington	Receiving	Giles Jackson	5 receptions, 23 yards
Penn State	Passing	Drew Allar	20/28, 220 yards, TD
Penn State	Rushing	Kaytron Allen	20 carries, 98 yards, TD
Penn State	Receiving	Tyler Warren	8 receptions, 75 yards

=== UCLA ===
UCLA Bruins (4–5) at Washington Huskies (5–5) – Game summary

Quarter	1	2	3	4	Total
Bruins	0	10	3	6	19
Huskies	7	7	3	14	31

at Husky Stadium, Seattle, Washington

- Date: November 15
- Game time: 6:00 p.m. PST
- Game weather: Cloudy
- Game attendance: 68,811
- Referee: Jeffrey Servinski
- TV announcers (Fox): Connor Onion (play-by-play) and Mark Helfrich (analyst)

Statistics	UCLA	WASH
First downs	21	20
Total yards	319	305
Rushing yards	52	123
Passing yards	267	182
Turnovers	2	2
Time of possession	33:03	26:57

Team	Category	Player	Statistics
UCLA	Passing	Ethan Garbers	27/44, 267 yards, 2 TD
UCLA	Rushing	T.J. Harden	13 carries, 33 yards
UCLA	Receiving	Moliki Matavao	7 receptions, 68 yards, TD
Washington	Passing	Will Rogers	13/21, 115 yards, TD, 2 INT
Washington	Rushing	Jonah Coleman	21 carries, 95 yards, 2 TD
Washington	Receiving	Giles Jackson	8 receptions, 43 yards

=== at No. 1 Oregon (rivalry) ===
Washington Huskies (6–5) at No. 1 Oregon Ducks (11–0) – Game summary

Quarter	1	2	3	4	Total
Huskies	3	11	0	7	21
No. 1 Ducks	7	21	7	14	49

at Autzen Stadium, Eugene, Oregon

- Date: November 30
- Game time: 4:30 p.m. PST
- Game weather: 37 °F (3 °C), cloudy
- Game attendance: 59,603
- Referee: Jerry McGinn
- TV announcers (NBC): Noah Eagle (play-by-play), Todd Blackledge (analyst), and Kathryn Tappen (sideline)

Statistics	WASH	ORE
First downs	17	28
Total yards	244	458
Rushing yards	43	222
Passing yards	201	236
Turnovers	1	1
Time of possession	32:03	27:57

Team	Category	Player	Statistics
Washington	Passing	Demond Williams Jr.	17/20, 201 yards, TD
Washington	Rushing	Adam Mohammed	4 carries, 23 yards
Washington	Receiving	Giles Jackson	6 receptions, 69 yards, TD
Oregon	Passing	Dillon Gabriel	16/23, 209 yards, 2 TD
Oregon	Rushing	Jordan James	15 carries, 99 yards, 2 TD
Oregon	Receiving	Traeshon Holden	3 receptions, 73 yards

=== vs. Louisville (Sun Bowl) ===
2024 Sun Bowl
Louisville Cardinals (8–4) vs Washington Huskies (6–6) – Game summary

Quarter	1	2	3	4	Total
Cardinals	14	7	14	0	35
Huskies	7	14	0	13	34

at Sun Bowl • El Paso, Texas

- Date: December 31
- Game time: 11:00 a.m. PST
- Game weather: Sunny • Temperature: 62 °F (17 °C) • Wind: 3 mph (4.8 km/h) SE
- Game attendance: 40,826
- TV announcers (CBS/Bowl Season Radio): Brad Nessler (play-by-play), Gary Danielson (analyst), and Jenny Dell (sideline)/Bruce Howard (play-by-play), John Denton (analyst), and Colin Deaver (sideline)

Game information

First quarter

- (12:15) LOU – Tahveon Nicholson 21-yard interception return (Brock Travelstead kick) (Louisville 7–0)
- (8:09) WASH – Giles Jackson 40-yard pass from Demond Williams Jr. (Grady Gross kick) (Drive: 3 plays, 57 yards, 1:29; Tied 7–7)
- (0:27) LOU – Caullin Lacy 9-yard pass from Harrison Bailey (Brock Travelstead kick) (Drive: 5 plays, 32 yards, 2:50; Louisville 14–7)

Second quarter

- (8:10) WASH – Giles Jackson 49-yard pass from Demond Williams Jr. (Grady Gross kick) (Drive: 1 play, 49 yards, 0:07; Tied 14–14)
- (4:34) LOU – Antonio Meeks 28-yard pass from Harrison Bailey (Brock Travelstead kick) (Drive: 7 plays, 79 yards, 3:25; Louisville 21–14)
- (0:51) WASH – Demond Williams Jr. 7-yard run (Grady Gross kick) (Drive: 10 plays, 75 yards, 3:43; Tied 21–21)

Third quarter

- (4:46) LOU – Nate Kurisky 21-yard pass from Harrison Bailey (Brock Travelstead kick) (Drive: 10 plays, 87 yards, 5:19; Louisville 28–21)
- (2:07) LOU – Caullin Lacy 8-yard run (Brock Travelstead kick) (Drive: 2 plays, 62 yards, 0:52; Louisville 35–21)

Fourth quarter

- (3:42) WASH – Giles Jackson 31-yard pass from Demond Williams Jr. (Grady Gross kick) (Drive: 13 plays, 97 yards, 6:10; Louisville 35–28)
- (0:09) WASH – Giles Jackson 1-yard pass from Demond Williams Jr. (2-pt conversion failed) (Drive: 11 plays, 62 yards, 2:29; Louisville 35–34)

Statistics	LOU	WASH
First downs	15	20
Total yards	371	472
Rushing yards	207	98
Passing yards	164	374
Passing: Comp–Att–Int	16–25–0	26–32–1
Time of possession	28:24	31:36

Team	Category	Player	Statistics
Louisville	Passing	Harrison Bailey	16–25, 164 yards, 3 TD
Louisville	Rushing	Isaac Brown	18 carries, 99 yards
Louisville	Receiving	Chris Bell	6 receptions, 60 yards
Washington	Passing	Demond Williams Jr.	26–32, 374 yards, 4 TD, INT
Washington	Rushing	Demond Williams Jr.	20 carries, 48 yards, TD
Washington	Receiving	Giles Jackson	11 receptions, 161 yards, 4 TD

== Roster ==
2024 Washington Huskies football team roster
Players
Coaches
Offense

Pos.	#	Name	Class
WR	0	Kevin Green Jr.	So
RB	1	Jonah Coleman	Jr
QB	2	Demond Williams Jr.	Fr
WR	3	Rashid Williams	Fr
RB	4	Jordan Washington	Fr
WR	5	Giles Jackson	Sr
WR	6	Jeremiah Hunter	Sr
QB	7	Will Rogers	Sr
WR	12	Denzel Boston	So
WR	13	Audric Harris	Fr
QB	14	Shea Kuykendall	So
WR	15	Keith Reynolds	Fr
WR	16	Justice Williams	Fr
QB	17	Teddy Purcell	Jr
WR	18	Camden Sirmon	Jr
RB	21	Daniyel Ngata	Sr
RB	22	Cameron Davis	Sr
WR	23	Jason Robinson Jr.	Fr
RB	24	Adam Mohammed	Fr
RB	25	Ryder Bumgarner	Fr
RB	28	Sam Adams II	Jr
WR	31	Luke Luchini	Fr
WR	35	Jace Burton	Fr
OL	53	Paki Finau	Fr
OL	54	Parker Cross	Fr
OL	55	Michael Levelle Watkins	Fr
OL	57	Enokk Vihami	Sr
OL	58	Zachary Henning	Fr
OL	63	Roice Cleeland	Fr
OL	64	Gaard Memmelaar	Jr
OL	66	Landen Hatchett	So
OL	67	Aidan Anderson	Fr
OL	68	Soane Faasalo	Fr
OL	70	Justin Hylkema	Fr
OL	71	Kahlee Tafai	Fr
OL	74	Drew Azzopardi	So
OL	75	D'Angalo Titialii	Sr
OL	76	Elishah Jackett	Fr
OL	77	Maximus McCree	Jr
OL	78	Davit Boyajyan	Fr
TE	80	Wilson Schwartz	Jr
WR	82	Owen Coutts	Jr
WR	83	Luke Gayton	Fr
WR	84	Jackson Girouard	Jr
TE	85	Keleki Latu	Sr
TE	86	Decker DeGraaf	Fr
TE	87	Ryan Otton	So
TE	88	Quentin Moore	Sr
TE	89	Charlie Crowell	Fr

Defense

Pos.	#	Name	Class
CB	0	Leroy Bryant	Fr
CB	2	Caleb Presley	Fr
CB	3	Jordan Shaw	Fr
S	4	Justin Harrington	Sr
DE	5	Zach Durfee	Sr
LB	6	Bryun Parham	Sr
CB	7	Ephesians Prysock	Jr
S	8	Cameron Broussard	Sr
CB	9	Thaddeus Dixon	Sr
DE	10	Lance Holtzclaw	So
LB	11	Alphonzo Tuputala	Sr
S	12	Tristan Dunn	So
S	13	Kamren Fabiculanan	Sr
DE	14	Milton Hopkins Jr.	Jr
S	15	Rahim Wright II	Fr
CB	16	Curley Reed III	Fr
LB	17	Deven Bryant	Fr
DE	18	Jayden Wayne	So
CB	19	Darren Barkins	Jr
S	20	Rahshawn Clark	Fr
DB	21	Dyson McCutcheon	Jr
S	23	Peyton Waters	Fr
S	24	Makell Esteen	Jr
CB	25	Elijah Jackson	Jr
CB	26	Elias Jackson	Fr
S	27	Vincent Holmes	Fr
LB	28	Khmori House	Fr
S	30	Kayden Greene	Fr
S	31	Paul Mencke Jr.	Fr
S	32	Tristan Warner	So
CB	40	Anay Nagarajan	Jr
DL	41	Deshawn Lynch	Jr
LB	42	Carson Bruener	Sr
LB	44	Hayden Moore	Fr
DE	45	Maurice Heims	Jr
DE	48	Jacob Lane	So
LB	49	Griffin Miller	So
DL	50	Sebastian Valdez	Sr
DE	52	Voi Tunuufi	Sr
LB	53	Logan Lisherness	Fr
LB	54	Drew Fowler	Sr
DL	55	Jacob Bandes	Sr
DL	56	Annas Davis	Fr
LB	57	Anthony Ward	Jr
DE	88	Jake Jennings	Jr
DL	90	Elinneus Davis	Fr
DE	91	Isaiah Ward	So
DL	92	Bryce Butler	Jr
DL	93	Tyrese Johnson	Fr
DL	94	Jayvon Parker	Jr
DL	95	Armon Parker	So
DL	97	Logan Sagapolu	Sr
DL	98	Omar Khan	Fr
DL	99	Russell Davis II	Jr

Special teams

Pos.	#	Name	Class
K	37	Sam Finnegan	Fr
P	38	Jack McCallister	Jr
P	43	Adam Saul	Jr
LS	47	Cameron Warchuck	Jr
LS	82	Caleb Johnston	So
K	95	Grady Gross	Jr
P	96	Troy Petz	So

Head coach

- Jedd Fisch

Coordinators/assistant coaches

- Brennan Carroll – Offensive coordinator/offensive line
- Stephen Belichick – Defensive coordinator
- Jordan Paopao – Special teams coordinator/tight ends
- Robert Bala – Inside linebackers
- Kevin Cummings – Wide receivers
- Jimmie Dougherty – Passing game coordinator/quarterbacks
- Scottie Graham – Running backs
- Jason Kaufusi – Run game coordinator/defensive line
- John Richardson – Cornerbacks
- Vinnie Sunseri – Safeties
- Tyler Owens – Director, strength and conditioning
- Ed Thompson – Director, speed and performance
- Aaron Brosz – Assistant, strength and conditioning
- Zack Cook – Assistant, strength and conditioning
- Trei Mitchell – Assistant, strength and conditioning
- Michael Switzer – Senior offensive analyst
- Armond Hawkins – Defensive analyst
- Austin Herink – Quality control, offense
- Luke Del Rio – Quality control, offense
- Caleb Wilson – Quality control, offense
- Donovan Jackson – Quality control, defense
- Kirkland Parker – Quality control, defense
- Aaron Van Horn – Quality control, defense
- Bailey McElwain – Quality control, special teams
- Dom Caldwell – Graduate assistant
- Jacob Smith – Graduate assistant
- Jake Lynch – Graduate assistant
- Keaton Wilkerson – Graduate assistant

Legend

- (C) Team captain
- (S) Suspended
- (I) Ineligible
- Injured
- Redshirt

Roster
Last update: 9/15/24
