= 2024 Louisville Cardinals football team =

American college football season

2024 Louisville Cardinals football

Sun Bowl champion

Sun Bowl, W 35–34 vs. Washington
- Conference: Atlantic Coast Conference
- Record: 9–4 (5–3 ACC)
- Head coach: Jeff Brohm (2nd season)
- Offensive coordinator: Brian Brohm (2nd season)
- Offensive scheme: Spread
- Co-defensive coordinators: Ron English (3rd season); Mark Hagen (2nd season)
- Base defense: 4–2–5 or 4–3
- Home stadium: L&N Stadium

Uniform
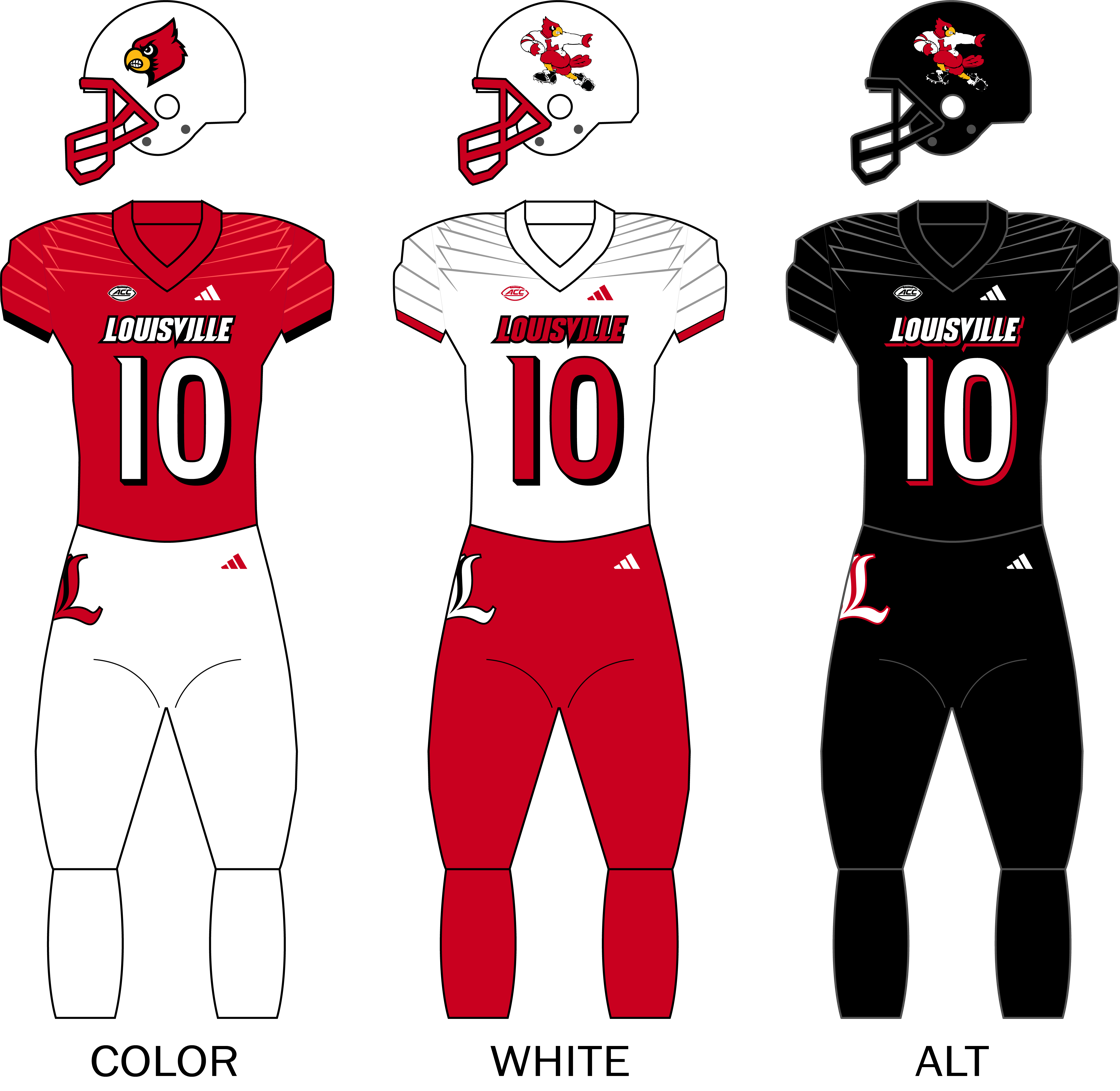

2024 Atlantic Coast Conference football standings
	Conf.			Overall
Team	W		L	W		L
No. 12 SMU y^	8	–	0	11	–	3
No. 14 Clemson y$^	7	–	1	10	–	4
No. 18 Miami (FL)	6	–	2	10	–	3
No. 20 Syracuse	5	–	3	10	–	3
Duke	5	–	3	9	–	4
Louisville	5	–	3	9	–	4
Georgia Tech	5	–	3	7	–	6
Boston College	4	–	4	7	–	6
Virginia Tech	4	–	4	6	–	7
Pittsburgh	3	–	5	7	–	6
NC State	3	–	5	6	–	7
North Carolina	3	–	5	6	–	7
Virginia	3	–	5	5	–	7
California	2	–	6	6	–	7
Wake Forest	2	–	6	4	–	8
Stanford	2	–	6	3	–	9
Florida State	1	–	7	2	–	10
Championship: Clemson 34, SMU 31
^ – College Football Playoff participant; $ – Conference champion; y – Championship game participant; Rankings from AP Poll

The 2024 Louisville Cardinals football team represented the University of Louisville as a member of the Atlantic Coast Conference (ACC) during the 2024 NCAA Division I FBS football season. The Cardinals were led by second-year head coach Jeff Brohm and played home games at the L&N Stadium located in Louisville, Kentucky.

In part due to a tougher schedule, Louisville regressed in Brohms' second year and finished 8–4 in the regular season with a 5–3 conference record. All four loses came by one score and all but one to playoff contenders. Louisville lost on the road at national title runner-up, 14–2 Notre Dame, at home to ACC runner-up, 11–3 SMU, and to 10–3 Miami, who was the second team out of the playoff field. Louisville's final loss came by upset to 3–9 Stanford on a late field goal.

In their ninth game, Louisville went on the road and upset #11 Clemson 33–21. This was Louisville's first ever win against Clemson and snapped the Tigers 22 game win streak in home night games. Clemson went on to win the ACC and make a playoff appearance.

The Cardinals went on the road to rival Kentucky and won 41–14, snapping a 5-game losing streak in the series. Louisville went on to defeat Washington in the 2024 Sun Bowl to finish the season with a 9–4 record.

== Offseason ==
=== Players leaving for NFL ===
Louisville had four players chosen in the 2024 NFL draft. Five other players were signed as undrafted free agents.

==== NFL draftees ====
Round	Pick	Player	Position	NFL club
4	129	Isaac Guerendo	RB	San Francisco 49ers
5	146	Jarvis Brownlee Jr.	CB	Tennessee Titans
5	156	Jamari Thrash	WR	Cleveland Browns
5	205	Jawhar Jordan	RB	Houston Texans

==== Undrafted free agents ====
Player	Position	NFL club	Reference
Jack Plummer	QB	Carolina Panthers	
Bryan Hudson	C	Detroit Lions	
Storm Duck	CB	Miami Dolphins	
Eric Miller	OT	Cincinnati Bengals	
Willie Tyler	OT	New York Jets	

== Preseason ==
=== ACC media poll ===
The Atlantic Coast Conference preseason poll was released on July 31. Louisville was predicted to finish fifth in the conference.

== Schedule ==
Date	Time	Opponent	Rank	Site	TV	Result	Attendance
August 31	12:00 p.m.	Austin Peay*		L&N Federal Credit Union Stadium; Louisville, KY	ACCN	W 62–0	47,067
September 7	3:30 p.m.	Jacksonville State*	No. 22	L&N Federal Credit Union Stadium; Louisville, KY	ACCNX/ESPN+	W 49–14	48,575
September 21	3:30 p.m.	Georgia Tech	No. 19	L&N Federal Credit Union Stadium; Louisville, KY	ESPN2	W 31–19	50,727
September 28	3:30 p.m.	at No. 16 Notre Dame*	No. 15	Notre Dame Stadium; Notre Dame, IN	Peacock	L 24–31	77,622
October 5	12:00 p.m.	SMU	No. 22	L&N Federal Credit Union Stadium; Louisville, KY	ESPN	L 27–34	50,254
October 12	3:30 p.m.	at Virginia		Scott Stadium; Charlottesville, VA	ACCN	W 24–20	32,688
October 19	12:00 p.m.	No. 6 Miami (FL)		L&N Federal Credit Union Stadium; Louisville, KY (rivalry)	ABC	L 45–52	59,115
October 25	7:30 p.m.	at Boston College		Alumni Stadium; Chestnut Hill, MA	ESPN2	W 31–27	42,887
November 2	7:30 p.m.	at No. 11т Clemson		Memorial Stadium; Clemson, SC	ESPN	W 33–21	80,446
November 16	3:30 p.m.	at Stanford	No. 19	Stanford Stadium; Stanford, CA	ACCN	L 35–38	18,685
November 23	4:00 p.m.	Pittsburgh		L&N Federal Credit Union Stadium; Louisville, KY	ESPN2	W 37–9	49,441
November 30	12:00 p.m.	at Kentucky*		Kroger Field; Lexington, KY (Governor's Cup)	SECN	W 41–14	58,612
December 31	2:00 p.m.	vs. Washington*		Sun Bowl; El Paso, TX (Sun Bowl)	CBS	W 35–34	40,826
*Non-conference game; Rankings from AP Poll (and CFP Rankings, after November 5) - Released prior to game; All times are in Eastern time

== Roster ==
2024 Louisville Cardinals football team roster
Players
Coaches
Offense

Pos.	#	Name	Class
WR	0	Chris Bell	Jr
WR	1	Ja'Corey Brooks	Sr
WR	2	Jadon Thompson	Sr
RB	4	Maurice Turner	Jr
WR	5	Caullin Lacy	Sr
QB	6	Evan Conley	GS
WR	7	Jimmy Calloway	Jr
QB	9	Tyler Shough	Sr
QB	10	Pierce Clarkson	Fr
TE	11	Jamari Johnson	Fr
QB	12	Brady Allen	So
QB	13	Deuce Adams	Fr
QB	14	Sam Vaulton	Jr
QB	15	Harrison Bailey	Sr
QB	17	Travis Egan	Fr
QB	18	Sam Young	Jr
WR	19	Drew Allen	Fr
QB	20	Ryan Zimmerman	Fr
RB	21	Donald Chaney	Jr
RB	22	Keyjuan Brown	Fr
WR	24	Ahmari Huggins-Bruce	Sr
RB	25	Isaac Brown	Fr
RB	26	Duke Watson	Fr
RB	30	Kaden Moorman	So
WR	33	Anderson Mitchell	Fr
WR	39	Trey Durbin	Fr
RB	43	Shammai Gates	Fr
WR	44	Eli Adams	Fr
TE	45	Duane Martin	Sr
WR	47	Jaedon King	Fr
WR	49	Kris Hughes	Fr
OL	50	Pete Nygra	Jr
OL	51	Austin Collins	Jr
OL	52	Fred Johnson	Fr
OL	53	Lance Robinson	Sr
OT	55	Jimmy Williams III	Fr
OL	56	Renato Brown	Sr
OL	59	Victor Cutler	Sr
OL	60	Rasheed Miller	Sr
OL	61	Ellis McAdoo	Fr
OL	66	James Glover-Tyson	Fr
OL	68	Michael Gonzalez	Sr
OL	70	Trevonte Sylvester	Jr
OL	71	Monroe Mills	Jr
OL	73	Madden Sanker	Fr
OL	76	Jonathan Mendoza	Sr
OL	77	Ransom McDermott	Fr
OL	78	Joe Crocker	Fr
OL	79	Makhete Gueye	So
WR	80	JoJo Stone	Fr
WR	81	Cataurus Hicks	Fr
WR	82	Jahlil McClain	Fr
TE	83	Mark Redman	Sr
TE	84	Izayah Cummings	Jr
TE	85	Nate Kurisky	So
WR	86	Antonio Meeks	Jr
TE	87	Dylan Mesman	Fr
TE	88	Jaleel Skinner	So
WR	89	Shaun Boykins	Fr
TE	90	Hamilton Atkins	Fr

Defense

Pos.	#	Name	Class
DB	3	Quincy Riley	Sr
LB	6	Stanquan Clark	So
DL	9	Ashton Gillotte	Sr
DB	10	Benjamin Perry	Jr
DB	12	Tamarion McDonald	Sr
DB	13	Aaron Williams	Fr
DB	14	Corey Thornton	Sr
LB	15	Dan Foster Jr.	Sr
LB	18	T. J. Capers	Fr
DL	19	Tramel Logan	Sr
DB	20	Tayon Holloway	So
DB	21	D'Angelo Hutchinson	Jr
DB	23	Tahveon Nicholson	Sr
DB	26	M. J. Griffin	Sr
DB	27	Devin Neal	Sr
DB	28	Daeh McCullough	Fr
DB	29	Blake Ruffin	Jr
DB	30	Rae'mon Mosby	Fr
DB	31	Jathan Hatch	Fr
LB	32	Jurriente Davis	Sr
DL	33	Myles Jernigan	Sr
LB	34	T. J. Quinn	Jr
LB	35	Antonio Watts	Jr
DB	36	Destin Cheirs	Fr
DB	40	Jaiden Spearman	Fr
DL	41	Ramon Puryear	Sr
DB	42	Jaden Minkins	Fr
LB	43	Trent Carter	Fr
DL	44	Selah Brown	Jr
LB	46	Brady McEnaney	Fr
DB	48	Dakadrien Saunders	Jr
DB	49	Eli Limouris	Fr
DL	50	Thor Griffith	Sr
LB	51	Jake Scianna	Fr
DL	52	Saadiq Clements	Fr
LB	53	Drew Covington	Fr
LB	54	Jaxon Panariello	Fr
DL	55	William Spencer	Fr
LB	57	M.J. Campbell	Fr
DL	58	Xavier Porter	Fr
DL	90	Rene Konga	Sr
DL	91	Richard Kinley	Sr
DL	92	Micah Carter	Fr
DL	93	Jared Dawson	Jr
DL	94	Jordan Guerad	Sr
DL	95	Mason Reiger	Sr
DL	97	Maurice Davis	Fr
DL	98	Adonijah Green	Fr
DL	99	Dezmond Tell	Sr

Special teams

Pos.	#	Name	Class
LS	32	Hayden Travelstead	Fr
K	36	Cooper Ranvier	Fr
K, P	37	A.J. Vinatieri	So
K	38	Brock Travelstead	Sr
P	39	Carter Schwartz	Fr
LS	48	Shai Kochav	Jr
P	90	Adam Winkenhofer	Fr
P	93	Brady Hodges	Sr
K	98	Nick Keller	So

Head coach

- Jeff Brohm

Coordinators/assistant coaches

- Brian Brohm – Offensive coordinator/Quarterbacks
- Mark Hagen – Co-defensive coordinator/Defensive linemen
- Ron English – Co-defensive coordinator/Secondary
- Karl Maslowski – Special teams coordinator/Linebackers
- Chris Barclay – Running backs
- Steve Ellis – Cornerbacks
- Mark Ivey – Linebackers
- Garrick McGee – Wide receivers
- Richard Owens – Offensive lineman
- Ryan Wallace – Tight ends
- Domenic Reno – Director, strength and conditioning
- Brison Manor – Assistant, strength and conditioning
- Geoff Stanford – Assistant, strength and conditioning
- Noah Fisher – Graduate assistant
- Me'Leick Miles – Graduate assistant

Legend

- (C) Team captain
- (S) Suspended
- (I) Ineligible
- Injured
- Redshirt

Roster
Last update: 02/21/25

== Game summaries ==
=== vs. Austin Peay (FCS) ===
Louisville Cardinals (0–0) vs. Austin Peay Governors (0–0) – Game summary

Quarter	1	2	3	4	Total
Austin Peay	0	0	0	0	0
Louisville	10	28	21	3	62

at L&N Stadium • Louisville, Kentucky

- Date: August 31, 2024
- Game time: 12:00 p.m. EST
- Game attendance: 47,067
- TV announcers (ACC Network): Jorge Sedano (play-by-play), Orlando Franklin (analyst), and Morgan Uber (sideline)

Game information

First quarter

- (10:48) LOU – Brock Travelstead 30-yard field goal (Drive: 7 plays, 62 yards, 4:12; Louisville 3–0)
- (8:10) LOU – Ja'Corey Brooks 9-yard pass from Tyler Shough (Brock Travelstead kick) (Drive: 5 plays, 33 yards, 1:36; Louisville 10–0)

Second quarter

- (14:51) LOU – Keyjuan Brown 4-yard run (Brock Travelstead kick) (Drive: 9 plays, 54 yards, 5:07; Louisville 17–0)
- (10:55) LOU – Jadon Thompson 33-yard pass from Tyler Shough (Brock Travelstead kick) (Drive: 5 plays, 90 yards, 1:56; Louisville 24–0)
- (7:17) LOU – Mark Redman 21-yard pass from Tyler Shough (Brock Travelstead kick) (Drive: 3 plays, 35 yards, 1:27; Louisville 31–0)
- (0:10) LOU – Jadon Thompson 5-yard pass from Tyler Shough (Brock Travelstead kick) (Drive: 2 plays, 13 yards, 0:15; Louisville 38–0)

Third quarter

- (8:04) LOU – Isaac Brown 77-yard run (Brock Travelstead kick) (Drive: 1 play, 77 yards, 0:15; Louisville 45–0)
- (2:39) LOU – Ramon Puryear 0-yard fumble recovery (Cooper Ranvier kick) (Louisville 52–0)
- (0:17) LOU – Duke Watson 7-yard run (Nick Keller kick) (Drive: 3 plays, 24 yards, 1:12; Louisville 59–0)

Fourth quarter

- (5:00) LOU – Brock Travelstead 38-yard field goal (Drive: 11 plays, 59 yards, 6:53; Louisville 62–0)

Statistics	APSU	LOU
First downs	9	23
Total yards	106	571
Rushing yards	34	293
Passing yards	72	278
Passing: Comp–Att–Int	14–24–1	27–34–0
Time of possession	29:10	30:50

Team	Category	Player	Statistics
Austin Peay	Passing	Austin Smith	11–16, 53 yards, INT
Austin Peay	Rushing	Lavell Wright	7 carries, 23 yards
Austin Peay	Receiving	Jaden Barnes	3 receptions, 30 yards
Louisville	Passing	Tyler Shough	18–24, 232 yards, 4 TD
Louisville	Rushing	Isaac Brown	5 carries, 123 yards, TD
Louisville	Receiving	Ja'Corey Brooks	7 receptions, 83 yards, TD

=== vs. Jacksonville State ===
No. 22 Louisville Cardinals (1–0) vs. Jacksonville State Gamecocks (0–1) – Game summary

Quarter	1	2	3	4	Total
Jacksonville State	0	14	0	0	14
No. 22 Louisville	14	14	7	14	49

at L&N Stadium • Louisville, Kentucky

- Date: September 7, 2024
- Game time: 3:30 p.m. EST
- Game weather: Sunny • Temperature: 72 °F (22 °C) • Wind: N 12 mph
- Game attendance: 48,575
- Referee: Gary Peterson
- TV announcers (ACCNX/ESPN+): Justin Kutcher (play-by-play) and Charles Arbuckle (analyst)

Game information

First quarter

- (10:29) LOU – Donald Chaney 10-yard run (Brock Travelstead kick) (Drive: 9 plays, 62 yards, 4:26; Louisville 7–0)
- (3:57) LOU – Keyjuan Brown 22-yard run (Brock Travelstead kick) (Drive: 3 plays, 52 yards, 1:24; Louisville 14–0)

Second quarter

- (14:24) JVST – Sean Brown 11-yard pass from Tyler Huff (Garrison Rippa kick) (Drive: 11 plays, 75 yards, 4:34; Louisville 14–7)
- (9:47) LOU – Maurice Turner 1-yard run (Brock Travelstead kick) (Drive: 9 plays, 70 yards, 4:33; Louisville 21–7)
- (2:37) LOU – Duane Martin 2-yard run (Brock Travelstead kick) (Drive: 7 plays, 80 yards, 3:47; Louisville 28–7)
- (0:36) JVST – Tyler Huff 15-yard run (Garrison Rippa kick) (Drive: 6 plays, 75 yards, 2:01; Louisville 28–14)

Third quarter

- (8:58) LOU – Chris Bell 48-yard pass from Tyler Shough (Brock Travelstead kick) (Drive: 8 plays, 77 yards, 4:26; Louisville 35–14)

Fourth quarter

- (7:43) LOU – Mark Redman 12-yard pass from Tyler Shough (Brock Travelstead kick) (Drive: 11 plays, 96 yards, 7:01; Louisville 42–14)
- (1:50) LOU – Duke Watson 40-yard run (Brock Travelstead kick) (Drive: 6 plays, 79 yards, 3:48; Louisville 49–14)

Statistics	JVST	LOU
First downs	19	29
Total yards	290	610
Rushing yards	130	233
Passing yards	160	377
Passing: Comp–Att–Int	17–28–1	23–35–0
Time of possession	23:37	36:23

Team	Category	Player	Statistics
Jacksonville State	Passing	Tyler Huff	17–27, 160 yards, TD, INT
Jacksonville State	Rushing	Tyler Huff	18 carries, 101 yards, TD
Jacksonville State	Receiving	Michael Pettway	4 receptions, 30 yards
Louisville	Passing	Tyler Shough	21–33, 349 yards, 2 TD
Louisville	Rushing	Maurice Turner	12 carries, 60 yards, TD
Louisville	Receiving	Ja'Corey Brooks	6 receptions, 89 yards

=== vs. Georgia Tech ===
No. 19 Louisville Cardinals (2–0) vs. Georgia Tech Yellow Jackets (3–1) – Game summary

Quarter	1	2	3	4	Total
Georgia Tech	7	7	3	2	19
No. 19 Louisville	7	10	7	7	31

at L&N Stadium • Louisville, Kentucky

- Date: September 21, 2024
- Game time: 3:30 p.m. EST
- Game attendance: 50,727
- TV announcers (ESPN2): Mike Monaco (play-by-play), Kirk Morrison (analyst), and Dawn Davenport (sideline reporter)

Game information

First quarter

- (7:40) GT – Haynes King 23-yard run (Aidan Birr kick) (Drive: 6 plays, 65 yards, 2:34; Georgia Tech 7–0)
- (2:11) LOU – Ramon Puryear 0-yard fumble recovery (Brock Travelstead kick) (Tied 7–7)

Second quarter

- (11:20) LOU – Chris Bell 37-yard pass from Tyler Shough (Brock Travelstead kick) (Drive: 7 plays, 71 yards, 3:30; Louisville 14–7)
- (1:56) LOU – Brock Travelstead 27-yard field goal (Drive: 11 plays, 75 yards, 7:10; Louisville 17–7)
- (0:04) GT – Jamal Haynes 1-yard run (Aidan Birr kick) (Drive: 10 plays, 75 yards, 1:52; Louisville 17–14)

Third quarter

- (2:46) GT – Aidan Birr 26-yard field goal (Drive: 13 plays, 67 yards, 7:22; Tied 17–17)
- (1:43) LOU – Ja'Corey Brooks 57-yard pass from Tyler Shough (Brock Travelstead kick) (Drive: 3 plays, 75 yards, 1:03; Louisville 24–17)

Fourth quarter

- (11:23) GT – Team safety (Louisville 24–19)
- (7:05) LOU – Tayon Holloway 55-yard return of blocked field goal (Brock Travelstead kick) (Louisville 31–19)

Statistics	GT	LOU
First downs	18	14
Total yards	410	326
Rushing yards	98	57
Passing yards	312	269
Passing: Comp–Att–Int	21–32–0	13–19–0
Time of possession	31:50	28:10

Team	Category	Player	Statistics
Georgia Tech	Passing	Haynes King	21–32, 312 yards
Georgia Tech	Rushing	Haynes King	14 carries, 58 yards, TD
Georgia Tech	Receiving	Malik Rutherford	7 receptions, 113 yards
Louisville	Passing	Tyler Shough	13–19, 269 yards, 2 TD
Louisville	Rushing	Donald Chaney	10 carries, 23 yards
Louisville	Receiving	Ja'Corey Brooks	4 receptions, 125 yards, TD

=== at No. 16 Notre Dame ===
No. 15 Louisville Cardinals (3–0) at No. 16 Notre Dame Fighting Irish (3–1) – Game summary

Quarter	1	2	3	4	Total
No. 15 Louisville	7	7	0	10	24
No. 16 Notre Dame	21	3	0	7	31

at Notre Dame Stadium • Notre Dame, Indiana

- Date: September 28, 2024
- Game time: 3:30 p.m. EST
- Game weather: Temperature: 72 °F (22 °C) •Wind: NE 11 MPH • Weather: Cloudy
- Game attendance: 77,622
- Referee: Mike Roche
- TV announcers (Peacock): Paul Burmeister (play-by-play), Jason Garrett (analyst), and Zora Stephenson (sideline)

Game information

First quarter

- (13:30) LOU – Isaac Brown 10-yard pass from Tyler Shough, Brock Travelstead kick (Drive: 3 plays, 24 yards, 1:24; Louisville 7–0)
- (7:22) ND – Jeremiyah Love 46-yard field goal (Drive: 9 plays, 47 yards, 4:28; Tied 3–3)
- (4:59) ND – Jaden Greathouse 34-yard pass from Riley Leonard, Mitch Jeter kick (Drive: 12 plays, 53 yards, 2:05; Notre Dame 14–7)
- (2:40) ND – Riley Leonard 4-yard run, Mitch Jeter kick (Drive: 1 play, 4 yards, 0:03; Notre Dame 21–7)

Second quarter

- (12:28) LOU – J'Corey Brooks 5-yard pass from Tyler Shough, Brock Travelstead kick (Drive: 3 plays, 9 yards, 1:30; Notre Dame 21–14)
- (3:46) ND – Mitch Jeter 48-yard field goal (Drive: 4 plays, 6 yards, 2:14; Notre Dame 24–14)

Third quarter

No scoring plays this quarter

Fourth quarter

- (11:25) LOU – Brock Travelstead 56-yard field goal (Drive: 7 plays, 17 yards, 2:04; Notre Dame 24–17)
- (9:16) ND – Jeremiyah Love 32-yard pass from Riley Leonard, Mitch Jeter kick (Drive: 5 plays, 75 yards, 2:09; Notre Dame 31–17)
- (5:17) LOU – Ja'Corey Brooks 24-pass from Tyler Shough (Drive: 14 plays, 75 yards, 3:59; Notre Dame 31–24)

Statistics	LOU	ND
First downs	19	11
Total yards	395	280
Rushing yards	35–131	31–163
Passing yards	264	163
Passing: Comp–Att–Int	24–41–1	17–23–0
Time of possession	32:05	27:55

Team	Category	Player	Statistics
Louisville	Passing	Tyler Shough	24/41, 264 yards, 3 TD, INT
Louisville	Rushing	Isaac Brown	13 carries, 72 yards
Louisville	Receiving	Ja'Corey Brooks	5 receptions, 71 yards, 2 TD
Notre Dame	Passing	Riley Leonard	17/23, 163 yards, 2 TD
Notre Dame	Rushing	Riley Leonard	13 carries, 52 yards, TD
Notre Dame	Receiving	Jaden Greathouse	4 receptions, 61 yards, TD

=== vs. SMU ===
No. 22 Louisville Cardinals (3–1) vs. SMU Mustangs (4–1) – Game summary

Quarter	1	2	3	4	Total
SMU	14	10	3	7	34
No. 22 Louisville	10	3	14	0	27

at L&N Stadium • Louisville, Kentucky

- Date: October 5, 2024
- Game time: 12:00 p.m. EST
- Game weather: Sunny • Temperature: 76 °F (24 °C) • Wind: SE 3 mph
- Game attendance: 50,254
- Referee: Justin Elliott
- TV announcers (ESPN): Bob Wischusen (play-by-play), Louis Riddick (analyst), and Kris Budden (sideline reporter)

Game information

First quarter

- (11:39) SMU – Roderick Daniels Jr. 5-yard run (Collin Rogers kick) (Drive: 8 plays, 75 yards, 3:21; SMU 7–0)
- (9:00) LOU – Ja'Corey Brooks 6-yard pass from Tyler Shough (Brock Travelstead kick) (Drive: 5 plays, 65 yards, 2:39; Tied 7–7)
- (6:24) SMU – Key'Shawn Smith 10-yard pass from Preston Stone (Collin Rogers kick) (Drive: 6 plays, 75 yards, 2:36; SMU 14–7)
- (2:51) LOU – Brock Travelstead 46-yard field goal (Drive: 8 plays, 46 yards, 3:27; SMU 14–10)

Second quarter

- (6:51) SMU – Kevin Jennings 59-yard run (Collin Rogers kick) (Drive: 5 plays, 78 yards, 2:15; SMU 21–10)
- (2:23) LOU – Brock Travelstead 41-yard field goal (Drive: 10 plays, 36 yards, 4:17; SMU 21–13)
- (0:17) SMU – Collin Rogers 55-yard field goal (Drive: 10 plays, 37 yards, 2:06; SMU 24–13)

Third quarter

- (9:56) LOU – Donald Chaney 1-yard run (Brock Travelstead kick) (Drive: 8 plays, 78 yards, 4:56; SMU 24–20)
- (7:19) SMU – Collin Rogers 43-yard field goal (Drive: 6 plays, 49 yards, 2:37; SMU 27–20)
- (5:40) LOU – Ja'Corey Brooks 86-yard pass from Tyler Shough (Brock Travelstead kick) (Drive: 3 plays, 90 yards, 1:33; Tied 27–27)

Fourth quarter

- (6:39) SMU – L. J. Johnson Jr. 1-yard run (Collin Rogers kick) (Drive: 11 plays, 89 yards, 3:23; SMU 34–27)

Statistics	SMU	LOU
First downs	26	21
Total yards	481	461
Rushing yards	190	132
Passing yards	291	329
Passing: Comp–Att–Int	22–28–0	22–35–1
Time of possession	25:37	34:23

Team	Category	Player	Statistics
SMU	Passing	Kevin Jennings	21/27, 281 yards
SMU	Rushing	Kevin Jennings	10 carries, 113 yards, TD
SMU	Receiving	R. J. Maryland	6 receptions, 83 yards
Louisville	Passing	Tyler Shough	22/35, 329 yards, 2 TD, INT
Louisville	Rushing	Isaac Brown	10 carries, 117 yards
Louisville	Receiving	Ja'Corey Brooks	3 receptions, 121 yards, 2 TD

=== at Virginia ===
Louisville Cardinals (3–2) at Virginia Cavaliers (4–1) – Game summary

Quarter	1	2	3	4	Total
Louisville	0	7	10	7	24
Virginia	7	0	6	7	20

at Scott Stadium • Charlottesville, Virginia

- Date: October 12, 2024
- Game time: 3:30 p.m. EST
- Game weather: Sunny • Temperature: 83 °F (28 °C) • Wind: SW 5 mph
- Game attendance: 32,688
- TV announcers (ACCN): Chris Cotter (play-by-play), Mark Herzlich (analyst) and Coley Harvey (sideline)

Game information

First quarter

- (9:39) UVA – Grady Brosterhous 1-yard run (Will Bettridge kick) (Drive: 11 plays, 75 yards, 5:21; Virginia 7–0)

Second quarter

- (10:59) LOU – Isaac Brown 7-yard run (Brock Travelstead kick) (Drive: 6 plays, 72 yards, 2:16; Tied 7–7)

Third quarter

- (12:38) LOU – Brock Travelstead 31-yard field goal (Drive: 8 plays, 67 yards, 2:17; Louisville 10–7)
- (10:40) LOU – Isaac Brown 14-yard run (Brock Travelstead kick) (Drive: 1 play, 14 yards, 0:06; Louisville 17–7)
- (5:26) UVA – Will Bettridge 31-yard field goal (Drive: 12 plays, 62 yards, 5:14; Louisville 17–10)
- (1:00) UVA – Will Bettridge 23-yard field goal (Drive: 10 plays, 54 yards, 3:26; Louisville 17–13)

Fourth quarter

- (10:03) UVA – Xavier Brown 46-yard pass from Anthony Colandrea (Will Bettridge kick) (Drive: 4 plays, 77 yards, 1:44; Virginia 20–17)
- (1:55) LOU – Jamari Johnson 5-yard pass from Tyler Shough (Brock Travelstead kick) (Drive: 11 plays, 67 yards, 4:38; Louisville 24–20)

Statistics	LOU	UVA
First downs	18	22
Total yards	408	449
Rushing yards	177	148
Passing yards	231	301
Passing: Comp–Att–Int	18–31–1	27–46–0
Time of possession	25:16	34:44

Team	Category	Player	Statistics
Louisville	Passing	Tyler Shough	18–31, 231 yards, TD, INT
Louisville	Rushing	Isaac Brown	20 carries, 146 yards, 2 TD
Louisville	Receiving	Ja'Corey Brooks	5 receptions, 83 yards
Virginia	Passing	Anthony Colandrea	26–45, 279 yards, TD
Virginia	Rushing	Anthony Colandrea	15 carries, 84 yards
Virginia	Receiving	Malachi Fields	9 receptions, 129 yards

=== vs. No. 6 Miami (FL) ===
Louisville Cardinals (4–2) vs. No. 6 Miami Hurricanes (6–0) – Game summary

Quarter	1	2	3	4	Total
No. 6 Miami (FL)	10	14	14	14	52
Louisville	7	10	14	14	45

at L&N Stadium • Louisville, Kentucky

- Date: October 19, 2024
- Game time: 12:00 p.m. EST
- Game attendance: 59,115
- TV announcers (ABC): Joe Tessitore (play-by-play), Jordan Rodgers (analyst), and Stormy Buonantony (sideline)

Game information

First quarter

- (8:34) MIA – Andres Borregales 55-yard field goal (Drive: 12 plays, 34 yards, 5:10; Miami 3–0)
- (7:15) LOU – Isaac Brown 43-yard run, Brock Travelstead kick (Drive: 3 plays, 68 yards, 1:19; Louisville 7–3)
- (5:05) MIA – Jacolby George 27-yard pass form Cam Ward, Andres Borregales kick (Drive: 5 plays, 70 yards, 2:10; Miami 10–7)

Second quarter

- (14:49) MIA – Samuel Brown 49-yard pass from Cam Ward, Andres Borregales kick (Drive: 4 plays, 79 yards, 1:17; Miami 17–7)
- (10:32) LOU – Mark Redman 3-yard pass from Tyler Slough, Brock Travelstead kick (Drive: 9 plays, 75 yards, 4:00; Miami 17–14)
- (5:01) MIA – Raul Aguirre Jr. 3-yard fumble return, Andres Borregales kick (Miami 24–14)
- (0:00) LOU – Brock Travelstead 22-yard field goal (Drive: 8 plays, 65 yards, 0:57; Miami 24–17)

Third quarter

- (8:21) MIA – Xavier Restrepo 9-yard pass from Cam Ward, Andres Borregales kick (Drive: 14 plays, 75 yards, 6:39; Miami 31–17)
- (8:06) LOU – Caullin Lacy 100-yard kickoff return, Brock Travelstead kick (Miami 31–24)
- (6:59) LOU – Ja'Corey Brooks 21-yard pass from Tyler Slough, Brock Travelstead kick (Drive: 3 plays, 26 yards, 0:59; Tied 31–31)
- (3:19) MIA – Isaiah Horton 2-yard run pass from Cam Ward, Andres Borregales kick (Drive: 6 plays, 75 yards, 3:40; Miami 38–31)

Fourth quarter

- (13:32) LOU – Duke Watson 4-yard pass from Tyler Slough, Brock Travelstead kick (Drive: 13 plays, 75 yards, 4:57; Tied 38–38)
- (11:17) MIA – Ajay Allen 2-yard run, Andres Borregales kick (Drive: 5 plays, 80 yards, 2:05; Miami 45–38)
- (4:05) MIA – Damien Martinez 30-yard run, Andres Borregales kick (Drive: 11 plays, 80 yards, 6:11; Miami 52–38)
- (0:54) LOU – Ja'Corey Brooks 4-yard pass from Tyler Slough, Brock Travelstead kick (Drive: 13 plays, 77 yards, 3:11; Miami 52–45)

Statistics	MIA	LOU
First downs	27	24
Total yards	538	448
Rushing yards	219	106
Passing yards	319	342
Passing: Comp–Att–Int	21–32–0	31–51–0
Time of possession	34:18	25:42

Team	Category	Player	Statistics
Miami (FL)	Passing	Cam Ward	21–32, 319 yards, 4 TD
Miami (FL)	Rushing	Damien Martinez	12 carries, 89 yards, TD
Miami (FL)	Receiving	Samuel Brown	3 receptions, 125 yards, TD
Louisville	Passing	Tyler Shough	31–51, 342 yards, 4 TD
Louisville	Rushing	Isaac Brown	9 carries, 56 yards, TD
Louisville	Receiving	Ja'Corey Brooks	6 receptions, 107 yards, 2 TD

=== at Boston College ===
Louisville Cardinals (4–3) at Boston College Eagles (4–3) – Game summary

Quarter	1	2	3	4	Total
Louisville	0	7	10	14	31
Boston College	7	13	7	0	27

at Alumni Stadium • Chestnut Hill, Massachusetts

- Date: October 25, 2024
- Game time: 7:30 p.m. EST
- Game weather: Clear, 52 °F (11 °C)
- Game attendance: 42,887
- Referee: Nate Black
- TV announcers (ESPN2): Anish Shroff (play-by-play), Andre Ware (analyst), and Morgan Uber (sideline)

Game information

First quarter

- (7:26) BC – Kamari Morales 54-yard pass from Thomas Castellanos (Liam Connor kick) (Drive: 4 plays, 56 yards, 1:42; Boston College 7–0)

Second quarter

- (10:24) BC – Treshaun Ward 4-yard pass from Thomas Castellanos (Liam Connor kick) (Drive: 10 plays, 61 yards, 4:31; Boston College 14–0)
- (6:30) BC – Kye Robichaux 4-yard run (Liam Connor PAT failed) (Drive: 7 plays, 46 yards, 3:21; Boston College 20–0)
- (1:17) LOU – Isaac Brown 4-yard run (Brock Travelstead kick) (Drive: 10 plays, 76 yards, 5:07; Boston College 20–7)

Third quarter

- (10:42) LOU – Brock Travelstead 23-yard field goal (Drive: 11 plays, 69 yards, 4:10; Boston College 20–10)
- (7:58) BC – Jeremiah Franklin 6-yard pass from Thomas Castellanos (Liam Connor kick) (Drive: 5 plays, 74 yards, 2:37; Boston College 27–10)
- (3:50) LOU – Nate Kurisky 4-yard pass from Tyler Shough (Brock Travelstead kick) (Drive: 9 plays, 83 yards, 4:03; Boston College 27–17)

Fourth quarter

- (10:57) LOU – Isaac Brown 18-yard run (Brock Travelstead kick) (Drive: 4 plays, 42 yards, 1:41; Boston College 27–24)
- (7:12) LOU – Nate Kurisky 6-yard pass from Tyler Shough (Brock Travelstead kick) (Drive: 4 plays, 63 yards, 1:51; Louisville 31–27)

Statistics	LOU	BC
First downs	24	14
Total yards	461	318
Rushing yards	129	154
Passing yards	332	164
Passing: Comp–Att–Int	28–38–2	13–28–0
Time of possession	30:09	29:51

Team	Category	Player	Statistics
Louisville	Passing	Tyler Shough	28–38, 332 yards, 2 TD, 2 INT
Louisville	Rushing	Isaac Brown	18 carries, 85 yards, 2 TD
Louisville	Receiving	Ja'Corey Brooks	8 receptions, 120 yards
Boston College	Passing	Thomas Castellanos	13–28, 164 yards, 3 TD
Boston College	Rushing	Treshaun Ward	13 carries, 64 yards
Boston College	Receiving	Treshaun Ward	3 receptions, 81 yards, TD

=== at No. 11т Clemson ===
Louisville Cardinals (5–3) at No. 11т Clemson Tigers (6–1) – Game summary

Quarter	1	2	3	4	Total
Louisville	3	14	9	7	33
No. 11т Clemson	7	0	0	14	21

at Memorial Stadium • Clemson, South Carolina

- Date: November 2, 2024
- Game time: 7:30 p.m. EST
- Game weather: Sunny • Temperature: 68 °F (20 °C) • Wind: NE 5 mph
- Game attendance: 80,446
- TV announcers (ESPN): Bob Wischusen (play-by-play), Louis Riddick (analyst), and Kris Budden (sideline)

Game information

First quarter

- (4:39) LOU – Brock Travelstead 21-yard field goal (Drive: 7 plays, 60 yards, 1:51; Louisville 3–0)
- (0:16) CLEM – Antonio Williams 12-yard pass from Cade Klubnik (Nolan Hauser kick) (Drive: 11 plays, 75 yards, 4:23; Clemson 7–3)

Second quarter

- (5:42) LOU – Tyler Shough 4-yard run (Brock Travelstead kick) (Drive: 7 plays, 92 yards, 2:53; Louisville 10–7)
- (0:43) LOU – Keyjuan Brown 1-yard run (Brock Travelstead kick) (Drive: 6 plays, 47 yards, 1:00; Louisville 17–7)

Third quarter

- (11:45) LOU – Brock Travelstead 42-yard field goal (Drive: 10 plays, 50 yards, 3:15; Louisville 20–7)
- (6:47) LOU – Brock Travelstead 40-yard field goal (Drive: 8 plays, 37 yards, 3:25; Louisville 23–7)
- (3:53) LOU – Brock Travelstead 49-yard field goal (Drive: 4 plays, 1 yard, 1:00; Louisville 26–7)

Fourth quarter

- (6:00) CLEM – Phil Mafah 3-yard run (Nolan Hauser kick) (Drive: 16 plays, 61 yards, 5:01; Louisville 26–14)
- (5:50) LOU – Isaac Brown 45-yard run (Brock Travelstead kick) (Drive: 1 play, 45 yards, 0:10; Louisville 33–14)
- (2:07) CLEM – Phil Mafah 1-yard run (Nolan Hauser kick) (Drive: 12 plays, 75 yards, 3:43; Louisville 33–21)

Statistics	LOU	CLEM
First downs	19	31
Total yards	366	450
Rushing yards	210	222
Passing yards	156	228
Passing: Comp–Att–Int	17–32–0	33–56–0
Time of possession	22:08	37:52

Team	Category	Player	Statistics
Louisville	Passing	Tyler Shough	17–32, 156 yards
Louisville	Rushing	Isaac Brown	20 carries, 151 yards, TD
Louisville	Receiving	Ja'Corey Brooks	4 receptions, 42 yards
Clemson	Passing	Cade Klubnik	33–56, 228 yards, TD
Clemson	Rushing	Phil Mafah	30 carries, 171 yards, 2 TD
Clemson	Receiving	T. J. Moore	5 receptions, 63 yards

=== at Stanford ===
No. 19 Louisville Cardinals (6–3) at Stanford Cardinal (2–7) – Game summary

Quarter	1	2	3	4	Total
No. 19 Louisville	7	14	7	7	35
Stanford	10	3	8	17	38

at Stanford Stadium • Stanford, California

- Date: November 16, 2024
- Game time: 3:30 p.m. EST
- Game attendance: 18,685
- TV announcers (ACCN): Jorge Sedano (play-by-play), Orlando Franklin (analyst) and Morgan Uber (sideline)

Game information

First quarter

- (7:59) STAN – Emmet Kenney 41-yard field goal (Drive: 4 plays, 1 yard, 0:48; Stanford 3–0)
- (6:12) STAN – Emmett Mosley V 62-yard pass from Ashton Daniels (Emmet Kenney kick) (Drive: 1 play, 62 yards, 0:11; Stanford 10–0)
- (1:11) LOU – Donald Chaney 1-yard run (Brock Travelstead kick) (Drive: 6 plays, 43 yards, 2:32; Stanford 10–7)

Second quarter

- (6:56) STAN – Emmet Kenney 24-yard field goal (Drive: 15 plays, 74 yard, 9:11; Stanford 13–7)
- (4:06) LOU – Duke Watson 5-yard run (Brock Travelstead kick) (Drive: 7 plays, 65 yards, 2:50; Louisville 14–13)
- (0:49) LOU – Chris Bell 10-yard pass from Tyler Shough (Brock Travelstead kick) (Drive: 7 plays, 53 yards, 1:26; Louisville 21–13)

Third quarter

- (4:48) LOU – Duke Watson 68-yard run (Brock Travelstead kick) (Drive: 1 play, 68 yards, 0:11; Louisville 28–13)
- (0:07) STAN – Elic Ayomanor 13-yard pass from Ashton Daniels (Ashton Daniels run for 2-pt conversion) (Drive: 8 plays, 80 yards, 4:39; Louisville 28–21)

Fourth quarter

- (9:44) LOU – Duke Watson 5-yard run (Brock Travelstead kick) (Drive: 11 plays, 77 yards, 5:16; Louisville 35–21)
- (6:37) STAN – Emmett Mosley V 4-yard pass from Ashton Daniels (Emmet Kenney kick) (Drive: 6 plays, 75 yards, 3:07; Louisville 35–28)
- (0:45) STAN – Emmett Mosley V 25-yard pass from Justin Lamson (Emmet Kenney kick) (Drive: 9 plays, 76 yards, 3:18; Tied 35–35)
- (0:00) STAN – Emmet Kenney 52-yard field goal (Drive: 2 plays, 21 yards, 0:04; Stanford 38–35)

Statistics	LOU	STAN
First downs	21	22
Total yards	432	406
Rushing yards	162	83
Passing yards	270	323
Passing: Comp–Att–Int	26–40–1	23–34–1
Time of possession	24:53	35:07

Team	Category	Player	Statistics
Louisville	Passing	Tyler Shough	26–39, 270 yards, TD, INT
Louisville	Rushing	Duke Watson	11 carries, 117 yards, 3 TD
Louisville	Receiving	Chris Bell	9 receptions, 112 yards, TD
Stanford	Passing	Ashton Daniels	22–33, 298 yards, 3 TD, INT
Stanford	Rushing	Cole Tabb	11 carries, 35 yards
Stanford	Receiving	Emmett Mosley V	13 receptions, 168 yards, 3 TD

=== vs. Pittsburgh ===
Louisville Cardinals (6–4) vs. Pittsburgh Panthers (7–3) – Game summary

Quarter	1	2	3	4	Total
Pittsburgh	0	0	7	2	9
Louisville	10	17	10	0	37

at L&N Stadium • Louisville, Kentucky

- Date: November 23, 2024
- Game time: 4:00 p.m. EST
- Game weather: Cloudy • Temperature: 43 °F (6 °C) • Wind: SW 7 mph
- Game attendance: 49,441
- TV announcers (ESPN2): Mike Couzens (play-by-play), Brock Osweiler (analyst) and Stormy Buonantony (sideline reporter)

Game information

First quarter

- (6:35) LOU – Brock Travelstead 41-yard field goal (Drive: 10 plays, 57 yards, 5:19; Louisville 3–0)
- (1:54) LOU – Isaac Brown 1-yard run (Brock Travelstead kick) (Drive: 5 plays, 82 yards, 2:18; Louisville 10–0)

Second quarter

- (12:33) LOU – Ja'Corey Brooks 15-yard pass from Tyler Shough (Brock Travelstead kick) (Drive: 6 plays, 50 yards, 2:22; Louisville 17–0)
- (3:58) LOU – Isaac Brown 15-yard run (Brock Travelstead kick) (Drive: 1 plays, 15 yards, 0:08; Louisville 24–0)
- (0:05) LOU – Brock Travelstead 36-yard field goal (Drive: 10 plays, 42 yards, 2:03; Louisville 27–0)

Third quarter

- (13:58) LOU – Chris Bell 68-yard pass from Tyler Shough (Brock Travelstead kick) (Drive: 3 plays, 75 yards, 1:02; Louisville 34–0)
- (3:58) PITT – Konata Mumpfield 8-yard pass from Nate Yarnell (Ben Sauls kick) (Drive: 8 plays, 75 yards, 2:37; Louisville 34–7)
- (0:24) LOU – Brock Travelstead 40-yard field goal (Drive: 8 plays, 37 yards, 3:34; Louisville 37–7)

Fourth quarter

- (12:32) PITT – Team safety (Louisville 37–9)

Statistics	PITT	LOU
First downs	17	26
Total yards	265	505
Rushing yards	75	212
Passing yards	190	293
Passing: Comp–Att–Int	19–35–3	17–28–0
Time of possession	25:34	34:26

Team	Category	Player	Statistics
Pittsburgh	Passing	Nate Yarnell	11–23, 96 yards, TD, INT
Pittsburgh	Rushing	Desmond Reid	19 carries, 59 yards
Pittsburgh	Receiving	Konata Mumpfield	4 receptions, 51 yards, TD
Louisville	Passing	Tyler Shough	17–28, 293 yards, 2 TD
Louisville	Rushing	Isaac Brown	13 carries, 93 yards, 2 TD
Louisville	Receiving	Chris Bell	2 receptions, 101 yards, TD

=== at Kentucky (Governor's Cup) ===
Louisville Cardinals (7–4) at Kentucky Wildcats (4–7) – Game summary

Quarter	1	2	3	4	Total
Louisville	7	13	14	7	41
Kentucky	0	0	7	7	14

at Kroger Field • Lexington, Kentucky

- Date: November 30, 2024
- Game time: 12:00 p.m. EST
- Game attendance: 58,612
- TV announcers (SEC Network): Dave Neal (play-by-play), Aaron Murray (analyst) and Ashley ShahAhmadi (sideline)

Game information

First quarter

- (7:07) LOU – Isaac Brown 1-yard run (Brock Travelstead kick) (Drive: 9 plays, 60 yards, 4:02; Louisville 7–0)

Second quarter

- (13:00) LOU – Brock Travelstead 20-yard field goal (Drive: 4 plays, 22 yards, 1:53; Louisville 10–0)
- (11:16) LOU – Duke Watson 58-yard run (Brock Travelstead kick) (Drive: 1 play, 58 yards, 0:09; Louisville 17–0)
- (4:45) LOU – Brock Travelstead 21-yard field goal (Drive: 10 plays, 72 yards, 4:51; Louisville 20–0)

Third quarter

- (9:22) UK – Ja'Mori Maclin 4-yard pass from Gavin Wimsatt (Alex Raynor kick) (Drive: 7 plays, 73 yards, 3:54; Louisville 20–7)
- (4:59) LOU – Ramon Puryear 20-yard fumble return (Brock Travelstead kick) (Louisville 27–7)
- (0:43) LOU – Duke Watson 24-yard run (Brock Travelstead kick) (Drive: 6 plays, 60 yards, 3:21; Louisville 34–7)

Fourth quarter

- (9:49) UK – Ja'Mori Maclin 83-yard pass from Gavin Wimsatt (Alex Raynor kick) (Drive: 3 plays, 95 yards, 1:28; Louisville 34–14)
- (9:01) LOU – Isaac Brown 67-yard run (Brock Travelstead kick) (Drive: 2 plays, 75 yards, 0:48; Louisville 41–14)

Statistics	LOU	UK
First downs	23	13
Total yards	486	328
Rushing yards	358	155
Passing yards	128	173
Passing: Comp–Att–Int	9–18–0	10–24–3
Time of possession	35:03	24:57

Team	Category	Player	Statistics
Louisville	Passing	Tyler Shough	9–18, 128 yards
Louisville	Rushing	Isaac Brown	26 carries, 178 yards, 2 TD
Louisville	Receiving	Chris Bell	3 receptions, 84 yards
Kentucky	Passing	Gavin Wimsatt	4–9, 125 yards, 2 TD, INT
Kentucky	Rushing	Jamarion Wilcox	12 carries, 66 yards
Kentucky	Receiving	Ja'Mori Maclin	3 receptions, 121 yards, 2 TD

=== vs. Washington (Sun Bowl) ===
Louisville Cardinals (8–4) vs. Washington Huskies (6–6) – Game summary

Quarter	1	2	3	4	Total
Louisville	14	7	14	0	35
Washington	7	14	0	13	34

at Sun Bowl • El Paso, Texas

- Date: December 31, 2024
- Game time: 2:00 p.m. EST
- Game weather: Sunny • Temperature: 62 °F (17 °C) • Wind: 3 mph (4.8 km/h) SE
- Game attendance: 40,826
- TV announcers (CBS): Brad Nessler (play-by-play), Gary Danielson (analyst), and Jenny Dell (sideline)

Game information

First quarter

- (12:15) LOU – Tahveon Nicholson 21-yard interception return (Brock Travelstead kick) (Louisville 7–0)
- (8:09) WASH – Giles Jackson 40-yard pass from Demond Williams Jr. (Grady Gross kick) (Drive: 3 plays, 57 yards, 1:29; Tied 7–7)
- (0:27) LOU – Caullin Lacy 9-yard pass from Harrison Bailey (Brock Travelstead kick) (Drive: 5 plays, 32 yards, 2:50; Louisville 14–7)

Second quarter

- (8:10) WASH – Giles Jackson 49-yard pass from Demond Williams Jr. (Grady Gross kick) (Drive: 1 play, 49 yards, 0:07; Tied 14–14)
- (4:34) LOU – Antonio Meeks 28-yard pass from Harrison Bailey (Brock Travelstead kick) (Drive: 7 plays, 79 yards, 3:25; Louisville 21–14)
- (0:51) WASH – Demond Williams Jr. 7-yard run (Grady Gross kick) (Drive: 10 plays, 75 yards, 3:43; Tied 21–21)

Third quarter

- (4:46) LOU – Nate Kurisky 21-yard pass from Harrison Bailey (Brock Travelstead kick) (Drive: 10 plays, 87 yards, 5:19; Louisville 28–21)
- (2:07) LOU – Caullin Lacy 8-yard run (Brock Travelstead kick) (Drive: 2 plays, 62 yards, 0:52; Louisville 35–21)

Fourth quarter

- (3:42) WASH – Giles Jackson 31-yard pass from Demond Williams Jr. (Grady Gross kick) (Drive: 13 plays, 97 yards, 6:10; Louisville 35–28)
- (0:09) WASH – Giles Jackson 1-yard pass from Demond Williams Jr. (2-pt conversion failed) (Drive: 11 plays, 62 yards, 2:29; Louisville 35–34)

Statistics	LOU	WASH
First downs	15	20
Total yards	371	472
Rushing yards	207	98
Passing yards	164	374
Passing: Comp–Att–Int	16–25–0	26–32–1
Time of possession	28:24	31:36

Team	Category	Player	Statistics
Louisville	Passing	Harrison Bailey	16–25, 164 yards, 3 TD
Louisville	Rushing	Isaac Brown	18 carries, 99 yards
Louisville	Receiving	Chris Bell	6 receptions, 60 yards
Washington	Passing	Demond Williams Jr.	26–32, 374 yards, 4 TD, INT
Washington	Rushing	Demond Williams Jr.	20 carries, 48 yards, TD
Washington	Receiving	Giles Jackson	11 receptions, 161 yards, 4 TD

== Awards and honors ==
Individual Awards
Player	Position	Award	Ref.
Isaac Brown	RB	ACC Rookie of the Year	
Isaac Brown	RB	ACC Offensive Rookie of the Year	

All-ACC
Player	Position	Team
Ja'Corey Brooks	WR	First Team
Isaac Brown	RB	Second Team
Ashton Gillotte	DE	Second Team
Quincy Riley	CB	Second Team
Tyler Shough	QB	Honorable Mention
Monroe Mills	OL	Honorable Mention
Michael Gonzalez	OL	Honorable Mention
Pete Nygra	C	Honorable Mention
Ramon Puryear	DL	Honorable Mention
Stanquan Clark	LB	Honorable Mention
Corey Thornton	CB	Honorable Mention
Brock Travelstead	K	Honorable Mention

== Rankings ==
Ranking movements Legend: ██ Increase in ranking ██ Decrease in ranking — = Not ranked RV = Received votes
	Week																
Poll	Pre	1	2	3	4	5	6	7	8	9	10	11	12	13	14	15	Final
AP	RV	22	19	19	15	22	RV	RV	—	RV	25	22	RV	RV	RV	RV	RV
Coaches	RV	24	21	20	17	22	RV	RV	—	RV	RV	24	RV	RV	RV	RV	RV
CFP	Not released										22	19	—	—	—	—	Not released
