= 2024 Sun Bowl =

American college football game

2024 Tony the Tiger Sun Bowl
- 91st Sun Bowl
Louisville Cardinals	Washington Huskies
(8–4)	(6–6)
ACC	Big Ten
35	34
Head coach: Jeff Brohm	Head coach: Jedd Fisch
	1	2	3	4	Total
Louisville	14	7	14	0	35
Washington	7	14	0	13	34
- Date: December 31, 2024
- Season: 2024
- Stadium: Sun Bowl
- Location: El Paso, Texas
- MVP: Harrison Bailey (QB, Louisville)
- Referee: Hank Johns (Big 12)
- Attendance: 40,826

United States TV coverage
- Network: CBS
- Announcers: Brad Nessler (play-by-play), Gary Danielson (analyst), and Jenny Dell (sideline)

The 2024 Sun Bowl was a college football bowl game played on December 31, 2024, at the Sun Bowl in El Paso, Texas. The 91st annual Sun Bowl game featured the Louisville Cardinals from the Atlantic Coast Conference and the Washington Huskies from the Big Ten Conference. The game began at approximately 12:00 p.m. MST and aired on CBS. The Sun Bowl was one of the 2024–25 bowl games concluding the 2024 FBS football season. The bowl game was sponsored by Kellogg's Frosted Flakes breakfast cereal. The game was officially known as the Tony the Tiger Sun Bowl, named after Tony the Tiger, mascot of title sponsor Kellogg's Frosted Flakes breakfast cereal.

== Teams ==
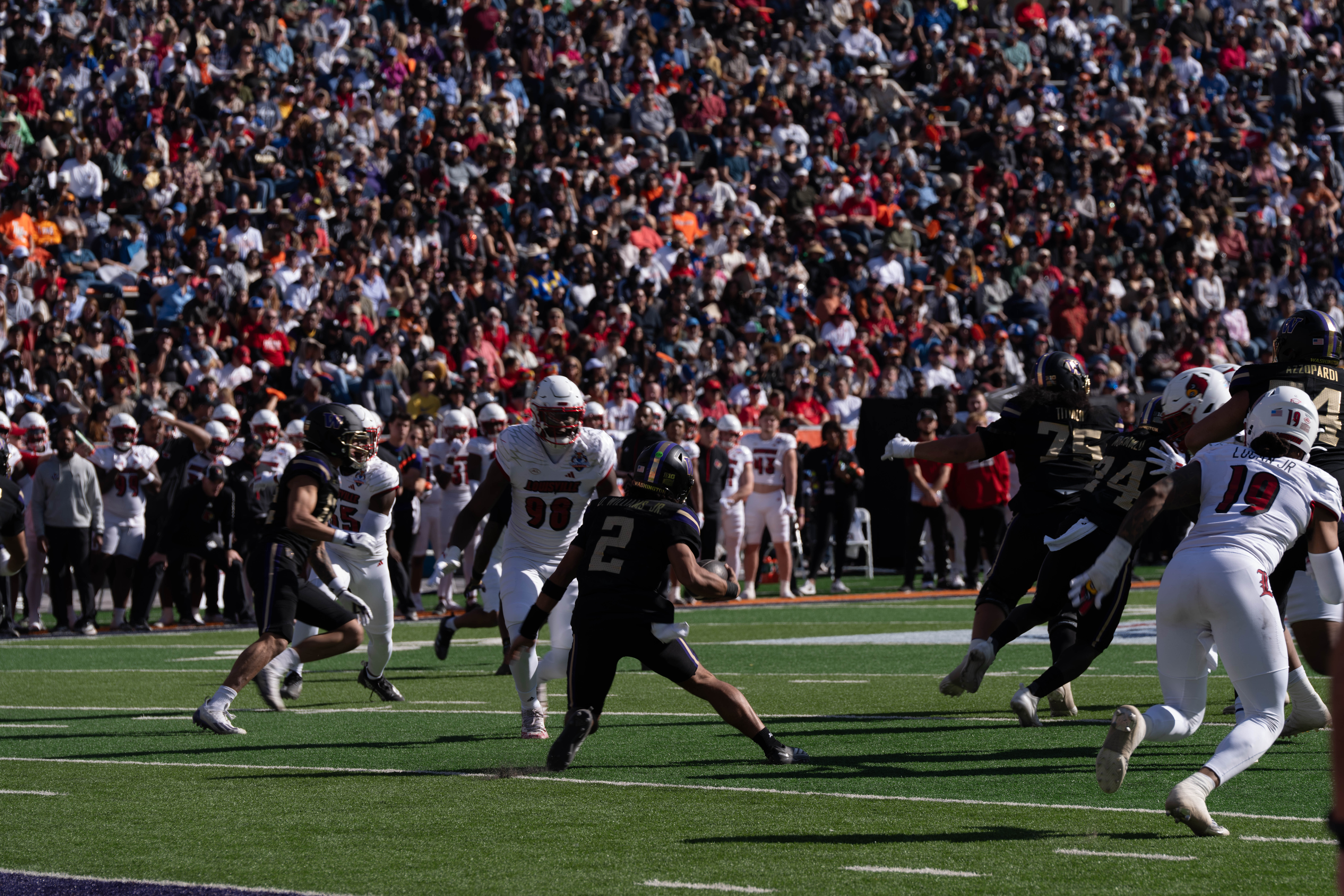
Demond Williams Jr. carries the ball during the 2024 Sun Bowl

The bowl featured the Louisville Cardinals of the Atlantic Coast Conference and the Washington Huskies of the Big Ten Conference; Washington was selected due to being a former Pac-12 Conference school.

This was the first ever meeting between Louisville and Washington.

=== Louisville Cardinals ===
The Cardinals entered the game with an 8–4 record (5–3 in the ACC), tied for fourth place in their conference.

This was Louisville's second Sun Bowl; the Cardinals previously won the 1958 edition against Drake.

=== Washington Huskies ===
The Huskies entered the game with a 6–6 record (4–5 in the Big Ten), tied for ninth place in their conference.

This was Washington's fifth Sun Bowl; the Huskies were 1–3 in their 4 previous appearances, winning in 1979 and losing in 1986, 1995, and 2002.

== Game summary ==
2024 Tony the Tiger Sun Bowl

Quarter	1	2	3	4	Total
Louisville	14	7	14	0	35
Washington	7	14	0	13	34

at Sun Bowl • El Paso, Texas

- Date: December 31, 2024
- Game time: 12:10 p.m. MST
- Game weather: Sunny • Temperature: 62 °F (17 °C) • Wind: 3 mph (4.8 km/h) southeast
- Game attendance: 40,826
- Referee: Hank Johns
- TV announcers (CBS): Brad Nessler (play-by-play), Gary Danielson (analyst), and Jenny Dell (sideline)
- Box score

Game information

First quarter

- (12:15) LOU – Tahveon Nicholson 21-yard interception return (Brock Travelstead kick) (Louisville 7–0)
- (8:09) WASH – Giles Jackson 40-yard pass from Demond Williams Jr. (Grady Gross kick) (Drive: 3 plays, 57 yards, 1:29; Tied 7–7)
- (0:27) LOU – Caullin Lacy 9-yard pass from Harrison Bailey (Brock Travelstead kick) (Drive: 5 plays, 32 yards, 2:50; Louisville 14–7)

Second quarter

- (8:10) WASH – Giles Jackson 49-yard pass from Demond Williams Jr. (Grady Gross kick) (Drive: 1 play, 49 yards, 0:07; Tied 14–14)
- (4:34) LOU – Antonio Meeks 28-yard pass from Harrison Bailey (Brock Travelstead kick) (Drive: 7 plays, 79 yards, 3:25; Louisville 21–14)
- (0:51) WASH – Demond Williams Jr. 7-yard run (Grady Gross kick) (Drive: 10 plays, 75 yards, 3:43; Tied 21–21)

Third quarter

- (4:46) LOU – Nate Kurisky 21-yard pass from Harrison Bailey (Brock Travelstead kick) (Drive: 10 plays, 87 yards, 5:19; Louisville 28–21)
- (2:07) LOU – Caullin Lacy 8-yard run (Brock Travelstead kick) (Drive: 2 plays, 62 yards, 0:52; Louisville 35–21)

Fourth quarter

- (3:42) WASH – Giles Jackson 31-yard pass from Demond Williams Jr. (Grady Gross kick) (Drive: 13 plays, 97 yards, 6:10; Louisville 35–28)
- (0:09) WASH – Giles Jackson 1-yard pass from Demond Williams Jr. (2-pt conversion failed) (Drive: 11 plays, 62 yards, 2:29; Louisville 35–34)

=== Statistics ===
Statistics	LOU	UW
First downs	15	20
Plays–yards	371	472
Rushes–yards	207	36
Passing yards	164	374
Passing: comp–att–int	16–25–0	26–32–1
Time of possession	28:24	31:36

Team	Category	Player	Statistics
Louisville	Passing	Harrison Bailey	16–25, 164 yards, 3 TD
Louisville	Rushing	Isaac Brown	18 carries, 99 yards
Louisville	Receiving	Chris Bell	6 receptions, 60 yards
Washington	Passing	Demond Williams Jr.	26–32, 374 yards, 4 TD, INT
Washington	Rushing	Demond Williams Jr.	20 carries, 48 yards, TD
Washington	Receiving	Giles Jackson	11 receptions, 161 yards, 4 TD
