= Ja'Corey Brooks =

American football player (born 2001)

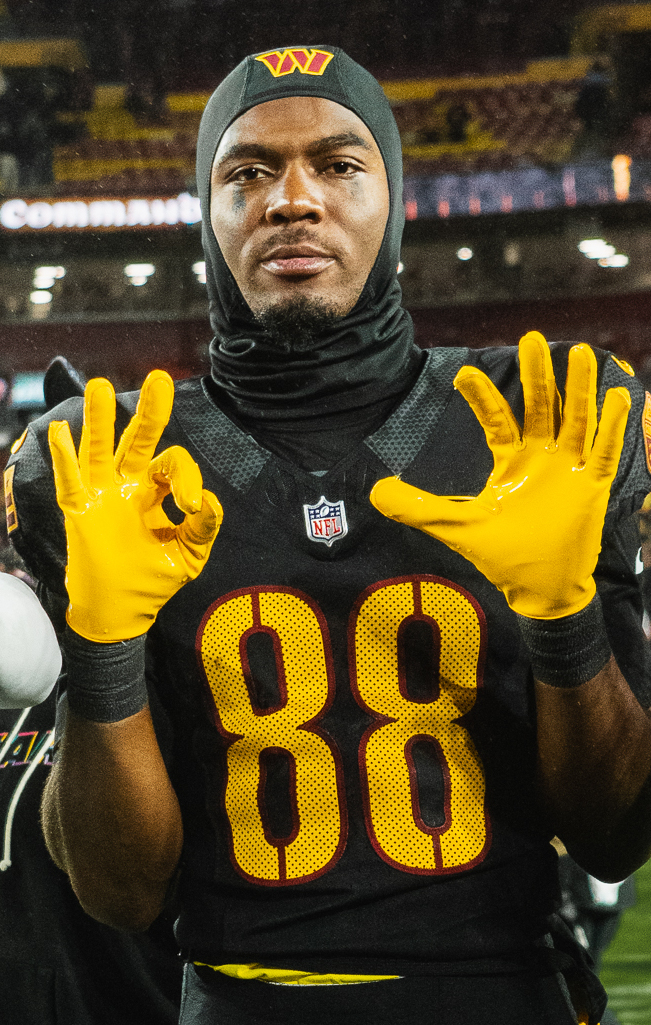
- Brooks with the Washington Commanders in 2025

Profile
- Position: Wide receiver

Personal information
- Born: October 31, 2001 (age 25); Miami, Florida, U.S.
- Listed height: 6 ft 3 in (1.91 m)
- Listed weight: 195 lb (88 kg)

Career information
- High school: IMG Academy (Bradenton, Florida)
- College: Alabama (2021–2023); Louisville (2024)
- NFL draft: 2025: undrafted

Career history
- Washington Commanders (2025)

Awards and highlights
- First-team All-ACC (2024)
- Stats at Pro Football Reference

Ja'Corey Brooks (born October 31, 2001) is an American professional football wide receiver. Brooks played college football for the Alabama Crimson Tide and Louisville Cardinals and signed with the Washington Commanders as an undrafted free agent in 2025.

== Early life ==
Brooks was born on October 31, 2001, in Miami, Florida. He initially attended Booker T. Washington Senior High School, catching 99 passes for 1,281 yards and 18 touchdowns as junior en route to a state championship. After the season, Brooks transferred to IMG Academy in Bradenton, Florida. Brooks committed to play college football at Alabama.

== College career ==
Brooks mostly saw playing time on special teams as a freshman with the Alabama Crimson Tide. He caught a nine-yard pass for his first collegiate reception in Alabama's 59–3 win over New Mexico State Aggies on November 13, 2021. Brooks saw his first significant playing time against Auburn and caught two passes for 49 yards and a touchdown in Alabama's 24–22 overtime win. He started in place of injured receiver John Metchie III in the 2021 Cotton Bowl Classic against Cincinnati and had four receptions for 66 yards and a touchdown in a 27–6 win. In 2022, Brooks played in all 13 games, starting eight, recording 39 receptions for 674 yards and eight touchdowns. He also recorded a blocked punt on special teams.

Brooks suffered a torn labrum during training camp in fall 2023, an injury that ended his season prematurely after only eight games and three receptions. On December 15, 2023, Brooks announced that he would be transferring to Louisville. Brooks had his best statistical season catching 61 passes for 1,013 yards and 9 touchdowns, and received First Team All-ACC honors.

College statistics
Season	Games		Receiving			
Season	GP	GS	Rec	Yds	Avg	TD
2021	15	2	15	192	12.8	2
2022	13	8	39	674	17.2	8
2023	8	0	3	30	10.0	0
2024	12	12	61	1,013	16.6	9
Career	48	22	118	1,909	16.1	19

== Professional career ==
Pre-draft measurables
Height	Weight	Arm length	Hand span	Wingspan	40-yard dash	10-yard split	20-yard split	20-yard shuttle	Three-cone drill	Vertical jump	Broad jump	Bench press
6 ft 2 in (1.88 m)	184 lb (83 kg)	31 3/4 in (0.81 m)	9 in (0.23 m)	6 ft 4 3/4 in (1.95 m)	4.68 s	1.56 s	2.47 s	4.35 s	7.18 s	30.0 in (0.76 m)	9 ft 8 in (2.95 m)	12 reps
All values from NFL Combine/Pro Day

Brooks signed with the Washington Commanders as an undrafted free agent on May 8, 2025. He was waived by the team on August 26, and was re-signed to their practice squad the following day. On November 29, the Commanders placed Brooks on the practice squad injured list. He signed a reserve/futures contract with the Commanders on January 5, 2026. Brooks was released by Washington on June 2.
