= Harrison Bailey =

American football player (born 2001)

Profile
- Position: Quarterback

Personal information
- Born: November 1, 2001 (age 25); Marietta, Georgia, U.S.
- Listed height: 6 ft 4.25 in (1.94 m)
- Listed weight: 237 lb (108 kg)

Career information
- High school: Marietta
- College: Tennessee (2020–2021); UNLV (2022); Louisville (2023–2024); Florida (2025)
- Stats at ESPN

Harrison Clay Bailey (born November 1, 2001) is an American former college football quarterback. He played for the Tennessee Volunteers, UNLV Rebels, Louisville Cardinals, and Florida Gators.

== Early life ==
Bailey attended Marietta High School. As a senior, Bailey threw for 50 touchdowns and 10 interceptions on 411 attempts for 4,674 yards. He led his team to a 14–2 record and a state championship. Bailey was rated as a 4-star recruit and was ranked 99th in his class. Bailey chose to go to Tennessee over Alabama, Georgia, and Ohio State. He enrolled at Tennessee in January 2020.

== College career ==
=== Tennessee ===
Bailey appeared in six games in his freshman season. He made his first start against Florida on December 5, 2020. In this game, the Gators defeated Bailey and the Volunteers 31–19. In this game Bailey threw for one touchdown and was 14 for 21 passing. The following week, Bailey earned his first win as a starter against rival Vanderbilt. He passed for 207 yards and two touchdowns in the 42–17 victory. As a starter, Bailey went 1–2. He passed for 578 yards, four touchdowns, and two interceptions on the 2020 season.

Tennessee head coach Jeremy Pruitt was fired during the offseason bringing in new head coach Josh Heupel. The coaching change brought transfers Hendon Hooker and Joe Milton to Tennessee. Bailey was the backup and played in one game against Tennessee Tech. On October 27, 2021, Bailey announced his decision to transfer.

=== UNLV ===
On January 19, 2022, Bailey announced he would be transferring to UNLV. On November 26, Bailey threw for 209 yards and two touchdowns against Nevada, leading UNLV to a 27–22 victory; he entered the game after an injury to starting quarterback Doug Brumfield. He finished the season throwing for 318 yards and two touchdowns in six appearances. On April 17, 2023, Bailey announced his decision to enter the transfer portal for the second time.

=== Louisville ===
On May 25, 2023, Bailey announced he would be transferring to Louisville as a preferred walk-on. He appeared in one game in the 2023 season. He threw a touchdown against Murray State on September 7. Bailey spent the 2024 season as the backup to Tyler Shough. Prior to the 2024 Sun Bowl, Shough opted out and Bailey was named the Cardinals starter. In his first start with Louisville, he threw for 164 yards and three touchdowns in a 35–34 victory over Washington. For his performance, he was named the game's MVP. After the game, Bailey announced that he would enter the transfer portal for the third time.

=== Florida ===
On January 20, 2025, Bailey announced that he would transfer to Florida.

=== Statistics ===
Season	Team	Games			Passing								Rushing			
Season	Team	GP	GS	Record	Comp	Att	Pct	Yards	Avg	TD	Int	Rate	Att	Yards	Avg	TD
2020	Tennessee	6	3	1−2	48	68	70.6	578	8.5	4	2	155.5	23	-28	-1.2	0
2021	Tennessee	1	0	0−0	3	7	42.9	16	2.3	0	0	62.1	4	8	2.0	1
2022	UNLV	6	0	0−0	30	58	51.7	318	5.5	2	1	105.7	15	-1	-0.1	1
2023	Louisville	1	0	0−0	3	5	60.0	51	10.2	1	0	211.7	0	0	0.0	0
2024	Louisville	4	1	1−0	24	33	72.7	227	6.9	3	0	160.5	2	17	8.5	0
2025	Florida	0	0	0−0	0	0	0.0	0	0.0	0	0	0.0	0	0	0.0	0
Career		18	4	2−2	108	171	63.2	1,190	7.0	10	3	137.4	44	-4	-0.1	2
