= Sebastian Valdez =

American football player (born 2002)

No. 55 – San Francisco 49ers
- Position: Defensive tackle
- Roster status: Active

Personal information
- Born: August 1, 2002 (age 24); San Diego, California, U.S.
- Listed height: 6 ft 3 in (1.91 m)
- Listed weight: 301 lb (137 kg)

Career information
- High school: Monte Vista (Spring Valley, California)
- College: Montana State (2021–2023); Washington (2024)
- NFL draft: 2025: undrafted

Career history
- San Francisco 49ers (2025–present)

Career NFL statistics as of Week 3, 2026
- Total tackles: 3
- Stats at Pro Football Reference

Sebastian Valdez (born August 1, 2002) is an American professional football defensive tackle for the San Francisco 49ers of the National Football League (NFL). He played college football for the Montana State Bobcats and Washington Huskies.

== Early life ==
Valdez attended Monte Vista High School in Spring Valley, California. He committed to play college football for the Montana State Bobcats.

== College career ==
=== Montana State ===
As a freshman in 2021, Valdez recorded 41 tackles with six and a half being for a loss, and three sacks. In week 3 of the 2022 season, he notched three tackles in a loss versus Oregon State. During the 2022 season, Valdez notched 44 tackles with ten being for a loss, seven sacks, two forced fumbles, and two fumble recoveries. In 2023, he recorded 40 tackles with eight and a half being for a loss, and five sacks. After the season, Valdez entered his name into the NCAA transfer portal. During his time as a Bobcat he earned both first and second-team All-Big Sky selections.

=== Washington ===
Valdez transferred to play for the Washington Huskies. During his one season as a Husky in 2024, Valdez notched 49 tackles, two sacks, and a pass deflection. After the season, he declared for the 2025 NFL draft.

== Professional career ==
Pre-draft measurables
Height	Weight	Arm length	Hand span	Wingspan	40-yard dash	10-yard split	20-yard split	20-yard shuttle	Three-cone drill	Vertical jump	Broad jump	Bench press
6 ft 3 3/8 in (1.91 m)	301 lb (137 kg)	31 1/4 in (0.79 m)	10 3/8 in (0.26 m)	6 ft 4 7/8 in (1.95 m)	5.02 s	1.72 s	2.84 s	4.46 s	7.38 s	27.5 in (0.70 m)	8 ft 10 in (2.69 m)	34 reps
All values from Pro Day

On April 26, 2025, Valdez signed an undrafted free agent contract with the San Francisco 49ers. He was waived by the 49ers on August 26, as a part of the team's final roster cuts; he was re-signed to the practice squad the following day.

On January 20, 2026, Valdez signed a reserve/futures contract with San Francisco. Valdez was waived by the 49ers on August 30 as a part of final roster cuts; he was re-signed to the team's practice squad the next day. He was promoted to the active roster on October 3.
