= Drew Azzopardi =

American football player (born 2004)

No. 74 – Washington Huskies
- Position: Offensive tackle
- Class: Junior

Personal information
- Born: August 14, 2004 (age 22); Burlingame, California, U.S.
- Listed height: 6 ft 7 in (2.01 m)
- Listed weight: 315 lb (143 kg)

Career information
- High school: Junípero Serra (San Mateo, California)
- College: San Diego State (2022–2023); Washington (2024–present)
- Stats at ESPN

Andrew Azzopardi (born August 14, 2004) is an American college football offensive tackle for the Washington Huskies. He previously played for the San Diego State Aztecs.

== Early life ==
Azzopardi attended high school at Junípero Serra located in San Mateo, California, where he held offers from schools such as Nevada and San Diego State. Ultimately, he committed to play college football for the San Diego State Aztecs.

== College career ==
=== San Diego State ===
During his first collegiate season in 2022, he played in just three games, using the season to redshirt. Heading into the 2023 season, Azzopardi was named a starter, where he appeared in 12 games, recording six starts. After the conclusion of the 2023 season, he decided to enter his name into the NCAA transfer portal.

=== Washington ===
Azzopardi transferred to play for the Washington Huskies. During the 2024 season, he earned a starting spot at right tackle, where he started all 13 games for the Huskies. Heading into the 2025 season, Azzopardi is once again projected to be a starter, where he will work to improve after allowing 29 pressures in 2024.
