= Tahveon Nicholson =

American football player (born 2000)

No. 3 – Louisville Cardinals
- Position: Cornerback
- Class: Junior

Personal information
- Born: January 31, 2000 (age 26)
- Listed height: 5 ft 10 in (1.78 m)
- Listed weight: 185 lb (84 kg)

Career information
- High school: Riverside (Jacksonville, Florida)
- College: Illinois (2020–2023); Louisville (2024–present)
- Stats at ESPN

Tahveon Nicholson (born January 31, 2000) is an American college football cornerback for the Louisville Cardinals. He previously played for the Illinois Fighting Illini.

== Early life ==
Nicholson attended Riverside High School. He was rated as a three-star recruit and committed to play college football for the Illinois Fighting Illini.

== College career ==
=== Illinois ===
In the 2021 season, Nicholson had two starts on the year where he made 11 tackles and two pass deflections. He entered the 2022 season as a starter for the Fighting Illini. In the 2022 season, Nicholson recorded his first career interception against Wisconsin. His season was shortened to just ten games after suffering a wrist injury versus Michigan State, finishing the 2022 campaign with 19 tackles with one being for a loss, six pass deflections, an interception, and a forced fumble in 10 starts. During the 2023 season, Nicholson totaled 36 tackles with two going for a loss, six pass deflections, a fumble recovery, and two forced fumbles. After the season, Nicholson entered the NCAA transfer portal.

Nicholson finished his career with the Fighting Illini with 66 tackles 14 pass deflections, an interception, and three forced fumbles.

=== Louisville ===
On December 9, 2023, Nicholson originally decided to transfer to play for the Ole Miss Rebels. However, he flipped his commitment to play for the Louisville Cardinals.

== Professional career ==
Pre-draft measurables
Height	Weight
5 ft 9 5/8 in (1.77 m)	185 lb (84 kg)
Values from Pro Day
