= 2025 UCF Knights football team =

American college football season

2025 UCF Knights football
- Conference: Big 12 Conference
- Record: 5–7 (2–7 Big 12)
- Head coach: Scott Frost (3rd season)
- Offensive coordinator: Steve Cooper (1st season)
- Offensive scheme: No-huddle spread option
- Defensive coordinator: Alex Grinch (1st season)
- Base defense: 3–4
- Home stadium: Acrisure Bounce House

Uniform
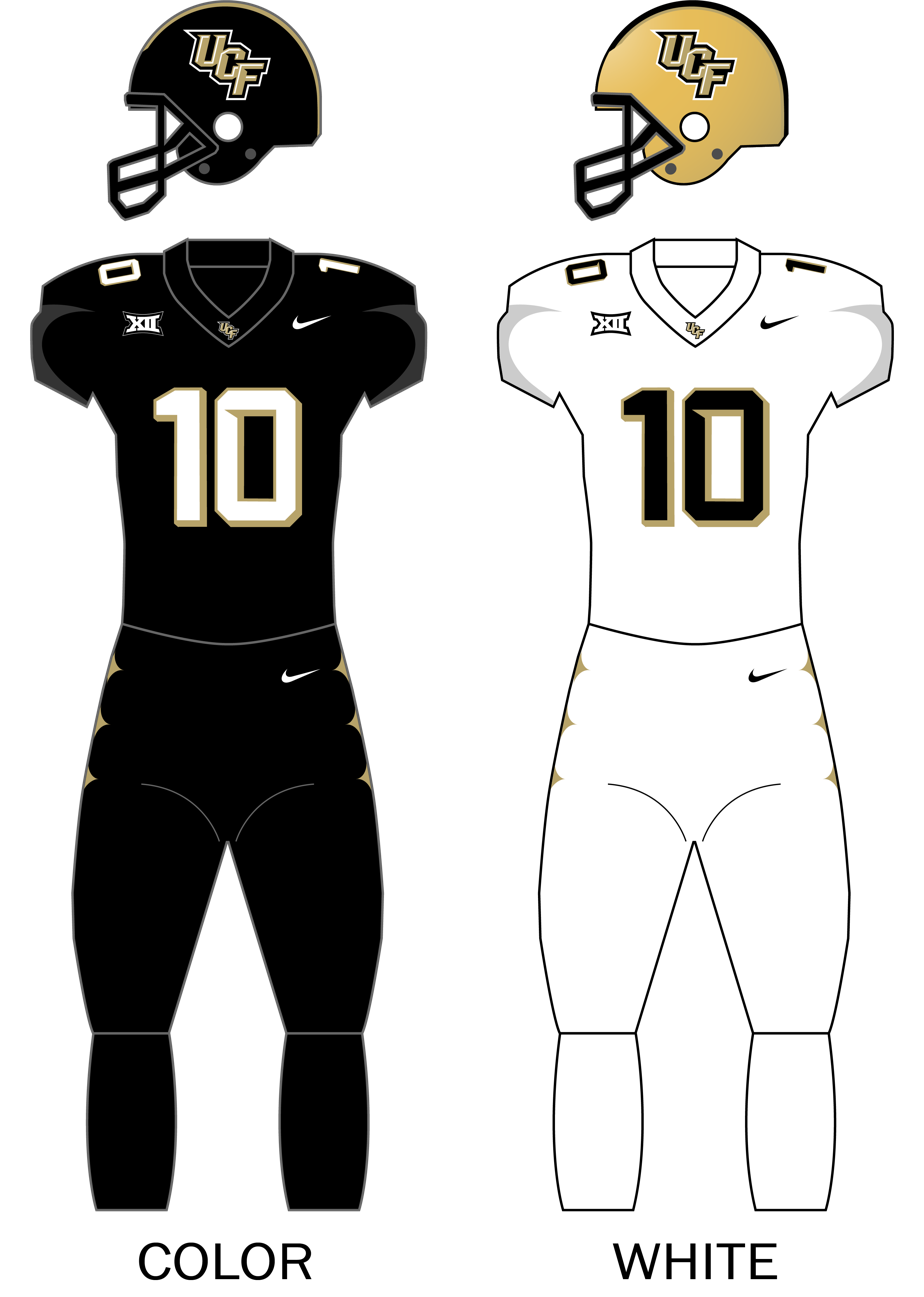

2025 Big 12 Conference football standings
	Conf.			Overall
Team	W		L	W		L
No. 7 Texas Tech y$^	8	–	1	12	–	2
No. 11 BYU y	8	–	1	12	–	2
No. 14 Utah	7	–	2	11	–	2
No. 22 Houston	6	–	3	10	–	3
Arizona	6	–	3	9	–	4
Arizona State	6	–	3	8	–	5
No. 25 TCU	5	–	4	9	–	4
Iowa State	5	–	4	8	–	4
Cincinnati	5	–	4	7	–	6
Kansas State	5	–	4	6	–	6
Baylor	3	–	6	5	–	7
Kansas	3	–	6	5	–	7
UCF	2	–	7	5	–	7
West Virginia	2	–	7	4	–	8
Colorado	1	–	8	3	–	9
Oklahoma State	0	–	9	1	–	11
Championship: Texas Tech 34, BYU 7
^ – College Football Playoff participant; $ – Conference champion; y – Championship game participant; Rankings from AP Poll

The 2025 UCF Knights football team represented the University of Central Florida (UCF) as a member of the Big 12 Conference during the 2025 NCAA Division I FBS football season. The Knights were led by third-year head coach Scott Frost in the first-year of his second stint. The Knights played their home games at Acrisure Bounce House, located in Orlando, Florida. (Note: The stadium and the UCF main campus have an Orlando mailing address, but both are located in unincorporated Orange County.)

After compiling a 28–24 record during four years as head coach, Gus Malzahn resigned on November 30, 2024 to take the offensive coordinator position at Florida State. One week later, after a brief coaching search, the university re-hired Scott Frost, who coached the Knights football team in 2016–2017.

Shawn Clark, previously the head coach of Appalachian State, joined the coaching staff as offensive line coach. On September 10, four days after the second game of the season, Clark was hospitalized after suffering a medical emergency. Clark died on September 21, 2025 at the age of 50. The team announced that they would wear an "SC" decal on their helmets for the remainder of the season.

The Knights saw huge roster turnover from the previous season, with no less than 70 new players for 2025, most from the transfer portal. Head coach Scott Frost began a rebuild with new players at almost every skill position. On August 25, former Marshall and FAU transfer Cam Fancher (a redshirt senior) was named the starting quarterback for Week 1. Fancher, however, suffered an injury in the first half of the first game, and Tayven Jackson would be named the starter for Week 2. Fancher, Jackson, Jacurri Brown and Davi Belfort all took snaps at quarterback, while Myles Montgomery and Jaden Nixon were the lead rushers with a combined 1,259 yards and 11 touchdowns. The Knights got off to a 3–0 start, but dropped seven of their last nine games to finish 5–7. Initially UCF was not bowl eligible, but due to their Academic Progress Rate (APR) they became eligible after multiple teams ahead of them opted out of postseason participation. The Knights, however, declined a possible invitation to the Birmingham Bowl, due to shortages on the depth chart.

The UCF Knights drew an average home attendance of 43,409.

== Schedule ==
Date	Time	Opponent	Site	TV	Result	Attendance
August 28	7:00 p.m.	Jacksonville State*	Acrisure Bounce House; Orlando, FL	ESPN+	W 17–10	43,043
September 6	7:00 p.m.	North Carolina A&T*	Acrisure Bounce House; Orlando, FL	ESPN+	W 68–7	44,009
September 20	3:30 p.m.	North Carolina*	Acrisure Bounce House; Orlando, FL	FOX	W 34–9	44,206
September 27	12:00 p.m.	at Kansas State	Bill Snyder Family Football Stadium; Manhattan, KS	FS1	L 20–34	53,013
October 4	7:30 p.m.	Kansas	Acrisure Bounce House; Orlando, FL	ESPN2	L 20–27	43,229
October 11	12:00 p.m.	at Cincinnati	Nippert Stadium; Cincinnati, OH (rivalry)	FS1	L 11–20	35,782
October 18	1:00 p.m.	West Virginia^{†}	Acrisure Bounce House; Orlando, FL	TNT	W 45–13	43,445
November 1	12:00 p.m.	at Baylor	McLane Stadium; Waco, TX	ESPNU	L 3–30	40,212
November 7	8:00 p.m.	Houston	Acrisure Bounce House; Orlando, FL (Space Game)	FS1	L 27–30	44,206
November 15	3:30 p.m.	at No. 6 Texas Tech	Jones AT&T Stadium; Lubbock, TX	FOX	L 9–48	60,229
November 22	4:00 p.m.	Oklahoma State	Acrisure Bounce House; Orlando, FL	ESPN+	W 17–14	41,723
November 29	1:00 p.m.	at No. 11 BYU	LaVell Edwards Stadium; Provo, UT	ESPN2	L 21–41	60,389
*Non-conference game; ^{†}Homecoming; Rankings from AP Poll (and CFP Rankings, after November 4) - Released prior to game; All times are in Eastern time

- Source

== Offseason ==
=== Transfers ===
==== Incoming ====
Name	Position	Old school
Anthony Venneri	P	Ohio State
Mason Denaburg	P	NA
Dominick Campbell	C	Howard
Anthony Coaxam	DE	West Virginia Wesleyan
Rodney Lora	DL	North Carolina
Max Drag	TE	Appalachian State
Jayden McDonald	LB	Virginia Tech
Chris Domercant	WR	Chattanooga
Jayden Williams	DB	Florida Atlantic
Jeffson Lafontant	DL	BC
Davi Belfort	QB	Virginia Tech
Noe Ruelas	K	James Madison
Owen Spell	OL	Limestone
Aymeric Koumba	EDGE	Michigan
Connor Meadows	OL	Tennessee St.
Dalton Riggs	LS	BYU
Keli Lawson	LB	Virginia Tech
Lewis Carter	LB	Oklahoma
Marcus Burke	WR	Florida
Duane Thomas Jr.	WR	Charlotte
Jaden Nixon	RB	Western Michigan
Carter Miller	IOL	Colorado
Tayven Jackson	QB	Indiana
Sincere Edwards	EDGE	Pittsburgh (Pitt)
DJ Black	WR	Limestone
Cole Kozlowzki	LB	Colgate
Jyaire Brown	DB	LSU
Jayden Bellamy	DB	Syracuse
Jaeden Gould	DB	Syracuse
Horace Lockett	DL	Georgia Tech
Phillip Dunnam III	DB	Florida Atlantic
Phil Picciotti	LB	Oklahoma
Dylan Wade	TE	Maryland
Justin Royes	IOL	Virginia Union
Preston Cushman	OT	Ole Miss
Ric'Darious Farmer	WR	West Virginia
DJ Bell	S	Memphis
Isaiah Reed	WR	Brown
Cam Fancher	QB	Florida Atlantic
Gaard Memmelaar	IOL	Washington
RJ Jackson	DL	Tulsa

==== Outgoing ====
Name	Position	Destination
Chasen Johnson	DB	USC
Jakiah Leftwich	OT	TBD
Kevin Carrigan	P	South Dakota State
Jashad Presley	LB	UTSA
Andrew Harris	LB	Arkansas
Elijah Brown	TE	Kentucky
Quinten Johnson	EDGE	Delaware State
Cedrick Hawkins	DB	South Florida
Grant Reddick	K	TBD
Chase Malamala	OL	Southern Miss
Brandon Jacob	S	UTSA
Derrick McCormick	LB	South Florida
Kason Stokes	WR	Middle Tennessee
Qua Birdsong	LB	ETSU
Aidan Fedigan	LS	Tulsa
Marcus Downs	DL	Georgia Southern
Tre'Quon Fegans	CB	Jacksonville State
Waltclaire Flynn Jr.	OL	Georgia
Dylan Rizk	QB	Stanford
Chauncey Magwood	WR	Purdue
EJ Colson	QB	Incarnate Word
Xe'ree Alexander	LB	Washington
Lee Hunter	DL	Texas Tech
Adrian Medley	IOL	Florida State
Randy Pittman	TE	Florida State
Riley Trujillo	QB	Delaware
Mitch McCarthy	P	Indiana
Keyon Cox	OT	Oregon State
Matthew Alexander	DL	Georgia Tech
Jack Bernstein	LS	Kennesaw State
Marcellus Marshall	IOL	Minnesota
Caden Kitler	IOL	Arkansas
Reece Adkins	TE	UMass
Johnathan Cline	IOL	ETSU
Tyree Patterson	WR	Middle Tennessee
Wes Dorsey	OT	TBD
William Wells	DB	ETSU
Colton Boomer	K	Boise State
Xavier Townsend	WR	Iowa State
Kaven Call	DE	ETSU
Byron Threats	S	UCLA
Zavier Carter	EDGE	Georgia State

==== 2025 Recruits ====
College recruiting
Name	Hometown	School	Height	Weight	Commit date
Taevion Swint; Running back	Kissimmee, FL	Osceola High School	5 ft 10 in (1.78 m)	185 lb (84 kg)	Apr 23, 2023
Taevion Swint; Running back	Recruit ratings: Rivals: 247Sports: ESPN:				
Tony Williams; Safety	Miami, FL	Miami Central High School	6 ft 1 in (1.85 m)	190 lb (86 kg)	Mar 15, 2024
Tony Williams; Safety	Recruit ratings: Rivals: 247Sports: ESPN:				
Rukeem Stroud; Cornerback	Tampa, FL	Tampa Bay Technical High School	5 ft 11 in (1.80 m)	170 lb (77 kg)	Jun 24, 2024
Rukeem Stroud; Cornerback	Recruit ratings: Rivals: 247Sports: ESPN:				
LaParka Langston; Offensive tackle	Senatobia, MS	Northwest Mississippi Community College	6 ft 3 in (1.91 m)	325 lb (147 kg)	Dec 10, 2024
LaParka Langston; Offensive tackle	Recruit ratings: Rivals: 247Sports: ESPN:				
Caden Piening; Tight end	Cincinnati, OH	Anderson High School	6 ft 4 in (1.93 m)	246 lb (112 kg)	Mar 13, 2024
Caden Piening; Tight end	Recruit ratings: Rivals: 247Sports: ESPN:				
Carl Jenkins Jr. Wide receiver	St. Augustine, FL	St. Augustine High School	6 ft 3 in (1.91 m)	180 lb (82 kg)	Dec 4, 2024
Carl Jenkins Jr. Wide receiver	Recruit ratings: Rivals: 247Sports: ESPN:				
Malakhi Boone; Linebacker	Bushnell, FL	South Sumter High School	6 ft 2 in (1.88 m)	235 lb (107 kg)	May 1, 2024
Malakhi Boone; Linebacker	Recruit ratings: Rivals: 247Sports: ESPN:				
Waden Charles; Wide receiver	Boynton Beach, FL	Somerset Academy High School	6 ft 2 in (1.88 m)	185 lb (84 kg)	Jul 3, 2024
Waden Charles; Wide receiver	Recruit ratings: Rivals: 247Sports: ESPN:				
Jaquez Joiner; Offensive tackle	Cocoa, FL	Cocoa High School	6 ft 4 in (1.93 m)	260 lb (120 kg)	Sep 2, 2023
Jaquez Joiner; Offensive tackle	Recruit ratings: Rivals: 247Sports: ESPN:				
Jacob Maiava; Offensive guard	Kahuku, HI	Kahuku High School	6 ft 2 in (1.88 m)	290 lb (130 kg)	Feb 2, 2025
Jacob Maiava; Offensive guard	Recruit ratings: Rivals: 247Sports: ESPN:				
Camp Lott; Offensive tackle	McComb, MS	Parklane Academy	6 ft 6 in (1.98 m)	250 lb (110 kg)	Jan 31, 2025
Camp Lott; Offensive tackle	Recruit ratings: Rivals: 247Sports: ESPN:				
RyShawn Perry; Defensive tackle	Covington, GA	Newton High School	6 ft 3 in (1.91 m)	274 lb (124 kg)	Apr 7, 2024
RyShawn Perry; Defensive tackle	Recruit ratings: Rivals: 247Sports: ESPN:				
Raishaun McHaney; Offensive tackle	Indianapolis, IN	Lutheran High School of Indianapolis	6 ft 8 in (2.03 m)	260 lb (120 kg)	Feb 4, 2025
Raishaun McHaney; Offensive tackle	Recruit ratings: Rivals: 247Sports: ESPN:				
Trenton Turner; Defensive line	Lakeland, Florida	Lakeland High School	6 ft 2 in (1.88 m)	311 lb (141 kg)	Feb 5, 2025
Trenton Turner; Defensive line	Recruit ratings: Rivals: 247Sports: ESPN:				
Chance Nixon; Running back	Oviedo, Florida	Oviedo High School	5 ft 9 in (1.75 m)	180 lb (82 kg)	May 13, 2025
Chance Nixon; Running back	Recruit ratings: Rivals: 247Sports: ESPN:				
Overall recruit ranking:
Note: In many cases, Scout, Rivals, 247Sports, On3, and ESPN may conflict in their listings of height and weight.; In these cases, the average was taken. ESPN grades are on a 100-point scale.; Sources: "UCF Football Commitment List". Rivals.; "2025 Player Commitments - UCF". ESPN.; "2025 Team Ranking". Rivals.com.; "UCF Football 2025 Commits". 247Sports.

*= 247Sports Composite rating; ratings are out of 1.00. (five stars= 1.00–.98, four stars= .97–.90, three stars= .80–.89)
†= Despite being rated as a three star recruit by ESPN, On3.com, and 247Sports.com, Stroud received a four star rating by Rivals.com.
Δ= TBD left the UCF program following signing but prior to the 2025 season.

=== Award watch lists ===
Player	Position	Award(s)
Jaden Nixon	RB	Maxwell Award; Paul Hornung Award; Doak Walker Award; Earl Campbell Tyler Rose Award
Myles Montgomery	RB	Doak Walker Award
Paul Rubelt	OL	Wuerffel Trophy
Cam Fancher	QB	Comeback Player of the Year
John Walker	DT	Comeback Player of the Year

=== Preseason ===
For 2025, UCF elected to not conduct their annual spring exhibition game. This was due to ongoing construction at the stadium, and to protect the roster during the spring transfer portal window. As a substitute, the Knights arranged for two practice sessions to be open to the public.

The Big 12 officially discontinued their annual preseason media poll, but various other outlets predicted the Knights to finish 15th–16th in the conference.

== Game summaries ==
=== vs Jacksonville State ===
Jacksonville State Gamecocks (0–0) at UCF Knights (0–0) – Game summary

Quarter	1	2	3	4	Total
Gamecocks	0	0	3	7	10
Knights	0	0	3	14	17

at Acrisure Bounce House • Orlando, Florida

- Date: Thursday August 28, 2025
- Game time: 7:00 p.m. EDT
- Game weather: 81 °F (27 °C), rain
- Game attendance: 43,043
- Referee: Kevin Boitmann
- TV announcers (ESPN+): A. J. Ricketts (play-by-play) and Rene Ingoglia (analyst)
- Preview • Recap • Gamecast

Game information

First quarter

- No scoring plays.

Second quarter

- No scoring plays.

Third quarter

- UCF – Anthony Venneri 24-yard field goal, 8:03, Knights 3–0. Drive: 7 plays, 73 yards, 3:06.
- JVST – Garrison Rippa 42-yard field goal, 5:28, Tied 3–3. Drive: 9 plays, 50 yards, 2:35.

Fourth quarter

- JVST – Andrew Paul 10-yard run (Garrison Rippa Kick), 12:01, Gamecocks 10–3. Drive: 11 plays, 84 yards, 5:17.
- UCF – Dylan Wade 39-yard pass from Tayven Jackson (Noe Ruelas Kick), 9:30, Tied 10–10. Drive: 7 plays, 76 yards, 2:25.
- UCF – DJ Black 33-yard pass from Tayven Jackson (Noe Ruelas Kick), 1:03, Knights 17–10. Drive: 6 plays, 64 yards, 0:32.

Statistics	JVST	UCF
First downs	18	23
Plays–yards	69–322	70–422
Rushes–yards	39–165	37–108
Passing yards	157	314
Passing: Comp–Att–Int	16-30-1	22-33-0
Turnovers	1	1
Time of possession	28:04	31:56

Team	Category	Player	Statistics
Jacksonville State	Passing	Gavin Wimsatt	15/29, 139 yards, INT
Jacksonville State	Rushing	Cam Cook	17 carries, 75 yards
Jacksonville State	Receiving	Cam Cook	4 receptions, 43 yards
UCF	Passing	Tayven Jackson	17/24, 282 yards, 2 TD
UCF	Rushing	Myles Montgomery	21 carries, 79 yards
UCF	Receiving	Myles Montgomery	3 receptions, 71 yards

The Knights hosted defending Conference USA champions Jacksonville State on Thursday night. It marked the first game of Scott Frost's second tenure as head coach. Former Marshall and FAU transfer Cam Fancher started at quarterback, but was knocked out of the game early in the second quarter on a Targeting hit by Tre'Quon Fegans. The game was then halted due to lightning. After a two-hour and seven-minute weather delay, the game resumed with Tayven Jackson taking over at quarterback for the Knights.

The game was tied 10–10 late in the fourth quarter. Jacksonville State was driving into UCF territory with less than two minutes left in regulation. Facing a 4th & Inches at the UCF 36 yard line, the Gamecocks tried a hurry-up play. Cam Cook was tackled for no gain by Jayden Williams which turned the ball over on downs. A few plays later, the Knights were facing a 3rd & 10 at their own 36. Tayven Jackson scrambled for a 15-yard gain, then a late hit Targeting call on Trevor Woods tacked on an additional 15 yards. Three plays later, Jackson threw a 33-yard touchdown pass to DJ Black with 1:03 left, and the Knights won 17–10.

The victory marked UCF's 10th consecutive win on opening day, Frost's 14th consecutive win with the Knights, and the milestone 300th claimed victory for the program. (Note: As of August 29, 2025, official NCAA Statistics maintained an all-time record of 298–242–1. The NCAA does not include one of the Knight's wins from 1979 (vs. Fort Benning, because Fort Benning is not a college team and the NCAA views this game as an exhibition). In addition, UCF's 1980 record is disputed. The Carson–Newman Eagles were forced to forfeit their opening day 30–21 victory over the Knights due to an ineligible player. The official NCAA Statistics (possibly by error) maintain UCF's 1980 full season record as 3–5–1, However, the school and local media claim a record of 4–4–1, interpreting the Eagles forfeit as a Knights win.) (Note: not including one exhibition game victory against the Russia national American football team in 1992)

=== vs North Carolina A&T (FCS) ===
North Carolina A&T Aggies (FCS) (0–1) at UCF Knights (1–0) – Game summary

Quarter	1	2	3	4	Total
Aggies (FCS)	0	0	0	7	7
Knights	28	12	14	14	68

at Acrisure Bounce House • Orlando, Florida

- Date: Saturday September 6, 2025
- Game time: 7:00 p.m. EDT, delayed until 8:12 p.m. due to weather
- Game weather: 80 °F (27 °C), rain
- Game attendance: 44,009
- Referee: Luke Richmond
- TV announcers (ESPN+): Pete Sousa (play-by-play) and Todd Doxson (analyst)
- Preview • Recap • Gamecast

Game information

First quarter

- UCF – Jaden Nixon 96-yard kickoff return (Noe Ruelas kick), 14:57, Knights 7–0.
- UCF – Tayven Jackson 1-yard run (Noe Ruelas kick), 9:46, Knights 14–0. Drive: 8 plays, 65 yards, 2:56.
- UCF – Tayven Jackson 4-yard run (Noe Ruelas kick), 7:16, Knights 21–0. Drive: 4 plays, 24 yards, 1:45.
- UCF – Rodney Lora fumble recovery in endzone (Noe Ruelas kick), 2:06, Knights 28–0.

Second quarter

- UCF – Jaden Nixon 87-yard run (kick failed), 9:46, Knights 34–0. Drive: 1 play, 87 yards, 0:09.
- UCF – Noe Ruelas 34-yard field goal, 3:37, Knights 37–0. Drive: 7 plays, 48 yards, 2:10.
- UCF – Noe Ruelas 36-yard field goal, 0:00, Knights 40–0. Drive: 6 plays, 71 yards, 0:57.

Third quarter

- UCF – Jaden Nixon 66-yard run (Noe Ruelas kick), 6:56, Knights 47–0. Drive: 3 play, 74 yards, 1:10.
- UCF – Jacurri Brown 60-yard run (Noe Ruelas kick), 6:56, Knights 54–0. Drive: 1 play, 60 yards, 0:11.

Fourth quarter

- UCF – Jacurri Brown 15-yard run (Noe Ruelas kick), 14:42, Knights 61–0. Drive: 4 plays, 25 yards, 1:41.
- UCF – Stacy Gage 23-yard run (Noe Ruelas kick), 7:41, Knights 68–0. Drive: 8 plays, 63 yards, 4:56.
- NCAT – Shimique Blizzard 17-yard run (Andrew Brown kick), 3:00, Knights 68–7. Drive: 7 plays, 75 yards, 4:41.

Statistics	NCAT	UCF
First downs	13	20
Plays–yards	62–200	56–560
Rushes–yards	51–160	32–356
Passing yards	40	204
Passing: Comp–Att–Int	5–11–1	14–24–0
Turnovers	3	0
Time of possession	36:15	24:04

Team	Category	Player	Statistics
North Carolina A&T	Passing	Champ Long	3/7, 26 yards, 1 INT
North Carolina A&T	Rushing	Shimique Blizzard	11 carries, 75 yards, TD
North Carolina A&T	Receiving	Elijah Kennedy	2 receptions, 20 yards
UCF	Passing	Tayven Jackson	12/21, 189 yards
UCF	Rushing	Jaden Nixon	4 carries, 156 yards, 2 TD
UCF	Receiving	Duane Thomas Jr.	3 receptions, 68 yards

The Knights hosted North Carolina A&T on Saturday night. Kickoff was delayed 70 minutes due to weather. Jaden Nixon returned the opening kickoff 96 yards for a touchdown, and the Knights routed the Aggies. Tayven Jackson started at quarterback, and ran for two touchdowns in the first quarter. Nixon added an 87-yard touchdown run in the second quarter, and UCF built a 40–0 halftime lead. Jacurri Brown took over at quarterback in the second half. The Knights cruised to a 68–7 victory.

Nixon was the offensive standout for the night with three total touchdowns and 156 yards rushing on just four carries. Nixon was named Big 12 Offensive Player of the Week. UCF improved to 2–0 for the third straight season, and head coach Scott Frost won his 15th consecutive game with the Knights.

=== vs North Carolina ===
North Carolina Tar Heels (2–1) at UCF Knights (2–0) – Game summary

Quarter	1	2	3	4	Total
Tar Heels	0	3	6	0	9
Knights	10	10	7	7	34

at Acrisure Bounce House • Orlando, Florida

- Date: Saturday September 20, 2025
- Game time: 3:30 p.m. EDT; kickoff pushed to 3:45 p.m.
- Game weather: Sunny • Temperature: 85 °F (29 °C) • Wind: SW 10 mph
- Game attendance: 44,206
- Referee: Nate Black
- TV announcers (FOX): Eric Collins (play-by-play) and Spencer Tillman (analyst)
- Preview • Recap • Gamecast

Game information

First quarter

- UCF – Tayven Jackson 13-yard run (Noe Ruelas kick), 8:23, Knights 7–0. Drive: 13 plays, 75 yards, 6:37.
- UCF – Noe Ruelas 36-yard field goal, 4:51, Knights 10–0. Drive: 4 plays, 5 yards, 1:26.

Second quarter

- UCF – Noe Ruelas 41-yard field goal, 10:03, Knights 13–0. Drive: 14 plays, 42 yards, 7:44.
- UNC – Rece Verhoff 40-yard field goal, 1:23, Knights 13–3. Drive: 7 plays, 29 yards, 1:48.
- UCF – Kylan Fox 17-yard pass from Tayven Jackson (Noe Ruelas kick), 0:13, Knights 20–3. Drive: 6 plays, 83 yards, 1:04.

Third quarter

- UCF – Myles Montgomery 1-yard run (Noe Ruelas kick), 9:51, Knights 27–3. Drive: 6 plays, 64 yards, 2:57.
- UNC – Kobe Paysour 8-yard pass from Max Johnson (pass failed), 1:06, Knights 27–9. Drive: 19 plays, 80 yards, 8:40.

Fourth quarter

- UCF – Jaden Nixon 5-yard run (Noe Ruelas kick), 1:54, Knights 34–9. Drive: 18 plays, 93 yards, 10:26.

Statistics	UNC	UCF
First downs	14	23
Plays–yards	58–217	66–366
Rushes–yards	25–63	34–143
Passing yards	154	223
Passing: comp–att–int	22–32–2	25–32–0
Turnovers	2	0
Time of possession	26:13	33:47

Team	Category	Player	Statistics
North Carolina	Passing	Gio Lopez	11/14, 87 yards, 2 INT
North Carolina	Rushing	Demon June	10 carries, 50 yards
North Carolina	Receiving	Jordan Shipp	3 receptions, 44 yards
UCF	Passing	Tayven Jackson	25/32, 223 yards, TD
UCF	Rushing	Tayven Jackson	10 carries, 66 yards, TD
UCF	Receiving	Dylan Wade	5 receptions, 47 yards

The Knights hosted North Carolina, the first meeting between the two teams. Tayven Jackson threw for 223 yards, and one touchdown pass, and also ran for a touchdown, as the Knights defeated the Tar Heels 34–9. UCF improved to 3–0 for the third straight season, and head coach Scott Frost won his 16th consecutive game with the Knights.

A scheduled meeting between the two teams in 2018 was cancelled due to Hurricane Florence, then another scheduled meeting in 2020 was also cancelled due to the COVID-19 pandemic. The game was part of a new replacement home-and-home series, with a matchup in Chapel Hill set for 2027.

For the third time in as many games, the Knights defense held their opponent scoreless on the opening possession. They also kept alive their streak by not allowing a touchdown in the first half. The Knights defense had one interception and one fumble recovery, and both turnovers led to points. North Carolina finally found the endzone in the third quarter, at which point the score was 27–9. UCF put the game away in the fourth quarter with an 18-play, 93-yard touchdown drive, which consumed 10 minutes and 26 seconds of game clock.

=== at Kansas State ===
UCF Knights (3–0) at Kansas State Wildcats (1–3) – Game summary

Quarter	1	2	3	4	Total
Knights	0	7	10	3	20
Wildcats	0	17	14	3	34

at Bill Snyder Family Football Stadium • Manhattan, Kansas

- Date: Saturday September 27, 2025
- Game time: 11:00 a.m. CDT / 12:00 p.m. EDT
- Game weather: 73 °F (23 °C), sunny
- Game attendance: 53,013
- Referee: Luke Richmond
- TV announcers (FS1): Connor Onion (play-by-play) and Mark Helfrich (analyst)
- Preview • Recap • Gamecast

Game information

First quarter

- No scoring plays.

Second quarter

- KSU – Luis Rodriguez 38-yard field goal, 13:03, Wildcats 3–0. Drive: 10 plays, 62 yards, 5:17.
- KSU – Joe Jackson 1-yard run (Luis Rodriguez kick), 3:52, Wildcats 10–0. Drive: 7 plays, 26 yards, 3:35.
- UCF – DJ Black 82-yard pass from Jacurri Brown (Noe Ruelas kick), 2:54, Wildcats 10–7. Drive: 2 plays, 77 yards, 0:51.
- KSU – Will Anciaux 3-yard pass from Avery Johnson (Luis Rodriguez kick), 0:45, Wildcats 17–7. Drive: 9 plays, 73 yards, 2:04.

Third quarter

- KSU – Garrett Oakley 1-yard pass from Avery Johnson (Luis Rodriguez kick), 9:58, Wildcats 24–7. Drive: 6 plays, 65 yards, 2:46.
- UCF – Noe Ruelas 53-yard field goal, 2:01, Wildcats 24–10. Drive: 11 plays, 48 yards, 4:02.
- KSU – Dylan Edwards 75-yard run (Luis Rodriguez kick), 1:50, Wildcats 31–10. Drive: 1 play, 75 yards, 0:11.
- UCF – Jaden Nixon 54-yard run (Noe Ruelas kick), 0:20, Wildcats 31–17. Drive: 6 plays, 75 yards, 1:30.

Fourth quarter

- UCF – Noe Ruelas 40-yard field goal, 9:34, Wildcats 31–20. Drive: 8 plays, 59 yards, 4:03.
- KSU – Luis Rodriguez 48-yard field goal, 2:41, Wildcats 34–20. Drive: 4 plays, 7 yards, 1:35.

Statistics	UCF	KSU
First downs	13	21
Plays–yards	59–402	70–434
Rushes–yards	33–205	44–266
Passing yards	197	168
Passing: comp–att–int	13–26–2	18–26–1
Turnovers	3	1
Time of possession	27:51	32:09

Team	Category	Player	Statistics
UCF	Passing	Tayven Jackson	12/24, 115 yards, 1 INT
UCF	Rushing	Myles Montgomery	10 carries, 119 yards
UCF	Receiving	DJ Black	1 reception, 82 yards, 1 TD
Kansas State	Passing	Avery Johnson	18/25, 168 yards, 2 TD
Kansas State	Rushing	Dylan Edwards	20 carries, 166 yards, 1 TD
Kansas State	Receiving	Jaron Tibbs	8 receptions, 72 yards

UCF traveled to Kansas State for their Big 12 conference opener. The Wildcats defeated the Knights 34–20. Quarterback Tayven Jackson was knocked out of the game with a shoulder injury in the second quarter, but he would return in the second half. The UCF offense managed some explosive plays, including an 82-yard touchdown reception by DJ Black, and a 54-yard touchdown run by Jaden Nixon. But three turnovers, and a turnover on downs resulted in several drives coming up empty. The Wildcats put up 266 yards on the ground, and turned the ball over only one time – an interception on the first drive of the first quarter.

UCF dropped to 3–1 on the season (0–1 in the Big 12). The loss was head coach Scott Frost's first loss with the Knights program since the 2016 Cure Bowl on December 17, 2016.

=== vs Kansas ===
Kansas Jayhawks (3–2) at UCF Knights (3–1) – Game summary

Quarter	1	2	3	4	Total
Jayhawks	0	14	13	0	27
Knights	7	13	0	0	20

at Acrisure Bounce House • Orlando, Florida

- Date: Saturday October 4, 2025
- Game time: 7:30 p.m. EDT
- Game weather: 75 °F (24 °C), Rain
- Game attendance: 43,229
- Referee: Stephen Baron
- TV announcers (ESPN2): Lowell Galindo (play-by-play), Aaron Murray (analyst), and Lauren Sisler (sideline)
- Preview • Recap • Gamecast

Game information

First quarter

- UCF – Myles Montgomery 29-yard run (Noe Ruelas kick), 8:15, Knights 7–0. Drive: 10 plays, 79 yards, 4:33.

Second quarter

- UCF – Myles Montgomery 3-yard run (Noe Ruelas kick), 14:55, Knights 14–0. Drive: 8 plays, 60 yards, 4:00.
- KU – Leshon Williams 1-yard run (Laith Marjan kick), 10:38, Knights 14–7. Drive: 9 plays, 75 yards, 4:17.
- UCF – Noe Ruelas 38-yard field goal, 7:49, Knights 17–7. Drive: 7 plays, 55 yards, 2:49.
- KU – Leshon Williams 4-yard run (Laith Marjan kick), 1:55, Knights 17–14. Drive: 11 plays, 75 yards, 5:49.
- UCF – Noe Ruelas 38-yard field goal, 0:05, Knights 20–14. Drive: 12 plays, 54 yards, 1:44.

Third quarter

- KU – Laith Marjan 33-yard field goal, 7:07, Knights 20–17. Drive: 10 plays, 59 yards, 5:46.
- KU – Laith Marjan 41-yard field goal, 4:01, Tied 20–20. Drive: 6 plays, 46 yards, 2:24.
- KU – Leshon Williams 2-yard run (Laith Marjan kick), 3:00, Jayhawks 27–20. Drive: 1 play, 2 yards, 0:05.

Fourth quarter

- No scoring plays.

Statistics	KU	UCF
First downs	15	21
Plays–yards	58–356	76–375
Rushes–yards	32–121	39–199
Passing yards	235	176
Passing: comp–att–int	18–26–0	22–37–0
Turnovers	0	1
Time of possession	30:01	29:59

Team	Category	Player	Statistics
Kansas	Passing	Jalon Daniels	18/26, 235 yards
Kansas	Rushing	Leshon Williams	12 carries, 58 yards, 3 TD
Kansas	Receiving	Cam Pickett	5 receptions, 64 yards
UCF	Passing	Tayven Jackson	14/23, 97 yards
UCF	Rushing	Myles Montgomery	22 carries, 110 yards, 2 TD
UCF	Receiving	Duane Thomas Jr.	5 receptions, 42 yards

The Knights jumped out to a 14–0 lead with two Myles Montgomery touchdown runs in the first half. But Kansas started chipping away at the deficit. Kansas took the lead in the third quarter after a sack and fumble by quarterback Tayven Jackson. Jackson was knocked out of the game with a shoulder injury, and one play later, Kansas was in the endzone with a 2-yard touchdown run by Leshon Williams. Trailing 27–20, Cam Fancher drove the Knights to the Kansas 1 yard line with 2:00 left in regulation. Facing a 2nd & Goal at the 1, the Kansas defense stopped the Knights on three straight plays – a goal-line stand that essentially won the game for the Jayhawks.

UCF dropped to 3–2 on the season (0–2 in the Big 12).

=== at Cincinnati (rivalry) ===
UCF Knights (3–2) at Cincinnati Bearcats (4–1) – Game summary

Quarter	1	2	3	4	Total
Knights	0	3	0	8	11
Bearcats	7	10	0	3	20

at Nippert Stadium • Cincinnati, Ohio

- Date: Saturday October 11, 2025
- Game time: 12:00 p.m. EDT
- Game weather: 73 °F (23 °C), sunny
- Game attendance: 35,782
- Referee:
- TV announcers (FS1): Dan Hellie (play-by-play) and Petros Papadakis (analyst)
- Preview • Recap • Gamecast

Game information

First quarter

- CIN – Jeff Caldwell 40-yard pass from Brendan Sorsby (Stephen Rusnak kick), 8:23. Bearcats 7–0. Drive: 4 plays, 59 yards, 1:26.

Second quarter

- CIN – Jeff Caldwell 9-yard pass from Brendan Sorsby (Stephen Rusnak kick), 12:12. Bearcats 14–0. Drive: 9 plays, 83 yards, 3:47.
- CIN – Stephen Rusnak 32-yard field goal, 4:13. Bearcats 17–0. Drive: 13 plays, 39 yards, 5:18.
- UCF – Noe Ruelas 45-yard field goal, 0:24. Bearcats 17–3. Drive: 12 plays, 49 yards, 3:49.

Third quarter

- No scoring plays.

Fourth quarter

- CIN – Stephen Rusnak 24-yard field goal, 13:39. Bearcats 20–3. Drive: 7 plays, 82 yards, 3:16.
- UCF – Cam Francher 3-yard run (Cam Francher pass to Chris Domercant), 2:07. Bearcats 20–11. Drive: 19 plays, 90 yards, 7:00.

Statistics	UCF	CIN
First downs	26	14
Plays–yards	90–413	48–306
Rushes–yards	41–191	27–115
Passing yards	222	191
Passing: comp–att–int	28–49–0	12–21–0
Turnovers	1	0
Time of possession	39:44	20:16

Team	Category	Player	Statistics
UCF	Passing	Cam Fancher	28/49, 222 yards
UCF	Rushing	Cam Fancher	20 carries, 108 yards, TD
UCF	Receiving	Dylan Wade	5 receptions, 55 yards
Cincinnati	Passing	Brendan Sorsby	12/21, 191 yards, 2 TD
Cincinnati	Rushing	Evan Pryor	11 carries, 48 yards
Cincinnati	Receiving	Joe Royer	2 receptions, 83 yards

Cam Fancher started at quarterback. Fancher threw for 222 yards and ran for a touchdown, but the Knights fell to the Bearcats 20–11. UCF outgained Cincinnati in total yards, passing yards, rushing yards, and dominated the time of possession, but penalties, a turnover (fumble), and three turnovers on downs saw most drives come up empty. UCF fell behind 17–0, and did not reach the endzone until late in the fourth quarter.

UCF lost their third straight game and fell to 3–3 (0–3 in Big 12).

=== vs West Virginia ===
West Virginia Mountaineers (2–4) at UCF Knights (3–3) – Game summary

Quarter	1	2	3	4	Total
Mountaineers	0	7	0	6	13
Knights	14	0	21	10	45

at Acrisure Bounce House • Orlando, Florida

- Date: Saturday October 18, 2025
- Game time: 1:00 p.m. EDT
- Game weather: 79 °F (26 °C), sunny
- Game attendance: 43,445
- Referee: Tutashinda Salaam
- TV announcers (TNT/TruTV): J.B. Long (play-by-play), Mike Golic Jr. (analyst), and Lauren Jbara (sideline)
- Preview • Recap • Gamecast

Game information

First quarter

- UCF – Chris Domercant 40-yard pass from Tayven Jackson (Noe Ruelas kick), 11:33, Knights 7–0. Drive: 6 plays, 97 yards, 1:45.
- UCF – Chris Domercant 34-yard pass from Tayven Jackson (Noe Ruelas kick), 4:54, Knights 14–0. Drive: 7 plays, 68 yards, 3:07.

Second quarter

- WVU – Khalil Wilkins 6-yard run (Kade Hensley kick), 14:19, Knights 14–7. Drive: 5 plays, 39 yards, 1:36.

Third quarter

- UCF – Jaden Nixon 12-yard run (Noe Ruelas kick), 11:53, Knights 21–7. Drive: 9 plays, 92 yards, 3:02.
- UCF – Keli Lawson 32-yard fumble return (Noe Ruelas kick), 10:40, Knights 28–7.
- UCF – Jaden Nixon 83-yard run (Noe Ruelas kick), 2:12, Knights 35–7. Drive: 2 plays, 85 yards, 0:49.

Fourth quarter

- UCF – Noe Ruelas 51-yard field goal, 9:40, Knights 38–7. Drive: 4 plays, -1 yard, 1:22.
- UCF – Davi Belfort 10-yard run (Noe Ruelas kick), 4:17, Knights 45–7. Drive: 10 plays, 72 yards, 4:42.
- WVU – Diore Hubbard 1-yard run (kick failed), 1:46, Knights 45–13. Drive: 3 plays, 1 yard, 0:35.

Statistics	WVU	UCF
First downs	19	21
Plays–yards	77–210	75–578
Rushes–yards	49–131	35–255
Passing yards	79	323
Passing: comp–att–int	11–28–0	26–40–2
Turnovers	1	2
Time of possession	26:53	33:07

Team	Category	Player	Statistics
West Virginia	Passing	Scotty Fox Jr.	6/17, 47 yards
West Virginia	Rushing	Khalil Wilkins	15 carries, 48 yards, TD
West Virginia	Receiving	Justin Smith-Brown	2 receptions, 27 yards
UCF	Passing	Tayven Jackson	23/34, 2 TD, INT
UCF	Rushing	Jaden Nixon	7 carries, 116 yards, 2 TD
UCF	Receiving	Chris Domercant	5 receptions, 89 yards, 2 TD

UCF hosted West Virginia on Homecoming weekend. The Knights snapped a three-game losing streak, and soundly defeated the Mountaineers 45–13. Tayven Jackson started at quarterback (Cam Fancher was inactive due to injury) and threw for 277 yards and 2 touchdown passes. The Knights put up 578 yards on offense. The defense held West Virginia to only 79 passing yards, recorded 7 sacks, and had a fumble recovery returned for a touchdown.

Jackson got the Knights on the board in the first quarter with two touchdown passes to Chris Domercant. Both were scored on 4th down plays. On their next two drives, however, UCF turned the ball over on downs, failing on 4th & short both times. The Knights led 14–7 at halftime, after West Virginia missed a field goal attempt as time expired in the second quarter.

The third quarter belonged to the Knights. They received the second half kickoff, and drove 92 yards in 9 plays. Jaden Nixon's 12-yard touchdown run gave UCF a 28–7 lead. Moments later, Khalil Wilkins was sacked and fumbled. Keli Lawson scooped the ball up and returned it 32 yards for a Knights touchdown. Jaden Nixon capped off the explosive third quarter with a 83-yard touchdown run, and a 35–7 lead.

The Knights added a field goal and another touchdown and won 45–13. It was their first victory against West Virginia, and first conference win of the season. The Knights improved to 4–3 on the season (1–3 in Big 12).

=== at Baylor ===
UCF Knights (4–3) at Baylor Bears (4–4) – Game summary

Quarter	1	2	3	4	Total
Knights	0	3	0	0	3
Bears	14	6	3	7	30

at McLane Stadium • Waco, Texas

- Date: Saturday November 1, 2025
- Game time: 11:00 a.m. CDT / 12:00 p.m. EDT
- Game weather: Cloudy, 59 degrees
- Game attendance: 40,212
- Referee: Kevin Boitmann
- TV announcers (ESPNU): Brian Custer (play-by-play) and Craig Haubert (analyst)
- Preview • Recap • Gamecast

Game information

First quarter

- BAY – Michael Trigg 13-yard pass from Sawyer Robertson (Connor Hawkins Kick), 10:49, Bears 7–0. Drive: 11 plays, 75 yards, 4:11.
- BAY – Josh Cameron 2-yard pass from Sawyer Robertson (Connor Hawkins Kick), 6:41, Bears 14–0. Drive: 8 plays, 48 yards, 3:03.

Second quarter

- BAY – Connor Hawkins 40-yard field goal, 14:14, Bears 17–0. Drive: 8 plays, 64 yards, 3:13.
- BAY – Connor Hawkins 28-yard field goal, 2:28, Bears 20–0. Drive: 6 plays, 48 yards, 1:47.
- UCF – Noe Ruelas 45-yard field goal, 0:01, Bears 20–3. Drive: 3 plays, 0 yards, 0:13.

Third quarter

- BAY – Connor Hawkins 41-yard field goal, 4:28, Bears 23–3. Drive: 13 plays, 42 yards, 6:30.

Fourth quarter

- BAY – Kole Wilson 9-yard pass from Sawyer Robertson (Connor Hawkins Kick), 6:04, Bears 30–3. Drive: 3 plays, 7 yards, 1:37.

Statistics	UCF	BAY
First downs	13	24
Plays–yards	56–225	79–417
Rushes–yards	23–74	39–150
Passing yards	151	267
Passing: comp–att–int	18–33–2	29–40–0
Turnovers	2	1
Time of possession	26:02	33:58

Team	Category	Player	Statistics
UCF	Passing	Tayven Jackson	18/33, 151 yards, 2 INT
UCF	Rushing	Myles Montgomery	12 carries, 50 yards
UCF	Receiving	Duane Thomas Jr.	8 receptions, 77 yards
Baylor	Passing	Sawyer Robertson	29/40, 267 yards, 3 TD
Baylor	Rushing	Caden Knighten	21 carries, 104 yards
Baylor	Receiving	Michael Trigg	5 receptions, 82 yards, TD

UCF traveled to Baylor after their bye week. The Bears defeated the Knights 30–3. UCF struggled on offense and their only points came on a field goal at the end of the first half. It was UCF's first game without scoring a touchdown since 2015. The Knights slipped to 4–4 (1–4 Big 12).

=== vs Houston ===
Houston Cougars (7–2) at UCF Knights (4–4) – Game summary

Quarter	1	2	3	4	Total
Cougars	0	17	7	6	30
Knights	3	21	3	0	27

at Acrisure Bounce House • Orlando, Florida

- Date: Friday November 7, 2025
- Game time: 8:15 p.m. EST
- Game weather: 72 °F (22 °C), clear
- Game attendance: 44,206
- TV announcers (FS1): Dan Hellie (play-by-play) and Petros Papadakis (analyst)
- Preview • Recap • Gamecast

Game information

First quarter

- UCF – Noe Ruelas 37-yard field goal, 4:17, Knights 3–0. Drive: 10 plays, 36 yards, 3:51.

Second quarter

- UCF – Myles Montgomery 1-yard run (Noe Ruelas kick), 9:39, Knights 10–0. Drive: 4 plays, 25 yards, 1:32.
- HOU – Amare Thomas 64-yard pass from Conner Weigman (Ethan Sanchez kick), 7:52, Knights 10–7. Drive: 4 plays, 75 yards, 1:47.
- HOU – Latreveon McCutchin 45-yard interception return (Ethan Sanchez kick), 6:36, Cougars 14–10.
- UCF – Jaden Nixon 15-yard run (Noe Ruelas kick), 2:05, Knights 17–14. Drive: 10 plays, 75 yards, 4:31.
- UCF – Phillip Dunnam 43-yard interception return (Noe Ruelas kick), 1:36, Knights 24–14.
- HOU – Ethan Sanchez 40-yard field goal, 0:00, Knights 24–17. Drive: 10 plays, 35 yards, 1:36.

Third quarter

- HOU – Dean Connors 9-yard pass from Conner Weigman (Ethan Sanchez kick), 7:38, Tied 24–24. Drive: 5 plays, 55 yards, 2:28.
- UCF – Noe Ruelas 54-yard field goal, 1:06, Knights 27–24. Drive: 5 plays, 27 yards, 1:38.

Fourth quarter

- HOU – Ethan Sanchez 30-yard field goal, 11:19, Tied 27–27. Drive: 11 plays, 63 yards, 4:47.
- HOU – Ethan Sanchez 22-yard field goal, 2:31, Cougars 30–27. Drive: 15 plays, 62 yards, 7:51.

Statistics	HOU	UCF
First downs	26	14
Plays–yards	80–433	60–282
Rushes–yards	49–210	30–146
Passing yards	223	136
Passing: comp–att–int	20–31–3	15–30–2
Turnovers	4	2
Time of possession	34:38	25:22

Team	Category	Player	Statistics
Houston	Passing	Conner Weigman	20/31, 223 yards, 2 TD, 3 INT
Houston	Rushing	Conner Weigman	22 carries, 82 yards
Houston	Receiving	Amare Thomas	5 receptions, 103 yards, TD
UCF	Passing	Tayven Jackson	15/29, 136 yards, INT
UCF	Rushing	Jaden Nixon	11 carries, 62 yards, TD
UCF	Receiving	Dylan Wade	6 receptions, 80 yards

UCF hosted Houston in the ninth annual edition of the Space Game. The Knights fell to the Cougars 30–27 after an interception in the endzone with 11 seconds left in regulation. The Knights defense forced four turnovers – defensive back Phillip Dunnam set a single-game school record with three interceptions, including one returned for a touchdown. It was UCF's first loss in the nine-year history of the Space Game, and they fell to 4–5 on the season (1–5 Big 12).

UCF led 3–0 after the first quarter. Houston was held to a turnover on downs, a punt, and an interception by Phillip Dunnam (his first of three). The second quarter, however was explosive for both teams. Mekhi Mews muffed a punt, and UCF recovered at the Houston 25 yard line. Four plays later, Myles Montgomery was in the endzone, and UCF led 10–0. Houston responded with a 64-yard bomb to Amare Thomas, which made the score 10–7. Moments later, Tayven Jackson's pass was intercepted by Latreveon McCutchin, who returned it 45 yards for a touchdown. UCF responded, however, with a 10-play, 75 yard drive, capped off by a 15-yard touchdown run by Jaden Nixon. Three plays later, Phillip Dunnam picked off Conner Weigman, and returned the ball 43 yards for a touchdown (his second interception of the game). UCF led 24–17 at halftime.

In the third quarter, Phillip Dunnam's third interception led to a UCF field goal, and a 27–24 lead to start the fourth quarter. Houston tied the score with an 11-play, 63 yard drive, ending in a field goal. UCF went three and out, and punted back to Houston. The Cougars drove 62 yards, burning almost 8 minutes off the clock. The Knights defense stiffened, and kept the Cougars out of the endzone. Houston kicked a field goal, and went up 30–27 with 2:23 to go.

Aided by an unsportsmanlike conduct penalty assessed on the kickoff, UCF started their drive at the 46 yard line. Devi Belfort came in at quarterback. Two big runs by Belfort got the Knights to the Houston 27. On 3rd & 13 with 11 seconds to go, Belfort's pass to the endzone intended for Duane Thomas was intercepted by Kentrell Webb, and the game was over.

=== at No. 6 Texas Tech ===
UCF Knights (4–5) at No. 6 Texas Tech Red Raiders (9–1) – Game summary

Quarter	1	2	3	4	Total
Knights	0	2	7	0	9
No. 6 Red Raiders	14	24	10	0	48

at Jones AT&T Stadium • Lubbock, Texas

- Date: Saturday November 15, 2025
- Game time: 2:30 p.m. CST / 3:30 p.m. EDT
- Game weather: Sunny, 86 °F (30 °C), N 17 mph
- Game attendance: 60,229
- Referee: Henry Johns
- TV announcers (FOX): Tim Brando (play-by-play), Devin Gardner (analyst), and Josh Sims (sideline)
- Preview • Recap • Gamecast

Game information
First quarter
- TTU – Cameron Dickey 12-yard run (Stone Harrington kick), 13:57. Red Raiders 7–0. Drive: 4 plays, 75 yards, 1:03.
- TTU – Jacob Rodriguez 2-yard run (Stone Harrington kick), 9:29. Red Raiders 14–0. Drive: 6 plays, 58 yards, 2:14.

Second quarter

- TTU – Reggie Virgil 5-yard run (Stone Harrington kick), 14:55. Red Raiders 21–0. Drive: 13 plays, 51 yards, 4:05.
- UCF – Penalty on Howard Sampson enforced in the end zone for a safety, 10:11. Red Raiders 21–2.
- TTU – Reggie Virgil 30-yard run (Stone Harrington kick), 4:42. Red Raiders 28–2. Drive: 4 plays, 44 yards, 1:49.
- TTU – Reggie Virgil 8-yard pass from Behren Morton (Stone Harrington kick), 2:58. Red Raiders 35–2. Drive: 3 plays, 23 yards, 1:02.
- TTU – Stone Harrington 45-yard field goal, 0:02. Red Raiders 38–2. Drive: 6 plays, 70 yards, 1:02.

Third quarter

- UCF – Dylan Wade 8-yard pass from Tayven Jackson (Noe Ruelas kick), 10:57. Red Raiders 38–9. Drive: 8 plays, 75 yards, 4:03.
- TTU – Stone Harrington 53-yard field goal, 9:13. Red Raiders 41–9. Drive: 5 plays, 31 yards, 1:38.
- TTU – Cameron Dickey 1-yard run (Stone Harrington kick), 3:10. Red Raiders 48–9. Drive: 8 plays, 44 yards, 2:45.

Fourth quarter

- No scoring plays

Statistics	UCF	TTU
First downs	13	26
Plays–yards	62–230	71–499
Rushes–yards	29–52	35–205
Passing yards	178	294
Passing: comp–att–int	27–33–1	27–36–0
Turnovers	2	0
Time of possession	30:53	29:07

Team	Category	Player	Statistics
UCF	Passing	Tayven Jackson	27/33, 178 yards, TD, INT
UCF	Rushing	Jaden Nixon	15 carries, 32 yards
UCF	Receiving	Dylan Wade	6 receptions, 45 yards, TD
TTU	Passing	Behren Morton	14/20, 149 yards, 1 TD
TTU	Rushing	Cameron Dickey	11 carries, 77 yards, 2 TD
TTU	Receiving	Caleb Douglas	5 receptions 90 yards

UCF faced 6th-ranked Texas Tech. The Red Raiders routed the Knights 48–9. UCF dropped to 4–6 on the season (1–6 Big 12). The only offensive points for the Knights came at the beginning of the third quarter; an 8-yard pass from Tayven Jackson to Dylan Wade.

=== vs Oklahoma State ===
Oklahoma State Cowboys (1–9) at UCF Knights (4–6) – Game summary

Quarter	1	2	3	4	Total
Cowboys	7	7	0	0	14
Knights	0	0	7	10	17

at Acrisure Bounce House • Orlando, Florida

- Date: Saturday November 22, 2025
- Game time: 4:00 p.m.
- Game weather: 83 °F, sunny
- Game attendance: 41,723
- Referee: Tutashinda Salaam
- TV announcers (ESPN+): Brian Custer (play-by-play) and Leger Douzable (analyst)
- Preview • Recap • Gamecast

Game information

First quarter

- OKST – Gavin Freeman 5-yard pass from Zane Flores (Logan Ward kick), 8:06, Cowboys 7–0. Drive: 13 plays, 75 yards, 6:54.

Second quarter

- OKST – Zane Flores 6-yard run (Logan Ward kick), 0:50, Cowboys 14–0. Drive: 12 plays, 77 yards, 5:35.

Third quarter

- UCF – Dylan Wade 83-yard pass from Tayven Jackson (Noe Ruelas kick), 14:39, Cowboys 14–7. Drive: 1 play, 83 yards, 0:13.

Fourth quarter

- UCF – Dylan Wade 2-yard pass from Tayven Jackson (Noe Ruelas kick), 9:12, Tied 14–14. Drive: 8 plays, 45 yards, 3:43.
- UCF – Noe Ruelas 34-yard field goal, 0:57, Knights 17–14. Drive: 10 plays, 73 yards, 5:49.

Statistics	OKST	UCF
First downs	13	16
Plays–yards	58–228	61–396
Rushes–yards	30–104	36–125
Passing yards	124	271
Passing: comp–att–int	13–28–1	16–25–2
Turnovers	1	2
Time of possession	28:32	31:28

Team	Category	Player	Statistics
OKST	Passing	Zane Flores	13/28, 124 yards, TD, INT
OKST	Rushing	Rodney Fields Jr.	19 carries, 87 yards
OKST	Receiving	Gavin Freeman	5 receptions 40 yards, TD
UCF	Passing	Tayven Jackson	16/25, 271 yards, 2 TD, 2 INT
UCF	Rushing	Myles Montgomery	18 carries, 81 yards
UCF	Receiving	Dylan Wade	4 receptions 145 yards, 2 TD

Noe Ruelas kicked a 34-yard field goal with 57 seconds left to lift UCF over Oklahoma State by the score of 17–14 on Senior Day. The Cowboys took a 14–0 lead into halftime, but the Knights scored 17 unanswered points in the second half for a comeback win.

The Knights offense was mostly inept in the first half, with two turnovers, three punts, and no points. Oklahoma State (1–9 and in last place in the Big 12 going into the game) scored on their opening drive, and extended their lead to 14 just before halftime. UCF got the ball to start the second half, and immediately got on the board. On the first play from scrimmage, Tayven Jackson found Dylan Wade wide open for an 83-yard touchdown pass. The Knights defense would shutout the Cowboys in the second half, holding them to only 27 second half offensive yards.

Early in the fourth quarter, Antione Jackson's punt return set the Knights up at the Cowboys 45 yard line. Tayven Jackson drove the Knights 45 yards in 8 plays for the tying score. On 4th & Goal from the Cowboys 2 yard line, Jackson found a wide open Dylan Wade in the right endzone. It was Wade's second touchdown catch of the game. The Knights defense forced a punt, and got the ball back with 6:33 left in regulation. UCF drove to the Cowboys 16 yard line. Ruelas kicked the go-ahead field goal with 57 seconds left on the clock. On the first play of the ensuing drive, Zane Flores's pass was broken up by Braeden Marshall and intercepted by Jayden Bellamy. The Knights improved to 5–6 (2–6 in Big 12), and stayed alive for bowl eligibility.

During the second half, fans in the north endzone, adjacent to the student section, began a Tarps Off rally, the first-such at the Bounce House.

=== at No. 11 BYU ===
UCF Knights (5-6) at No. 11 BYU Cougars (10-1) – Game summary

Quarter	1	2	3	4	Total
Knights	14	0	7	0	21
No. 11 Cougars	0	17	21	3	41

at LaVell Edwards Stadium • Provo, Utah

- Date: Saturday November 29, 2025
- Game time: 11:00 a.m. MST / 1:00 p.m. EST
- Game attendance: 60,389
- Referee: Michael VanderVelde
- TV announcers (ESPN2): Matt Schumacker (play-by-play), Dustin Fox (analyst) and Sherree Burruss (sideline)
- Preview • Recap • Gamecast

Game information

First quarter

- UCF – Dylan Wade 4-yard pass from Tayven Jackson (Noe Ruelas kick), 9:27, Knights 7–0. Drive: 11 plays, 75 yards, 5:33.
- UCF – Agyeman Addae 20-yard pass from Tayven Jackson (Noe Ruelas kick), 3:39, Knights 14–0. Drive: 7 plays, 52 yards, 3:40.

Second quarter

- BYU – LJ Martin 1-yard run (Will Ferrin kick), 13:34, Knights 14–7. Drive: 9 plays, 65 yards, 4:59.
- BYU – LJ Martin 1-yard run (Will Ferrin kick), 4:54, Tied 14–14. Drive: 7 plays, 54 yards, 4:01.
- BYU – Will Ferrin 26-yard field goal, 0:09, Cougars 17–14. Drive: 10 plays, 72 yards, 1:51.

Third quarter

- BYU – LJ Martin 4-yard run (Will Ferrin kick), 8:54, Cougars 24–14. Drive: 10 plays, 75 yards, 6:06.
- BYU – Parker Kingston 55-yard punt return (Will Ferrin kick), 7:13, Cougars 31–14.
- UCF – Tayven Jackson 4-yard pass from Agyeman Addae (Noe Ruelas kick), 3:39, Cougars 31–21. Drive: 10 plays, 80 yards, 3:42.
- BYU – Parker Kingston 46-yard pass from Bear Bachmeier (Will Ferrin kick), 0:47, Cougars 38–21. Drive: 6 plays, 75 yards, 2:37.

Fourth quarter

- BYU – Will Ferrin 50-yard field goal, 3:53, Cougars 41–14. Drive: 7 plays, 30 yards, 3:44.

Statistics	UCF	BYU
First downs	15	21
Total yards	296	407
Rushing yards	42	118
Passing yards	254	289
Turnovers	2	0
Time of possession	24:52	35:08

Team	Category	Player	Statistics
UCF	Passing	Tayven Jackson	21/37 232 yards, 2 TD
UCF	Rushing	Myles Montgomery	7 carries, 29 yards
UCF	Receiving	Duane Thomas Jr.	4 receptions, 74 yards
BYU	Passing	Bear Bachmeier	21/25 289 yards, 1 TD
BYU	Rushing	LJ Martin	22 carries, 95 yards, 3 TD
BYU	Receiving	Parker Kingston	6 receptions, 126 yards, TD

UCF jumped out to a 14-0 lead in the first quarter, but BYU would overpower the Knights on their way to a 41-21 victory. Tayven Jackson threw two touchdown passes, and caught a touchdown pass. The Knights finished 5-7 on the season, failing to become bowl eligible for the second consecutive season. The loss was UCF's 9th straight road loss, dating back to the 2024 season.

== Personnel ==
=== Roster and coaching staff ===
==== Coaching staff additions ====
Name	Position	Old team	Old position
Scott Frost	Head coach	Los Angeles Rams	Senior Analyst
Alex Grinch	Defensive coordinator/Safeties	Wisconsin	Co-defensive coordinator/Safeties
Steve Cooper	Offensive coordinator/tight ends coach	Boise State	Asst. to Offensive coordinator/Quarterbacks
Pete Alamar	Special teams coordinator	Rice	Asst. Head coach/Special Teams coordinator
Mike Dawson	Defensive run game coordinator/Edge Rush	Kansas	Defensive Assistant
Shawn Clark	Offensive line	Appalachian State	Head coach
McKenzie Milton	Quarterbacks	Tennessee	Offensive Analyst
Jimmy Beal	Running backs	Utah State	Running backs
Mark D'Onofrio	Linebackers	Stanford	Inside Linebackers
Brandon Harris	Defensive backs	Florida Atlantic	Co-defensive coordinator/Secondary
Sean Beckton	Associate Head coach/Wide receivers	UCF*	Senior Analyst
Kenny Martin	Defensive tackles	UCF*	Defensive tackles
Travis Fisher	Senior defensive analyst	Syracuse	Cornerbacks coach
Austin Herink	Senior offensive analyst	Washington	Offensive quality control

- : retained

==== Coaching staff departures ====
Name	Position	New team	New position
Gus Malzahn	Head coach	Florida State	Offensive coordinator
Tim Harris Jr.	Offensive coordinator/wide receivers coach	Florida State	Pass game coordinator/wide receivers coach
Herb Hand	Offensive line coach	Florida State	Offensive line coach
Ernie Sims	Linebackers coach	Florida State	Assistant linebackers coach/defensive analyst
Addison Williams	Co-defensive coordinator/defensive backs coach	Nebraska	Defensive backs coach
Darin Hinshaw	Co-offensive coordinator/quarterbacks coach	Purdue	Quarterbacks coach
Brian Blackmon	Special teams coordinator/tight ends coach	ETSU	Assistant head coach/tight ends coach
Kam Martin	Run game coordinator/running backs coach	Tulsa	Associate head coach/running backs coach
Trovon Reed	Cornerbacks coach	USC	Cornerbacks coach
Ross Newton	Chief of staff/interim linebacker coach	Pelham High School	Head coach
Ted Roof	Defensive coordinator/inside linebacker coach	N/A	N/A
Kenny Ingram	Defensive ends/edge rush coach	N/A	N/A

==== Roster ====
2025 UCF Knights Football
Quarterbacks: 2 Tayven Jackson – (redshirt) Jr.; 10 Davi Belfort – (redshirt) Fr.; 11 Jacurri Brown – (redshirt) Jr.; 14 Cam Fancher – (redshirt) Sr.; 17 Brock Hansel – (redshirt) Jr.; Running backs: 4 Taevion Swint – (injured) Fr.; 5 Jaden Nixon – (redshirt) Sr.; 21 Stacy Gage – (redshirt) Fr.; 22 Myles Montgomery – (redshirt) Sr. (C); 32 Tyler Wrenn – (redshirt) Sr.; 35 Agyeman Addae – Fr.; 42 Chance Nixon – Fr.; Wide receivers: 3 Marcus Burke – (redshirt) Sr.; 6 Ric'Darious "DayDay" Farmer – (injured) So.; 7 Duane Thomas Jr. – Jr.; 8 Bredell Richardson – (redshirt) Fr.; 9 DJ Black – (redshirt) Jr.; 12 Carl Jenkins Jr. – Fr.; 13 Chris Domercant – (redshirt) Sr.; 19 Waden Charles – Fr.; 39 Andrea Parisi – (redshirt) Fr.; 81 Zack Palmer – Fr.; 82 Jordyn Bridgewater – (redshirt) Fr.; 85 Carson Hinshaw – (redshirt) Fr.; 86 Chase Hinshaw – Fr.; 87 Dwartney Wortham – (redshirt) Jr.; 89 Caleb Rollerson – (redshirt) Fr.; Tight ends: 0 Dylan Wade – Jr.; 1 Kylan Fox – So.; 18 Caden Piening – Fr.; 80 Max Drag – (redshirt) So.; 83 Dallan 'Deebo' Coleman – 5th-Sr.; 84 Thomas Wadsworth – (redshirt) Jr.	Offensive Lineman: 50 Patrick Barnett – (redshirt) 5th–Sr.; 52 Carter Miller – (redshirt) Jr.; 53 LaParka Langston – Jr.; 55 Cameron Kinnie – (redshirt) 5th–Sr.; 57 Camp Lott – Fr.; 58 Connor Meadows – (redshirt) Jr.; 61 Owen Spell – Jr.; 62 Jabari Brooks – (redshirt) 5th–Sr.; 63 Shaheem Hill – (redshirt) Jr.; 64 Gaard Memmelaar – (redshirt) 5th–Sr.; 65 Jaquez Joiner – Fr.; 66 Colin Cook – (redshirt) 5th–Sr.; 67 Noah Senka – (redshirt) Fr.; 68 Ethan Higgins – (redshirt) So.; 69 Paul Rubelt – (redshirt) 5th–Sr. (C); 70 RaiShaun McHaney – Fr.; 71 Thomas Gearity – (redshirt) Fr.; 72 Dominick Campbell – (redshirt) Jr.; 73 Jacob Maiava – Fr.; 74 Matthew Prigmore – (redshirt) So.; 75 Andrew Phelan – (redshirt) So.; 76 Justin Royes – (redshirt) So.; 77 Keegan Smith – (redshirt) Sr.; 78 Preston Cushman – (redshirt) Jr.; Kickers/Punters: 16 Noe Ruelas – (redshirt) Sr.; 31 Noah McGough – Fr.; 40 Anthony Venneri – (redshirt) Jr.; 97 Mason Denaburg – Fr.; Long snappers: 37 Rocklyn Kelley – Fr.; 47 Dalton Riggs – (redshirt) Jr.	Defensive tackles: 13 Horace Lockett – (redshirt) Jr.; 54 Trenton Turner – Fr.; 55 John Walker – (redshirt) So.; 87 Andrew Rumph – (redshirt) So.; 88 Derrick LeBlanc – (redshirt) So.; 91 Keshaun Hudson – (redshirt) Jr.; 92 Jeffson Lafontant – (redshirt) So.; 94 Rodney Lora – (redshirt) So.; 95 RJ Jackson Jr. – Jr.; 98 Tyrek'e Robinson – (redshirt) Fr.; Linebacker: 0 Keli Lawson – (redshirt) Sr. (C); 16 T.J. Bullard – (redshirt) Jr.; 20 Lewis Carter – Jr.; 28 Troy Ford Jr. – (redshirt) So.; 30 Kam Moore – (redshirt) Jr.; 32 Malakhi Boone – Fr.; 33 Phil Picciotti – (redshirt) So.; 38 Jayden McDonald – (redshirt) Sr.; 43 Cole Kozlowski – Sr.; Defensive back: 1 Ja'Cari Henderson – (redshirt) Jr.; 2 Phillip Dunnam – Sr.; 3 Tony Williams – Fr.; 4 Braeden Marshall – Jr.; 5 DJ Bell – (redshirt) Jr.; 7 Antione Jackson – Jr.; 8 Demari Henderson – (redshirt) Jr.; 11 Jaeden Gould – (redshirt) Jr.; 14 Isaiah Reed – 5th-Sr.; 17 Jaylen "AP" Heyward – So.; 18 Jakob Gude – So.; 19 Hudson Gibbs – (redshirt) So.; 23 Jayden Williams – (redshirt) Sr.; 25 Rukeem Stroud – Fr.; 26 Christian Peterson – So.; 27 Nicholas Antoine – (redshirt) Jr.; 29 Jayden Bellamy – (redshirt) Jr.; 34 Terrell Jackson – (redshirt) Jr.; 36 Chase Jarrett – (redshirt) Fr.; 49 Donnell Johnson – (redshirt) So.	Cornerbacks: 15 Jyaire Brown – (redshirt) Jr.; Defensive ends: 6 Isaiah Nixon – (redshirt) So.; 9 Nyjalik Kelly – Sr.; 10 Sincere Edwards – So.; 12 Aymeric Koumba – (redshirt) So.; 44 Josh Dorsainvil – (redshirt) Sr.; 45 Quentin Hatch – (redshirt) Jr.; 51 Malachi Lawrence – (redshirt) Sr. (C); 96 Anthony Coaxum – (redshirt) Sr.; 99 Jamaal Johnson – (redshirt) Jr.; Legend: (C) Team captain; (S) Suspended; (I) Ineligible; Injured; Redshirt; Coaching staff: Scott Frost – Head Coach; Sean Beckton Sr. – Associate head coach/Wide receivers; Alex Grinch – Defensive coordinator/Safeties; Steve Cooper – Offensive coordinator/Tight ends; Pete Alamar – Special teams coordinator; Mike Dawson – Defensive run game coordinator/Edge; Shawn Clark – Offensive line; Brandon Harris – Defensive backs; Mark D'Onofrio – Linebackers; Kenny Martin – Defensive Tackles; McKenzie Milton – Quarterbacks; Jimmy Beal – Running backs; Danny Hope – Co-Offensive Line; Austin Herink – Senior Offensive Analyst; Travis Fisher – Senior Defensive Analyst; Demeitre Brim – Defensive Analyst/Asst. Defensive Line; Drico Johnson – Defensive Analyst/Asst. Defensive backs; Jordan Johnson – Offensive Analyst/Asst. Running backs; Geron Hargon – Special Teams Quality Control/Specialist; Alex Farah – Offensive Quality Control/Asst. Offensive line; Alex Ward – Offensive Quality Control; Pete Haffner – Defensive Quality Control; Jihad Woods – Defensive Quality Control; Zach Duval – Director, Sports Performance; Andrew Strop – Associate Director, Sports Performance; Sean Beckton Jr. – Asst. Dir. of Sports Performance; Andrew Sims – Chief of Staff; Trent Mossbrucker – General Manager of Football Player Personnel, Acquisitions and Roster Management; Jeff Love – Executive Dir. of Player Personnel; Ryan Callaghan – Senior Dir. of FB Operations & Recruiting; Jeris McIntyre – Dir. High school relations; Deshon Lawrence – Senior Director of Player Development, Pro Liaison & Internal Operations; Ryan Beer – Dir. of Player Personnel; Dan Pirtle – Dir. of Player Personnel; Kaelen Skipper – Player Personnel Assistant; Lauryn Ford – Asst. Dir. of Operations; Jordan Litten – Dir. of FB Creative & Athletic Branding; Brad Helton – Asst. AD, Video Operations; Brian Lund – Associate AD. Head Football Athletic Trainer, Sports Medicine; Fred Donnell – Senior Associate Athletic Trainer; Elisabeth Bird – Athletic Trainer; Diarmuid Christie – Asst. Athletic Trainer; Kyle Flora – Asst. Athletic Trainer; Brad Anderson – Dir. of Equipment Operations; Austin Seymour – Associate Director, Equipment; Schuyler Silverglate – Asst. Director, Equipment Operations; → Roster updated August, 2025 → Depth chart updated August, 2025

== Awards and honors ==
Player	Position	Award(s)
Jaden Nixon	RB	Week 2 — Big 12 Offensive Player of the Week
Multiple players	OL	Week 4 — Big 12 Offensive Line of the Week
Multiple players	DL	Week 8 — Big 12 Defensive Line of the Week
Phillip Dunnam	DB	Week 11 — Big 12 Defensive Player of the Week
Noe Ruelas	K	Week 13 — Big 12 Special Teams Player of the Week; Lou Groza Award semifinalist

=== All-Big 12 Conference honors ===
Player	Position	Award(s)
Malachi Lawrence	DL	All-Conference First Team – Defense; Defensive Lineman of the Year (Honorable Mention)
Noe Ruelas	K	All-Conference Third Team – Offense; Special Teams Player of the Year (Honorable Mention)
Cole Kozlowski	LB	All-Conference Third Team – Defense; Defensive Newcomer of the Year (Honorable Mention)
Jayden Bellamy	DB	All-Conference Honorable Mention – Defense
Phillip Dunnam	DB	All-Conference Honorable Mention – Defense
RJ Jackson Jr.	DL	All-Conference Honorable Mention – Defense
Nyjalik Kelly	DL	All-Conference Honorable Mention – Defense
Duane Thomas Jr.	WR	All-Conference Honorable Mention – Offense
Dylan Wade	TE/FLEX	All-Conference Honorable Mention – Offense
