= Tayven Jackson =

American football player (born 2004)

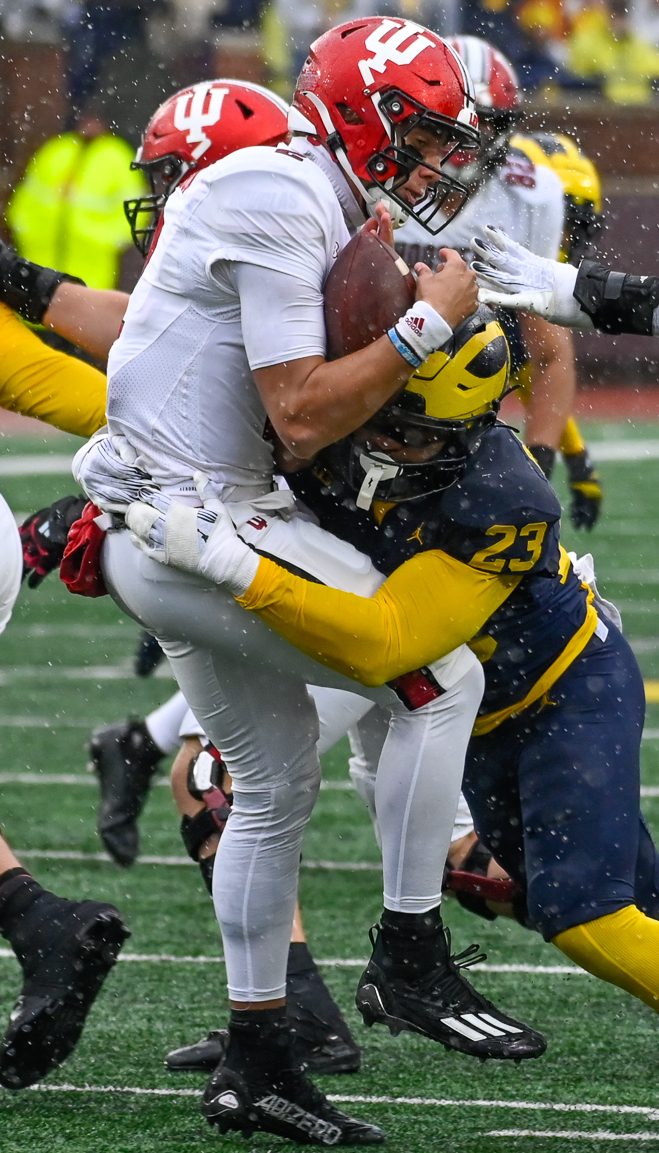
- Jackson with Indiana in 2023

No. 2 – North Texas Mean Green
- Position: Quarterback
- Class: (redshirt) Senior

Personal information
- Born: January 5, 2004 (age 22)
- Listed height: 6 ft 4 in (1.93 m)
- Listed weight: 212 lb (96 kg)

Career information
- High school: Center Grove (Greenwood, Indiana)
- College: Tennessee (2022); Indiana (2023–2024); UCF (2025); North Texas (2026–present)
- Stats at ESPN

Tayven Jackson (born January 5, 2004) is an American college football quarterback for the North Texas Mean Green. He previously played for the Tennessee Volunteers, Indiana Hoosiers and UCF Knights.

== Early life ==
Jackson attended Center Grove High School in Greenwood, Indiana. During his career, he passed for 4,813 yards and 47 touchdowns. He committed to the University of Tennessee to play college football.

== College career ==
=== Tennessee ===
Jackson began his true freshman season as the third-string quarterback behind Hendon Hooker and Joe Milton, splitting time with Gaston Moore. He made his collegiate debut in Tennessee's season-opening win over Ball State. In Week 3 against Akron, Jackson scored his first collegiate touchdown on a 1-yard run in the win. He appeared in three games during the season, completing three of four passes for 37 yards and rushing for 10 yards on four carries with one touchdown, allowing him to preserve his redshirt. On January 13, 2023, Jackson entered the NCAA transfer portal.

=== Indiana ===
On January 15, 2023, Jackson transferred to Indiana. He competed with Brendan Sorsby for the starting quarterback job, with head coach Tom Allen ultimately naming Sorsby the starter. Jackson made his Hoosiers debut in the season opener against No. 3 Ohio State, completing one of five passes for 24 yards in the loss. He started the following week against Indiana State, completing 18 of 21 passes for 236 yards and rushing for a touchdown in a 41–7 win. In Week 3 against Louisville, Jackson threw for a season-high 299 yards with one touchdown and one interception in a 21–14 loss. The following week against Akron, he completed 11 of 26 passes for 190 yards with one touchdown and one interception and threw the game-winning two-point conversion in a 29–27 four-overtime victory. Following losses to Maryland and Michigan, in which Jackson threw three combined interceptions without a touchdown, he was replaced by Sorsby. Walt Bell was fired as offensive coordinator following the loss to Maryland, while Allen was fired at the conclusion of the season. Jackson did not appear in another game. He finished the season having appeared in six games with five starts, completing 78 of 128 passes for 914 yards, two touchdowns, and five interceptions, while rushing for a touchdown.

In 2024, Sorsby transferred to Cincinnati. Under new head coach Curt Cignetti, Jackson competed with Ohio transfer Kurtis Rourke for the starting quarterback position and was named the primary backup ahead of Alberto Mendoza. Jackson appeared in the season-opening win over FIU but did not record any statistics. The following week against Western Illinois, he completed all three of his passes for 104 yards and rushed for a touchdown in the victory. In Week 7 against Nebraska, Rourke left the game with an injury, and Jackson completed seven of eight passes for 91 yards and two touchdowns in a 56–7 win. Jackson started the following week against Washington in place of the injured Rourke, completing 11 of 19 passes for 124 yards with a touchdown and an interception while rushing for a touchdown in a 31–17 win. On the season, he appeared in seven games with one start, completing 23 of 37 passes for 349 yards, four touchdowns, and one interception, while rushing for 73 yards and three touchdowns, as Indiana finished 11–2 and made its first appearance in the College Football Playoff. On December 21, 2024, Jackson entered the transfer portal for the second time.

=== UCF ===
On January 3, 2025, Jackson transferred to UCF. He competed with Cam Fancher for the starting quarterback position, with head coach Scott Frost naming Fancher the starter entering the season, while Jackson was listed as the primary backup ahead of Jacurri Brown. Fancher was injured in the second quarter of the season opener against Jacksonville State, and Jackson replaced him, completing 17 of 24 passes for 282 yards and two touchdowns in a 17–10 win. Jackson threw two fourth-quarter touchdown passes, including the go-ahead score with just over a minute remaining. He then led the Knights to wins over North Carolina A&T and North Carolina before losses to Kansas State and Kansas. Jackson suffered a strained AC joint in his left shoulder during the loss to Kansas State and aggravated the injury against Kansas the following week, causing him to miss the Week 6 game against Cincinnati, a 20–11 loss. Jackson returned as the starter against West Virginia, completing 23 of 34 passes for 277 yards and two touchdowns in a 45–13 win. UCF then lost three consecutive games to Baylor, Houston, and No. 6 Texas Tech, with Jackson throwing one touchdown and four interceptions during the stretch. Against Oklahoma State, Jackson led a comeback from a 14–0 deficit, throwing two second-half touchdown passes before UCF won 17–14 on a game-winning field goal with 57 seconds remaining. In the regular-season finale against No. 11 BYU, Jackson threw for 232 yards and two touchdowns and caught his first career receiving touchdown on a trick play in a 41–21 loss. UCF finished the season 5–7 and did not qualify for a bowl game. Jackson appeared in 11 games with 10 starts, completing 200 of 315 passes for 2,151 yards, 10 touchdowns, and eight interceptions, while rushing for 85 yards and three touchdowns. On December 3, 2025, Jackson entered the transfer portal for the third time.

=== North Texas ===
On January 12, 2026, Jackson transferred to North Texas. He competed with East Carolina transfer Chaston Ditta for the starting quarterback job. Prior to the start of the 2026 season, head coach Neal Brown named Jackson the starter, marking the first time he entered a season as the named starting quarterback. In the season opener, Jackson faced his former team and defending national champion Indiana, completing 22 of 28 passes for 192 yards and an interception in a 52–16 loss. The team rebounded the following week, as Jackson led the Mean Green to a 44–6 win over UNLV, completing 15 of 26 passes for 233 yards and two touchdowns while rushing for a touchdown. The following week against Texas State, he threw for a career-high 492 yards on 42 of 56 passing with three touchdowns and an interception in a 49–35 loss, the fourth-highest single-game passing total in North Texas history. In Week 4 against Houston Christian, Jackson completed 16 of 18 passes for 270 yards and a touchdown in a 63–14 win. His 88.9% completion percentage was the second-highest in program history for a game with at least 10 pass attempts.

=== Statistics ===
Year	Team	Games			Passing								Rushing			
Year	Team	GP	GS	Record	Cmp	Att	Pct	Yds	Y/A	TD	Int	Rtg	Att	Yds	Avg	TD
2022	Tennessee	3	0	—	3	4	75.0	37	9.3	0	0	152.7	4	10	2.5	1
2023	Indiana	6	5	2–3	78	128	60.9	914	7.1	2	5	118.3	28	−21	−0.8	1
2024	Indiana	7	1	1–0	23	37	62.2	349	9.4	4	1	171.7	15	73	4.9	3
2025	UCF	11	10	4–6	200	315	63.5	2,151	6.8	10	8	126.2	54	85	1.6	3
2026	North Texas	9	9	7–2	211	298	70.8	2,880	9.7	23	5	174.1	25	98	2.8	4
Career		36	25	14–11	515	782	65.9	6,331	8.1	39	19	145.5	136	245	1.8	12

== Personal life ==
His brother, Trayce Jackson-Davis, played college basketball at Indiana and currently plays for the Toronto Raptors in the NBA. His father, Ray Jackson, was a cornerback for the Washington State Cougars football team and played three years in the National Football League; he was also part of the former team who lost in the 1998 Rose Bowl.
