= Tyshun Render =

American football player (born 1997)

Profile
- Position: Defensive end

Personal information
- Born: March 28, 1997 (age 29); Newnan, Georgia, U.S.
- Listed height: 6 ft 4 in (1.93 m)
- Listed weight: 245 lb (111 kg)

Career information
- High school: Westlake (Atlanta, Georgia)
- College: Middle Tennessee (2015–2019)
- NFL draft: 2020: undrafted

Career history
- Miami Dolphins (2020); New Jersey Generals (2022–2023); Memphis Showboats (2024); Hamilton Tiger-Cats (2025)*; Massachusetts Pirates (2025)
- * Offseason or practice squad member only

Career NFL statistics
- Games played: 1
- Stats at Pro Football Reference

Tyshun Scott Render (born March 28, 1997) is an American professional football defensive end. He played college football at Middle Tennessee. He has also played for the Miami Dolphins of the National Football League (NFL), and the New Jersey Generals of the United States Football League (USFL).

== College career ==
Render played four years at Middle Tennessee, where he played in 51 games recording over 119 tackles, and 6.5 sacks.

On February 26, 2020, just before the NFL Combine, New England Patriots Head Coach Bill Belichick traveled to Middle Tennessee for a private workout with Render. The session was arranged through Belichick’s connection with Middle Tennessee’s quarterbacks coach Tony Franklin. After expressing interest, Belichick made the trip where he ran drills with Render, and broke down game film.

== Professional career ==
=== Miami Dolphins ===
After going undrafted in the 2020 NFL draft, Render was signed by the Miami Dolphins as an undrafted free agent on April 25, 2020. He was waived during final roster cuts on September 5, 2020, and signed to the practice squad two days later. He was elevated to the active roster on October 10 and December 12 for the team's weeks 5 and 14 games against the San Francisco 49ers and Kansas City Chiefs, and reverted to the practice squad after each game. He was placed on the practice squad/COVID-19 list by the team on December 17, 2020, and restored to the practice squad on December 30. He signed a reserve/future contract with the Dolphins on January 5, 2021.

On August 31, 2021, Render was waived by the Dolphins.

=== New Jersey Generals ===
On March 10, 2022, Render was drafted by the New Jersey Generals of the United States Football League. He was placed on the team's suspended list on May 31, 2023. He re-signed with the team on September 30, 2023, but remained on the suspended list. The Generals folded when the XFL and USFL merged to create the United Football League (UFL).

=== Memphis Showboats ===
On January 5, 2024, Render was selected by the Memphis Showboats during the 2024 UFL dispersal draft. He re-signed with the team on August 27, 2024. He was released on January 22, 2025.

=== Hamilton Tiger-Cats ===
On March 18, 2025, Render signed with the Hamilton Tiger-Cats. However, he was part of the final cuts on June 1, 2025.

=== Massachusetts Pirates ===
On July 20, 2025, Render signed with the Massachusetts Pirates of the Indoor Football League (IFL).
