= Westlake High School (Georgia) =

Public high school in Fulton County, Georgia, United States

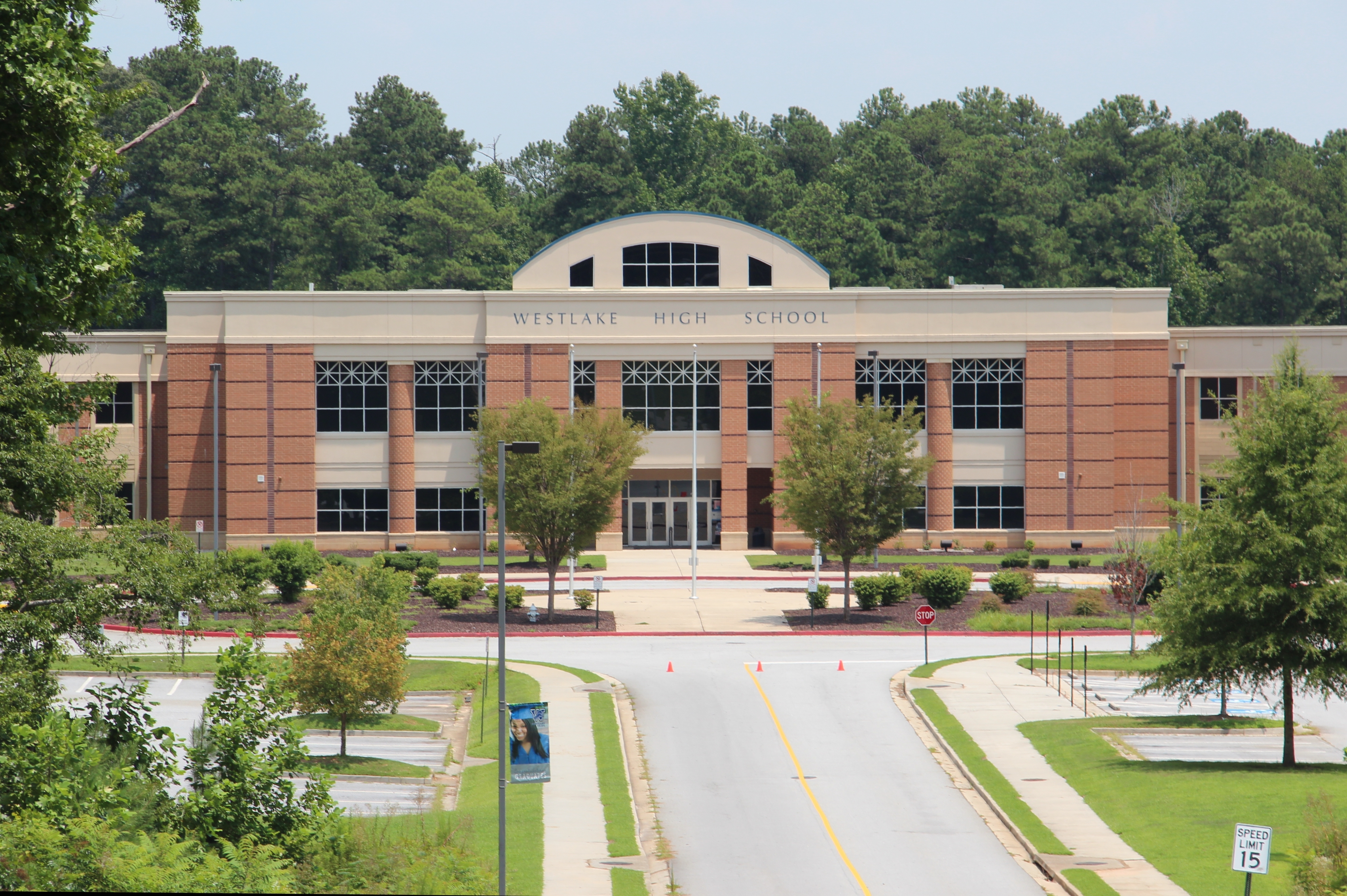

Location
- 2400 Union Road S.W. Atlanta, Georgia 30331; United States; 33°41′30″N 84°34′45″W

Information
- Type: Public high school secondary school
- Founded: 1988
- School board: Fulton County Schools
- NCES District ID: 1302280
- Superintendent: Jeff Rose
- CEEB code: 110258
- NCES School ID: 130228001031
- Principal: Miranda Freeman
- Staff: 112.50 (FTE)
- Grades: 9–12
- Gender: Co-educational
- Enrollment: 2,156 (2023–2024)
- Student to teacher ratio: 19.16
- Campus type: Rural
- Colors: Blue, silver, and white
- Athletics conference: Georgia High School Association (GHSA)
- Mascot: Lion
- Nickname: Lions
- Feeder schools: Sandtown Middle School, Camp Creek Middle School
- Website: Westlake High School

Westlake High School is a four-year comprehensive public high school located in South Fulton, Georgia (with an Atlanta mailing address) and is accredited by the Georgia Department of Education and Southern Association of Colleges and Schools.

== History ==
As a part of the Fulton County School System consolidation plan, Westlake was formed in 1988 by the closing of Westwood and Lakeshore High Schools. The new school used the old Westwood facility until 2008, when Westlake moved into a new state-of-the-art school next to the old campus. Feeder schools include Sandtown Middle School and Camp Creek Middle School.

In the 2012-13 school year, the school received favorable media coverage when CNN's HLN news broadcast a feature segment on then Westlake principal Dr. Grant Rivera and his efforts in engaging students, parents, and faculty in achieving academic and extra-curricular success in today's challenging social environment.

In 2016 the old campus was used for exterior and interior shots for the Lionsgate film, Middle School: The Worst Years of My Life.

In 2019, the academic growth rate for Westlake students was higher than 95% of schools in the state and was above the state average in college readiness.

In 2020 Principal Jamar Robinson and his wife both drowned while on vacation.

In 2023, 350 ninth and tenth-grade students were withdrawn from Westlake due to residency eligibility issues. The school was facing significant overcrowding, with enrollment exceeding capacity by 500 students. As a result, an analysis of student addresses was conducted to determine whether they resided within the Westlake school zone.

== Magnet program ==
Westlake's Math/Science Magnet Program prepares students for the academic and career fields of science, technology, engineering, and math (STEM) through rigorous instruction, relevant experiences, and supportive relationships.

=== Goals ===
The magnet program at Westlake seeks to provide an academically rigorous foundation for math, science, engineering, and media-based careers. Students are exposed to courses that offer real-world problems and inquiry-based instruction. The program develops partnerships with universities and businesses so that students have access to relevant instructional and internship experiences in medical science, engineering, and media. Students are also encouraged to participate in academic, athletic, and artistic extracurricular activities that support their achievement.

=== Application requirements ===
Students wishing to participate in the magnet program must live in Fulton County and must meet academic criteria, including having taken Algebra I in 8th grade, having a minimum grade of 80/100 in all math and science classes, failing no classes, and having a minimum cumulative average of 80.

=== Magnet programs of study ===
Westlake's magnet program is modeled after college programs in medical science, engineering, and computer science. Each course of study has associated extracurricular clubs and teams, as well as junior and senior summer research internship opportunities available at both Georgia Institute of Technology and Emory University. Students attend monthly forums with guest speakers from college and industry on topics ranging from college planning to careers.

=== Recent achievements ===
- National 1st place Biology Award in NAACP ACT-SO competition
- National 2nd place Science Award in National Institutes of Health competition
- Regional Semi-Finalists Engineering Award in Siemens Westinghouse Competition
- Regional 1st place Tri-Math-Alon Award in National Society of Black Engineers competition

== Athletics programs ==
=== Boys' basketball ===
- 1999 GHSA Boys' Basketball Champions
- 2002 GHSA Boys' Basketball Champions
- 2016 GHSA AAAAAA Boys' Basketball Champions

=== Girls' basketball ===
- 2018 GHSA AAAAAAA Girls' Basketball Champions
- 2019 GHSA AAAAAA Girls' Basketball Champions
- 2020 GHSA AAAAA Girls' Basketball Champions
- 2021 GHSA AAAAA Girls' Basketball Champions
- 2021 Geico Nationals Girls' Basketball Champions

=== Girls' track and field ===
- 2009 GHSA AAAAA Girls' Track Champions
- 2013 GHSA AAAAAA Girls' Track and Field Champions
- 2014 GHSA AAAAAA Girls' Track and Field Champions
- 2015 GHSA AAAAAA Girls' Track and Field Champions

=== Dance ===
- 2012 UDA Jazz Dance Large Group Champions
- 2012 UDA Hip-Hop Dance Large Group Champions

== New facility ==
Construction for a new Westlake facility began in October 2006 and the facility officially opened in August 2008, housing over 2,500 high school students in 99 classrooms. The architectural firm of Gardner, Spencer, Smith, Tench & Jarbeau, P.C. designed the new building while H.J. Russell & Company handled the initial phase of construction. The school had previously been housed in the old Westlake High School building since its opening in 1988. Prior to 1988, the building housed Westwood High School. The MTV show Finding Carter was filmed at the older facility, adjacent to the new one.

== Notable alumni ==
- Keith Adams, football player
- Ian Allen, football player
- Lawrence Butler, baseball player, outfielder
- Christian Coleman, USA Track and Field Olympian
- Christopher Eubanks, tennis player
- Keyaron Fox, football player, Super Bowl XLIII champion
- Marquis Grissom, baseball player Montreal Expos, Atlanta Braves, Cleveland Indians (as Lakeshore High School)
- Edwin Jackson, football player
- Raven Johnson, basketball player, point guard South Carolina Gamecocks
- Adam "Pacman" Jones, football player
- LaDawn Jones, attorney and former member of the Georgia House of Representatives
- Sean Jones, football player
- Lash Legend, professional wrestler
- Horace Lockett, college football defensive tackle for the UCF Knights
- Wallace Miles, football player
- Anthony Mitchell, football player, Super Bowl XXXV champion
- Cam Newton, football player, Carolina Panthers, 2010 Heisman Trophy winner, 2015 NFL MVP
- Sidi Njie, USA Track & Field U20 Gold medalist
- Chuma Okeke, professional basketball player, Orlando Magic
- Quincy Olivari, basketball player
- Kasim Reed, attorney and 59th Mayor of Atlanta (as Westwood High School)
- Tyshun Render, NFL player
- Micah Robinson, NFL player
- Darius Saint-Robinson, football player
- Vince Staples, musician (attended for a year)
- Chris Tavarez, actor
- A. J. Terrell, football player, Atlanta Falcons
- Avieon Terrell, football player, Atlanta Falcons
- Jai'Den Thomas, college football player
- Marcus Thornton, former basketball player for the University of Georgia
- Kiante Tripp, football player
- Chance Warmack, football player
- Nate Wiggins, cornerback Baltimore Ravens
- Malik Willis, quarterback Miami Dolphins
- Ray Willis, basketball player
- Zion Young, college football player
