= Steve Cooper (American football) =

American football coach (born 1986)

Current position
- Title: Offensive coordinator
- Team: UCF
- Conference: Big 12

Biographical details
- Born: April 3, 1986 (age 40); Myrtle Point, Oregon, U.S.
- Education: Portland State University

Playing career
- 2004–2005: Southern Oregon
- 2005–2006: Oregon State
- 2007–2008: Portland State
- Position: Wide receiver

Coaching career (HC unless noted)
- 2009: Portland State (GA)
- 2010: Portland State (TE)
- 2011–2014: Portland State (WR)
- 2015–2017: Portland State (OC/QB)
- 2018–2020: Nebraska (OQC)
- 2021: Nebraska (Interim QB)
- 2022: Nebraska (Sr.OA)
- 2023: Maine (OC/QB)
- 2024: Boise State (Asst. to OC/QB/OA)
- 2025: UCF (OC/TE)
- 2026–present: UCF (OC)

Steve Cooper (born April 3, 1986) is an American college football coach who is currently the offensive coordinator for the UCF Knights. He previously coached at Boise State in 2024, and has held coordinator roles at Portland State and Maine prior.

== Playing career ==
Cooper began his collegiate career at Southern Oregon before transferring to Oregon State, where he was a member of the team in 2005 and 2006. He then transferred to Portland State, where he played wide receiver from 2007 to 2008. During those seasons, he was part of the top-ranked passing offense in the FCS. He graduated from Portland State in 2009 with a Bachelor of Science degree in philosophy.

== Coaching career ==
=== Portland State ===
Cooper began his coaching career at his alma mater, Portland State, serving as a graduate assistant in 2009. He was promoted to tight ends coach in 2010, where he developed Julius Thomas, a former basketball player who had not played collegiate football prior, into an All-conference selection. Thomas was later drafted into the NFL by the Denver Broncos and earned two Pro Bowl honors. Cooper then coached the wide receivers from 2011 to 2014 before being elevated to offensive coordinator and quarterbacks coach in 2015, a role he held through 2017. In his first season as offensive coordinator, Portland State defeated Washington State (Pac-12) and North Texas (CUSA) —becoming the first FCS program to defeat two FBS teams in the same season since 2007. The 66–7 win over North Texas produced a 59-point margin of victory, the largest by an FCS team over an FBS opponent since the 1978 FBS/FCS division split. The Vikings made a playoff appearance that year and finished #10 in rankings.

=== Nebraska ===
In 2018 Cooper joined Scott Frost’s staff at Nebraska as an offensive quality control coach. He remained with the Huskers through 2022, serving as interim quarterbacks coach in 2021, when he also called plays for the final two games of the season, and served as senior offensive analyst in 2022.

=== Maine ===
Cooper was hired as offensive coordinator and quarterbacks coach at Maine in January 2023. Under his direction the Black Bears ranked 10th nationally in FCS passing offense.

=== Boise State ===
He spent the 2024 season as an offensive analyst, assistant to the offensive coordinator, and quarterbacks coach at Boise State, which won the Mountain West Conference title and earned a berth in the College Football Playoff as the No. 3 seed. That season featured Heisman Trophy finalist Ashton Jeanty, who won the Maxwell Award and Doak Walker Award.

=== UCF ===
On December 11, 2024, Cooper was named offensive coordinator at UCF under head coach Scott Frost. He also coached the tight ends during the 2025 season before focusing solely on the offensive coordinator role beginning in 2026.
