= Jyaire Brown =

American football player (born 2004)

No. 3 – Southern Miss Golden Eagles
- Position: Cornerback
- Class: Senior

Personal information
- Born: February 15, 2004 (age 22)
- Listed height: 5 ft 11 in (1.80 m)
- Listed weight: 180 lb (82 kg)

Career information
- High school: Lakota West (West Chester, Ohio)
- College: Ohio State (2022–2023); LSU (2024); UCF (2025); Southern Miss (2026–present)
- Stats at ESPN

Jyaire Brown (born February 15, 2004) is an American college football cornerback for the Southern Miss Golden Eagles. He previously played for the Ohio State Buckeyes, the LSU Tigers and the UCF Knights.

== Early life ==
Brown attended Warren Easton Charter High School for two years before transferring to Lakota West High School during his junior year. As a senior, he had 26 receptions for 416 yards and four touchdowns, as well as five interceptions. Coming out of high school, Brown was rated as a four-star recruit, the 19th best cornerback, and the 155th overall player in the class of 2022. Brown committed to play college football for the Ohio State Buckeyes over offers from schools such as Alabama, LSU, and Mississippi State.

== College career ==
=== Ohio State ===
In week 4 of the 2022 season, Brown got his first career start versus Wisconsin where he notched a tackle and broke up a pass. He finished his freshman season in 2022 playing in ten games, where he totaled eight tackles, three pass deflections, and a forced fumble. In 2023, Brown played in just four games making one tackle. After the 2023, Brown entered his name into the NCAA transfer portal.

=== LSU ===
Brown transferred to continue his career with the LSU Tigers.

On December 9, 2024, Brown announced that he would enter the transfer portal for the second time.

=== UCF ===
On December 29, 2024, Brown announced that he would transfer to UCF.

On December 4, 2025, Brown announced that he would enter the transfer portal for the third time.

=== Southern Miss ===
On January 13, 2026, Brown announced that he would transfer to Southern Miss.
