= Cam Fancher =

American football player

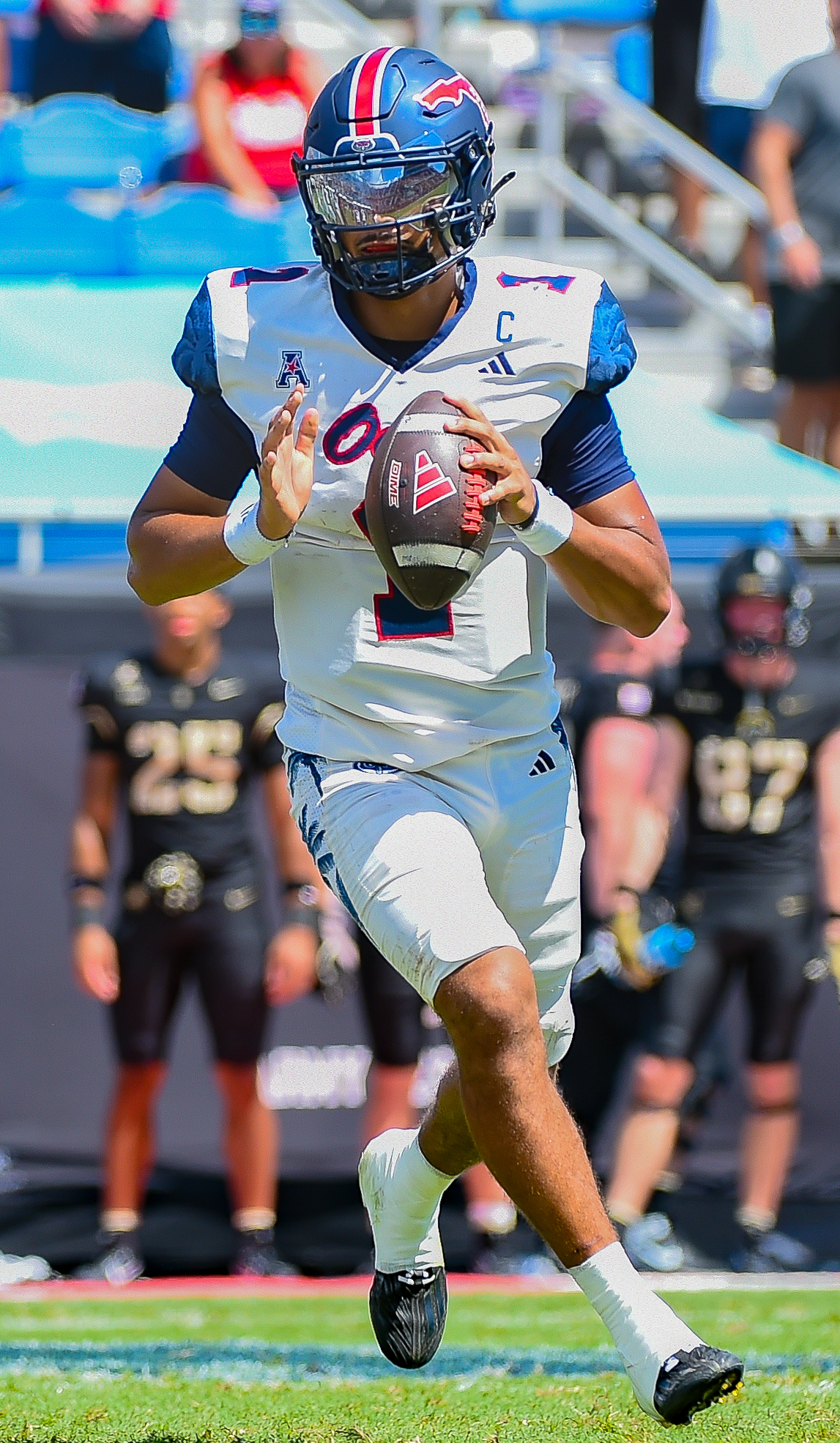
- Fancher with Florida Atlantic in 2024

No. 2 – Michigan State Spartans
- Position: Quarterback
- Class: Sixth Year

Personal information
- Listed height: 6 ft 2 in (1.88 m)
- Listed weight: 207 lb (94 kg)

Career information
- High school: Wayne (Huber Heights, Ohio)
- College: Marshall (2021–2023); Florida Atlantic (2024); UCF (2025); Michigan State (2026–present)
- Stats at ESPN

Cameron Fancher is an American college football quarterback for the Michigan State Spartans. He previously played for the Marshall Thundering Herd, Florida Atlantic Owls and UCF Knights.

== Early life ==
Fancher grew up in Huber Heights, Ohio and attended Wayne High School where he lettered in football, basketball and track & field. He was rated a three-star recruit and committed to play college football at Marshall over offers from Georgia State, Austin Peay, Eastern Illinois, Eastern Kentucky, Fordham, Georgetown and Murray State.

== College career ==
=== Marshall ===
During Fancher's true freshman season in 2021, he appeared in two games against North Carolina Central and FIU finishing the season with completing three out of six passing attempts for 46 passing yards and 18 rushing yards on five carries. During the 2022 season, he appeared in all 13 games and was named as the starting quarterback midway through the season. He finished the season with completing 131 out of 235 passing attempts for 1,558 yards, 10 touchdowns and six interceptions.

On December 6, 2023, Fancher announced that he would be entering the NCAA transfer portal.

=== Florida Atlantic ===
On December 22, 2023, Fancher announced that he would be transferring to Florida Atlantic.

He was named as the starting quarterback for the 2024 season.

On December 15, 2024, Fancher announced that he would enter the transfer portal for the second time.

=== UCF ===
On December 20, 2024, Fancher transferred to the UCF Knights.

He was named as the starting quarterback for the 2025 season.

On January 3, 2026, Fancher announced that he would enter the transfer portal for the third time.

=== Michigan State ===
On January 6, 2026, Fancher announced that he would transfer to Michigan State.

=== Statistics ===
Year	Team	Games			Passing								Rushing			
Year	Team	GP	GS	Record	Comp	Att	Pct	Yards	Avg	TD	Int	Rate	Att	Yards	Avg	TD
2021	Marshall	2	0	0–0	3	6	50.0	46	7.7	0	0	114.4	5	18	3.6	0
2022	Marshall	13	7	6–1	131	235	55.7	1,558	6.6	10	6	120.4	107	466	4.4	1
2023	Marshall	10	10	5–5	202	309	65.4	2,162	7.0	11	11	128.8	120	273	2.3	4
2024	Florida Atlantic	9	9	2–7	126	212	59.4	1,528	7.2	6	6	123.7	99	365	3.7	3
2025	UCF	3	2	1–1	41	72	56.9	333	4.6	0	0	95.8	31	170	5.5	1
2026	Michigan State	5	0	0–0	8	11	72.7	59	5.4	0	1	99.9	10	27	2.7	1
Career		42	28	14–14	511	844	60.5	5,686	6.7	27	24	122.0	372	1,319	3.5	10
