= Jaden Nixon =

American football player (born 2002)

Profile
- Position: Running back

Personal information
- Born: September 19, 2002 (age 24); Dallas, Texas, U.S.
- Listed height: 5 ft 10 in (1.78 m)
- Listed weight: 199 lb (90 kg)

Career information
- High school: Lone Star (Frisco, Texas)
- College: Oklahoma State (2021–2023); Western Michigan (2024); UCF (2025)
- NFL draft: 2026: undrafted

Career history
- Green Bay Packers (2026)*
- * Offseason or practice squad member only

Awards and highlights
- First team All-MAC (2024)

Jaden Nixon (born September 19, 2002) is an American professional football running back. He played college football for the Oklahoma State Cowboys, the UCF Knights and the Western Michigan Broncos. He was signed as an undrafted free agent by the Packers in 2026.

== Early life ==
Nixon attended Lone Star High School in Frisco, Texas, and committed to play college football for the Oklahoma State Cowboys, over offers from other schools such as North Texas, Tulsa, Nevada, Air Force, Army, and Navy.

== College career ==
=== Oklahoma State ===
As a freshman in 2021, Nixon ran for 122 yards and a touchdown on 14 carries. In the 2022 season opener, he totaled 31 yards and a touchdown in a victory versus Central Michigan. In week 6, Nixon returned a kickoff 98 yards for a touchdown in a win over Baylor. He finished the 2022 season with 46 carries for 181 rushing yards to go with 21 receptions for 189 receiving yards and three touchdowns. In the 2023 regular season finale, Nixon got a crucial first-down conversion late into the game to help upset BYU 40-34 in double overtime. In the 2023 season, he rushed 50 times for 197 yards and a touchdown. After the season he entered the NCAA transfer portal.

=== Western Michigan ===
Nixon transferred to play for the Western Michigan Broncos. During his lone season as a Bronco in 2024, he rushed 919 yards and 12 touchdowns on 143 carries. After the season, Nixon once again entered the NCAA transfer portal.

=== UCF ===
Nixon transferred to play for the UCF Knights. In 2025, he played in all 12 games, racking up 554 yards and seven touchdowns on 71 carries, while also bringing in 17 passes for 88 yards.

== Professional career ==
Pre-draft measurables
Height	Weight	Arm length	Hand span	Wingspan	40-yard dash	10-yard split	20-yard split	20-yard shuttle	Three-cone drill	Vertical jump	Broad jump	Bench press
5 ft 9 1/8 in (1.76 m)	199 lb (90 kg)	30 in (0.76 m)	8 7/8 in (0.23 m)	5 ft 11 in (1.80 m)	4.55 s	1.59 s	2.65 s	4.36 s	7.46 s	31.0 in (0.79 m)	9 ft 4 in (2.84 m)	18 reps
All values from Pro Day

Nixon was signed as an undrafted free agent by the Green Bay Packers after the conclusion of the 2026 NFL draft. On August 30, 2026, he was released by the Packers as a part of final roster cuts.

== Personal life ==
Nixon is the son of former Oklahoma State football player, Jeroid Johnson and Oklahoma State track star, Tina Nixon. He is also the cousin of former all-pro NFL running back Adrian Peterson.
