= Austin Herink =

American football player and coach (born 1995)

UCF Knights
- Title: Senior offensive analyst

Personal information
- Born: August 16, 1995 (age 31)
- Listed height: 6 ft 2 in (1.88 m)
- Listed weight: 205 lb (93 kg)

Career information
- High school: Cleveland (TN)
- College: Middle Tennessee State (2014); East Tennessee State (2015–2018)
- NFL draft: 2019: undrafted

Career history

Playing
- Vienna Vikings

Coaching
- Vienna Vikings (2019) Passing game coordinator & quarterbacks coach; East Tennessee State (2019–2020) Offensive quality control; Nebraska (2021–2022) Associate director of football operations; Arizona (2023) Analyst for the head coach; Washington (2024) Offensive quality control; UCF (2025–present) Senior offensive analyst

Austin David Herink (born August 16, 1995) is an American football coach and former quarterback, who is currently the senior offensive analyst for the UCF Knights. He played college football at East Tennessee State. After going undrafted in the 2019 NFL draft, Herink signed with the Vienna Vikings for the spring 2019 season. He subsequently retired, became an assistant coach at East Tennessee State, and briefly at Vienna Vikings. He is one of the most prolific quarterbacks in the history of East Tennessee State. He led the 2018 team to the third-best record in school history and the program's first playoff game in over 20 years, as well as a share of the Southern Conference Championship. He was also a four-time team captain from 2015 to 2018.

== Early life ==
Herink was born to Jeff and Donita Herink and grew up in Cleveland, Tennessee, where he played football for coach Ron Crawford at Cleveland High School. He also won letters in basketball. In his career, he passed for over 6,000 yards, combined for 67 touchdowns (52 passing/15 rushing) and completed 66.8 percent (472-of-706) of his passes. He was named District Player of the Year and an All-State selection.

== College career ==
During his recruiting process, Herink was not offered by many schools. He was ranked a two-star prospect. Though he was originally recruited by ETSU, the team ultimately signed another quarterback. Before committing to MTSU he was recruited by UT Martin, Eastern Kentucky and Youngstown State. Most noticeably were the D1 SEC schools that had an interest such as Alabama, Auburn, UTK and Vanderbilt. However, none offered Herink a scholarship during the recruiting process. After graduation from Cleveland High School, Herink joined the Middle Tennessee State football team in 2014. One year later, he transferred to East Tennessee State to help reboot their football team in the 2015 and where there would be plenty of playing time. There would start for all four years (2015-2018) and become one of the best quarterbacks in the school's history. While at ETSU, Herink studied sports management.

=== 2015 season ===
In 2015, Herink started all 11 games at quarterback for the Bucs and was named to the SoCon Academic Honor Roll. He led the team in completions (116), passing yards (1,261), passing touchdowns (6) and completion percentage (60.4). He also rushed for 155 yards and five touchdowns. He earned two Bowman Jewelers Offensive Player of the Week honors (Maryville and Kentucky Wesleyan). He totaled a season-high 261 passing yards against Emory and Henry (Sept. 26). He rushed for a season-best 134 yards in the win over Kentucky Wesleyan (Nov. 21), as well as rushing for two touchdowns and threw for three scores with 220 passing yards against the Panthers. In that game, he completed 14 of his 17 passes vs. KWC. He would also go 10-of-13 at Charleston Southern (September 17) and 11-for-15 vs. Maryville (September 10). He threw and rushed for one touchdown in the win over Warner (October 31).

=== 2016 season ===
In 2016, Herink was named to SoCon All-Academic Team and SoCon Honor Roll. He was named SoCon Offensive Player of the Week following ETSU’s win over Western Carolina at Bristol Motor Speedway (Sept. 17) He would once again start all 11 games at quarterback for the Blue & Gold. He would pass for 1,695 yards and seven touchdowns with a completion percentage of .596 (161-for-270) and rushed for 106 yards and three touchdowns. He Ranked seventh in the SoCon in passing yards per game (154.1), passing efficiency (115.0) and total offense per game (163.7). He would pass for a then career-high 269 yards and three touchdowns in the Bucs’ win over Western Carolina, as well as set a career high in completions (25) at Mercer (Nov. 5). He recorded at least one touchdown pass in the Bucs’ final four games of the season (The Citadel, Mercer, Cumberland and No. 18 Samford). He also rushed for two touchdowns in the win over West Virginia Wesleyan (Oct. 20).

=== 2017 season ===
In the 2017 season, he was named to the SoCon Fall Academic Team and SoCon Honor Roll, as well as being named SoCon Student-Athlete of the Week on September 27. He broke ETSU’s single-game passing record with a 434-yard game at Furman on Sept. 30 and ranked among the Bucs’ single-season leaders in pass attempts (322, 4th), completions (182, 5th), passing yards (2,213, 6th) and passing touchdowns (14, T-7th). He ranked fifth in the SoCon in total offense (201.7) and total offensive touchdowns (15). He tied a career-high with three touchdown passes in the season-opening win against Limestone and Furman, and set a new single-game program record by completing 15 straight passes to start against Limestone. The longest pass of his career would also occur against Furman with a 78-yard pass.

=== 2018 season ===
Herink would define his career in 2018, as he would lead East Tennessee State to the FCS playoffs for the first time since 1996 and to their first-ever share of the SoCon championship. He was once again named to the SoCon Honor Roll and SoCon Fall Academic Team. He concluded the season with 1,825 passing yards with six touchdowns in 11 games played (eight starts). Two of his six touchdown passes were a season-high 54 yards (vs. Furman (Sept. 22) and Chattanooga (Sept. 29)). Capped off the year with a .591 (156-of-264) completion percentage, completing a season-high 28 passes and 294 yards against Western Carolina (Oct. 27). He tallied 174 yards on the ground in 74 attempts with four touchdowns, and would rank fifth in the SoCon in total offense with 1,999 yards. He finished his career ranked second in program history in pass attempts (1,048), completions (615) and completion percentage (.587), while ranking third in yards (6,994) and fifth in touchdowns (33).

=== College statistics ===
Season	Team	GP	Passing									Rushing				
Season	Team	GP	Cmp	Att	Pct	Yds	Avg	Lng	TD	Int	Rtg	Att	Yds	Avg	Lng	TD
2014	Middle Tennessee State	Redshirt														
2015	East Tennessee State	11	116	192	60.4	1,261	6.6	56	6	5	120.7	88	155	1.8	40	5
2016	East Tennessee State	11	161	270	59.6	1,695	6.3	69	7	8	115.0	97	106	1.1	28	3
2017	East Tennessee State	11	182	322	56.5	2,213	6.9	78	14	6	124.9	83	6	0.1	18	1
2018	East Tennessee State	11	156	264	59.1	1,825	6.9	54	6	8	118.6	74	174	2.4	42	4
Totals		44	615	1,048	58.7	6,994	6.6	78	33	27	119.8	342	441	1.4	42	13

== Professional career ==
Pre-draft measurables
Height	Weight	40-yard dash
6 ft 2 in (1.88 m)	205 lb (93 kg)	4.94 s
All values are from Pro Day

After completing his collegiate career, Herink began to prepare for the possibility of playing in the NFL. However, he went undrafted and unsigned. He then signed with the Vienna Vikings for the spring 2019 season. Herink was the quarterback and assistant passing game coordinator for the Vienna Vikings, a pro football club in Vienna, Austria. He led the team to a second-place finish in both the Austrian Football League and the European Football League. Statistically, Herink finished the Austrian Football League season ranked second in passing yards, fourth in touchdown passes, and fourth in passer rating.

== Coaching career ==
Herink was named an Offensive Quality Control Coach at his alma mater, East Tennessee State, in 2019. With the Buccaneers, he assisted Head Coach Randy Sanders and the offensive coaching staff with game planning, while also instructing quarterbacks on proper mechanics, game planning and scheme knowledge. Herink also helped coordinate unofficial and official recruiting visits. In 2021, Herink was Associate Director of Football Operations. Herink assists with all facets of the day-to-day operations of the football program, including serving as a liaison with other units within the athletic department, assisting with budgets, team travel, and summer camps and clinics.
