= Horace Lockett =

American football player (born 2004)

No. 0 – UCF Knights
- Position: Defensive tackle
- Class: Redshirt Senior

Personal information
- Born: July 26, 2004 (age 22)
- Listed height: 6 ft 6 in (1.98 m)
- Listed weight: 362 lb (164 kg)

Career information
- High school: Westlake (Atlanta, Georgia)
- College: Georgia Tech (2022–2024); UCF (2025–present)
- Stats at ESPN

Horace Lockett (born July 26, 2004) is an American college football defensive tackle for the UCF Knights. He previously played for the Georgia Tech Yellow Jackets.

== Early life ==
Lockett is from Atlanta, Georgia. He is the youngest of eight children and has seven sisters. He attended Westlake High School in Atlanta where he played four years of football as a two-way lineman, winning all-region honors at both offensive and defensive lineman in his career. He was part of a team that compiled a record of 21–5 across the 2020 and 2021 seasons, reaching the third round of the state playoffs in the latter year. A four-star recruit, Lockett committed to play college football for the Georgia Tech Yellow Jackets.

== College career ==
As a true freshman at Georgia Tech in 2022, Lockett made three appearances. He saw more playing time in the 2023 season and tallied 25 tackles along with 2.5 tackles-for-loss (TFLs) and a forced fumble. However, a hand injury resulted in Lockett being kept out of every game during the 2024 season. The following year, he transferred to the UCF Knights. With UCF, Lockett won a starting role and posted 13 tackles, three TFLs, a sack and two pass breakups. However, a pectoral injury ended his season after four games. Lockett returned for a final season with the Knights in 2026.
