= List of cricket grounds in India =

Locations of active international stadiums in India

This is a list of cricket grounds in India that have been used for first-class, List A and Twenty20 cricket games. India has 49 international cricket venues, the most in any country - 26 more than the next most: England with 23.

Grounds listed in bold have hosted at least one international cricket match.
For grounds listed in italics, the name and exact location used for is unknown.
For grounds that share the same name, the city the ground is in is listed in brackets to avoid confusion.

== Andhra Pradesh ==
Name	City	State	First used	Last used	F/C	LA	T20	Notes
Neelam Sanjiva Reddy Stadium	Anantapur	Andhra Pradesh	1964	2008	6	0	0	
Police Parade Ground (Anantapur)	Anantapur	Andhra Pradesh	1962	2008	2	0	0	
Rural Development Trust Fund Stadium	Anantapur	Andhra Pradesh	2004		15	0	0	
Rural Development Trust Fund Stadium Second Ground	Anantapur	Andhra Pradesh	2007		0	0	0	
Dantuluri Narayana Raju College Ground	Bhimavaram	Andhra Pradesh	1993	1993	1	0	0	
Andhra Cricket Association Academy	Chintalavalasa	Andhra Pradesh	2013	2013	0	0	0	
Kandula Sreenivasa Reddy Memorial College of Engineering Ground	Cuddapah	Andhra Pradesh	2013	2013	0	0	0	
Municipal Stadium	Cuddapah	Andhra Pradesh	1985	1998	3	0	0	
YS Raja Reddy Stadium	Cuddapah	Andhra Pradesh	2011	4	3	0	0	
Alluri Seetharamaraju Stadium	Eluru	Andhra Pradesh	1995	1995	1	1	0	
Exhibition Ground	Eluru	Andhra Pradesh	1976	1976	1	0	0	
Sir C. Ramalinga Reddy College Ground	Eluru	Andhra Pradesh	1965	1965	1	0	0	
ACA Women's Cricket Academy Ground	Guntur	Andhra Pradesh	2011		0	0	0	Home of Indian women's cricket
Brahmananda Reddy Stadium	Guntur	Andhra Pradesh	1967	1983	9	0	0	
Police Parade Ground	Guntur	Andhra Pradesh	1962	1988	7	0	0	
Prakasam Stadium	Guntur	Andhra Pradesh	1958	1958	2	0	0	
Public Works Department Ground	Guntur	Andhra Pradesh	1957	1958	3	0	0	
Zilla Parishad Ground	Guntur	Andhra Pradesh	1960	1960	2	0	0	
District Sports Authority Stadium	Kakinada	Andhra Pradesh	1996	1999	2	2	0	
Pithupuram Raja Government College Ground	Kakinada	Andhra Pradesh	1978	1988	2	0	0	
Kurnool Sports Council Stadium	Kurnool	Andhra Pradesh	1988	2001	3	0	0	
Osmania College Ground	Kurnool	Andhra Pradesh	1972	1972	1	0	0	
Andhra Jateva Kalashala Ground	Machilipatnam	Andhra Pradesh	1984	1984	1	0	0	
Kodi Ramamurthy Stadium	Srikakulam	Andhra Pradesh	1986	1990	2	0	0	
Dr. YSP Grounds	Thummalagunta	Andhra Pradesh	2011	2011	0	0	0	
Agricultural College Ground	Tirupati	Andhra Pradesh	1988	1988	0	0	0	
Sri Venkateswara University Ground	Tirupati	Andhra Pradesh	1984	1992	0	0	0	
Veterinary College Ground	Tirupati	Andhra Pradesh	1988	1988	0	0	0	
Thrakarama Krida Pranganam	Venkatagiri	Andhra Pradesh	2011	2011	0	0	0	
Venkatagiri Samasthana Ground	Venkatagiri	Andhra Pradesh	1959	1982	2	0	0	
**Indira Gandhi Stadium (Vijayawada)**	Vijayawada	Andhra Pradesh	1969	2009	25	10	0	Hosted an ODI in 2002
Loyola College Ground	Vijayawada	Andhra Pradesh	1968	1968	1	0	0	
Police Parade Ground (Vijayawada)	Vijayawada	Andhra Pradesh	1966	1967	2	0	0	
**Dr. Y.S. Rajasekhara Reddy ACA-VDCA Cricket Stadium**	Visakhapatnam	Andhra Pradesh	2003	2015	12	32	39	Hosted three ODIs and a T20I.
Andhra University Ground	Visakhapatnam	Andhra Pradesh	1970	1977	3	0	0	
Hindustan Zinc Limited Ground	Visakhapatnam	Andhra Pradesh	2007	2009	0	0	10	
**Indira Priyadarshini Stadium**	Visakhapatnam	Andhra Pradesh	1987	2003	11	18	0	Hosted five ODIs.
Port Trust Diamond Jubilee Stadium	Visakhapatnam	Andhra Pradesh	1993	2009	1	8	0	
South Eastern Railway Ground	Visakhapatnam	Andhra Pradesh	1964	2002	8	6	0	
Trishna Stadium	Visakhapatnam	Andhra Pradesh	1996	2002	1	6	0	
Ukku Stadium	Visakhapatnam	Andhra Pradesh	1991	2009	8	8	0	
Dr PVG Raju Andhra Cricket Association Sports Complex Ground	Vizianagram	Andhra Pradesh	2011		2	0	5	Hosted 2 Women's T20I
Raja College Ground	Vizianagram	Andhra Pradesh	1982	1985	2	0	0	
Vizzy Stadium	Vizianagram	Andhra Pradesh	1995	1998	3	3	0	
Andhra University Ground	Waltair	Andhra Pradesh	1964	1978	0	0	0	

== Assam ==
Name	City	State	First used	Last used	F/C	LA	T20	Notes
Sarbananda Sonowal Sports Complex	Dibrugarh	Assam	1978		8	0	0	
**Dr. Bhupen Hazarika Cricket Stadium**	Guwahati	Assam	2013		1		1	hosted 1 T20I and 1 ODI.
Gauhati Town Club Ground	Guwahati	Assam	1956	1961	4	0	0	
**Nehru Stadium**	Guwahati	Assam	1964	2010	41	26	10	Hosted 16 ODIs.
North-East Frontier Railway Stadium	Guwahati	Assam	1976	2009	33	19	0	
District Sports Association Ground	Hailakandi	Assam	1995	2018	2	1	0	
Cinnamara Ground	Jorhat	Assam	1949	1949	1	0	0	
Jorhat Stadium	Jorhat	Assam	1953	1974	10	0	0	
Government High School Ground	Karimganj	Assam	1993	1993	1	1	0	
Darrang Sports Association Ground	Mangaldoi	Assam	1999	1999	1	1	0	
Nurul Amin Stadium	Nagaon	Assam	1959	1986	8	0	0	
Jubilee Field Ground	Nagaon	Assam	1951	1951	1	0	0	
Satindra Mohan Dev Stadium	Silchar	Assam	1987	2007	3	0	0	hosted 1 women international odi in 2005
Tinsukia District Sports Association Ground	Tinsukia	Assam	1992	2001	3	0	0	

== Bihar ==
Name	City	State	First used	Last used	F/C	LA	T20	Notes
Nehru Smarak Stadium	Bhagalpur	Bihar	1972	1973	2	0	0	
Sandy's Compound Enclosure	Bhagalpur	Bihar	1981	1981	1	0	0	
Dr. Nagendra Jha Stadium	Darbhanga	Bihar	1986	1998	2	0	0	
Engineering College Ground	Patna	Bihar	1965	1982	0	0	0	
Gandhi Maidan	Patna	Bihar	1958	1959	2	0	0	
**Moin-ul-Haq Stadium**	Patna	Bihar	1970	1998	15	8	0	Hosted three ODIs, all of which featured Zimbabwe.
Patna College Ground	Patna	Bihar	1982	1982	0	0	0	
Science College Ground	Patna	Bihar	1965	1982	0	0	0	

== Chandigarh ==
Name	City	State	First used	Last used	F/C	LA	T20	Notes
**Sector 16 Stadium**	Chandigarh	Chandigarh	1965	2011	33	22	0	Hosted one Test and five ODIs.

== Chhattisgarh ==
Name	City	State	First used	Last used	F/C	LA	T20	Notes
Bhilai Steel Plant Cricket Club Ground	Bhilai	Chhattisgarh	1965	1995	8	2	0	
Jayanti Stadium	Bhilai	Chhattisgarh	1984	1999	8	3	0	
Raja Raghuraj Singh Stadium	Bilaspur	Chhattisgarh	1978	1981	3	0	0	
Pandit Ravishankar Shukla Stadium	Durg	Chhattisgarh	1979	1999	2	1	0	
Rajkumar College Ground	Raipur	Chhattisgarh	1980	1986	2	0	0	
Shaheed Veer Narayan Singh International Cricket Stadium	Naya Raipur	Chhattisgarh	2010	2013	0	1	2	Hosted IPL matches.
Digvijay Stadium	Rajnandgaon	Chhattisgarh	1988	1999	4	1	0	

== Delhi ==
Name	City	State	First used	Last used	F/C	LA	T20	Notes
Army Headquarters	Delhi	Delhi	1961	1988	25	0	0	
Delhi Technological University Ground	Delhi	Delhi	2000	2013	10	6	0	
**Arun Jaitley Stadium**	Delhi	Delhi	1932	2011	260	82	39	Hosted 30 Tests and 21 ODIs.
Harbax Singh Stadium	Delhi	Delhi	1998	2010	10	25	5	
Irwin Stadium	Delhi	Delhi	1949	1949	1	0	0	
Jamia Millia Islamia University Ground	Delhi	Delhi	2000	2005	6	6	0	
Karnail Singh Stadium	Delhi	Delhi	1958	2010	131	21	0	
Palam 'A' Ground	Delhi	Delhi	1958	2010	100	38	30	
Palam 'B' Ground	Delhi	Delhi	2004	2010	0	5	10	
Polo Ground	Delhi	Delhi	1903	1903	1	0	0	
Roshanara Club Ground	Delhi	Delhi	1927	2010	18	0	0	
**Jawaharlal Nehru Stadium (New Delhi)**	New Delhi	Delhi	1984	1991	0	2	0	Hosted two ODIs, the only matches played at the stadium.

== Goa ==
Name	City	State	First used	Last used	F/C	LA	T20	Notes
Arlem Breweries Ground	Margao	Goa	1986	2005	12	9	0	
Dr. Rajendra Prasad Stadium	Margao	Goa	1968	2009	21	9	0	
**Nehru Stadium (Margao)**	Margao	Goa	1989	2010	1	9	0	Hosted nine ODIs.
Bhausaheb Bandodkar Ground	Panaji	Goa	1986	2006	26	16	0	
District Institute of Education and Training Ground	Porvorim	Goa	2010	2010	2	0	0	
Railway Stadium (Vasco da Gama)	Vasco da Gama	Goa	1985	1985	1	0	0	

== Gujarat ==
Name	City	State	First used	Last used	F/C	LA	T20	Notes
Commerce College Ground	Ahmedabad	Gujarat	1948	1959	17	0	0	
Gujarat College Ground	Ahmedabad	Gujarat	1935	1959	9	0	0	
Police Stadium (Ahmedabad)	Ahmedabad	Gujarat	1951	1951	1	0	0	
**Sardar Patel Stadium**	Ahmedabad	Gujarat	1983	2011	46	60	14	Hosted 11 Tests and 22 ODIs.
Sardar Patel Stadium 'B' Ground	Ahmedabad	Gujarat	2010	2010	0	6	0	
Sardar Patel Stadium 'C' Ground	Ahmedabad	Gujarat	2010	2010	0	5	0	
**Sardar Vallabhbhai Patel Stadium (Ahmedabad)**	Ahmedabad	Gujarat	1960	2009	25	9	0	Hosted an ODI in 1981.
Lal Bahadur Shastri Stadium	Anand	Gujarat	1962	1994	11	2	0	
Ulhas Gymkhana	Atul	Gujarat	1960	1961	2	0	0	
Gujarat Narmada Fertilizers Company Ground	Bharuch	Gujarat	1987	1989	2	0	0	
Jayendra Puri Arts College Ground	Bharuch	Gujarat	1986	1986	1	0	0	
Western Railway Stadium	Bhavnagar	Gujarat	1962	1981	4	0	0	
Jubilee Maidan Ground	Bhuj	Gujarat	1973	1980	3	0	0	
Saru Club Ground	Dhrangadhra	Gujarat	1961	1961	1	0	0	
Dhrol	Dhrol	Gujarat	1948	1948	2	0	0	
Indian Farmers' Fertilisers Co-Operative Udyognagar Stadium	Gandhidham	Gujarat	1985	2000	3	0	0	
Gandhinagar Gymkhana	Gandhinagar	Gujarat	1987	1989	2	0	0	
State Reserve Police Camp	Gondal	Gujarat	1980	1980	1	0	0	
Ajitsinhji Ground	Jamnagar	Gujarat	1937	2005	27	2	0	
Cricket Bungalow Ground	Jamnagar	Gujarat	2004	2004	0	1	0	
Jafar Maidan	Junagadh	Gujarat	1942	1973	4	0	0	
Malinagar High School Ground	Maninagar	Gujarat	1976	1976	1	0	0	
Digvijaysinhi Pavilion Ground	Morvi	Gujarat	1964	1964	1	0	0	
Jethabhai Jhaverbhai College of Science Ground	Nadiad	Gujarat	1970	1970	1	0	0	
Municipal Stadium (Nadiad)	Nadiad	Gujarat	1972	1981	6	0	0	
Gali Vada Cricket Ground	Navsari	Gujarat	1986	1986	1	0	0	
European Gymkhana Ground	Rajkot	Gujarat	1938	1960	7	0	0	
Khandheri Cricket Stadium	Rajkot	Gujarat	2008		9	7	2	Hosted 2 Tests, 2 ODIs and 2 T20Is.
**Madhavrao Scindia Cricket Ground**	Rajkot	Gujarat	1935	2010	97	44	0	Hosted 12 ODIs.
Rajkot Cricket Club Ground	Rajkot	Gujarat	1944	1944	1	0	0	
Rajkumar College Ground	Rajkot	Gujarat	1933	1963	4	0	0	
Western Railway Ground	Rajkot	Gujarat	1961	2004	3	5	0	
Baroda Rayon Corporation Ground	Surat	Gujarat	1990	1992	2	1	0	
CB Patel International Cricket Stadium	Surat	Gujarat	-	-	-	-	-	
Lalabhai Contractor Stadium	Surat	Gujarat	1993	2010	12	3	0	
Maganbhai Thakordas Balmukundas College Ground	Surat	Gujarat	1990	1992	6	0	0	
Pithwala Stadium	Surat	Gujarat	1989	1992	2	0	0	
Police Parade Ground (Athwalines)	Surat	Gujarat	1960	1972	8	0	0	
Rander Islam Gymkhana Ground	Surat	Gujarat	1980	1980	1	0	0	
South Gujarat Cricket Association Ground	Surat	Gujarat	1967	1972	2	0	0	
Jawahar Maidan Ground	Surendranagar	Gujarat	1972	1982	3	0	0	
College Ground (Valsad)	Valsad	Gujarat	1973	1977	5	0	0	
Morajee Naga Ground	Valsad	Gujarat	1971	1971	1	0	0	
Sardar Vallabhbhai Patel Stadium (Valsad)	Valsad	Gujarat	1980	2010	22	7	0	
Alembic Ground	Vadodara	Gujarat	2000	2011	1	8	0	
Central College Ground (Vadodara)	Vadodara	Gujarat	1938	1947	13	0	0	
Gujarat State Fertilizer Corporation Ground	Vadodara	Gujarat	1988	2006	14	8	0	
**IPCL Sports Complex Ground**	Vadodara	Gujarat	1992	2011	33	34	4	Hosted ten ODIs.
Laxmi Vilas Palace Ground	Vadodara	Gujarat	1958	1958	1	0	0	
Maharaja Pratapsingh Coronation Gymkhana Ground	Vadodara	Gujarat	1944	2007	13	1	0	
**Moti Bagh Stadium**	Vadodara	Gujarat	1958	2011	115	25	6	Hosted three ODIs.
F. B. Colony Ground	Vadodara	Gujarat	2021					

== Haryana ==
Name	City	State	First used	Last used	F/C	LA	T20	Notes
Police Stadium (Bhiwani)	Bhiwani	Haryana	1979	1979	1	0	0	
Technological Institute of Textiles Senior Secondary School Ground	Bhiwani	Haryana	1989	1994	4	2	0	
Country Golf Club Ground	Faridabad	Haryana	1981	1981	1	0	0	
**Nahar Singh Stadium**	Faridabad	Haryana	1983	2006	35	27	0	Hosted eight ODIs.
Nehru Stadium	Gurgaon	Haryana	1987	2002	15	16	0	
Tata Energy Research Institute Oval	Gurgaon	Haryana	2000	2010	4	5	0	
Tau Devi Lal Stadium	Gurgaon	Haryana	2004	2005	4	0	0	
Haryana Agricultural University Stadium	Hissar	Haryana	1975	1975	1	0	0	
Government College Ground (Karoli)	Karoli	Haryana	1987	1987	1	0	0	
University Ground (Kurukshetra)	Kurukshetra	Haryana	1972	1973	3	0	0	
Chaudhary Bansi Lal Cricket Stadium	Rohtak	Haryana	2006	2010	17	5	0	
Maharaja Aggarsain Stadium	Rohtak	Haryana	1980	2003	7	6	0	
Vishkarma High School Ground	Rohtak	Haryana	1975	2003	21	3	0	
Shah Satnam Ji Stadium	Sirsa	Haryana	2005	2010	2	5	0	
Moti Lal School of Sports Ground	Sonipat	Haryana	1976	1977	3	0	0	
Guru Jambheshwer University Of Science And Technology Cricket Ground	Hissar	Haryana	1995	2011	3	0	0	

== Himachal Pradesh ==
Name	City	State	First used	Last used	F/C	LA	T20	Notes
Lohnu Cricket Ground	Bilaspur	Himachal Pradesh	2001	2002	2	0	0	
Police Stadium	Chamba	Himachal Pradesh	1995	1999	3	3	0	
**Himachal Pradesh Cricket Association Stadium**	Dharamsala	Himachal Pradesh	2003	2013	27	12	3	Hosted one ODI
Kangda Police Stadium	Dharmasala	Himachal Pradesh	1990	1991	2	0	0	
Shaheed Krishan Chand Memorial Stadium	Mandi	Himachal Pradesh	1986	2002	11	7	0	
Atal Bihari Vajpayee Stadium	Nadaun	Himachal Pradesh	2005	2005	0	5	0	
Maharaja Lakshman Sen Memorial College Ground	Sunder Nagar	Himachal Pradesh	1997	1997	1	1	0	
Indira Gandhi Stadium	Una	Himachal Pradesh	1986	2011	24	24	0	
Jawaharlal Navoday Vidhyalay Stadium	Una	Himachal Pradesh	1999	1999	1	0	0	

== Jammu & Kashmir ==
Name	City	State	First used	Last used	F/C	LA	T20	Notes
Gandhi Memorial Science College Ground	Jammu	Jammu and Kashmir	1976		18	0	0	
**Maulana Azad Stadium**	Jammu	Jammu and Kashmir	1966	2005	32	5	0	Hosted an ODI in 1988.
University Ground	Jammu	Jammu and Kashmir	1989	1989	0	0	0	
Vikram Park Ground	Jammu	Jammu and Kashmir	1989	1989	0	0	0	
Sports Stadium	Kathua	Jammu and Kashmir	2000	2000	0	0	0	
Amar Singh Club Ground	Srinagar	Jammu and Kashmir	1960	1982	39	1	0	
Amarsingh College Ground	Srinagar	Jammu and Kashmir	1961	1961	0	0	0	
Delhi Public School Ground	Srinagar	Jammu and Kashmir	2011	2013	0	0	0	
Kashmir University Ground	Srinagar	Jammu and Kashmir	2007	2011	0	0	0	
SP College Ground	Srinagar	Jammu and Kashmir	1961	1961	0	0	0	
**Sher-i-Kashmir Stadium**	Srinagar	Jammu and Kashmir	1983	2009	21	3	0	Hosted two ODIs.
Chinar Stadium	Udhampur	Jammu and Kashmir	1978	2008	6	0	0	

== Jharkhand ==
Name	City	State	First used	Last used	F/C	LA	T20	Notes
Jawaharlal Nehru Stadium	Dhanbad	Jharkhand	2006	2009	0	5	3	
Railway Stadium	Dhanbad	Jharkhand	2009	2009	2	0	4	
Nehru Stadium	Giridih	Jharkhand	1989	1989	1	0	0	
Hazaribagh Stadium	Hazaribagh	Jharkhand	1988	1988	2	0	0	
Tata Digwadih Stadium	Jamadoba	Jharkhand	1969	2009	13	6	3	
**Keenan Stadium**	Jamshedpur	Jharkhand	1939		103	33	0	Hosted ten ODIs.
JRD Tata Sports Complex	Jamshedpur	Jharkhand	1970					
ISWP Sports Complex	Jamshedpur	Jharkhand						
Sumant Moolgaokar Stadium	Jamshedpur	Jharkhand	1980		0	0	0	
Telco Club Ground	Jamshedpur	Jharkhand	2004	2004	0	5	0	
Shahid Nirmal Mahato Stadium	Jamshedpur	Jharkhand	1985		0	0	0	
Birsa Stadium	Ranchi	Jharkhand	1993	1999	2	2	0	
**JSCA International Stadium Complex**	Ranchi	Jharkhand	2010		1	0	0	Hosted 1 Test, 4 ODIs and 1 T20I.
Metallurgical & Engineering Consultant Ltd Sail Stadium	Ranchi	Jharkhand	1984	2009	19	1	0	

== Karnataka ==
Name	City	State	First used	Last used	F/C	LA	T20	Notes
Central College Ground	Bangalore	Karnataka	1941	2002	53	2	0	
Gymkhana Ground	Bangalore	Karnataka	1935	1952	8	0	0	
Indian Air Force Ground	Bangalore	Karnataka	2003	2004	2	1	0	
KSCA Cricket Ground	Alur	Karnataka	2014	2019	5	40	0	
Alur Cricket Ground	Alur	Karnataka	2014	2019	5	40	0	
Three Ovals KSCA Stadium	Alur	Karnataka	2014	2019	5	40	0	
**M. Chinnaswamy Stadium**	Bangalore	Karnataka	1972	2011	130	71	32	Hosted 19 Tests and 23 ODIs.
Maharaja Jayachamaraja Wodayar Sports Centre	Bangalore	Karnataka	2002	2002	5	0	0	
Rail Wheel Factory Ground	Bangalore	Karnataka	2002	2002	0	3	0	
Rajinder Singh Institute Ground	Bangalore	Karnataka	1996	2009	9	1	0	
St. Joseph's New Field	Bangalore	Karnataka	1965	1967	3	0	0	
KSCA Stadium	Belagavi	Karnataka	2016	2018	3	0	0	
Union Gymkhana Ground	Belgaum	Karnataka	1970	2000	2	0	0	
District Stadium	Bellary	Karnataka	1985	1985	1	0	0	
Vishvesharayya Iron and Steel Limited Ground	Bhadravati	Karnataka	1985	1996	3	1	0	
Nehru Stadium	Bidar	Karnataka	1988	1988	1	0	0	
Dr. Ambedkar Stadium	Bijapur	Karnataka	1969	1995	4	1	0	
District Field	Chickmagalur	Karnataka	1977	1977	1	0	0	
Davanagere Cotton Mills Sports Stadium	Davanagere	Karnataka	1981	1990	2	0	0	
Government High School Ground	Dharwad	Karnataka	1959	1959	1	0	0	
RN Shetty Stadium	Dharwad	Karnataka	1990	1990	1	0	0	
Town Planning Authority Ground	Dharwad	Karnataka	1985	1985	1	0	0	
Chandrasekhar Patil Stadium	Gulbarga	Karnataka	1984	1987	2	0	0	
District Youth Service Stadium	Hassan	Karnataka	1985	1989	2	0	0	
Nehru Stadium	Hubli	Karnataka	1972	1992	3	0	0	
Bharat Earth Movers Limited Sports Complex	Kolar Gold Fields	Karnataka	1991	1991	1	0	0	
People's Education Trust Cricket Stadium	Mandya	Karnataka	2003	2003	1	0	0	
Central Maidan	Mangalore	Karnataka	1957	1959	2	0	0	
Chamundi Vihar Stadium	Mysore	Karnataka	1988	1988	1	0	0	
Gangothri Glades Cricket Ground	Mysore	Karnataka	2006	2010	7	0	0	
Infosys Ground	Mysore	Karnataka	2005	2007	2	0	0	Hosted two WOMEN'S ODIs International Matches.
Maharaja's College Ground	Mysore	Karnataka	1958	1972	3	0	0	
Raichur Stadium	Raichur	Karnataka	1975	1987	2	0	0	
Nehru Stadium	Shimoga	Karnataka	1974	1979	2	0	0	
Jawaharlal Nehru National College Of Engineering Ground	Shimoga	Karnataka	2011	2011	1	0	0	
District Level Stadium	Sirsi	Karnataka	1990	1990	1	0	0	
Nehru Stadium	Tumkur	Karnataka	1973	1973	1	0	0	
Mahatma Gandhi Memorial College Ground	Udupi	Karnataka	1978	1978	1	0	0	
Virgin Holidays Ground	Bangalore	Karnataka	1999	2017	8	6	0	Hosted few WOMEN'S ODI's International Matches.

== Kerala ==
Name	City	State	First used	Last used	F/C	LA	T20	Notes
**Trivandrum International Stadium**	Trivandrum	Kerala	2015	2018	1	0	1	Hosted Kerala's first T20I and One ODI
Maharaja College Stadium	Ernakulam	Kerala	1954	1988	4	0	0	
Military Maidan	Kannur	Kerala	1961	1961	1	0	0	
Police Parade Ground	Kannur	Kerala	1971	1980	4	0	0	
Cochin Refineries Ltd. Ground	Kochi	Kerala	1992	1992	1	0	0	
Fort Cochin Parade Maidan	Kochi	Kerala	1962	1984	5	0	0	
**Nehru Stadium**	Kochi	Kerala	1996	2011	14	11	4	Hosted 8 ODIs.
Premier Tyres Oval	Kochi	Kerala	1973	1973	2	0	0	
Asramam Maidan	Kollam	Kerala	2011	2014	0	109	0	
Lal Bahadur Shastri Stadium, Kollam	Kollam	Kerala	1979	1988	3	0	0	
Sree Narayana College Ground	Kollam	Kerala	1977	1977	1	0	0	
Nehru Stadium	Kottayam	Kerala	1972	1993	5	2	0	
EMS Stadium	Kozhikode	Kerala	1976	1994	3	1	0	
Manachira Maidan	Kozhikode	Kerala	1963	1968	3	0	0	
Calicut Medical College Stadium	Kozhikode	Kerala	1991	1991	1	0	0	
Regional Engineering College Ground	Kozhikode	Kerala	1992	2000	4	3	0	
Malabar State Police Ground	Malappuram	Kerala	1990	1990	1	0	0	
Fort Maidan	Palakkad	Kerala	2003	2011	15	7	0	
Victoria College Ground	Palakkad	Kerala	1958	1996	8	3	0	
Perintalmanna Cricket Stadium	Perintalmanna	Kerala	2010	2011	2	8	0	
Conor Vyal Stadium	Thalassery	Kerala	2009	2009	1	0	0	
Thalassery Stadium	Thalassery	Kerala	1957	1999	16	4	0	
Prithi Stadium	Thiruvalla	Kerala	1990	1992	2	0	0	
Fertilizers and Chemicals Travancore	Eloor	Kerala	1966	1966	2	0	0	Hosted one T20
Medical College Ground	Trivandrum	Kerala	1986	1987	3	0	0	
**University Stadium**	Trivandrum	Kerala	1952	1988	24	3	0	Hosted two ODIs.
St Xavier's College Ground	Trivandrum	Kerala	2015	2017	2	3	0	
Central Stadium (Thiruvananthapuram)	Trivandrum	Kerala	1932	2017	2	3	0	
Chandrasekharan Nair Stadium	Trivandrum	Kerala	1956	2018	19	33	0	
Vellyani Agricultural College Ground	Trivandrum	Kerala	1990	1998	4	3	0	
Thrissur Municipal Corporation Stadium	Thrissur	Kerala	1978	1978	1	0	0	
Wayanad International Stadium	Wayanad	Kerala	2015	2015	2	0	0	

== Madhya Pradesh ==
There are three international venues in Madhya Pradesh. In November 2015, the Holkar Stadium was selected as one of the six new Test venues in India.

Name	City	State	First used	Last used	F/C	LA	T20	Notes
**Captain Roop Singh Stadium**	Gwalior	Madhya Pradesh	1979	2015	25	18	0	Hosted 12 ODIs.
**Holkar Stadium**	Indore	Madhya Pradesh	1997	2015	52	53	38	Hosted 4 ODIs.
**Nehru Stadium**	Indore	Madhya Pradesh	1965	2001	41	17	0	Hosted nine ODIs.

== Maharashtra ==
Name	City	State	First used	Last used	F/C	LA	T20	Notes
Wadia Park Ground	Ahmednagar	Maharashtra	1957	1979	6	0	0	
Akola Cricket Club Ground	Akola	Maharashtra	1983	1984	2	0	0	
Hanuman Vyayam Prasarak Mandal Ground	Amravati	Maharashtra	1980	1980	1	0	0	
Territorial Army Parade Ground	Amravati	Maharashtra	1976	1976	1	0	0	
Cantonment Military Parade Ground	Aurangabad	Maharashtra	1961	1962	2	0	0	
Marathwada Sanskrit Mandal Ground	Aurangabad	Maharashtra	1977	1977	1	0	0	
Marathwada University Ground	Aurangabad	Maharashtra	1989	1989	1	0	0	
Aurangabad District Cricket Association Stadium	Aurangabad	Maharashtra	1998	2005	4	0	0	
Shivaji Maidan	Aurangabad	Maharashtra	1966	1966	1	0	0	
Central Railway Ground	Bhusawal	Maharashtra	1993	1993	2	0	0	
Teka Naka Ground	Hinganghat	Maharashtra	1982	1982	1	0	0	
Rajaram Maidan	Ichalkaranji	Maharashtra	1980	2003	2	0	0	
Police Parade Ground (Jalgaon)	Jalgaon	Maharashtra	1960	1973	2	0	0	
Chatrapati Shivaji Stadium	Karad	Maharashtra	1978	2006	4	0	0	
Engineering College Ground (Karad)	Karad	Maharashtra	1965	1965	1	0	0	
National Defence Academy Ground	Khadakwasla, Pune	Maharashtra	1956	1958	4	0	0	
College of Military Engineering Ground	Khadki	Maharashtra	1957	1957	2	0	0	
Shri Chhatrapati Shivaji Stadium	Kolhapur	Maharashtra	1951	2006	14	1	0	
Bandra Kurla Complex Ground	Mumbai	Maharashtra	2008	2010	7	0	0	
**Brabourne Stadium**	Mumbai	Maharashtra	1937	2015	221	24	22	Hosted 18 Tests, eight ODIs and one Twenty20 International. Hosted the 2006 ICC Champions Trophy Final.
**DY Patil Stadium**	Navi Mumbai	Maharashtra	2008	2011	0	1	17	Hosted one ODI in 2009.
**Gymkhana Ground (Mumbai)**	Mumbai	Maharashtra	1892	2001	104	3	0	Hosted the first first-class match in India in 1892. Hosted one Test in 1933.
Marine Lines Ground	Mumbai	Maharashtra	1912	1912	2	0	0	
Middle Income Group Club Ground	Mumbai	Maharashtra	2000	2001	2	3	0	Hosted Four Women's ODI
Rashtriya Chemicals and Fertilisers Company Ground	Mumbai	Maharashtra	1986	1995	2	1	0	
**Wankhede Stadium**	Mumbai	Maharashtra	1974	2015	160	70	25	Hosted 21 Tests and 18 ODIs. Hosted the 2011 World Cup Final.
Willingdon Sports Club	Mumbai	Maharashtra	1918	1918	1	0	0	
IPCL Ground	Mumbai	Maharashtra	1986	1995	2	1	0	
Rashtriya Chemicals and Fertilisers Company Ground	Nagothana	Maharashtra	1998	2007	2	1	0	
Ambajhari Ordinance Factory Ground	Nagpur	Maharashtra	1980	1980	1	0	0	
**Vidarbha Cricket Association Ground**	Nagpur	Maharashtra	1933	2008	159	37	0	Hosted nine Tests and 14 ODIs. Replaced by the new VCA Stadium in 2008.
**Vidarbha Cricket Association Stadium**	Nagpur	Maharashtra	2008	2011	9	10	4	Hosted three Tests, six ODIs and a Twenty20 International.
Guru Govindsingh Ground	Nanded	Maharashtra	1980	1984	2	0	0	
Hutatma Anant Kanhere Maidan	Nashik	Maharashtra	2005	2010	8	0	0	
Police Parade Ground (Nashik)	Nashik	Maharashtra	1957	1982	5	0	0	
Deccan Gymkhana Ground	Pune	Maharashtra	1893	2009	41	14	5	
**Nehru Stadium (Pune)**	Pune	Maharashtra	1949	2009	96	38	10	Hosted 11 ODIs.
Poona Gymkhana Ground	Pune	Maharashtra	1892	1892	1	0	0	Hosted the second first-class match in India.
Poona Young Cricketers Hindu Gymkhana Ground	Pune	Maharashtra	2008	2008	0	5	0	
Pune Club Ground	Pune	Maharashtra	1935	2009	39	3	5	In 1948 BB Nimbalkar scored 443* for Maharashtra against Kathiawar at the ground, the highest first-class score in India and the fourth-highest overall, one of only ten quadruple centuries scored.
**Maharashtra Cricket Association Stadium**	Pune	Maharashtra	2012		0	5	0	hosted an ODIs & T20I
Rajendrasinhji Stadium	Pune	Maharashtra	1960	1960	1	0	0	
Chhatrapati Shivaji Stadium	Ratnagiri	Maharashtra	2006	2007	2	0	0	
Shahu Stadium	Satara	Maharashtra	1975	1979	2	0	0	
Zilla Parishad (Satara)	Satara	Maharashtra	1965	1967	2	0	0	
Indira Gandhi Stadium (Solapur)	Solapur	Maharashtra	1952	1994	10	5	0	
Central Maidan (Thane)	Thane	Maharashtra	1963	1963	1	0	0	
Dadaji Kondadev Stadium	Thane	Maharashtra	1982	1996	6	3	0	
MR College Stadium	Walchandnagar	Maharashtra	1967	1967	1	0	0	
Postal Ground	Yavatmal	Maharashtra	1985	1989	2	0	0	

== Manipur ==
Name	City	State	First used	Last used	F/C	LA	T20	Notes
Luwangpokpa Cricket Stadium	Imphal	Manipur	2008	0	0	0		

== Meghalaya ==
Name	City	State	First used	Last used	F/C	LA	T20	Notes
Garrison Ground	Shillong	Meghalaya	1949	1949	1	0	0	

== Nagaland ==
Name	City	State	First used	Last used	F/C	LA	T20	Notes
Nagaland Cricket Association Stadium	Chümoukedima	Nagaland	2012	2012	0	0	0	

== Odisha ==
Name	City	State	First used	Last used	F/C	LA	T20	Notes
Angul Stadium	Angul	Odisha	2000	2000	1	1	0	
Permit Ground	Balasore	Odisha	1985	2001	5	3	0	
Nehru Stadium	Bhadrak	Odisha	1964	2014	1	1	1	
Baripada Stadium	Baripada	Odisha	1973	2002	10	1	0	
Khalli Kote College Ground	Berhampur	Odisha	1967	1981	2	0	0	
Sports Stadium (Berhampur)	Berhampur	Odisha	1993	1998	3	2	0	
Lal Bahadur Shastri Stadium(Bhawanipatna)	Bhawanipatna	Odisha	2008	2010	4	0	0	
Infosys Ground (Bhubaneswar)	Bhubaneswar	Odisha	2007	2007	0	5	0	
KIIT Stadium	Bhubaneswar	Odisha	2018	2019	0	0	11	
**Barabati Stadium**	Cuttack	Odisha	1950	2011	82	55	2	Hosted two Tests and 16 ODIs.
Orissa School of Engineering Ground (Bhubananda)	Cuttack	Odisha	1991	1991	2	0	0	
Ravenshaw College Ground	Cuttack	Odisha	2009	2010	1	8	5	
Sunshine Ground	Cuttack	Odisha	2001	2010	0	5	5	
Gopabandhu Stadium	Paradeep	Odisha	2000	2004	1	1	0	
Samanta Chandrashekar College Ground	Puri	Odisha	2000	2000	1	1	0	
Ispat Stadium	Rourkela	Odisha	1969	1998	13	3	0	hosted matches up to 2008
Veer Surendra Sai Stadium	Sambalpur	Odisha	1973	2009	11	2	0	
Baxijagbandhu Stadium	Talcher	Odisha	1986	1986	1	0	0	

== Punjab ==
Name	City	State	First used	Last used	F/C	LA	T20	Notes
**Gandhi Sports Complex Ground**	Amritsar	Punjab	1933	2010	55	13	0	Hosted two ODIs.
Shaheed Bhagat Singh Stadium	Firozpur	Punjab	1961	1967	2	0	0	
**Gandhi Stadium**	Jalandhar	Punjab	1952	2002	33	16	0	Hosted one Test and three ODIs.
Gilbert Park	Jalandhar	Punjab	1963	1963	1	0	0	
Jullundur Club	Jalandhar	Punjab	1970	1972	4	0	0	
Municipal Ground (Jalandhar)	Jalandhar	Punjab	1960	1960	2	0	0	
Randir College	Kapurthala	Punjab	1963	1963	1	0	0	
Government College For Boys Ground	Ludhiana	Punjab	1991	1991	1	0	0	
Guru Nanak Stadium	Ludhiana	Punjab	1980	1980	1	0	0	
Municipal Gymkhana	Ludhiana	Punjab	1963	1967	4	0	0	
Punjab Agricultural University Stadium	Ludhiana	Punjab	1987	2007	11	10	0	
**Punjab Cricket Association Stadium**	Mohali	Punjab	1993	2011	64	52	17	Hosted 10 Tests, 19 ODIs and one T20 International.
Government College Ground (Muktsar)	Muktsar	Punjab	1974	1974	1	0	0	
Dhruve Pandove Stadium	Patiala	Punjab	1927	2014	67	14	0	
Diesel Component Works Sports Stadium	Patiala	Punjab	1999	1999	2	0	0	
National Institute of Sports Ground	Patiala	Punjab	1963	1965	2	0	0	

== Rajasthan ==
Name	City	State	First used	Last used	F/C	LA	T20	Notes
Mayo College Ground	Ajmer	Rajasthan	1926	1986	19	0	0	
Indira Gandhi Stadium	Alwar	Rajasthan	1993	1995	4	4	0	
Sanajan Dharma Government College Ground	Beawar	Rajasthan	1981	1981	1	0	0	
Municipal Ground (Bhilwara)	Bhilwara	Rajasthan	1980	1987	3	0	0	
Sukhadia Stadium	Bhilwara	Rajasthan	1995	1998	1	3	0	
Shivraj Stadium	Bhinmal	Rajasthan	1985	1985	1	0	0	
Northern Railway Stadium	Bikaner	Rajasthan	1976	1995	5	2	0	**Hosted 4 ranji matches**
Chaugan Stadium	Jaipur	Rajasthan	1953	1986	4	0	0	
KL Saini Ground	Jaipur	Rajasthan	1991	2009	37	19	0	
Maharaja College Ground (Jaipur)	Jaipur	Rajasthan	1961	1989	3	0	0	
Neerja Modi School Ground	Jaipur	Rajasthan	2004	2004	0	5	0	
Railway Cricket Ground	Jaipur	Rajasthan	1964	1989	9	0	0	
**Sawai Mansingh Stadium**	Jaipur	Rajasthan	1969	2011	35	35	37	Hosted one Test and 18 ODIs.
Sports Complex	Jhalawar	Rajasthan	2005	2007	3	0	0	
**Barkatullah Khan Stadium**	Jodhpur	Rajasthan	1985	2002	5	3	0	Hosted two ODIs.
Northern Railway Cricket Ground	Jodhpur	Rajasthan	1970	1972	2	0	0	
Khetri Copper Complex Stadium	Khetri Nagar	Rajasthan	1981	1981	1	0	0	
International Cricket Stadium	Kota	Rajasthan	1974	2010	6	1	0	
Umed Club Ground	Kota	Rajasthan	1976	1976	1	0	0	
Bhupal Noble's College Ground	Udaipur	Rajasthan	1957	1963	15	0	0	
Field Club Ground	Udaipur	Rajasthan	2001	2010	3	5	0	
Maharana Bhupal College Ground	Udaipur	Rajasthan	1968	2006	11	11	0	
Maharana Bhupal Stadium	Udaipur	Rajasthan	1982	1983	2	0	0	
Railway Institute Ground	Udaipur	Rajasthan	1956	1956	1	0	0	

== Sikkim ==
Name	City	State	First used	Last used	F/C	LA	T20	Notes
Jorethang Cricket Club Ground	Jorethang	Sikkim	2004	2004	0	0	0	
Mining Ground	Rangpo	Sikkim	1997	2008	0	0	0	

== Tamil Nadu ==
Name	City	State	First used	Last used	F/C	LA	T20	Notes
Central Polytechnic India Pistons Ground	Chennai	Tamil Nadu	2000	2010	0	15	0	
Chemplast Cricket Ground, IIT Madras	Chennai	Tamil Nadu	2000	2010	5	8	0	
Guru Nanak College Ground	Chennai	Tamil Nadu	1996	2010	10	19	0	
**MA Chidambaram Stadium**	Chennai	Tamil Nadu	1915	2011	248	82	30	one of the major international grounds hosting the Indian cricket team
Marina Stadium	Chennai	Tamil Nadu	1940	1940	1	1	0	
**Nehru Stadium**	Chennai	Tamil Nadu	1953	1965	35	0	0	Hosted nine Tests
TI Cycles Ground	Chennai	Tamil Nadu	2008					
MRF Pachyappas Ground	Chennai	Tamil Nadu	2008	2010	0	6	0	
Sri Sivasubramaniya Nadar College of Engineering Ground	Chennai	Tamil Nadu	2008	2010	0	6	0	
Southern Railway Ground	Chennai	Tamil Nadu	1993	2000	1	1	0	
SPIC YMCA Ground	Chennai	Tamil Nadu	2000	2000	0	2	0	
Sri Ramachandra Medical College Ground	Chennai	Tamil Nadu	2003	2008	0	7	0	
Vivekananda College Ground	Chennai	Tamil Nadu	2004	2004	0	2	0	
Forest College Ground	Coimbatore	Tamil Nadu	1978	1992	3	1	0	
PSG Institute Ground	Coimbatore	Tamil Nadu	1958	1959	2	0	0	
Nehru Stadium	Coimbatore	Tamil Nadu	1970	1990	3	0	0	
Tamil Nadu Agricultural University Ground	Coimbatore	Tamil Nadu	1965	1990	3	0	0	
VO Chidambaram Park Stadium	Erode	Tamil Nadu	1987	1987	1	0	0	
Race Course Ground	Madurai	Tamil Nadu	1957	1957	1	0	0	
NPR College Ground	Dindigul	Tamil Nadu		2019	10	0	0	
Pudokottah Ground	Pudukkottai	Tamil Nadu	1937	1937	1	0	0	
Little Flower School Ground	Salem	Tamil Nadu	1956	1987	5	0	0	
Mahatma Gandhi Stadium	Salem	Tamil Nadu	1973	1992	7	0	0	
Salem Cricket Foundation Stadium	Salem	Tamil Nadu	2020					
SRP Cricket Ground	Salem	Tamil Nadu	2017					
Nehru Stadium	Tiruchirappalli	Tamil Nadu	1968	1990	3	0	0	
Indian Cement Company Ground	Tirunelveli	Tamil Nadu	1969	2005	6	2	0	
Nehru Stadium	Vellore	Tamil Nadu	1940	2009	10	3	0	
VIT University Ground	Vellore	Tamil Nadu	1984	2010	5	3	0	
AERI College Ground	Hosur	Tamil Nadu	2005	2017	8	4	0	
NetGround	Tiruchirapalli	Tamil Nadu	2019	2020	0	0	0	

== Telangana ==
Name	City	State	First used	Last used	F/C	LA	T20	Notes
Electronic Corporation of India Ltd. Ground	Hyderabad	Telangana	2005	2006	1	0	0	
**Lal Bahadur Shastri Stadium (Hyderabad)**	Hyderabad	Telangana	1951	2003	136	30	0	Hosted three Tests and 14 ODIs.
**Rajiv Gandhi International Cricket Stadium**	Hyderabad	Telangana	2005	2015	25	21	41	Hosted one Test and three ODIs.
The League, Woxsen University	Hyderabad	Telangana	2022	2024	0	0	1	ICC Standard University Cricket Ground
Prakasham Stadium	Kothagudem	Telangana	1962	1989	7	0	0	
Singareni Colleries Ground	Kothagudem	Telangana	1973	1981	2	0	0	
Government Polytechnic Ground	Nizamabad	Telangana	1970	1981	4	0	0	
Army Ordnance Centre Cricket Ground	Secunderabad	Telangana	1992	1992	1	0	0	
Gymkhana Ground	Secunderabad	Telangana	1931	2010	111	33	6	Hosted women's ODI
Nuclear Fuel Complex Ground	Secunderabad	Telangana	1998	2006	5	6	0	
Railways Recreation Club Ground	Secunderabad	Telangana	1946	2007	8	5	0	
Sirpur Paper Mills Ground	Kagaznagar	Telangana	1966	1985	3	0	0	
Multi-Purpose High School Ground	Warangal	Telangana	1960	1960	1	0	0	
Regional Engineering College Ground (Warangal)	Warangal	Telangana	1976	1976	1	0	0	

== Tripura ==
Name	City	State	First used	Last used	F/C	LA	T20	Notes
Maharaja Bir Bikram College Stadium	Agartala	Tripura	1998	2011	27	23	0	
Polytechnic Institute Ground	Agartala	Tripura	1990	2011	15	24	0	

== Uttar Pradesh ==
Name	City	State	First used	Last used	F/C	LA	T20	Notes
Sadar Bazar Stadium	Agra	Uttar Pradesh	1934	1987	18	0	0	
Aligarh Muslim University Ground	Aligarh	Uttar Pradesh	1927	1975	2	0	0	
Madan Mohan Malviya Stadium	Allahabad	Uttar Pradesh	1893	1997	10	1	0	
Northern Railway Divisional Sports Association Stadium	Allahabad	Uttar Pradesh	1966	1966	2	0	0	
District Sports Association Ground (Bareilly)	Bareilly	Uttar Pradesh	1980	1980	1	0	0	
**Bharat Ratna Shri Atal Bihari Vajpayee Ekana Cricket Stadium**	Lucknow	Uttar Pradesh	2017	2018	0	0	1	Hosted one Test, 3 ODIs and 4 T20Is.
Jawaharlal Nehru Stadium	Ghaziabad	Uttar Pradesh	1992	2008	4	0	0	
Mohan Meakins Cricket Stadium	Ghaziabad	Uttar Pradesh	1971		4	0	0	Hosted 2 Women's ODI
Regional Sports Stadium	Gorakhpur	Uttar Pradesh	1975	1975	1	0	0	
Syed Modi Railway Stadium	Gorakhpur	Uttar Pradesh	1982	1983	2	0	0	
Dhyanchand Stadium	Jhansi	Uttar Pradesh	1984	1984	1	0	0	
Kamla Club Sports Ground	Kanpur	Uttar Pradesh	1987	2011	9	10	0	
**Green Park Stadium**	Kanpur	Uttar Pradesh	1945	2011	62	40	10	Hosted 21 Tests and 12 ODIs.
Ordnance Equipment Factory Ground	Kanpur	Uttar Pradesh	1993	2006	5	4	0	
IIT Stadia	Kanpur	Uttar Pradesh	2004	2010	2	6	0	
South Kanpur Stadium	Kanpur South	Uttar Pradesh	2004	2010	2	6	0	
CSA University Stadium	Kanpur North	Uttar Pradesh	2004	2010	2	6	0	
Panki Stadium	Kanpur (Panki)	Uttar Pradesh	2004	2010	2	6	0	
Police Lines Stadium	Kanpur	Uttar Pradesh	2004	2010	2	6	0	
Police Sports Stadium	Lakhimpur	Uttar Pradesh	1978	1978	1	0	0	
Chowk Stadium	Lucknow	Uttar Pradesh	1994	1994	1	1	0	
Dr. Akhilesh Das Stadium	Lucknow	Uttar Pradesh	2007	2010	3	0	0	
Dr. Ambedkar Stadium	Lucknow	Uttar Pradesh	2006	2006	0	1	0	
Gomti Nagar Stadium	Lucknow	Uttar Pradesh	1953	1954	2	0	0	
**K. D. Singh Babu Stadium**	Lucknow	Uttar Pradesh	1962	2006	21	8	0	Hosted one Test and an ODI.
La Martiniere College Ground	Lucknow	Uttar Pradesh	1950	1950	1	0	0	
Railways Recreation Ground	Lucknow	Uttar Pradesh	1942	1943	2	0	0	
**University Ground**	Lucknow	Uttar Pradesh	1952	1952	1	0	0	Hosted a Test in 1952, its only first-class game.
Bhamashah Stadium	Meerut	Uttar Pradesh	2003	2015	7	2	0	
Cantonment Board Ground	Meerut	Uttar Pradesh	1995	2002	1	2	0	
Sports Stadium (Civil Lines)	Meerut	Uttar Pradesh	1960	2011	9	3	0	
Narendra Mohan Sports Stadium	Mohan Nagar	Uttar Pradesh	1977	2010	9	0	0	
Railways Stadium (Moradabad)	Moradabad	Uttar Pradesh	1962	1987	4	0	0	
Teerthanker Mahaveer University Ground	Moradabad	Uttar Pradesh	2015	present	1	0	0	
Ch. Charan Singh Stadium	Muzaffarnagar	Uttar Pradesh	1975	2015	7	3	0	
Obera Sports Complex	Obera	Uttar Pradesh	1987	1987	1	0	0	
Indira Gandhi Stadium (Orai)	Orai	Uttar Pradesh	1986	1986	1	0	0	
Lalit Hari Sugar Factory Stadium	Pilibhit	Uttar Pradesh	1981	1983	2	0	0	
Government Inter College Ground	Saharanpur	Uttar Pradesh	1977	1977	1	0	0	
Central Hindu College Ground	Varanasi	Uttar Pradesh	1942	1960	7	0	0	
Dr. Sampurnanda Stadium	Varanasi	Uttar Pradesh	1964	2003	6	0	0	
Maharaja of Benares Palace Ground	Varanasi	Uttar Pradesh	1934	1934	1	0	0	

== Uttarakhand ==
Name	City	State	First used	Last used	F/C	LA	T20	Notes
Doon's School Ground	Dehradun	Uttarakhand	1951	1970	3	0	0	
National Defence Academy Ground	Dehradun	Uttarakhand	1950	1951	2	0	0	
**Rajiv Gandhi International Cricket Stadium**	Dehradun	Uttarakhand	2018	2018			3	Hosted one Test and 3 ODIs.
Indira Gandhi International Sports Stadium	Haldwani	Uttarakhand						
Udayraj Intercity Ground	Kashipur	Uttarakhand						Under Construction

== West Bengal ==
Name	City	First used	Last used	F/C	LA	T20	Notes
Bengal Cricket Academy Ground	Kalyani	2011	2015	1	4	0	
Burnpur Cricket Club Ground	Asansol	1994	2004	0	2	0	
Cooch Behar Stadium	Cooch Behar	2008	2008	—N/a			
Eastern Railway Divisional Stadium	Asansol	1982	1982	—N/a			
**Eden Gardens**	Kolkata	1864	2018	Hosted 41 Tests, 30 ODIs, 7 T20Is			
Gangarampur Stadium	Gangarampur	2001	2001	—N/a			
Jadavpur University Campus Ground	Jadavpur	2004	2018	5	—N/a		
Nehru Stadium	Durgapur	1974	1974	—N/a			
Raiganj Stadium	Raiganj	1997	2005	0	10+	0	
Jalpaiguri Stadium	Jalpaiguri	1999	2005	0	10+	0	

== Under construction stadiums ==
Stadium	Capacity	City	State	Tenant	Opening
ACA International Cricket Stadium	34,000	Vijayawada	Andhra Pradesh	Andhra Pradesh cricket team	
Anil Agarwal Stadium	75,000	Jaipur	Rajasthan	Rajasthan cricket team	
Barkatullah Stadium	50,000	Bhopal	Madhya Pradesh	Madhya Pradesh cricket team	
Bilaspur International Cricket Stadium	TBA	Bilaspur	Chhattisgarh	Chhattisgarh cricket team	
Dr Bhimrao Ambedkar International Cricket Stadium	30,000	Faizabad	Uttar Pradesh	Uttar Pradesh cricket team	
Goa Cricket Association Stadium	45,000	Pernem	Goa	Goa cricket team	
Gwalior International Cricket Stadium	60,000	Gwalior	Madhya Pradesh	Madhya Pradesh cricket team	
Jammu & Kashmir International Cricket Stadium	40,000	Jammu	Jammu and Kashmir	Jammu and Kashmir cricket team	
Kochi International Stadium	65,000	Kochi	Kerala	Kerala cricket team	
Rajgir International Cricket Stadium	40,000	Rajgir	Bihar	Bihar cricket team	
Udaipur International Cricket Stadium	35,000	Udaipur	Rajasthan	Rajasthan cricket team	TBA
Varanasi Cricket Stadium	30,000	Varanasi	Uttar Pradesh	Uttar Pradesh cricket team	
Bengaluru Stadium	80,000	Bengaluru	Karnataka	Karnataka cricket team	

== See also ==
- List of international cricket grounds in India
- List of stadiums in India
- List of field hockey venues in India
- List of football stadiums in India
- Venues of the 2010 Commonwealth Games
