= List of stadiums in India =

The following is a list of stadiums in India. Due to differences often arising between the planning and implementation stages for infrastructure in India, the list has been now divided into currently existing stadiums and future grounds.

== Current stadiums ==
=== Cricket stadiums ===
Image	Stadium	Capacity	City	State	Home team(s)	Sport(s)
Narendra Modi Stadium	Narendra Modi Stadium	132,000	Ahmedabad	Gujarat	Indian cricket team Gujarat Titans; Gujarat cricket team	Cricket
Eden Gardens	Eden Gardens	68,000	Kolkata	West Bengal	India national cricket team Bengal cricket team Kolkata Knight Riders	Cricket
SVNS International Cricket Stadium	Shaheed Veer Narayan Singh International Cricket Stadium	65,000	Raipur	Chhattisgarh	India national cricket team Chhattisgarh cricket team	Cricket
BRSABV Ekana Cricket Stadium	Bharat Ratna Shri Atal Bihari Vajpayee Ekana Cricket Stadium	50,100	Lucknow	Uttar Pradesh	Uttar Pradesh cricket team Lucknow Super Giants; India national cricket team Afghanistan national cricket team	Cricket
Greenfield International Stadium	Greenfield International Stadium	50,000	Thiruvananthapuram	Kerala	India national football team (2016–present); India national cricket team (2017–present); Kerala cricket team (2017–present)	Cricket; Football
Barsapara Cricket Stadium	Assam Cricket Association Stadium	46,000	Guwahati	Assam	India national cricket team, Assam cricket team	Cricket
Dr. DY Patil Sports Stadium	DY Patil Stadium	45,300	Navi Mumbai	Maharashtra	India; India national cricket team Mumbai cricket team Mumbai Indians	Cricket; Football
Vidarbha Cricket Association Stadium	Vidarbha Cricket Association Stadium	45,000	Nagpur	Maharashtra	India national cricket team, Vidarbha cricket team	Cricket
Barabati Stadium	Barabati Stadium	45,000	Cuttack	Odisha	India national cricket team, Odisha cricket team (1958–present); Odisha women's cricket team (1958–present); Odisha football team (1958–present); Odisha women's football team (1958–present)	Cricket
Saifai International Cricket Stadium	Saifai International Cricket Stadium	43,000	Saifai	Uttar Pradesh	Uttar Pradesh cricket team Major Dhyan Chand Sports College, Saifai	Cricket
MCA Cricket Stadium	Maharashtra Cricket Association Stadium	42,700	Pune	Maharashtra	India national cricket team, Pune Warriors India	Cricket
JSCA International Cricket Stadium	JSCA International Stadium Complex	40,000	Ranchi	Jharkhand	India national cricket team, Jharkhand cricket team	Cricket
Rajiv Gandhi International Cricket Stadium	Rajiv Gandhi International Cricket Stadium	39,200	Hyderabad	Telangana	India national cricket team Sunrisers Hyderabad; Hyderabad Cricket Association	Cricket
MA Chidambaram Stadium	M. A. Chidambaram Stadium	38,200	Chennai	Tamil Nadu	India national cricket team Tamil Nadu cricket team Chennai Super Kings	Cricket
Maharaja Yadavindra Singh International Cricket Stadium	Maharaja Yadavindra Singh International Cricket Stadium	38,000	New Chandigarh	Punjab	India national cricket team, Punjab cricket team, Punjab Kings	Cricket
Arun Jaitley Stadium	Arun Jaitley Cricket Stadium	35,200	New Delhi	Delhi NCR	India national cricket team, Delhi cricket team, Delhi Capitals	Cricket
	Baroda Cricket Association Stadium	35,000	Vadodara	Gujarat	Indian cricket team, Gujarat cricket team	Cricket
	Madan Paliwal Miraj Sports Centre	34,000	Rabcha, Nathdwara	Rajasthan	Rajasthan cricket team	Cricket
M. Chinnaswamy Stadium	M. Chinnaswamy Stadium	33,800	Bengaluru	Karnataka	India national cricket team Karnataka cricket team Royal Challengers Bangalore	Cricket
Wankhede Stadium	Wankhede Stadium	33,100	Mumbai	Maharashtra	India national cricket team, Mumbai cricket team, Mumbai Indians	Cricket
	Shrimant Madhavrao Scindia Cricket Stadium	30,000	Gwalior	Madhya Pradesh	India national cricket team, Madhya Pradesh cricket team	Cricket
Barkatullah Khan Stadium	Barkatullah Khan Stadium	30,000	Jodhpur	Rajasthan	India national cricket team, Rajasthan cricket team	Cricket
	Maharaja Bir Bikram College Stadium	30,000	Agartala	Tripura	Tripura cricket team	Cricket
	Indira Gandhi Stadium	30,000	Solapur	Maharashtra		Cricket
	Guru Gobind Singh Stadium	30,000	Nanded	Maharashtra	Maharashtra cricket team	Cricket
Holkar Cricket Stadium	Holkar Stadium	28,000	Indore	Madhya Pradesh	India national cricket team, Madhya Pradesh cricket team	Cricket
	Niranjan Shah Stadium	28,000	Rajkot	Gujarat	India national cricket team, Saurashtra cricket team	Cricket
	Nehru Stadium	27,000	Pune	Maharashtra	local cricket teams	Cricket
PCA Stadium Mohali	I. S. Bindra Stadium	26,000	Mohali	Punjab	India national cricket team, Punjab cricket team, Kings XI Punjab	Cricket
Dr. YS Rajasekhara Reddy International Cricket Stadium	ACA–VDCA Cricket Stadium	25,000	Visakhapatnam	Andhra Pradesh	India national cricket team, Andhra Pradesh cricket team	Cricket
Green Park Stadium	Green Park Stadium	25,000	Kanpur	Uttar Pradesh	India national cricket team, Uttar Pradesh cricket team, Kanpur Cricket Association	Cricket
Indira Gandhi Stadium	Indira Gandhi Stadium	25,000	Vijayawada	Andhra Pradesh	India national cricket team Andhra cricket team Andhra Cricket Association	Cricket
	K. D. Singh Babu Stadium	25,000	Lucknow	Uttar Pradesh	India national cricket team, Uttar Pradesh cricket team	Cricket; Football
	Moin-ul-Haq Stadium	25,000	Patna	Bihar	Bihar cricket team	Cricket
Rajiv Gandhi International Cricket Stadium Dehradun	Rajiv Gandhi International Cricket Stadium	25,000	Dehradun	Uttarakhand	Uttar Pradesh cricket team	Cricket
Sawai Mansingh Stadium Stadium	Sawai Mansingh Stadium	23,185	Jaipur	Rajasthan	India national cricket team, Rajasthan Royals, Rajasthan cricket team	Cricket
HPCA Stadium Dharamsala	Himachal Pradesh Cricket Association Stadium	21,200	Dharamshala	Himachal Pradesh	Himachal Pradesh cricket team	Cricket
	Brabourne Stadium	20,000	Mumbai	Maharashtra	India national cricket team, Mumbai cricket team	Cricket
	Dr. Akhilesh Das Gupta Stadium	20,000	Lucknow	Uttar Pradesh	Uttar Pradesh cricket team	Cricket
	Veer Surendra Sai Stadium	20,000	Sambalpur	Odisha	Odisha cricket team	Cricket
Keenan Stadium Jamshedpur	Keenan Stadium	19,000	Jamshedpur	Jharkhand	Jharkhand cricket team, Bihar cricket team	Cricket
	Moti Bagh Stadium	18,000	Vadodara	Gujarat	Baroda cricket team	Cricket
Captain Roop Singh Stadium Gwalior	Captain Roop Singh Stadium	18,000	Gwalior	Madhya Pradesh	Madhya Pradesh cricket team	Cricket
	Reliance Stadium	15,000	Vadodara	Gujarat	Baroda cricket team	Cricket
	Madhavrao Scindia Cricket Ground	15,000	Rajkot	Gujarat	Saurashtra cricket team	Cricket
	YS Raja Reddy Stadium	15,000	Kadapa	Andhra Pradesh	Andhra cricket team	Cricket
	Gangotri Glades Stadium	15,000	Mysore	Karnataka	Karnataka cricket team	Cricket
	Bhausaheb Bandodkar Ground	10,000	Panaji	Goa	Goa cricket team	Cricket
	Fort Maidan	10,000	Palakkad	Kerala		Cricket
	Nagaland Cricket Association Stadium	10,000	Chümoukedima	Nagaland	Nagaland cricket team	Cricket
	Chaudhary Bansi Lal Cricket Stadium	10,000	Rohtak	Haryana		Cricket
	Dhruve Pandove Stadium	10,000	Patiala	Punjab		Cricket
	Lalabhai Contractor Stadium	7,000	Surat	Gujarat		Cricket
	Tau Devi Lal Cricket Stadium	7,000	Panchkula	Haryana		Cricket
	Sher-e-Kashmir Stadium	5,000	Srinagar	Jammu and Kashmir	Jammu and Kashmir cricket team	Cricket
SCF Stadium	Salem Cricket Foundation Stadium	5,000	Salem	Tamil Nadu	Tamilnadu cricket team, Salem Spartans	Cricket
	Dr Rajendra Prasad Stadium	5,000	Margao	Goa	Goa cricket team	Cricket
	East Coast Railway Stadium	1,720	Bhubaneswar	Odisha	Odisha cricket team	Cricket

=== Football and athletics stadiums ===
Note. † denotes stadiums that have hosted international football matches.

#	Image	Stadium	Capacity	City	State	Home team(s)	Sport(s)
1		Salt Lake Stadium †	68,000	Bidhannagar	West Bengal	East Bengal, Mohun Bagan, Mohammedan	
2		Jawaharlal Nehru Stadium, Delhi †	60,254	New Delhi	Delhi	Punjab FC, SC Delhi	
3		Greenfield International Stadium †	50,000	Thiruvananthapuram	Kerala		
4		Kozhikode Corporation EMS Stadium †	50,000	Kozhikode	Kerala	Gokulam Kerala	
5		DY Patil Stadium †	45,300	Navi Mumbai	Maharashtra		
6		Jawarhalal Nehru International Stadium, Kaloor †	40,000	Kochi	Kerala	Kerala Blasters	
7		Birsa Munda Football Stadium	40,000	Ranchi	Jharkhand		
8		Jawaharlal Nehru Stadium †	40,000	Chennai	Tamil Nadu	Chennaiyin FC	
10		Mangala Stadium	40,000	Mangalore	Karnataka		
11		Kanchenjunga Stadium †	40,000	Siliguri	West Bengal		
12		JRD Tata Sports Complex	40,000	Jamshedpur	Jharkhand		
13		East Bengal Ground	40,000	Kolkata	West Bengal	East Bengal FC Aryan FC	
14		Khuman Lampak Main Stadium †	35,285	Imphal	Manipur	NEROCA FC, TRAU FC	
15		Ambedkar Stadium †	35,000	Delhi	Delhi	Delhi FC, HOPS FC, Sudeva Delhi	
16		Birsa Munda Athletics Stadium	35,000	Ranchi	Jharkhand		
17		Chhatrapati Shahu Stadium	30,000	Kolhapur	Maharashtra		
18		Guru Nanak Stadium	30,000	Ludhiana	Punjab		
19		Bhaichung Stadium	30,000	Namchi	Sikkim		
20		Bakshi Stadium	30,000	Srinagar	Jammu and Kashmir		
21		Malappuram District Sports Complex Stadium	30,000	Malappuram	Kerala	Kerala United FC, Malappuram FC	
22		Paljor Stadium	30,000	Gangtok	Sikkim	United Sikkim	
23		Jawaharlal Nehru Stadium (Coimbatore)	30,000	Coimbatore	Tamil Nadu		
24		Lal Bahadur Shastri Stadium	30,000	Hyderabad	Telangana		
25		Sree Kanteerava Stadium †	25,810	Bengaluru	Karnataka	Bengaluru FC	
26		Chandrasekharan Nair Stadium	25,000	Thiruvananthapuram	Kerala		
26		Lal Bahadur Shastri Stadium	25,000	Kollam	Kerala		
27		Bankimanjali Stadium	25,000	Naihati	West Bengal	Diamond Harbour	
28		K. D. Singh Babu Stadium, Lucknow	25,000	Lucknow	Uttar Pradesh		
29		Guru Gobind Singh Stadium	22,000	Jalandhar	Punjab		
30		Rabindra Sarobar Stadium †	22,000	Kolkata	West Bengal		
31		Indira Gandhi Athletic Stadium †	21,600	Guwahati	Assam	Inter Kashi, NorthEast United	
32		Ekana Football Stadium	20,000	Lucknow	Uttar Pradesh		
33		EKA Arena †	20,000	Ahmedabad	Gujarat		
34		Indira Gandhi Stadium (Kohima)	20,000	Kohima	Nagaland		
35		Mohun Bagan Ground †	20,000	Kolkata	West Bengal		
36		Rajiv Gandhi Stadium (Aizawl)	20,000	Aizawl	Mizoram		
37		Silli Stadium	20,000	Silli	Jharkhand		
38		Lal Bahadur Shastri Stadium	20,000	Akola	Maharastra		
39		Kalyani Stadium	20,000	Kalyani	West Bengal	United SC	
40		Jawaharlal Nehru Stadium (Margao) †	19,000	Margao	Goa	FC Goa	
41		G. M. C. Balayogi Athletic Stadium †	18,000	Hyderabad	Telangana	Sreenidi Deccan	
42		Jawaharlal Nehru Stadium †	17,000	Shillong	Meghalaya	Rangdajied United FC, Shillong Lajong	
43		Bangalore Football Stadium	15,000	Bengaluru	Karnataka	Bengaluru United, SC Bengaluru	
44		Barasat Stadium	15,000	Barasat	West Bengal		
45		Kalinga Stadium	15,000	Bhubaneswar	Odisha		
46		Calicut Medical College Stadium	15,000	Kozhikode	Kerala		
47		Golden Jubilee Stadium	15,000	Yupia	Arunachal Pradesh		
48		Mulna Stadium	15,000	Balaghat	Madhya Pradesh		
49		Nehru Stadium	15,000	Guwahati	Assam		
50		Rajendra Stadium	15,000	Siwan	Bihar		
51		Sailen Manna Stadium	15,000	Howrah	West Bengal		
52		Sumant Moolgaokar Stadium	15,000	Jamshedpur	Jharkhand		
53		Thrissur Municipal Corporation Stadium	15,000	Thrissur	Kerala		
54		Mohammedan Sporting Ground	14,000	Kolkata	West Bengal		
55		SAI Stadium	12,000	Kokrajhar	Assam		
56		Jorhat Stadium	12,000	Jorhat	Assam		
57		Kishore Bharati Krirangan	12,000	Jadavpur	West Bengal		
58		Shree Shiv Chhatrapati Sports Complex †	10,800	Pune	Maharashtra		
59		Dr. Rajendra Prasad Football Stadium	10,000	Neemuch	Madhya Pradesh		
60		Duler Stadium	10,000	Mapusa	Goa	Dempo SC	
61		Jorethang Ground	10,000	Jorethang	Sikkim		
62		Kottappadi Football Stadium	10,000	Malappuram	Kerala		
63		Mela Ground	10,000	Kalimpong	West Bengal		
64		TRC Turf Ground	10,000	Srinagar	Jammu & Kashmir		
65		KASA Stadium	9,000	Diphu	Assam		
66		Mumbai Football Arena †	7,000	Andheri, Mumbai	Maharashtra	Mumbai City FC	
67		Wahiajer Football Stadium	6,000	West Jaintia Hills district	Meghalaya		
67		Cooperage Football Stadium	5,000	Mumbai	Maharashtra		
68		Fr. Agnel Stadium	5,000	Navi Mumbai	Maharashtra		
69		Lammual Stadium	5,000	Aizawl	Mizoram		
70		Santipur Municipality Stadium	5,000	Santipur	West Bengal		
71		Tilak Maidan	5,000	Vasco da Gama	Goa		
72		Nehru Maidan, Duliajan	4,000	Duliajan	Assam		
73		GMC Athletic Stadium	3,000	Bambolim	Goa		

=== Field hockey stadiums ===
Image	Stadium	Capacity	City	State	Home team(s)	Sport(s)
Chandigarh Hockey Stadium	Chandigarh Hockey Stadium	30,000	Chandigarh	Punjab		Hockey
	Birsa Munda International Hockey Stadium	21,800	Rourkela	Odisha		Hockey
	Master Chandgiram Sports Stadium	20,000	Saifai	Uttar Pradesh		Hockey
	Major Dhyan Chand National Stadium	16,200	Delhi	Delhi NCR	International field hockey	Hockey
	Biju Patnaik Hockey Stadium	15,000	Rourkela	Odisha	Samaleswari Sports Club, Kalinga Lancers	Hockey
	Kalinga Hockey Stadium	15,000	Bhubaneswar	Odisha	Kalinga Lancers	Hockey
	Rajnandgaon International Hockey Stadium	15,000	Rajnandgaon	Chhattisgarh		Hockey
	Shilaroo Hockey Stadium	15,000	Shilaroo	Himachal Pradesh		Hockey
	Mohali International Hockey Stadium	13,648	Ajitgarh	Punjab		Hockey
	Balewadi Hockey Stadium	11,900	Pune	Maharashtra		Hockey
	Aishbagh Stadium	10,000	Bhopal	Madhya Pradesh		Hockey
	Shaheed Bhagat Singh Hockey Stadium	10,000	Firozpur	Punjab		Hockey
	Major Dhyan Chand Hockey Stadium, Lucknow	10,000	Lucknow	Uttar Pradesh		Hockey
	Mayor Radhakrishnan Hockey Stadium	8,670	Chennai	Tamil Nadu		Hockey
	Mahindra Hockey Stadium	8,250	Mumbai	Maharashtra		Hockey
	G. M. C. Balayogi Hockey Ground	8,000	Hyderabad	Telangana		Hockey
	Khuman Lampak Hockey Stadium	8,000	Imphal	Manipur		Hockey
	Bangalore Hockey Stadium	7,000	Bengaluru	Karnataka		Hockey
	Surjit Hockey Stadium	7,000	Jalandhar	Punjab		Hockey
	Shivaji Hockey Stadium	5,500	New Delhi	Delhi		Hockey
	Birsa Munda Hockey Stadium	5,000	Ranchi	Jharkhand		Hockey
	Major Dhyan Chand Hockey Stadium, Jhansi	5,000	Jhansi	Uttar Pradesh		Hockey
	PCMC Hockey Stadium	5,000	Pune	Maharashtra		Hockey
	Vidarbha Hockey Association Stadium	5,000	Nagpur	Maharashtra		Hockey
	Sardar Vallabhbhai Patel International Hockey Stadium	4,000	Raipur	Chhattisgarh		Hockey
	Kollam International Hockey Stadium	3,000	Kollam	Kerala		Hockey
	Maulana Md. Tayabullah Hockey Stadium	2,000	Guwahati	Assam		Hockey
	SDAT Astroturf Hockey Stadium	2,000	Kovilpatti	Tamil Nadu		Hockey
	Anna Hockey Stadium	n/a	Tiruchirappalli	Tamil Nadu		Hockey
	B.R. Yadav International Hockey Stadium	n/a	Bilaspur	Chhattisgarh		Hockey
	Rajgir Hockey Stadium	n/a	Rajgir	Bihar		Hockey
	Tau Devi Lal Hockey Stadium	n/a	Panchkula	Haryana		Hockey

=== Tennis stadiums ===
Image	Stadium	Capacity	City	State	Home team(s)	Sport(s)
	SDAT Tennis Stadium	5,800	Chennai	Tamil Nadu		Tennis
R.k Khanna Tennis Stadium	R. K. Khanna Tennis Complex	5,015	Delhi	Delhi NCR		Tennis

=== Indoor stadiums ===
Image	Stadium	Capacity	City	State	Home team(s)	Sport(s)
	Indira Gandhi Arena	14,348	Delhi	NCR	Local football teams	Indoor sports
	Netaji Indoor Stadium	12,000	Kolkata	West Bengal	Bengal Warriors	Indoor sports
Rajiv Gandhi Indoor Stadium	Rajiv Gandhi Indoor Stadium	10,000	Kochi	Kerala		Indoor sports
	Vivekananda Nagar Indoor Sports Complex	5,000	Nagpur	Maharashtra		Sports complex
	Campal Indoor Complex	4,000	Campal	Goa		Sports complex
	Dr. Shyama Prasad Mukherjee Indoor Stadium	4,000	Taleigão	Goa		Indoor sports

== Future projects ==
This list includes stadiums that are currently under construction or those still in planning stages. A few grounds from this list may be removed or scrapped completely in the planning stage itself.

Stadium	Capacity	City	State	Home team(s)	Sport(s)	Status
Mumbai Metropolitan Stadium	100,000	Mumbai	Maharashtra		Cricket	Planned
Suryanagar Cricket Stadium	80,000	Anekal	Karnataka		Cricket	Planned
Kochi International Stadium	65,000	Kochi	Kerala	Kerala cricket team	Cricket	
Indore Sports Complex	50,000	Indore	Madhya Pradesh	Madhya Pradesh cricket team Madhya Pradesh football team	Sports complex	
Barkatullah Stadium	50,000	Bhopal	Madhya Pradesh	Madhya Pradesh cricket team	Cricket	
Goa Cricket Association Stadium	45,000	Pernem	Goa	Goa cricket team	Cricket	
Anil Agarwal Cricket Stadium	40,000 (first stage); 75,000 (planned)	Chonp, Jaipur	Rajasthan	Rajasthan cricket team	Cricket	Halted construction
Rajgir International Cricket Stadium	40,000	Rajgir	Bihar	Bihar cricket team	Cricket	
Jammu & Kashmir International Cricket Stadium	40,000	Jammu	Jammu and Kashmir	Jammu and Kashmir cricket team	Cricket	
Khargarh Football Stadium	40,000	Navi Mumbai	Maharashtra	Mumbai City FC	Football	
Mawkhanu Football Stadium	40,000	New Shillong	Meghalaya		Football	U/C
Udaipur International Cricket Stadium	35,000	Udaipur	Rajasthan	Rajasthan cricket team	Cricket	Paused
ACA International Cricket Stadium-Mangalagiri	34,000	Vijayawada	Andhra Pradesh	Andhra Pradesh cricket team	Cricket	
Varanasi Cricket Stadium	30,000	Varanasi	Uttar Pradesh	Uttar Pradesh cricket team	Cricket	
Dr Bhimrao Ambedkar International Cricket Stadium	30,000	Faizabad	Uttar Pradesh	Uttar Pradesh cricket team	Cricket	
Tripura International Cricket Stadium	22,000	Narsingarh	Tripura	Tripura cricket team	Cricket	U/C
Bilaspur International Cricket Stadium	TBA	Bilaspur	Chhattisgarh	Chhattisgarh cricket team	Cricket	
Dr Bhimrao Ambedkar Hockey Stadium	TBA	Faizabad	Uttar Pradesh	Uttar Pradesh field hockey team	Hockey	
Jaypee Sport City Hockey Stadium	TBA	Noida	Uttar Pradesh	Uttar Pradesh field hockey team	Hockey	

== See also ==
- Lists of stadiums
- List of cricket grounds in India
- List of international cricket grounds in India
- Cricket in India
- List of football stadiums in India
- List of field hockey venues in India
- List of indoor arenas in India
