= List of cricket grounds in Rajasthan =

This is a list of cricket grounds in Rajasthan that have been used for senior cricket matches, including all first-class, List A and Twenty20 cricket games.

== International venues ==
| Name | City | First used | Last used | F/C | LA | T20 | Notes |
|---|---|---|---|---|---|---|---|
| Sawai Mansingh Stadium | Jaipur | 1969 | 2021 | 35 | 35 | 37 | Hosted one Test and 18 ODIs. |
| Barkatullah Khan Stadium | Jodhpur | 1985 | 2002 | 5 | 3 | 0 | Hosted two ODIs.m |

== Domestic venues ==
| Name | City | First used | Last used | F/C | LA | T20 | Notes |
|---|---|---|---|---|---|---|---|
| Mayo College Ground | Ajmer | 1926 | 1986 | 19 | 0 | 0 | |
| Indira Gandhi Stadium | Alwar | 1993 | 1995 | 4 | 4 | 0 | |
| Sanajan Dharma Government College Ground | Beawar | 1981 | 1981 | 1 | 0 | 0 | |
| Municipal Ground | Bhilwara | 1980 | 1987 | 3 | 0 | 0 | |
| Sukhadia Stadium | Bhilwara | 1995 | 1998 | 1 | 3 | 0 | |
| Shivraj Stadium | Bhinmal | 1985 | 1985 | 1 | 0 | 0 | |
| Northern Railway Stadium | Bikaner | 1976 | 1995 | 5 | 2 | 0 | |
| Chaugan Stadium | Jaipur | 1953 | 1986 | 4 | 0 | 0 | |
| KL Saini Ground | Jaipur | 1991 | 2009 | 37 | 19 | 0 | |
| Maharaja College Ground (Jaipur) | Jaipur | 1961 | 1989 | 3 | 0 | 0 | |
| Neerja Modi School Ground | Jaipur | 2004 | 2004 | 0 | 5 | 0 | |
| Railway Cricket Ground | Jaipur | 1964 | 1989 | 9 | 0 | 0 | |
| Sawai Mansingh Stadium | Jaipur | 1969 | 2011 | 35 | 35 | 37 | Hosted one Test and 18 ODIs. |
| Sports Complex | Jhalawar | 2005 | 2007 | 3 | 0 | 0 | |
| Barkatullah Khan Stadium | Jodhpur | 1985 | 2002 | 5 | 3 | 0 | Hosted two ODIs. |
| Northern Railway Cricket Ground | Jodhpur | 1970 | 1972 | 2 | 0 | 0 | |
| Khetri Copper Complex Stadium | Khetri Nagar | 1981 | 1981 | 1 | 0 | 0 | |
| International Cricket Stadium | Kota | 1974 | 2010 | 6 | 1 | 0 | |
| Umed Club Ground | Kota | 1976 | 1976 | 1 | 0 | 0 | |
| Bhupal Noble's College Ground | Udaipur | 1957 | 1963 | 15 | 0 | 0 | |
| Field Club Ground | Udaipur | 2001 | 2010 | 3 | 5 | 0 | |
| Maharana Bhupal College Ground | Udaipur | 1968 | 2006 | 11 | 11 | 0 | |
| Maharana Bhupal Stadium | Udaipur | 1982 | 1983 | 2 | 0 | 0 | |
| Railway Institute Ground | Udaipur | 1956 | 1956 | 1 | 0 | 0 | |

== Proposed venue ==
| Stadium | Capacity | City | Tenant | Opening | Notes |
|---|---|---|---|---|---|
| Udaipur International Cricket Stadium | 35,000 | Udaipur | Rajasthan cricket team | TBA | |
| Rajasthan Cricket Association Stadium | 50,000 | Jaipur | Rajasthan cricket team | TBA | BCCI lifted ban on RCA on 7 September 2019, making way for new international stadium in Jaipur along with 250 cr of fund. |
