= Raja Raghuraj Singh Stadium =

Cricket ground in Chhattisgarh, India

- Interactive map of Raja Raghuraj Singh Stadium

Ground information
- Location: Bilaspur, Chhattisgarh
- Country: India
- Coordinates: 22.07860°N 82.15193°E
- Establishment: 1978
- End names
- n/a

Team information
Madhya Pradesh cricket team	(1978-1981)
Chhattisgarh cricket team	(2000-present)
- As of 25 August 2015; Source: Cricinfo

Raja Raghuraj Singh Stadium is a cricket ground is Bilaspur, Chhattisgarh. The stadium has hosted three Ranji matches in 1978, 1979 and 1981 between Madhya Pradesh cricket team against Vidarbha cricket team and two games against Railways cricket team.

== See also ==
- International Hockey Stadium, Rajnandgaon
- Jayanti Stadium
- Pandit Ravishankar Shukla Stadium
- Raipur International Hockey Stadium
- Shaheed Veer Narayan Singh International Cricket Stadium
