= Osmania College, Kurnool =

- Motto: Lead Kindly Light
- Type: Aided
- Established: 1947
- Founder: Dr. M. Abdul Haq
- Affiliations: Rayalaseema University
- Principal: Dr Syed Samiuddun Muzammil
- Director: Mrs. Azra Javed
- Location: Kurnool, Andhra Pradesh, India, Kurnool, Andhra Pradesh, India; 15.827°N 78.047°E
- Campus: Urban
- Nickname: OCK
- Website: osmaniacollegekurnool.com

Osmania College, Kurnool is a college in Kurnool, Andhra Pradesh, India. It was established in 1947 by philanthropist Dr. M. Abdul Haq who approached the Nizam of Hyderabad - Mir Osman Ali Khan to raise funds for its establishment and the Nizam granted a capital of 0.2 million INR at that time.

It is the first degree college in Kurnool in Rayalaseema and one of oldest in Andhra Pradesh state. It is a minority institution, recognized by UGC under Section 2(f) and 12(b) of the UGC Act of 1956. It has been affiliated to Rayalaseema University, Kurnool from 2010.

The college is on a campus of 9.5 acres. Osmania College has a large library with ancient moral paintings and some rare books.

== Academics ==
Osmania College offers courses in Arts, Humanities, Social Sciences, Sciences, Commerce, Management and Computer Applications at the undergraduate level, besides M.A. (English Literature), M.Sc. (Physics), M.Sc. (Organic Chemistry) and M.Com. (Professional) at post-graduate level.
