= Osmania College Ground =

Sports venue in Kurnool, Andhra Pradesh, India

- Full name: Osmania College Ground
- Location: Kurnool, Andhra Pradesh
- Owner: Osmania College
- Operator: Osmania College
- Capacity: n/a

Website
- ESPNcricinfo

Osmania College Ground is a sports venue located in Kurnool, Andhra Pradesh. The ground also has reasonable sports facilities in the form a football/cricket ground, an outdoor basketball court with lighting facility, a tennis court, volleyball court and a Table Tennis room. The ground has hosted a Ranji Trophy match in 1972 when Andhra cricket team played against Kerala cricket team as match ended in a drawn. The ground is owned and managed by Osmania College.
