= Rajaram Maidan =

Cricket stadium in Ichalkaranji, Maharashtra, India

Rajaram Cricket Stadium
- Interactive map of Rajaram Cricket Stadium
- Location: Ichalkaranji, Maharashtra, India
- Country: India
- Capacity: 20,000

The Rajaram Cricket Stadium is located in Ichalkaranji, in the Indian state of Maharashtra. The venue has a capacity of 20,000 and most of the places are standing places. The stands are covered with a roof. It is used for several events, but mainly for cricket matches. The stadium became one of the largest sports venues by capacity in the Indian state of Maharashtra. The construction of the stadium started in 1987 and it opened in 2002.
