= Amar Singh Club Ground =

Sports venue in Srinagar, Jammu and Kashmir, India

- Amar Singh Club
- Interactive map of Amar Singh Club Ground

Ground information
- Location: Srinagar, Jammu & Kashmir, India
- Country: India
- Coordinates: 34.072°N 74.835°E
- Establishment: 1960
- Capacity: n/a
- Last used: 1999
- End names
- n/a

Team information
Jammu and Kashmir cricket team	(1960–1999)
- As of 27 August 2015; Source: ESPNcricinfo

Amar Singh Club Ground is ground in Srinagar, in Jammu and Kashmir, India. The ground is part of the Amar Singh Club which was in the year 1933. The ground was named memory of after Raja Amar Singh by his son Maharaja Hari Singh. The ground is located in the 10 acre of land with facilities of one tennis court, badminton court and two Squash courts as well as 12 rooms. The ground has hosted cricket matches from 1960 and 1999 since then cricket in not played the ground. The ground was home of Jammu and Kashmir cricket team when they made a first-class debut and hosted 39 matches as well as a List A matches.
