= Maharaja of Benares Palace Ground =

Stadium in Varanasi, India

- Full name: Maharaja of Benares Palace Ground
- Location: Varanasi, Purvanchal
- Owner: Maharaja of Benares
- Operator: Maharaja of Benares
- Capacity: n/a

Construction
- Groundbreaking: 1934
- Opened: 1934

Tenants
- United Provinces cricket team (1934-1942)

Website
- ESPNcricinfo

Maharaja of Benares Palace Ground was a multipurpose stadium in Varanasi. The ground was mainly used for organizing matches of football, cricket and other sports. The stadium has hosted five first-class match in 1934 when Maharaj Kumar of Vizianagram's XI played against Marylebone Cricket Club on historic tour of Marylebone Cricket Club in India and Ceylon in 1933/34. The ground hosted two more first-class matches in 1940 to 1942, both of United Provinces cricket team against Hyderabad cricket team and Bengal cricket team. The stadium has hosted non-first-class matches when Benares Hindu University played against Patna University.

== Ranji Trophy matches ==
#	Team 1	Team 2	Winner	Year
1	Vizianagram's XI	MCC	Vizianagram's XI	1934
2	United Provinces	Rajasthan	United Provinces	1940
3	United Provinces	Madhya Pradesh	Drawn	1942
