= Jubilee Maidan Ground =

Multi purpose stadium in Bhuj, Kutch

- Full name: Jubilee Maidan Ground
- Location: Bhuj, Kutch

Construction
- Groundbreaking: 1976
- Opened: 1976

Website
- ESPNcricinfo

Jubilee Maidan Ground is a multi purpose stadium in Bhuj, Kutch, Gujarat, India. The ground is mainly used for organizing matches of football, cricket and other sports. The stadium has hosted five first-class matches in 1973 when Saurashtra cricket team played against Baroda cricket team. The ground hosted four more first-class matches in 1978 and 1980 but since then the stadium has not hosted any matches.
