= Town Planning Authority Ground =

Stadium in Dharwar, Karnataka

- Full name: Town Planning Authority Ground
- Location: Dharwar, Karnataka
- Capacity: n/a

Construction
- Groundbreaking: 1985
- Opened: 1985

Website
- Cricinfo

Town Planning Authority Ground is a multi purpose stadium in Dharwar, Karnataka. The ground is mainly used for organizing matches of football, cricket and other sports. The stadium hosted one first-class match. In 1973, the Karnataka cricket team played against Tamil Nadu, but since then the stadium has not hosted any cricket matches.
