= Dr Bhimrao Ambedkar Stadium =

Main stadium in Bijapur, Karanataka, India

Dr Ambedkar Stadium
- Ambedkar Stadium
- Full name: Dr Bhimrao Ambedkar Stadium
- Former names: District Stadium
- Location: Bijapur, Karanataka
- Owner: Vijayapura Mahanagara Palike
- Operator: Vijayapura Mahanagara Palike
- Capacity: n/a

Construction
- Built: 1969

Website
- ESPNcricinfo

Dr Ambedkar Stadium or District Stadium is a main stadium in city of Bijapur, Karanataka. The ground has four Ranji Trophy matches from 1969 to 1995 including one match for Mysore cricket team in 1969. The ground was also host for Ranji One Day Trophy between Karnataka cricket team and Hyderabad cricket team in 1995. The match international cricketers like Vijay Bharadwaj, Venkatapathy Raju, Anil Kumble, Sunil Joshi, Mohammad Azharuddin and Venkatesh Prasad. The ground is named after Dr Bhimrao Ambedkar.
