= Western Railway Stadium =

Multi purpose stadium in Bhavnagar, Saurashtra, India

- Full name: Western Railway Stadium
- Location: Bhavnagar, Saurashtra
- Owner: Western Railway
- Operator: Western Railway
- Capacity: 5,000

Construction
- Groundbreaking: 1962
- Opened: 1962

Website
- Cricinfo

Western Railway Stadium is a multi purpose stadium in Bhavnagar, Saurashtra. The ground is mainly used for organizing matches of football, cricket and other sports. The stadium has hosted three first-class matches in 1962 when Saurashtra cricket team played against Maharashtra cricket team. The ground hosted four more first-class matches from 1967 to 1981 but since then the stadium has not hosted any matches.
