= Postal Ground =

Cricket ground in Yavatmal, Vidarbha, India

Coordinates: 20°23′40″N 78°07′45″E

- Interactive map of Postal Ground

Ground information
- Location: Yavatmal, India
- Country: India
- Establishment: 1985 (first recorded match)

Team information
Vidarbha	(1985 & 1989)
- As of 29 October 2011; Source: Ground profile

Postal Ground is a cricket ground in Yavatmal, Vidarbha, India. The ground has held two first-class matches, the first of which came in the 1985/86 Ranji Trophy when Vidarbha played the Railways, while the second saw Madhya Pradesh as the visitors in the 1989/90 Ranji Trophy.
