= South Gujarat Cricket Association Ground =

Cricket ground in Surat, Gujarat, India

- SGCA Ground

Ground information
- Location: Surat, Gujarat
- Establishment: 1967
- Capacity: n/a
- End names
- n/a

Team information
Gujarat cricket team	(TBA)
- As of 25 August 2015; Source: Cricinfo

South Gujarat Cricket Association Ground is a cricket ground in the city of Surat in Gujarat, India. The hosted two Ranji Trophy matches for Gujarat cricket team against Baroda cricket team in 1967 and Saurashtra cricket team in 1972. The ground owned by South Gujarat Cricket Association.

== See also ==
List of tourist attractions in Surat
