= Prakasam Stadium =

Cricket ground in Guntur, India

Ground information
- Location: Guntur, India
- Country: India

Team information
Andhra Pradesh	(1958/59)
- As of 16 January 2012; Source: Ground profile

Prakasam Stadium was a cricket ground in Guntur, Andhra Pradesh, India. The ground held two first-class matches in the 1958/59 Ranji Trophy, with Andhra Pradesh playing Hyderabad and Mysore.
