= Wadia Park Ground =

Sports stadium in Maharashtra

Ahmednagar - Wadia Park Ground
- Interactive map of Ahmednagar - Wadia Park Ground
- Location: Ahmednagar, Maharashtra
- Coordinates: 19°5′16″N 74°44′1″E
- Capacity: 30,000

Construction
- Groundbreaking: 1957
- Opened: 1957
- Main contractor: M/s M. R. Mutha

Tenant
- Maharashtra cricket team (1957-1979)

Website
- Cricinfo

Wadia Park is a multi purpose stadium in Ahmednagar, Maharashtra. The ground is mainly used for organizing matches of football, cricket and other sports. The stadium hosted six first-class matches between 1957 and 1979. The first match was on 7 December 1957, where Maharashtra and Baroda played to a draw. The stadium has not hosted any top cricket matches since.

It is home to the Maharashtra District Sports Office.

There is also a running track, a swimming pool, a gymnastic hall, tennis courts, a basketball court and a badminton court, among others.
