= Teka Naka Ground =

Cricket ground in Hinganghat, Vidarbha, India

- taka ground

Ground information
- Location: Hinganghat, India
- Establishment: 1982 (first recorded match)

Team information
Vidarbha	(1982)
- As of 29 October 2011; Source: Ground profile

Teka Naka Ground is a cricket ground in Hinganghat, Vidarbha, India. The ground held a single first-class match when Vidarbha played Rajasthan in the 1982/83 Ranji Trophy, which resulted in a Rajasthan victory by 5 wickets.
