= Jubilee Field Ground =

Multipurpose stadium in Nagaon, Assam, India

- Full name: Jubilee Field Ground
- Location: Nagaon, Assam
- Owner: Nagaon Municipality Board
- Operator: Nagaon Municipality Board
- Capacity: 5,000

Construction
- Groundbreaking: 1958
- Opened: 1958

Website
- ESPNcricinfo

Jubilee Field Ground is a multipurpose stadium in Nagaon, Assam, India. The ground is mainly used for organizing matches of football, cricket and other sports. The stadium has hosted a Ranji Trophy match in 1951 when Assam cricket team played against Orissa cricket team but since then the stadium has hosted non-first-class matches.
