= Indian Farmers' Fertilisers Co-Operative Udyognagar Stadium =

Building in Gujarat, India

- Udyognagar Stadium
- Full name: Indian Farmers' Fertilisers Co-Operative Udyognagar Stadium
- Former names: Udyognagar Stadium
- Location: Gandhidham, Kutch
- Capacity: n/a

Construction
- Groundbreaking: 1984
- Opened: 1984

Website
- ESPNcricinfo

Indian Farmers' Fertilisers Co-Operative Udyognagar Stadium or Udyognagar Stadium is a multi purpose stadium in Gandhidham, Kutch. The ground is mainly used for organizing matches of football, cricket and other sports. The stadium hosted three first-class matches in 1985 when Saurashtra cricket team played against Bombay cricket team. The hosted two matches against Baroda cricket team in 1986 and Mumbai cricket team in 2000 but since then the stadium has hosted non first-class cricket matches.
