= Ambajhari Ordinance Factory Ground =

Cricket ground in Nagpur, Vidarbha, India

Coordinates: 21.13587°N 78.97740°E

Ambajhari Ordnance Factory Ground
- Interactive map of Ambajhari Ordnance Factory Ground

Ground information
- Location: Nagpur, Vidarbha
- Country: India
- Establishment: 1980 (first recorded match)
- Capacity: n/a
- End names
- n/a

Team information
Vidarbha	(1980–2002)
- As of 27 August, 2015; Source: Ground profile

Ambajhari Ordnance Factory Ground is a ground in campus of Ambajhari Ordnance Factory in Nagpur, Vidarbha. The ground has hosted non-first-class matches from 1980 to 2002 and since then the ground is not used. In 1980, the ground has hosted a first-class match when Vidarbha cricket team and Uttar Pradesh cricket team in Ranji Trophy.
