= Tamil Nadu Agricultural University Ground =

Multi purpose stadium of the college

- Full name: Tamil Nadu Agricultural University Ground
- Former names: Tamil Nadu Agricultural Research Institute Ground
- Location: Coimbatore, Tamil Nadu
- Owner: Tamil Nadu Agricultural University
- Operator: Tamil Nadu Agricultural University
- Capacity: 5,000

Construction
- Groundbreaking: 1965
- Opened: 1965

Website
- Cricinfo

Tamil Nadu Agricultural Research Institute Ground is a multi purpose stadium in Coimbatore, Tamil Nadu. The ground is mainly used for organizing matches of football, cricket and other sports. The stadium has hosted three Ranji Trophy match in 1965 when Madras cricket team played against Andhra cricket team. The ground hosted two more Ranji Trophy matches in 1976 when Tamil Nadu cricket team played against Andhra cricket team and again in 1990 when Tamil Nadu cricket team played against Karnataka cricket team but since then the stadium has hosted non-first-class matches.
