= Vizzy Stadium =

Stadium in Vizianagram, Andhra Pradesh, India

- Vizzy Stadium
- Full name: Vizzy Stadium
- Location: Vizianagram, Andhra Pradesh
- Owner: Andhra Cricket Association
- Operator: Andhra Cricket Association
- Capacity: 5,000

Construction
- Groundbreaking: 1995
- Opened: 1995
- Cost: ₹ 5 crore

Website
- Cricinfo

Vizzy Stadium is a cricket team in Vizianagram, Andhra Pradesh. The stadium hosted three first-class matches in 1995 when Andhra cricket team played against Tamil Nadu cricket team.

The stadium hosted five List A matches in 1995 when Andhra cricket team played against Tamil Nadu cricket team since then the ground has hosted some non-first-class matches. Sir Vijji is a Cricketing name of Maharaj Kumar Vijay Anand Gajapati Raj Bahadur, Prince of Vizianagaram Princely State. He was Indian Cricket Team Captain and Chairman BCCI in British India in 1930s.
