= Rajendrasinhji Stadium, Pune =

Sports stadium in Pune, Maharashtra, India

Rajendrasinhji Stadium
- Full name: Rajendrasinhji Stadium
- Location: Pune, Maharashtra
- Owner: Pune Municipal Corporation
- Operator: Pune Municipal Corporation
- Capacity: n/a

Construction
- Groundbreaking: 1952
- Opened: 1952
- Closed: 1960

Website
- Cricinfo

Rajendrasinhji Stadium is a sports stadium in Pune, Maharashtra. The ground is mainly used for organizing matches of football, cricket and other sports. The stadium has hosted a Ranji Trophy match in 1960 when Maharashtra cricket team played against Saurashtra cricket team. Before this the stadium has hosted non-first-class matches when Inter Services Tournament was played in 1952–3 since then, the ground has not hosted any match.
