= Akola Cricket Club Ground =

Cricket ground in Akola, Vidarbha, India

Coordinates: 20°42′46.81″N 77°0′07.11″E

- Interactive map of Akola Cricket Club Ground

Ground information
- Location: Akola, India
- Country: India
- Establishment: 1983 (first recorded match)

Team information
Vidarbha	(1983–1984)
- As of 29 October 2011; Source: Ground profile

Akola Cricket Club Ground is a cricket ground in Akola, Vidarbha, India. The ground has held two first-class matches, the first of which came in the 1983/84 Ranji Trophy when Vidarbha played the Railways, while the second saw Rajasthan as the visitors in the 1984/85 Ranji Trophy.

The ground is open 24/7 and is well maintained. It is a choice location of many people for daily cricket practice.
