= Jafar Maidan =

Cricket ground in Junagadh, Saurashtra, India

Jaffar Maidan
Ground information
- Location: Junagadh, Saurashtra, India
- Country: India
- Capacity: n/a
- End names
- n/a

Team information
| Saurashtra cricket team | (1942–1973) |
- As of 31 August, 2015; Source: ESPNcricinfo

Jafar Maidan is a cricket ground in Junagadh, Saurashtra, India. The ground hosted its Ranji Trophy match when the Western India cricket team played against Nawanagar cricket team in November 1942. The ground hosted three more first-class matches before its disappearance from cricket in 1973. The ground eventually became a grassland. Since then the city does not have a cricket ground. After nearly four decades, now a domestic-level cricket ground is being developed at Vivekanand School Ground.

In 2013, the ground was renovated to become a stadium with Gujarat Sport Authority at a cost of ₹ 10 crore.

Jafar Maidan has a heliport opposite the Mother Dairy Fruit & Vegetable Private Limited manufacturing plant. Regular flights were made in the past for helicopter service provided on Mount Girnar. Otherwise it is used for visiting VIPs.
