= Northern Railway Divisional Sports Association Stadium =

Building in India

- Location: Allahabad, Uttar Pradesh
- Country: India
- Owner: Northern Indian Railways
- Operator: Northern Railway Divisional Sports Associations

Northern Railway Divisional Sports Association Stadium is a multi-purposed stadium located in Allahabad, Uttar Pradesh. The stadium is a multi-purpose stadium used for different games. It is a home ground for Uttar Pradesh cricket team for domestic matches and hosted two Ranji Trophy matches in 1966 against Vidarbha cricket team and Rajasthan cricket team. The stadium is governed by Northern Railway Divisional Sports Associations. The stadium is owned by Northern Indian Railways.
