= Andhra Jateva Kalashala Ground =

Cricket ground in Machilipatnam, India

Ground information
- Location: Machilipatnam, India
- Country: India
- Establishment: 1984 (first recorded match)

Team information
Andhra Pradesh	(1984)
- As of 29 October 2011; Source: Ground profile

Andhra Jateva Kalashala Ground was a cricket ground in Machilipatnam, Andhra Pradesh, India. The only recorded match held on the ground came in December 1984 when Andhra Pradesh played a first-class match in the 1983/84 Ranji Trophy against Hyderabad, which Hyderabad won by 8 wickets.
