= Police Parade Ground (Anantapur) =

Cricket ground

- Interactive map of Police Parade Ground
- Location: Anantapur, Andhra Pradesh, India
- Country: India
- Coordinates: 14.6746°N 77.5939°E
- Establishment: 1962
- Tenants: Andhra cricket team
- Last used: 2009
- As of 14 April 2023; Source: ESPNcricinfo

Police Parade Ground formerly known as Police Training College Ground is a cricket ground in Anantapur, Andhra Pradesh, India. It was used as the home ground for Andhra cricket team. The ground was first used on 28 December 1962 to host a first-class match between Andhra and Hyderabad in the 1962–63 Ranji Trophy. It hosted four Women's first-class matches in the 2008–09 Inter State Women's Competition. Eight Women's List A matches of the 2008–09 Senior Women's One Day League were also played on this ground.
