= Rayalaseema University =

Indian university in Kurnool, Andhra Pradesh

- Type: State university
- Established: 2008; 18 years ago
- Chancellor: Governor of Andhra Pradesh
- Vice-Chancellor: Dr. Vudata Venkata Basava Rao
- Location: Kurnool, Andhra Pradesh, India; 15.775°N 78.063°E
- Website: www.rayalaseemauniversity.ac.in

Rayalaseema University is a state university located in Kurnool, Andhra Pradesh, India.

== History ==
Rayalaseema University came into existence, fulfilling the long-cherished dream of people of Kurnool district in the year 2008, by Act No. 29 of 2008 enacted by the Legislature of the State of Andhra Pradesh and published in the Andhra Pradesh Gazette on 24 September 2008. The Establishment of Rayalaseema University is part of the vision of Government of Andhra Pradesh to promote access, equity, and inclusiveness in Higher Education. It has its jurisdiction over Kurnool.

The Postgraduate Center at Kurnool was started by Sri Venkateswara University in 1977 with a view to imparting higher education especially to the rural youth of the backward District of Kurnool in the drought-prone region of Rayalaseema. The University established the Postgraduate Center with two courses, one in Economics with specialization in Area Planning and Regional Development, the other in Operations Research and Statistical Quality Control to cater to the needs of the industry. The centre was housed in a small building to start with and later, in 1979, was shifted to the old municipal office buildings. Two more courses, in Physics and Chemistry, were added in 1979. State Bank of India offered a chair for the post of Professor in Fine Arts in memory of Sri Damodaram Sanjeevaiah in 1983 for undertaking research which was later converted and established as Department of Telugu in 1985. The center was shifted to University-owned building at B.Tandrapadu, a small village near Kurnool, in 1990.

In 1993 the affiliation of the centre was transferred to Sri Krishnadevaraya University. MSc Computer Science started in 1998 and later Management, MCA and Mathematics were started in the year 2001 and courses in Botany, Organic Chemistry, and Zoology were started in the year 2006. With the establishment of Rayalaseema University, MA in English and MEd courses were started in the academic year 2008–09; and MSc in Biotechnology in the academic year 2009–10. MCom and MSc in Electronics and Communications were started in 2012–13.

=== Department of Computer Science ===
The department started with MSc Computer Science in 1998 and later MCA in the year 2001. The center has excellent computer laboratory and library with huge number of books. Many students from Computer Science and Applications departments got jobs in Major IT companies and MNC's. More than 100+ students from M.Sc (CS) and M.C.A are working abroad.

=== Engineering College ===
Rayalaseema University has also started Engineering College from the academic year 2019–2020. This is the first and only Govt Engineering College in Kurnool district.

== Campus ==
Situated on Kurnool-Nandyal highway, a campus of over 300+ acres of land, the university includes a Computer Centre, a Health Center, a gymnasium, an outdoor stadium, an auditorium and space to accommodate departments of studies, laboratories, hostels, and housing for the staff.
