= Vivekananda Nagar Indoor Sports Complex =

Indoor sports stadium at Nagpur, India

- Interactive map of Vivekananda Nagar Indoor Sports Complex
- Full name: Vivekananda Nagar Indoor Sports Complex
- Former names: Indoor Sports Complex
- Location: Vivekananda Nagar, Nagpur, Maharashtra
- Coordinates: 21.18138323°N 79.07707171°E
- Capacity: 5,000

Construction
- Groundbreaking: 2014
- Opened: 2014

Vivekananda Nagar Indoor Sports Complex is an indoor stadium located in Nagpur, Maharashtra. The stadium was constructed on 3.5 acres of land allotted by the Nagpur Municipal Corporation for events of Table Tennis, Badminton etc. The stadium has a seating capacity of 5,000. The venue hosts several political events, concerts and sports events like badminton, basketball, lawn tennis.

The stadium is second indoor venue in the city and 3 603 square meter area with parking of 300 two-wheelers and 50 four-wheelers. This first sporting venue in South-West Nagpur facilities of a cafeteria, administrative office along with changing rooms and toilets which cost 3 crores for construction.
