= SDAT Astroturf Hockey Stadium =

Field hockey stadium in Kovilpatti, Tamil Nadu, India

SDAT Astroturf Hockey Stadium Kovilpatti
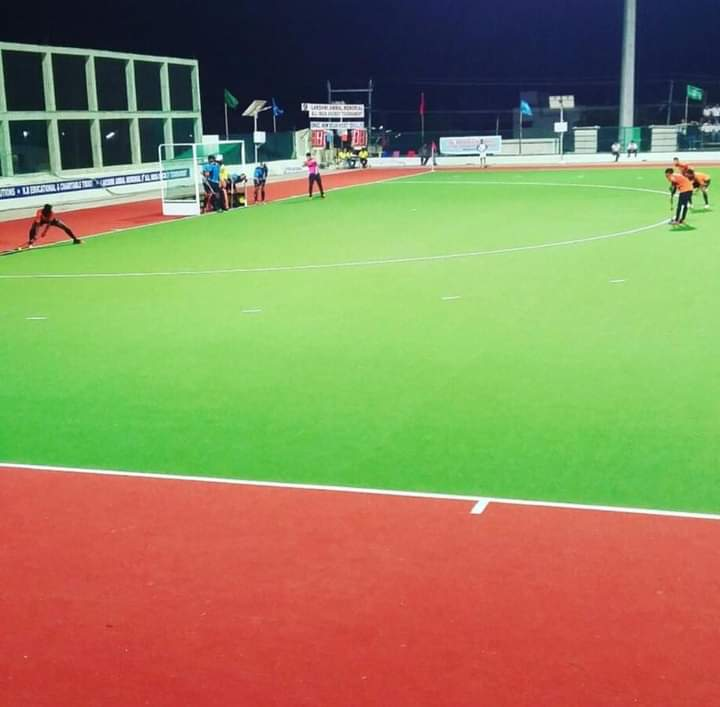
- entrance of the stadium
- Interactive map of SDAT Astroturf Hockey Stadium Kovilpatti
- Full name: SDAT Astroturf Hockey Stadium Kovilpatti
- Location: Kovilpatti, Tamil Nadu, India
- Coordinates: 9.1618°N 77.8544°E
- Owner: Sports Development Authority of Tamil Nadu
- Capacity: 2,000
- Surface: Artificial Turf
- Public transit: Two wheeler and TNSTC Bus

Construction
- Built: 2016
- Opened: 2017
- Cost: ₹7 crore (US$730,000)

SDAT Astroturf Hockey Stadium is situated in Kovilpatti, Thoothukudi District in the Indian state of Tamil Nadu.

SDAT Astroturf Hockey Stadium Kovilpatti is a field hockey stadium at Kovilpatti, Tamil Nadu, India. Stadium is Located at the foot of the Kathiresan malai murugan kovil (kathiresan kovil) hill. It was the venue for the 2021 11th Hockey India Junior Men's Championship Trophy (field hockey). In this Stadium, three National level hockey trophy matches were played: in 2019 11th All India Lakshmi Ammal hockey trophy men's team, 2021 11th Hockey India Junior Men's Championship Trophy, and 2022 12th Hockey India Junior Men's Championship Trophy. It is also the venue for all division matches of the Hockey Unit of Tamil Nadu and the home ground of the Kovilpatti team.

== Major National Tournament ==
- 2019

Year	Tournament
2019	11th All India Lakshmi Ammal Memorial Hockey tournament - Men's team

SDAT Astroturf Hockey Stadium
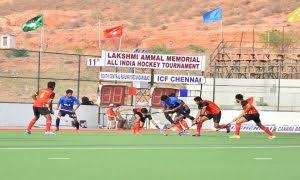
- 2019 hockey tournament at SDAT stadium Kovilpatti
Location

- 2021

Year	Tournament
2021	11th Hockey India Junior Men's Championship Hockey tournament - junior Men's team

SDAT Astroturf Hockey Stadium
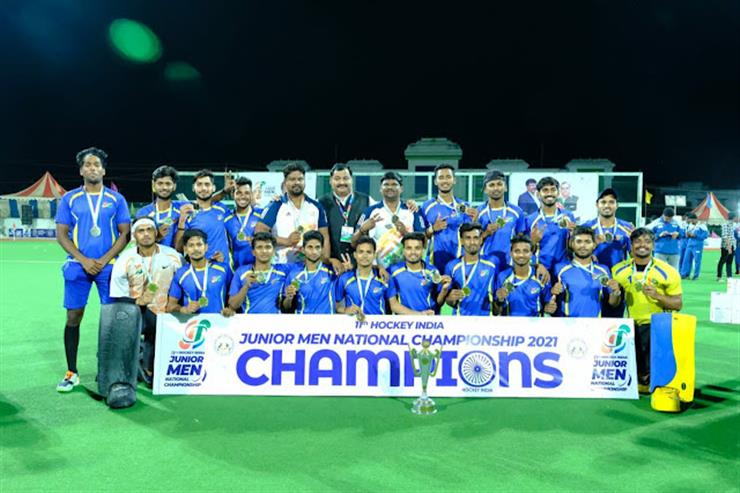
- 2021 hockey tournament at SDAT stadium Kovilpatti
Location

- 2022

Year	Tournament
2022	12th Hockey India Junior Men's Championship Hockey tournament - junior Men's team

SDAT Astroturf Hockey Stadium
Location

== Major domestic events ==
- 2017 Lakshmi Ammal domestic hockey tournament
- 2022, 17th Annual State Level Hockey Tournament (Philips Hockey Tournament- SDAT Astroturf Stadium, Kovilpatti 7/3/2022 to 11/3/2022)

SDAT Astroturf Hockey Stadium
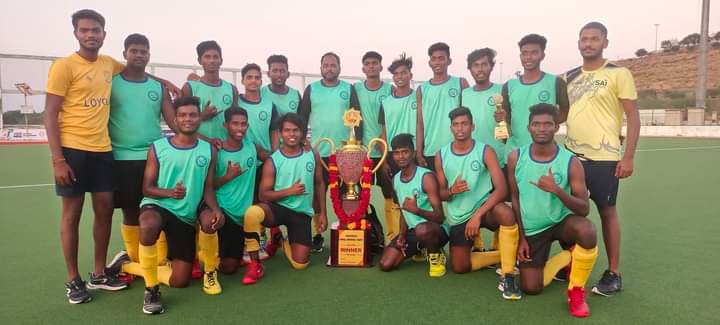
- 2022 Hockey tournament at SDAT stadium Kovilpatti
Location

== Title Winners ==
=== National Level Title Winners ===
Years.	Winners
2019	Bengaluru Hockey Association
2021	Uttarpradesh Hockey
2022	Uttarpradesh Hockey

=== Domestic inter state Level Title Winners ===
Years.	Winners
2022	Chennai TamilNadu Hockey Academy

== 11th Hockey India Junior ==
11th Hockey India Junior Men National Championship2021, at Kovilpatti, Tamil Nadu

- Totally 30 junior Men's team participated in the 11th Hockey India Junior Men's National Championship 2021

== 12th Hockey India Junior ==
12th Hockey India Junior Men National Championship2022, at Kovilpatti, Tamil Nadu

- 2022

17/May/2022 - 29/May/2022 Totally 30 junior Men's team participated in the 12th Hockey India Junior Men's National Championship 2022

=== Match Schedule ===
Pool	Team Names
Pool A	UTTAR PRADESH HOCKEY, TELANGANA HOCKEY, HOCKEY HIMACHAL.
Pool B	HOCKEY CHANDIGARH, HOCKEY BENGAL, HOCKEY MADHYA PRADESH.
Pool C	HOCKEY ASSOCIATION OF ODISHA, LE PUDUCHERRY HOCKEY, HOCKEY RAJASTHAN, DADRA & NAGAR HAVELI AND; DAMAN & DIU HOCKEY.
Pool D	HOCKEY HARYANA, MANIPUR HOCKEY, KERALA HOCKEY, TRIPURA HOCKEY.
Pool E	HOCKEY BIHAR, HOCKEY JAMMU & KASHMIR, ASSAM HOCKEY, HOCKEY ARUNACHAL.
Pool F	HOCKEY PUNJAB; HOCKEY MAHARASHTRA; HOCKEY ANDHRA PRADESH; HOCKEY MIZORAM
Pool G	HOCKEY UNIT OF TAMIL NADU, HOCKEY JHARKHAND, CHHATTISGARH HOCKEY, GOANS HOCKEY.
Pool H	DELHI HOCKEY, HOCKEY KARNATAKA, HOCKEY UTTARAKHAND, HOCKEY GUJARAT.

== Mountain view ==
Stadium is Located at the foot of the (Kathiresan malai murugan kovil) Hill and near tiger cave Kovilpatti

SDAT Astroturf Hockey Stadium
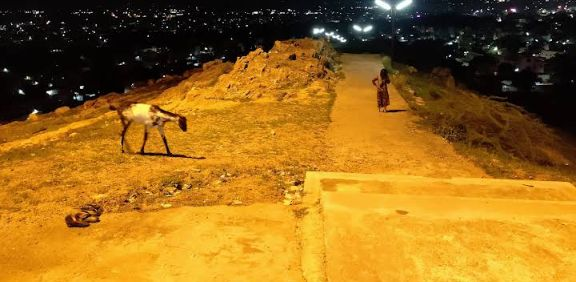
- from mountain view
Location
