= Gandhinagar Gymkhana =

Multi purpose stadium in Gandhinagar, Gujarat, India

- Full name: Gandhinagar Gymkhana
- Location: Gandhinagar, Gujarat
- Owner: Gandhinagar Gymkhana
- Operator: Gandhinagar Gymkhana
- Capacity: n/a

Construction
- Groundbreaking: 1978
- Opened: 1978

Website
- ESPNcricinfo

Gandhinagar Gymkhana is a multi purpose stadium in Gandhinagar, Gujarat. The ground is mainly used for organizing matches of football, cricket and other sports. The stadium has hosted a first-class matches in 1976 when Gujarat cricket team played against Baroda cricket team. The stadium has hosted non-first-class matches.
