= YS Raja Reddy Stadium =

Cricket stadium in Andhra Pradesh, India

YS Raja Reddy Cricket Stadium
- YS Raja Reddy Cricket Stadium
- Interactive map of YS Raja Reddy Cricket Stadium
- Full name: YS Raja Reddy Cricket Stadium
- Address: Kadapa
- Location: Kadapa, Andhra Pradesh
- Coordinates: 14°26′18.26″N 78°51′36.27″E
- Owner: Kadapa Municipal Corporation
- Operator: Andhra Cricket Association
- Capacity: 15,000

Construction
- Opened: 2011

Tenant
- Andhra cricket team

Website
- Cricinfo

YS Raja Reddy Cricket Stadium is a cricket stadium in Cuddapah, Andhra Pradesh. The stadium is located at Putlampalle, 10 km from the heart of Kadapa city. The stadium was built at a cost of Rs. 8 crores on an area of 10.50 acres of land and has a seating capacity of 15,000.

The ground has all facilities to host first-class matches and has an 85-yard boundary. YS Raja Reddy-Andhra Cricket Association stadium was initiative of former Chief Minister YS Rajasekhara Reddy, whose family is reported to have donated Rs.50 lakhs for the stadium. There is also a residential academy of Andhra Cricket Association with various facilities.

== See also ==
- cricketarchive
- espncricinfo
