= Guru Gobind Singh Stadium, Nanded =

Sports venue in Nanded, Maharashtra, India

Shri Guru Gobind Singh Stadium
- SGGS Stadium
- Interactive map of Shri Guru Gobind Singh Stadium
- Location: Nanded, Maharashtra
- Coordinates: 19°16′00″N 077°30′00″E
- Owner: Nanded-Waghala City Municipal Corporation, Nanded (NWCMC)
- Operator: N. W. C. M. C.
- Capacity: 30,000
- Surface: Grass
- Scoreboard: No
- Public transit: City Bus

Construction
- Built: R.C.C.
- Renovated: 2017
- Architect: Stadium Manager - Ramesh Choure

The Guru Gobind Singh Stadium is one of the main sports venues in Nanded, in the Indian state of Maharashtra. It is used mostly for cricket matches. The stadium is named after Guru Gobind Singh, the 10th Guru of Sikhs, who made Nanded his permanent abode and passed his Guruship to Guru Granth Sahib before his death in 1708.

== History ==
Two Ranji trophy matches were played here, one in 1980/81 between Maharashtra & Bombay (Now, Mumbai) and other in 1983/84 between Maharashtra & Saurashtra. Riaz Poonawala had scored 133 runs here against Saurashtra in the later match. The highest partnership was of 134 runs between GA Parkar & RD Parkar against Bombay in first match played here. Second highest was 102 runs partnership between Bombay players AV Mankad & ED Solkar, made in 1980/81 against Maharashtra. This stadium ground was also used for political rallies and other cultural programmes until 2014. A 400 Meter standard running track was built on ground prior to Cricket pitch.

== Development ==
Under state government sports policy, former India captain Dilip Vengsarkar visited here in 2014 for inspection and offered assistance regarding development plan for international standard Cricket ground. This stadium was undergoing renovation since then to have international standard Cricket pitch and 87-yard ground area. The ground has four main pitches with six more pitches for practice purpose. The entire ground has lush green outfield with advanced water sprinkle and drainage system installed. The funding for a renovation was assigned in 2018.

== Additional Facilities ==
SGGS stadium campus also hosts an indoor sports hall for Badminton and other sports events.

== How To Reach ==
Shri Guru Gobind Singh Airport to stadium distance is about 6 km and Hazur Sahib Nanded railway station (NED) is close than a kilometer distance. Nanded is also well connected to Mumbai, Pune, Nagpur, Hyderabad by road. City Bus and Hire Auto-Rickshaws available for local transit.
