= Jayanti Stadium =

Multi-purpose stadium in Bhilai, India

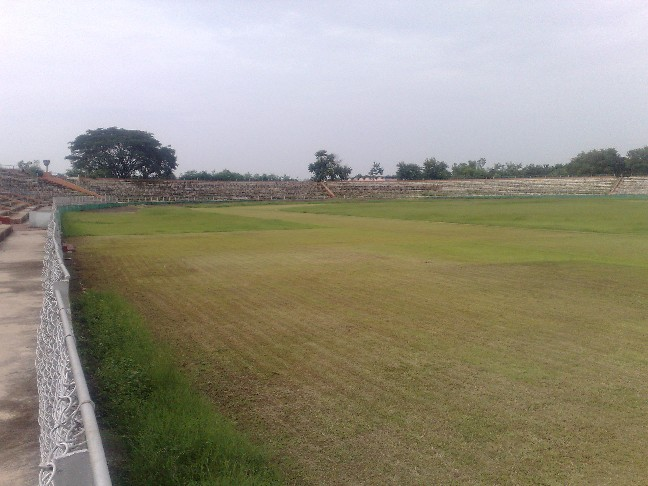
- View of Stands
- Interactive map of Jayanti Stadium
- Location: Bhilai, Durg, Chhattisgarh
- Country: India
- Coordinates: 21°10′45″N 81°20′40″E
- Home club: Chhattisgarh
- Owner: Bhilai Steel Plant, Bhilai, Durg, Chhattisgarh
- Operator: Steel Authority of India Limited

The Jayanti Stadium in Bhilai is a multi-purpose stadium at Indra Place in Bhilai, India. The 20,000-capacity stadium is used mostly for football and field hockey and also for athletics.

In cricket, Madhya Pradesh has used it as a home field.

Indian prime minister Narendra Modi spoke at the stadium in 2018.
