= International Cricket Stadium =

Cricket ground in Kota, Rajasthan, India

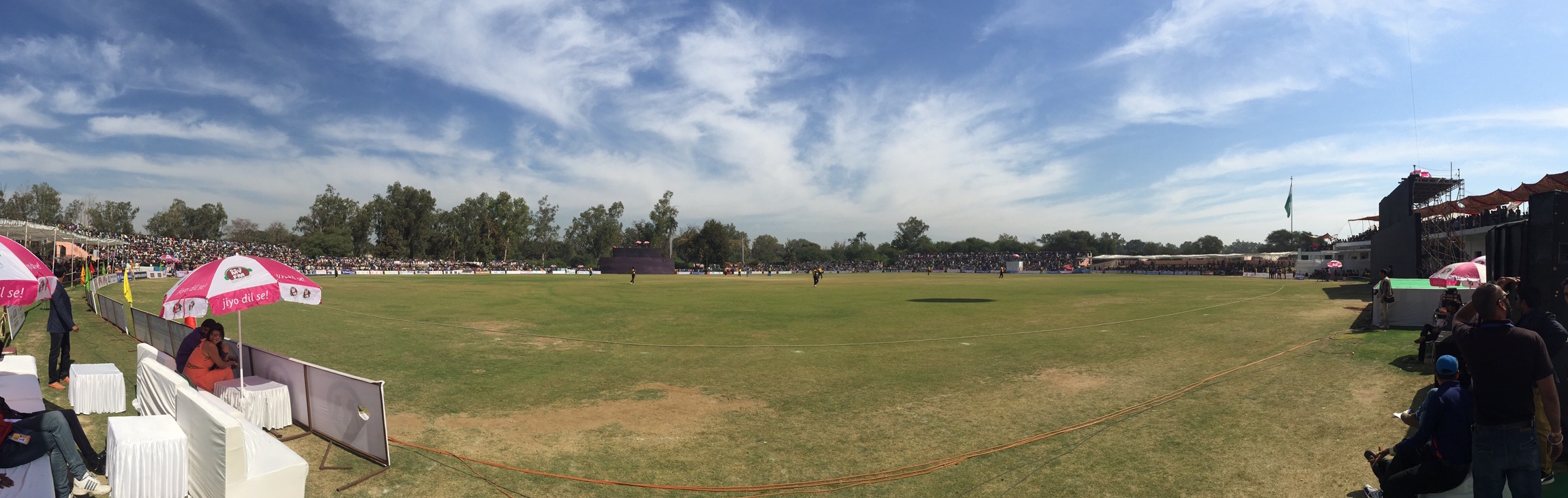
- Full name: International Cricket Stadium
- Former names: Jay Kaylon Ground; J K Pavilion
- Location: Kota, Rajasthan
- Capacity: 15,000

Construction
- Opened: 1974
- Renovated: 2006

Tenant
- Rajasthan cricket team

Website
- ESPNcricinfo

International Cricket Stadium or Jay Kaylon Ground is a cricket ground in Kota, Rajasthan. The ground as established in 1974 with name of Municipal Stadium. The ground regularly hosts Ranji matches for Rajasthan cricket team. Till date the ground has hosted six first-class matches and a List A match between Wills XI and Uttar Pradesh cricket team.

In 2006, Government of Rajasthan made and cleared the proposals to upgrade ground into international cricket venue in the city as sum a Rs 18.59 crore cleared for proposal which include built the pavilion and playing field to international standards.

The ground is set to play host to RCL T20 2016 from 16 February to 24 February with six teams from all across Rajasthan and 18 matches, in total.
