= Veer Surendra Sai Stadium =

Cricket stadium in Sambalpur, Odisha, India

Coordinates: 21.466525°N 83.986024°E

- Interactive map of Veer Surendra Sai Stadium
- Location: Sambalpur, Odisha
- Country: India
- Establishment: 1998
- Capacity: 20,000
- Owner: Odisha Cricket Association
- Operator: Odisha Cricket Association
- Tenants: Odisha cricket team Odisha women's cricket team Odisha football team Odisha women's football team

Veer Surendra Sai Stadium is a cricket stadium in Sambalpur, Odisha. The ground is named after Surendra Sai, an Indian freedom fighter who died fighting the British. The ground hosted cricket matches from 1973. Till date ground has hosted 15 first-class matches. The ground has hosted at least one match since 2008 for Odisha cricket team. The ground hosted two List A matches in 1992 and 1999 both for East Zone.
