= Goa Cricket Association Stadium =

Future cricket stadium

Goa Cricket Association Stadium (tentative)
- Interactive map of Goa Cricket Association Stadium (tentative)
- Location: Dhargal, Goa
- Coordinates: 15°31′26.4″N 73°49′48″E
- Owner: Goa Cricket Association
- Operator: Goa Cricket Association
- Capacity: 45,000 (cricket)
- Surface: Grass

Construction
- Groundbreaking: 2025
- Opened: 2029 (tentative)

Tenant
- Goa Cricket Association

Goa Cricket Association Stadium is a cricket stadium, proposed to be built in Dhargal, Goa. The stadium will be the home ground of the Goa Cricket Association. The project is currently suspended due to various problems, construction was obstructed by corruption and financial troubles. Goa is the only state association that does not own its own cricket stadium.

The ground will be established with an area of 1.30 lakh square metres, with all facilities like a practice stadium, indoor practice area etc. The ground will have floodlight so that stadium can host day-night matches with a seating capacity of 45,000 spectators.
