= Pandit Ravishankar Shukla Stadium =

Cricket ground in Durg, Chhattisgarh, India

Coordinates: 23.169°N 79.9273°E

Ravishankar Shukla Stadium
Ground information
- Location: Durg, Chhattisgarh
- Establishment: 1979
- Capacity: n/a
- End names
- n/a

Team information
Madhya Pradesh cricket team	(1979-1999)
Chhattisgarh cricket team	(2000-)
- As of 25 August 2015; Source

Ravishankar Shukla Stadium is a cricket ground in Durg, Chhattisgarh. The hosted its first match between Madhya Pradesh cricket team against Uttar Pradesh cricket team in 1979. After 20 year, the stadium hosted its first List-A match between Madhya Pradesh cricket team against Uttar Pradesh cricket team where Madhya Pradesh cricket team won 6 wickets. Devendra Bundela and Abbas Ali scored unbeaten 125 and 106 respectively. Then the stadium hosts its last match between Madhya Pradesh cricket team against Uttar Pradesh cricket team in 1999/00 Ranji Trophy and the match was drawn.
