= Northern Railway Cricket Ground, Jodhpur =

Multi purpose stadium in Jodhpur, Rajasthan, India

Northern Railway Cricket Ground
- Full name: Northern Railway Cricket Ground
- Location: Jodhpur, Rajasthan
- Owner: Northern Railway
- Operator: Northern Railway
- Capacity: 5,000

Construction
- Groundbreaking: 1969
- Opened: 1969

Tenant
- Jodhpur FC (association football)

Website
- ESPNcricinfo

Northern Railway Cricket Ground is a multi purpose stadium in Jodhpur, Rajasthan. The ground is mainly used for organizing matches of football, cricket and other sports. The stadium has hosted two Ranji Trophy match in 1970 when Rajasthan cricket team played against Vidarbha cricket team. The ground hosted one more Ranji Trophy matches in 1972 when Rajasthan cricket team played against Madhya Pradesh cricket team but since then the stadium has hosted non-first-class matches.
