= Sardar Vallabhbhai Patel International Hockey Stadium =

Field hockey stadium in Raipur, Chhattisgarh, India

Raipur International Hockey Stadium
- Hockey Stadium
- Full name: Sardar Vallabhbhai Patel International Hockey Stadium
- Location: Raipur, Chhattisgarh, India
- Owner: Government of Chhattisgarh
- Operator: Hockey India
- Capacity: 4,000

Construction
- Built: 2015
- Opened: 9 November 2015
- Cost: ₹18 crore (US$1.9 million)

Tenant
- India men's national field hockey team

Sardar Vallabhbhai Patel International Hockey Stadium or Raipur International Hockey Stadium is field hockey stadium located in Raipur, in the Indian state of Chhattisgarh. It is Chhattisgarh's second international blue astroturf hockey stadium after International Hockey Stadium in Rajnandgaon, which was dedicated to public in August 2014.

It is named after Vallabhbhai Patel, an Indian independence activist and statesman.

The stadium was constructed in record time, in a span of four months and at a cost of ₹18 crore (US$1.9 million), before it was inaugurated in November 2015. It hosted the 2014–15 Men's World League Final, in December 2015.

== History ==
The stadium was inaugurated on the 109th birth anniversary of the legendary hockey player Major Dhyan Chand and was inaugurated by the Speaker of Chhattisgarh Legislative Assembly Gaurishankar Agrawal and has a capacity of 4000 spectators with cost of Rs. 18 crores and statue of Sardar Patel was also inaugurated at entrance of the stadium.

The stadium saw its first match as an exhibition match played between India ‘A’ and India ‘B’ teams with 16 national players each from members of the Glasgow Commonwealth Games silver medal-winning Indian men's side.

The stadium hosted the 2014–15 Men's World League Final in December 2015.

The first match played at the stadium was between India men's national field hockey team and Australia men's national field hockey team on 19 November 2015. V. R. Raghunath put two goals in the 28th and 43rd minute to draw 2-2 the match.
