= Calicut Medical College Stadium =

Football stadium in Kozhikode, Kerala, India

CMC Stadium
- Interactive map of CMC Stadium
- Full name: Olympian Rahman Stadium, Calicut
- Former names: Medical College Ground
- Location: Calicut Medical College, Kozhikode
- Coordinates: 11.27998°N 75.83736°E
- Owner: Calicut Medical College
- Operator: Calicut Medical College; Kerala Football Association; Kerala Cricket Association
- Capacity: 15,000
- Surface: Grass

Construction
- Groundbreaking: 1991
- Built: 1991
- Opened: 2013 (Estimated)
- Cost: Rs.15 Crores
- General contractor: Gryphons India Constructions

Tenants
- Calicut Medical College; Kerala Blasters FC (B) (secondary ground); Kerala Football Association; Kerala State Cricket Team

Calicut Medical College Stadium (officially Olympian Rahman Stadium) is a football stadium in the city of Kozhikode in Kerala. Council Kozhikode District Sports Council and Kozhikode Corporation had constructed the stadium for 35th National Games. The stadium hosted football matches along with EMS Stadium.

== Location ==
Sports Complex is located in the campus of Government Medical College, Kozhikode which is about 10 kilometres (6.2 mi) east from the heart of Calicut city. The college is around 10 kilometres (6.2 mi) east of Calicut Railway station and around 30 kilometres (19 mi) from Calicut International Airport. The college is 5 kilometres (3.1 mi) from the NH 212 highway.

== Facilities ==
- Three storied new pavilion with the following facilities Change rooms and toilets for players
- Media work station
- Dope testing rooms
- VIP facilities
- Turfing with Mexican grass
- 400 metre synthetic track
- Internal drain, External drain and Peripheral drain

== Kerala Blasters FC (B) ==
The reserve squad of Kerala Blasters FC, the Kerala Blasters FC (B) use the stadium as their secondary home ground for Kerala Premier League and I-League 2nd Division matches.
