= Sukhadia Stadium =

Multi purpose stadium in Bhilwara, Rajasthan, India

Coordinates: 25°18′34″N 74°37′56″E

- Interactive map of Sukhadia Stadium
- Full name: Sukhadia Stadium
- Location: Bhilwara, Rajasthan
- Capacity: 16,000

Construction
- Groundbreaking: 1995
- Opened: 1995

Website
- Cricinfo

Sukhadia Stadium is a multi purpose stadium in Bhilwara, Rajasthan. The ground is mainly used for organizing matches of football, cricket and other sports. The stadium has capacity of 16,000 persons and City End, Airport End are two end of the stadium.

The stadium has hosted a Ranji Trophy match from 1964 when Central Zone cricket team played against West Zone cricket team.

The stadium has hosted a Deodhar Trophy match from 1964 when Central Zone cricket team played against West Zone cricket team until 1998 but since then the stadium has hosted non-first-class matches.
