= Bhupal Noble's College =

- Type: Public
- Established: 1923
- Academic affiliations: Mohanlal Sukhadia University
- Location: Udaipur, Rajasthan, India; 24.5805585°N 73.7185407°E
- Campus: Urban, 1 acre (4,000 m^{2})
- Website: http://www.fmsudaipur.org

Bhupal Noble's College (formerly Bhupal Noble's Institute) is a tertiary educational institution in Udaipur, Rajasthan, India. It was established in 1923 by Maharaj Kumar HH Bhupal Singh ji Bahadur Mewar.

At present it consists of nine colleges and caters to more than 9,000 students in a range of disciplines including Pharmacy, Physical Education, Law, Management, International Travel and Tourism Management, History, Indology, Nursing, General Science, Commerce, Arts, Drawing and Painting, Home Science, and Computer and Information Technology. Classes are offered in both Hindi and English.
