= Northern Railway Stadium =

Multi purpose stadium in Bikaner, Rajasthan, India

- Full name: Northern Railway Stadium
- Location: Bikaner, Rajasthan
- Owner: Northern Railway
- Operator: Northern Railway
- Capacity: 5,000

Construction
- Groundbreaking: 1976
- Opened: 1976

Website
- ESPNcricinfo

Northern Railway Stadium is a multi purpose stadium in Bikaner, Rajasthan. The ground is mainly used for organizing matches of football, cricket and other sports. The stadium has hosted five first-class matches in 1976 when Rajasthan cricket team played against Vidarbha cricket team. The ground hosted four more first-class matches from 1978 to 1995. The stadium also hosted two List A matches when Willis XI played against Madhya Pradesh cricket team and against Central Zone cricket team played against West Zone cricket team but since then the stadium has hosted non-first-class matches.
