= Railway Cricket Ground, Jaipur =

Multi purpose stadium in Jaipur, Rajasthan, India

Coordinates: 26°54′55″N 75°47′13″E

Railway Cricket Ground
- Interactive map of Railway Cricket Ground
- Full name: Railway Cricket Ground
- Location: Jaipur, Rajasthan
- Owner: Northern Railway
- Operator: Northern Railway
- Capacity: 5,000

Construction
- Groundbreaking: 1963
- Opened: 1963

Tenant
- Rajasthan United FC (association football)

Website
- Cricinfo

Railway Cricket Ground is a multi purpose stadium in Jaipur, Rajasthan. The ground is mainly used for organizing matches of football, cricket and other sports. The stadium has hosted nine Ranji Trophy matches from 1964 when Rajasthan cricket team played against Delhi cricket team until 1989 but since then the stadium has hosted non-first-class matches.
