= Dr Bhimrao Ambedkar International Cricket Stadium =

Sports stadium for students in India

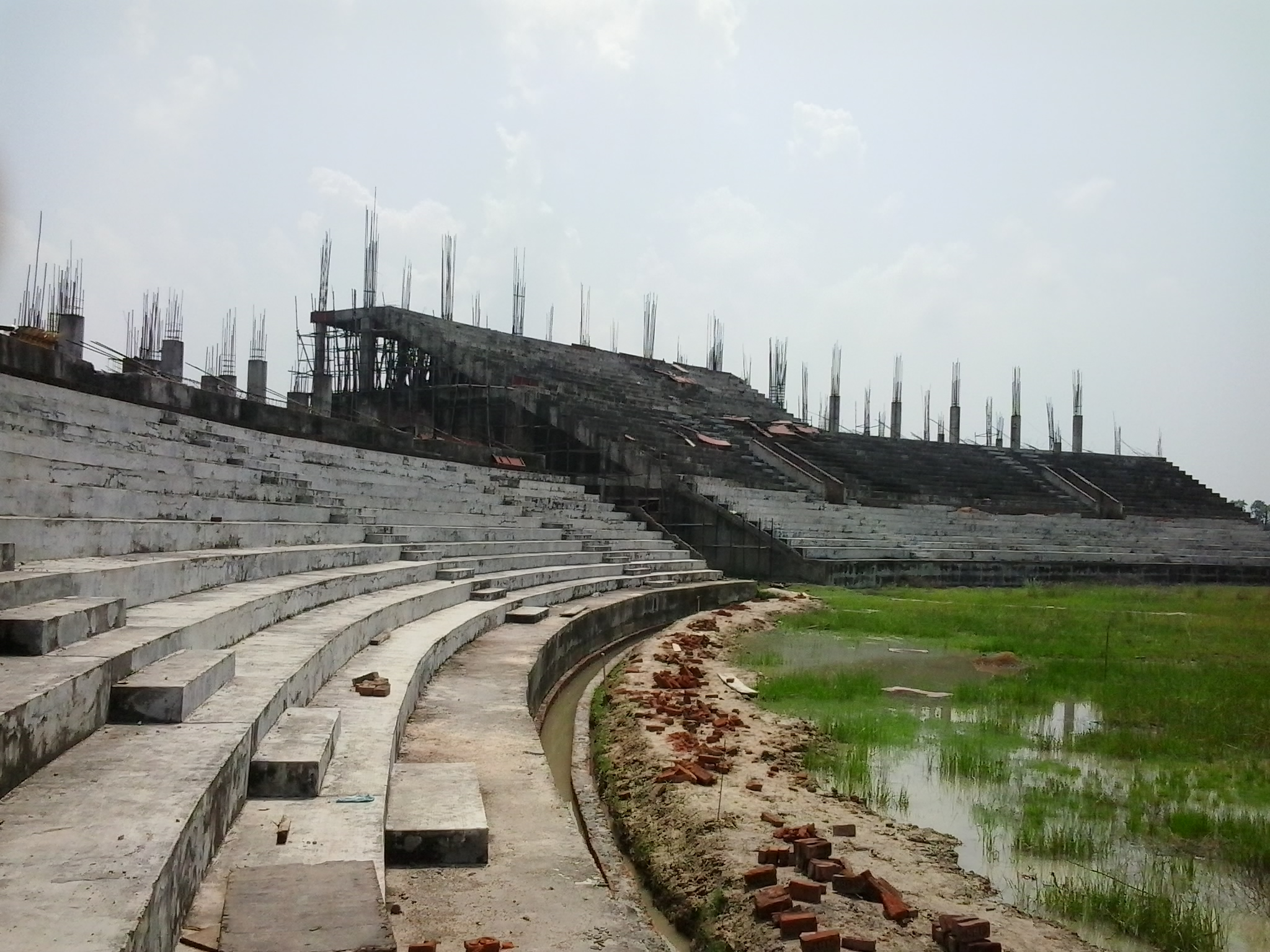
- The stadium under construction
- Interactive map of Dr Bhimrao Ambedkar International Cricket Stadium
- Location: Ayodhya district, Uttar Pradesh, India
- Coordinates: 26°43′49.0″N 82°08′17.5″E
- Owner: Government of Uttar Pradesh
- Capacity: 20,000

Construction
- Built: 2014
- Opened: 2019
- Renovated: 2020
- Cost: ₹16,767,878 (US$170,000)

Dr Bhimrao Ambedkar International Cricket Stadium, is a cricket stadium situated on the Ayodhya - Sultanpur road in Ayodhya district, Uttar Pradesh, India. The stadium is a part of a sports Dr Bhimrao Ambedkar International Sports Complex project.

The ground is an international standard sports ground being built near the junction of the NH- 330 and the Ayodhya ring-road, a few kilometres away from Ayodhya Airport.

== Controversies ==
The Lokayukta office has received a complaint from Bhanu Pratap Singh of Ayodhya - who has accused the minister of corruption in the construction the stadium. According to the complainant, the sports minister had a nexus with former sports director Hari Om and former project manager R.D. Prasad, and had deliberately delayed the construction of the ₹ 86 crore Dr Bhim Rao Ambedkar Stadium paving the way for an escalation of costs to ₹ 150 crore.
