= Dr. Akhilesh Das Gupta Stadium =

Multi-purpose stadium in Lucknow, India

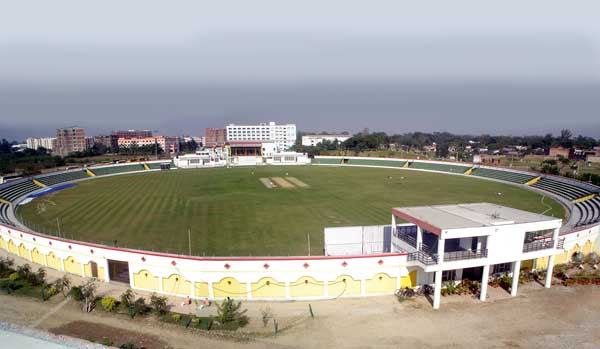
- Interactive map of Dr. Akhilesh Das Gupta Stadium

Ground information
- Location: Chinhat, Lucknow, Uttar Pradesh, India
- Coordinates: 26.883799°N 81.058481°E
- Establishment: 2007
- Capacity: 20,000
- Owner: Babu Banarasi Das University
- Operator: Babu Banarasi Das University
- Tenants: Uttar Pradesh cricket team

Team information
Uttar Pradesh cricket team	(2007–present)

Dr. Akhilesh Das Gupta Stadium is a multi-purpose stadium, used mostly for Cricket and Association football, situated in the campus of Babu Banarasi Das University, Lucknow.

== Capacity ==
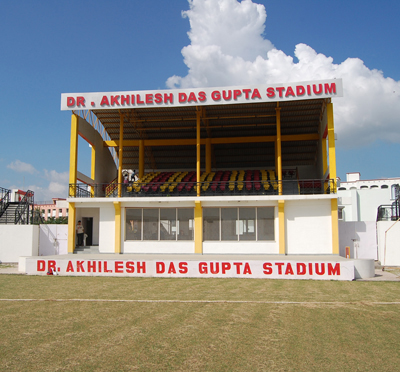
VIP Box of the stadium

The Stadium has a capacity to accommodate more than 20,000 spectators. The stadium is approved by BCCI to hold first-class level matches and is regularly used for Ranji Trophy matches every year.

== Matches hosted ==
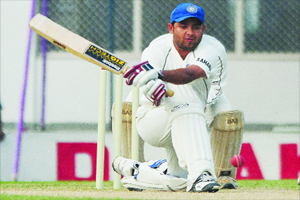
Piyush Chawla playing a reverse sweep during a Ranji Trophy match at the stadium

Following are the Ranji Trophy matches played at the stadium so far:

- Uttar Pradesh cricket team against Baroda cricket team in 2007/08
- Uttar Pradesh cricket team against Delhi cricket team in 2009/10
- Uttar Pradesh cricket team against Orissa cricket team in 2010/11
- Uttar Pradesh cricket team against Mumbai cricket team in 2011/12
- Uttar Pradesh cricket team against Haryana cricket team in 2012/13
- Uttar Pradesh cricket team against Railways cricket team in 2013/14
- Uttar Pradesh cricket team against Baroda cricket team in 2014/15

== IPL ==
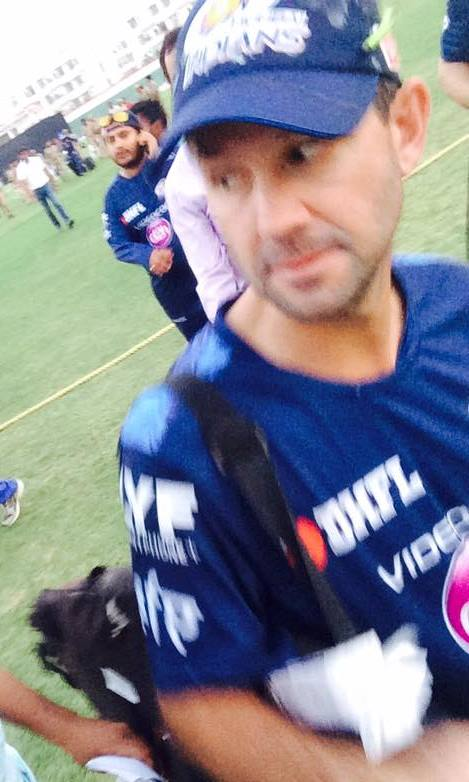
Former Australian Captain and Mumbai Indians Coach, Ricky Ponting at the stadium during net sessions

During 2016 Indian Premier League, Mumbai Indians used this stadium to hold practice sessions in preparation for their match against Gujarat Lions at Green Park Stadium.

== See also ==
- Akhilesh Das
- Uttar Pradesh cricket team
- Green Park Stadium
- Ranji Trophy
