= Indira Gandhi Stadium (Alwar) =

Multi-purpose stadium in Alwar, Rajasthan, India

Coordinates: 27.5453499°N 76.6091329°E

Ground information
- Location: Alwar, Rajasthan
- Country: India
- Establishment: 1993 (first recorded match)
- Capacity: 40,000
- End names
- n/a

Team information
Rajasthan	(1993-1995)
- As of 10 August 2015; Source: Ground profile

Indira Gandhi Stadium is a multi-purpose stadium used mostly for association football and field hockey and also for athletics in Alwar, Rajasthan, India. The ground first held a first-class match in December 1993 when Rajasthan played the Vidarbha in the 1993/94 Ranji Trophy. The ground has held 4 further first-class matches, the last of which came in the 1995/96 Ranji Trophy when South Zone and the West Zone.

In October 2012, over 6,000 youths mobbed into the stadium while taking part in Army recruitment drive which on the rampage for four hours.
