= Major Dhyan Chand Hockey Stadium, Jhansi =

Hockey ground in Jhansi, India

Coordinates: 25°27′10″N 78°33′31″E

Dhyanchand Stadium
- Interactive map of Dhyanchand Stadium
- Full name: Dhyanchand Stadium
- Location: Jhansi, Uttar Pradesh
- Owner: Government of Uttar Pradesh
- Operator: Indian Railways
- Capacity: 5,000

Construction
- Built: 1902
- Opened: 1902

Website
- Cricinfo

Major Dhyan Chand Hockey Stadium is a hockey ground in Jhansi, India. The stadium is mostly used for Hockey purposes and has got coaching facility. The stadium is named after Major Dhyan Chand who lived in Jhansi.

The stadium was a cricket stadium in past and had hosted two official cricket matches. The stadium was used by Railways cricket team. In 1903, the stadium hosted a cricket match when home side Bundelkhand cricket team played against Oxford University Authentics. The stadium hosted its one and only cricket match Railways cricket team played against Madhya Pradesh cricket team in 1984 since then the stadium is unused for cricket.
