= Barkatullah Khan Stadium =

International cricket stadium in Jodhpur, Rajasthan, India

Coordinates: 26°16′24″N 73°00′4″E

- Interactive map of Barkatullah Khan Stadium

Ground information
- Location: Jodhpur, Rajasthan
- Country: India
- Establishment: 1986
- Capacity: 30,000
- Owner: Rajasthan Cricket Association
- Architect: Uttam Chand Jain
- Operator: Jodhpur Development Authority
- Tenants: Rajasthan United FC; Rajasthan cricket team
- End names
- Cox Cutir End; Residency Road End

International information
- First men's ODI: 8 December, 2000: India v Zimbabwe
- Last men's ODI: 21 November, 2002: India v West Indies
- As of 20 June 2014; Source: Barkatullah Khan Stadium, ESPNcricinfo

Barkatullah Khan Stadium is located in Jodhpur, Rajasthan. Named for the 6th chief minister of Rajasthan, the stadium is currently used mostly for cricket.

The stadium was established in 1986 but has been used only sporadically. The stadium's current capacity is 30,000 people and the ends are called Cox Cutir End and Residency Road End. It became India's 35th ground to host a one-dayer, while Jodhpur became India's 31st venue to host an ODI.

Now this ground has flood lights fitted by GE electric and capacity is enhanced up to 30,000 after seats were installed and newly developed team dressing rooms, also new stands for camera to set best live coverage.

In 2020, It was announced by RCA President for redevelopment of the stadium for upcoming IPL 2021 and for international matches. In 2021 Rajasthan Budget, Rs.20 Crore were allocated for redevelopment of the stadium by Chief Minister Of Rajasthan Ashok Gehlot.

Cricket returned after nearly 20 years in Jodhpur with Legends League Cricket 2022. The last time a match was played between India and West Indies at this ground was on 21 November 2002.

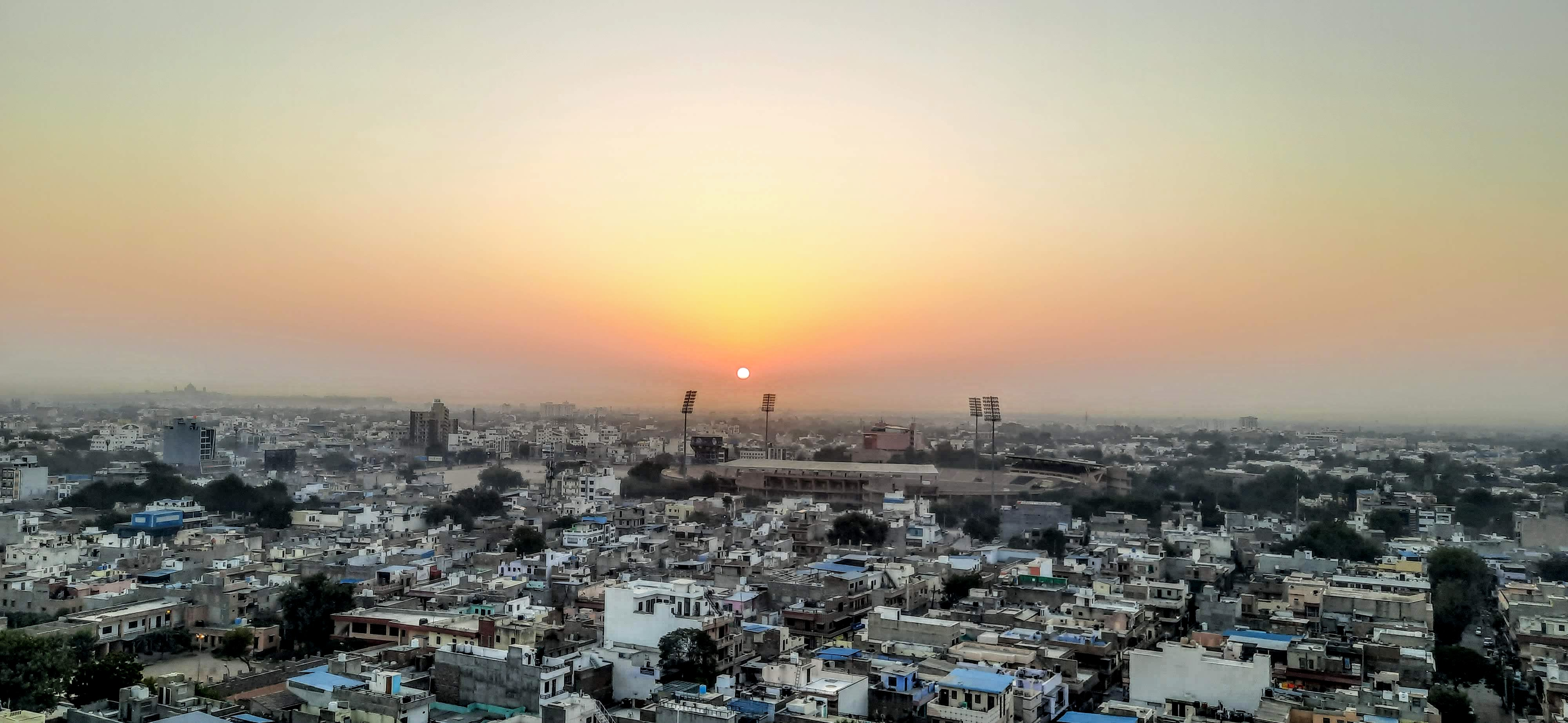
Sunrise view of Barkatullah Khan Stadium of Jodhpur

== List of international matches ==
=== ODI ===
Date	Tournament	Team 1	Team 2	Winner	Margin	Full Scorecard
Friday, 8 December 2000	Bilateral Series	India	Zimbabwe	(Zimbabwe)	1 wicket	Scorecard
Thursday, 21 November 2002	Bilateral Series	India	West Indies	(India)	3 wickets	Scorecard

=== T20 ===
Date	Tournament	Team 1	Team 2	Winner	Margin	Full Scorecard
Friday, 30 September 2022	Legends League Cricket 2022	Gujarat Giants	Bhilwara Kings	Bhilwara Kings	5 wickets	Scorecard
Saturday, 1 October 2022	Legends League Cricket 2022	India Capitals	Manipal Tigers	Manipal Tigers	3 wickets	Scorecard
Sunday, 2 October 2022	Legends League Cricket 2022	Bhilwara Kings	India Capitals	India Capitals	4 wickets	Scorecard
Monday, 3 October 2022	Legends League Cricket 2022	Gujarat Giants	Bhilwara Kings	Bhilwara Kings	6 wickets	Scorecard

== Records and trivia ==
Category	Information
Highest Team Score	Zimbabwe (284/9 in 49.5 Overs against India)
Lowest Team Score	West Indies (259/7 in 50 Overs against India)
Best Batting Performance	Sachin Tendulkar (146 Runs against Zimbabwe)
Best Bowling Performance	Ajit Agarkar (3/24 against West Indies)

Sachin Tendulkar slammed first century with 146 against Zimbabwe on home soil in the third one-dayer. It was also his highest score against the African nation.

Zaheer Khan made the Indian record of scoring most runs in a single over in one-dayers at this venue. The 50th over of Indian innings bowled by Henry Olonga cost 27 runs with 25 coming off Zaheer's bat. Ajit Agarkar grabbed his 100th wicket in his 67th match and became only the seventh Indian to do so.

=== One Day Internationals ===
No.	Score	Player	Team	Balls	Inns.	Opposing team	Date	Result
1	146	Sachin Tendulkar	India	153	1	Zimbabwe	8 December 2000	Lost
