= 2017–18 Vijay Hazare Trophy Group B =

Cricket tournament

- Dates: 5 – 17 February 2018
- Administrator(s): BCCI
- Cricket format: List A cricket
- Tournament format(s): Round-robin and Playoff format
- Host(s): Himachal Pradesh Cricket Association
- Participants: 7
- Matches: 21

The 2017–18 Vijay Hazare Trophy was the 16th season of the Vijay Hazare Trophy, a List A cricket tournament in India. It was contested by the 28 domestic cricket teams of India. The following seven teams were drawn in Group B: Bengal, Delhi, Himachal Pradesh, Kerala, Maharashtra, Tripura and Uttar Pradesh. In December 2017, the fixtures were brought forward to allow players to practice ahead of the 2018 Indian Premier League.

== Points table ==
Pos	Team	Pld	W	L	T	NR	Pts	NRR
1	Maharashtra	6	4	1	0	1	18	0.878
2	Delhi	6	4	2	0	0	16	0.727
3	Kerala	6	3	2	1	0	14	0.288
4	Himachal Pradesh	6	3	2	0	1	14	−0.108
5	Uttar Pradesh	6	3	3	0	0	12	−0.563
6	Bengal	6	2	3	1	0	10	0.007
7	Tripura	6	0	6	0	0	0	−1.127

- Top two teams advanced to the knockout stage

== Fixtures ==
=== Round 1 ===
5 February 2018
Scorecard

Bengal; 293/9 (50 overs)	v	Maharashtra; 294/3 (45.5 overs)
Abhimanyu Easwaran 103 (114); Anupam Sanklecha 2/39 (8 overs)		Rahul Tripathi 125* (102); Sayan Ghosh 1/36 (7 overs)

Maharashtra won by 7 wickets
Atal Bihari Vajpayee Stadium, Nadaun
Umpires: Saiyed Khalid and Nand Kishore

- Maharashtra won the toss and elected to field.
- Writtick Chatterjee (Bengal) made his List A debut.

5 February 2018
Scorecard

Delhi; 307/6 (50 overs)	v	Uttar Pradesh; 252 (45.3 overs)
Unmukt Chand 116 (125); Kartik Tyagi 2/50 (9 overs)		Umang Sharma 102 (104); Kulwant Khejroliya 4/34 (8.3 overs)

Delhi won by 55 runs
Luhnu Cricket Ground, Bilaspur
Umpires: Anil Dandekar and Rohan Pandit

- Uttar Pradesh won the toss and elected to field.
- Hiten Dalal (Delhi), Mohammad Saif, Kartik Tyagi and Upendra Yadav (Uttar Pradesh) all made their List A debuts.

5 February 2018
Scorecard

Tripura; 229/9 (50 overs)	v	Himachal Pradesh; 230/4 (45.2 overs)
Yashpal Singh 113* (127); Vinay Galetiya 3/21 (10 overs)		Amit Kumar 101* (124); Saurabh Das 2/49 (9.2 overs)

Himachal Pradesh won by 6 wickets
Himachal Pradesh Cricket Association Stadium, Dharamsala
Umpires: Nikhil Patwardhan and Tapan Sharma

- Himachal Pradesh won the toss and elected to field.
- Ayush Jamwal, Vinay Galetiya (Himachal Pradesh), Rajat Dey and Abhijit Chakraborty (Tripura) all made their List A debuts.

=== Round 2 ===
7 February 2018
Scorecard

Kerala; 235/6 (50 overs)	v	Bengal; 235/8 (50 overs)
Jalaj Saxena 100 (133); Manoj Tiwary 2/23 (4 overs)		Manoj Tiwary 73* (92); Sandeep Warrier 2/38 (10 overs)

Match tied
Atal Bihari Vajpayee Stadium, Nadaun
Umpires: Anil Dandekar and Rohan Pandit

- Kerala won the toss and elected to bat.
- Sumanta Gupta (Bengal), KC Akshay and Sudhesan Midhun (Kerala) all made their List A debuts.

7 February 2018
Scorecard

Tripura; 298/7 (50 overs)	v	Delhi; 300/3 (39.1 overs)
Bishal Ghosh 84 (118); Kulwant Khejroliya 2/51 (9 overs)		Nitish Rana 94* (60); Udiyan Bose 2/40 (3.1 overs)

Delhi won by 7 wickets
Himachal Pradesh Cricket Association Stadium, Dharamsala
Umpires: Nikhil Patwardhan and Tapan Sharma

- Delhi won the toss and elected to field.
- Kshitiz Sharma (Delhi) and Shyam Gan (Tripura) both made their List A debuts.

7 February 2018
Scorecard

Maharashtra; 343/5 (50 overs)	v	Uttar Pradesh; 238 (44.3 overs)
Ankit Bawne 117* (106); Saurabh Kumar 2/51 (10 overs)		Mohammad Saif 49 (50); Shamshuzama Kazi 3/38 (10 overs)

Maharashtra won by 105 runs
Luhnu Cricket Ground, Bilaspur
Umpires: Saiyed Khalid and Nand Kishore

- Uttar Pradesh won the toss and elected to field.
- Mohsin Khan (Uttar Pradesh) made his List A debut.

=== Round 3 ===
9 February 2018
Scorecard

Uttar Pradesh; 329/4 (50 overs)	v	Bengal; 322 (49.4 overs)
Akshdeep Nath 103* (72); Aamir Gani 2/59 (10 overs)		Vivek Singh 147 (125); Ankit Rajpoot 3/51 (9.4 overs)

Uttar Pradesh won by 7 runs
Lohnu Cricket Ground, Bilaspur
Umpires: Saiyed Khalid and Nand Kishore

- Bengal won the toss and elected to field.

9 February 2018
Scorecard

Maharashtra; 246 (50 overs)	v	Delhi; 250/2 (44.1 overs)
Shamshuzama Kazi 59 (62); Pradeep Sangwan 5/41 (9 overs)		Dhruv Shorey 103* (121); Anupam Sanklecha 1/44 (9 overs)

Delhi won by 8 wickets
Himachal Pradesh Cricket Association Stadium, Dharamsala
Umpires: Nikhil Patwardhan and Tapan Sharma

- Delhi won the toss and elected to field.

9 February 2018
Scorecard

Kerala; 271/7 (50 overs)	v	Himachal Pradesh; 273/9 (50 overs)
Sachin Baby 95 (81); Pankaj Jaswal 3/51 (9 overs)		Ankit Kaushik 83* (77); KC Akshay 4/32 (10 overs)

Himachal Pradesh won by 1 wicket
Atal Bihari Vajpayee Stadium, Nadaun
Umpires: Anil Dandekar and Rohan Pandit

- Himachal Pradesh won the toss and elected to field.
- KM Asif (Kerala) made his List A debut.

=== Round 4 ===
11 February 2018
Scorecard

Delhi; 282/8 (50 overs)	v	Bengal; 193 (41 overs)
Unmukt Chand 90 (114); Boddupalli Amit 4/52 (10 overs)		Abhimanyu Easwaran 67 (89); Kulwant Khejroliya 3/30 (6 overs)

Delhi won by 89 runs
Atal Bihari Vajpayee Stadium, Nadaun
Umpires: Saiyed Khalid and Nand Kishore

- Delhi won the toss and elected to bat.

11 February 2018
Scorecard

Uttar Pradesh; 189 (42.1 overs)	v	Himachal Pradesh; 146 (42.3 overs)
Saurabh Kumar 44 (38); Ayush Jamwal 4/23 (6.1 overs)		Nikhil Gangta 39 (69); Kartik Tyagi 3/29 (8 overs)

Uttar Pradesh won by 43 runs
Lohnu Cricket Ground, Bilaspur
Umpires: Anil Dandekar and Rohan Pandit

- Himachal Pradesh won the toss and elected to field.
- Aryan Juyal (Uttar Pradesh) made his List A debut.

11 February 2018
Scorecard

Tripura; 231/9 (50 overs)	v	Kerala; 234/6 (45.1 overs)
Manisankar Murasingh 61 (54); M. D. Nidheesh 3/29 (10 overs)		Rohan Prem 52 (66); Neelambuj Vats 3/49 (9.1 overs)

Kerala won by 4 wickets
Himachal Pradesh Cricket Association Stadium, Dharamsala
Umpires: Nikhil Patwardhan and Tapan Sharma

- Kerala won the toss and elected to field.
- M. D. Nidheesh (Kerala) and Neelambuj Vats (Tripura) both made their List A debuts.

=== Round 5 ===
13 February 2018
Scorecard

Bengal; 249 (33 overs)	v	Tripura; 140 (29 overs)
Vivek Singh 84 (71); Abhijit Chakraborty 7/40 (7 overs)		Joydeep Banik 51 (72); Pratap Singh 4/36 (6 overs)

Bengal won by 109 runs
Atal Bihari Vajpayee Stadium, Nadaun
Umpires: Anil Dandekar and Rohan Pandit

- Tripura won the toss and elected to field.
- Pratap Singh (Bengal) made his List A debut.

13 February 2018
Scorecard

Delhi; 177 (39.3 overs)	v	Kerala; 178/8 (35.4 overs)
Dhruv Shorey 71 (90); MD Nidheesh 4/41 (8.3 overs)		Sachin Baby 52 (57); Navdeep Saini 4/39 (8 overs)

Kerala won by 2 wickets
Himachal Pradesh Cricket Association Stadium, Dharamsala
Umpires: Nikhil Patwardhan and Tapan Sharma

- Kerala won the toss and elected to field.
- Fazil Fanoos (Kerala) made his List A debut.

13 February 2018
Scorecard

Himachal Pradesh	v	Maharashtra

Match abandoned
Lohnu Cricket Ground, Bilaspur
Umpires: Saiyed Khalid and Nand Kishore

- No toss.

=== Round 6 ===
15 February 2018
Scorecard

Himachal Pradesh; 304/5 (50 overs)	v	Delhi; 302 (49.4 overs)
Prashant Chopra 150 (149); Ishant Sharma 2/39 (10 overs)		Rishabh Pant 135 (93); Rishi Dhawan 3/38 (10 overs)

Himachal Pradesh won by 2 runs
Atal Bihari Vajpayee Stadium, Nadaun
Umpires: Nand Kishore and Saiyed Khalid

- Himachal Pradesh won the toss and elected to bat.
- Lalit Yadav (Delhi) and Priyanshu Khanduri (Himachal Pradesh) both made their List A debuts.

15 February 2018
Scorecard

Kerala; 261/9 (50 overs)	v	Uttar Pradesh; 141 (39.2 overs)
Rohan Prem 66* (95); Mohsin Khan 4/43 (10 overs)		Mohammad Saif 31 (66); KC Akshay 3/32 (10 overs)

Kerala won by 120 runs
Himachal Pradesh Cricket Association Stadium, Dharamsala
Umpires: Anil Dandekar and Rohan Pandit

- Uttar Pradesh won the toss and elected to field.

15 February 2018
Scorecard

Tripura; 222/7 (42 overs)	v	Maharashtra; 223/6 (41.1 overs)
Manisankar Murasingh 55 (49); Satyajeet Bachhav 2/17 (7 overs)		Ruturaj Gaikwad 115 (105); Abhijit Sarkar 2/40 (9 overs)

Maharashtra won by 4 wickets
Luhnu Cricket Ground, Bilaspur
Umpires: Nikhil Patwardhan and Tapan Sharma

- Tripura won the toss and elected to bat.
- Divyang Hinganekar (Maharashtra) made his List A debut.

=== Round 7 ===
17 February 2018
Scorecard

Himachal Pradesh; 266/8 (50 overs)	v	Bengal; 268/4 (48 overs)
Priyanshu Khanduri 74 (106); Pratap Singh 4/53 (9 overs)		Manoj Tiwary 104* (107); Ayush Jamwal 2/50 (10 overs)

Bengal won by 6 wickets
Himachal Pradesh Cricket Association Stadium, Himachal Pradesh
Umpires: Anil Dandekar and Rohan Pandit

- Himachal Pradesh won the toss and elected to bat.

17 February 2018
Scorecard

Maharashtra; 273/8 (37 overs)	v	Kerala; 175 (29.2 overs)
Naushad Shaikh 76 (56); Abhishek Mohan 2/54 (7 overs)		Sanju Samson 46 (48); Shrikant Mundhe 5/26 (5.2 overs)

Maharashtra won by 98 runs
Atal Bihari Vajpayee Stadium, Nadaun
Umpires: Nikhil Patwardhan and Tapan Sharma

- Kerala won the toss and elected to field.
- Murtaza Trunkwala (Maharashtra) made his List A debut.

17 February 2018
Scorecard

Uttar Pradesh; 357/8 (50 overs)	v	Tripura; 296/9 (50 overs)
Rinku Singh 91* (44); Saurabh Das 2/44 (7 overs)		Yashpal Singh 110 (104); Saurabh Kumar 3/52 (10 overs)

Uttar Pradesh won by 61 runs
Luhnu Cricket Ground, Bilaspur
Umpires: Saiyed Khalid and Nand Kishore

- Uttar Pradesh won the toss and elected to bat.
- Shubham Agarwal and Shanu Saini (Uttar Pradesh) both made their List A debuts.
