= 2017–18 Vijay Hazare Trophy Group D =

Cricket tournament

- Dates: 5 – 14 February 2018
- Administrator: BCCI
- Cricket format: List A cricket
- Tournament format(s): Round-robin and Playoff format
- Participants: 7
- Matches: 21

The 2017–18 Vijay Hazare Trophy was the 16th season of the Vijay Hazare Trophy, a List A cricket tournament in India. It was contested by the 28 domestic cricket teams of India. The following seven teams were drawn in Group D: Chhattisgarh, Hyderabad, Jammu & Kashmir, Jharkhand, Saurashtra, Services and Vidarbha. In December 2017, the fixtures were brought forward to allow players to practice ahead of the 2018 Indian Premier League.

== Points table ==
Pos	Team	Pld	W	L	T	NR	Pts	NRR
1	Hyderabad	6	5	1	0	0	20	0.646
2	Saurashtra	6	4	2	0	0	16	1.017
3	Vidarbha	6	4	2	0	0	16	0.718
4	Chhattisgarh	6	4	2	0	0	16	−0.103
5	Jharkhand	6	2	4	0	0	8	0.325
6	Jammu & Kashmir	6	2	4	0	0	8	−1.040
7	Services	6	0	6	0	0	0	−1.508

- Top two teams advanced to the knockout stage

== Fixtures ==
=== Round 1 ===
5 February 2018
Scorecard

Saurashtra; 286/7 (50 overs)	v	Chhattisgarh; 254/9 (50 overs)
Sheldon Jackson 106 (107); Pankaj Rao 2/46 (10 overs)		Manoj Singh 58 (74); Dharmendrasinh Jadeja 4/41 (10 overs)

Saurashtra won by 32 runs
Gymkhana Ground, Secunderabad
Umpires: Jayaraman Madanagopal and Sadashiv Iyer

- Chhattisgarh won the toss and elected to field.
- Sanidhya Hurkat, Shahnawaz Hussain, Shashank Chandrakar, Sahban Khan, Shivendra Singh, Vishal Kushwah and Rohit Dhruv (Chhattisgarh) all made their List A debuts.

5 February 2018
Scorecard

Hyderabad; 329/5 (50 overs)	v	Services; 201 (40.4 overs)
Akshath Reddy 127 (116); Raushan Raj 2/57 (10 overs)		Rahul Singh 64 (92); Mohammed Siraj 5/45 (9.4 overs)

Hyderabad won by 128 runs
Rajiv Gandhi International Stadium, Hyderabad
Umpires: Sudhir Asnani and Subrat Das

- Services won the toss and elected to field.
- Rohit Rayudu, Chaitanya Reddy, Ravi Teja (Hyderabad), Lakhan Singh, Nakul Sharma, Hardik Sethi, Vikas Yadav and Sagar Sharma (Services) all made their List A debuts.

5 February 2018
Scorecard

Vidarbha; 300 (49 overs)	v	Jharkhand; 293/7 (50 overs)
Jitesh Sharma 79 (83); Rahul Shukla 4/52 (9 overs)		Saurabh Tiwary 65 (77); Yash Thakur 2/45 (10 overs)

Vidarbha won by 7 runs
AOC Centre Thapar Stadium, Secunderabad
Umpires: Amiesh Saheba and R. Sundar

- Vidarbha won the toss and elected to bat.
- Nazim Siddiqui, Atul Singh Surwar, Sumit Kumar (Jharkhand) and Sanjay Raghunath (Vidarbha) all made their List A debuts.

=== Round 2 ===
6 February 2018
Scorecard

Services; 225 (44.5 overs)	v	Chhattisgarh; 221/6 (48.4 overs)
Rahul Singh 91 (79); Shahnawaz Hussain 6/44 (9.5 overs)		Shashank Chandrakar 70 (84); Arun Bamal 2/26 (10 overs)

Chhattisgarh won by 4 wickets
Gymkhana Ground, Secunderabad
Umpires: Subrat Das and R. Sundar

- Services won the toss and elected to bat.
- Arun Bamal (Services) made his List A debut.

6 February 2018
Scorecard

Hyderabad; 333/7 (50 overs)	v	Jharkhand; 267 (46.5 overs)
Rohit Rayudu 126 (135); Rahul Shukla 2/69 (9 overs)		Atul Singh Surwar 58* (57); Ravi Kiran 2/41 (7.5 overs)

Hyderabad won by 66 runs
Rajiv Gandhi International Stadium, Hyderabad
Umpires: Sudhir Asnani and Amiesh Saheba

- Jharkhand won the toss and elected to field.

6 February 2018
Scorecard

Vidarbha; 245 (48.2 overs)	v	Jammu & Kashmir; 172 (38.4 overs)
Ganesh Satish 94 (91); Umar Nazir 3/41 (8 overs)		Ram Dayal 55 (80); Shrikant Wagh 3/26 (8 overs)

Vidarbha won by 73 runs
AOC Centre Thapar Stadium, Secunderabad
Umpires: Jayaraman Madanagopal and Sadashiv Iyer

- Jammu & Kashmir won the toss and elected to field.
- Ishtiaq Elahi and Umar Nissar (Jammu & Kashmir) both made their List A debuts.

=== Round 3 ===
8 February 2018
Scorecard

Vidarbha; 350/6 (50 overs)	v	Hyderabad; 113 (34.2 overs)
Faiz Fazal 103 (97); Ravi Teja 2/53 (10 overs)		Kolla Sumanth 30 (47); Karn Sharma 3/38 (10 overs)

Vidarbha won by 237 runs
Rajiv Gandhi International Stadium, Hyderabad
Umpires: Amiesh Saheba and Subroto Das

- Vidarbha won the toss and elected to bat.

8 February 2018
Scorecard

Saurashtra; 267/6 (50 overs)	v	Jammu & Kashmir; 269/4 (49 overs)
Arpit Vasavada 85* (73); Waseem Raza 2/45 (10 overs)		Parvez Rasool 67* (80); Kamlesh Makvana 3/16 (10 overs)

Jammu & Kashmir won by 6 wickets
Gymkhana Ground, Secunderabad
Umpires: Jayaraman Madanagopal and Sadashiv Iyer

- Jammu & Kashmir won the toss and elected to field.
- Jatin Wadhwan and Shubham Pundir (Jammu & Kashmir) both made their List A debuts.

8 February 2018
Scorecard

Services; 202/9 (50 overs)	v	Jharkhand; 203/5 (30.5 overs)
Hardik Sethi 66 (78); Varun Aaron 3/20 (7 overs)		Ishan Kishan 106 (75); Vikas Yadav 2/23 (4 overs)

Jharkhand won by 5 wickets
AOC Centre Thapar Stadium, Secunderabad
Umpires: Sudhir Asnani and R. Sundar

- Jharkhand won the toss and elected to field.
- Anukul Roy (Jharkhand) and Trivendra Kumar (Services) both made their List A debuts.

=== Round 4 ===
9 February 2018
Scorecard

Chhattisgarh; 251/8 (50 overs)	v	Jammu & Kashmir; 246 (49.3 overs)
Shashank Chandrakar 59 (67); Ram Dayal 3/35 (10 overs)		Ahmed Bandy 75 (102); Pankaj Rao 3/44 (10 overs)

Chhattisgarh won by 5 runs
AOC Centre Thapar Stadium, Secunderabad
Umpires: Jayaraman Madanagopal and Amiesh Saheba

- Chhattisgarh won the toss and elected to bat.

9 February 2018
Scorecard

Saurashtra; 277/7 (50 overs)	v	Hyderabad; 278/6 (49.3 overs)
Prerak Mankad 62 (63); Mohammed Siraj 3/46 (10 overs)		Akshath Reddy 94 (96); Shaurya Sanandia 2/41 (7.3 overs)

Hyderabad won by 4 wickets
Rajiv Gandhi International Stadium, Hyderabad
Umpires: Sudhir Asnani and Subrat Das

- Saurashtra won the toss and elected to bat.
- Palakodeti Sairam (Hyderabad) made his List A debut.

9 February 2018
Scorecard

Vidarbha; 267/9 (50 overs)	v	Services; 250/9 (50 overs)
Apoorv Wankhade 73 (77); Raushan Raj 3/49 (9 overs)		Diwesh Pathania 100* (77); Rajneesh Gurbani 2/47 (10 overs)

Vidarbha won by 17 runs
Gymkhana Ground, Secunderabad
Umpires: Sadashiv Iyer and R. Sundar

- Vidarbha won the toss and elected to bat.

=== Round 5 ===
11 February 2018
Scorecard

Chhattisgarh; 284/8 (50 overs)	v	Vidarbha; 239 (46.1 overs)
Amandeep Khare 65 (57); Shrikant Wagh 3/58 (10 overs)		Akshay Karnewar 60 (64); Vishal Kushwah 4/54 (9 overs)

Chhattisgarh won by 45 runs
Rajiv Gandhi International Stadium, Hyderabad
Umpires: Subrat Das and Amiesh Saheba

- Chhattisgarh won the toss and elected to bat.

11 February 2018
Scorecard

Services; 296/6 (50 overs)	v	Jammu & Kashmir; 297/5 (49 overs)
Nakul Verma 125 (151); Abhishek Bhat 2/66 (9 overs)		Shubham Khajuria 102 (136); Arun Bamal 2/44 (9 overs)

Jammu & Kashmir won by 5 wickets
AOC Centre Thapar Stadium, Secunderabad
Umpires: Jayaraman Madanagopal and R. Sundar

- Services won the toss and elected to bat.
- Fazil Rashid (Jammu & Kashmir) made his List A debut.

11 February 2018
Scorecard

Jharkhand; 329/9 (50 overs)	v	Saurashtra; 333/6 (48.2 overs)
Ishan Kishan 93 (96); Shaurya Sanandia 2/59 (10 overs); Chirag Jani 2/59 (10 overs)		Ravindra Jadeja 113* (116); Ashish Kumar 2/64 (10 overs)

Saurashtra won by 4 wickets
Gymkhana Ground, Secunderabad
Umpires: Sudhir Asnani and Sadashiv Iyer

- Saurashtra won the toss and elected to field.
- Utkarsh Singh and Ashish Kumar (Jharkhand) both made their List A debuts.

=== Round 6 ===
12 February 2018
Scorecard

Jharkhand; 288/9 (50 overs)	v	Chhattisgarh; 294/3 (46 overs)
Saurabh Tiwary 107 (105); Pankaj Rao 4/43 (10 overs)		Amandeep Khare 76 (74); Varun Aaron 2/51 (8 overs)

Chhattisgarh won by 7 wickets
Gymkhana Ground, Secunderabad
Umpires: Amiesh Saheba and R. Sundar

- Chhattisgarh won the toss and elected to field.
- Sanjeet Desai (Chhattisgarh) made his List A debut.

12 February 2018
Scorecard

Hyderabad; 312 (50 overs)	v	Jammu & Kashmir; 163 (34.1 overs)
Rohit Rayudu 130 (130); Umar Nazir 5/52 (10 overs)		Puneet Kumar 43 (34); Akash Bhandari 3/34 (4 overs)

Hyderabad won by 149 runs
Rajiv Gandhi International Stadium, Hyderabad
Umpires: Sudhir Asnani and Subroto Das

- Hyderabad won the toss and elected to bat.
- Puneet Kumar and Deepak Dogra (Jammu & Kashmir) both made their List A debuts.

12 February 2018
Scorecard

Services; 176 (48.2 overs)	v	Saurashtra; 181/2 (21.4 overs)
Soumik Chatterjee 52 (84); Dharmendrasinh Jadeja 4/26 (10 overs)		Samarth Vyas 114* (66); Diwesh Pathania 1/36 (5 overs)

Saurashtra won by 8 wickets
AOC Centre Thapar Stadium, Secunderabad
Umpires: Jayaraman Madanagopal and Sadashiv Iyer

- Services won the toss and elected to bat.

=== Round 7 ===
14 February 2018
Scorecard

Hyderabad; 280/8 (50 overs)	v	Chhattisgarh; 196 (44.3 overs)
Bavanaka Sandeep 79 (95); Pankaj Rao 3/52 (10 overs)		Amandeep Khare 71 (90); Mohammed Siraj 5/37 (8.3 overs)

Hyderabad won by 84 runs
Gymkhana Ground, Secunderabad
Umpires: Sudhir Asnani and Amiesh Saheba

- Hyderabad won the toss and elected to bat.

14 February 2018
Scorecard

Jharkhand; 269/9 (50 overs)	v	Jammu & Kashmir; 199 (46 overs)
Virat Singh 96 (97); Parvez Rasool 3/46 (10 overs)		Shubham Pundir 74 (74); Ashish Kumar 3/23 (7 overs)

Jharkhand won by 97 runs
Rajiv Gandhi International Stadium, Hyderabad
Umpires: Sadashiv Iyer and Chettithody Shamshuddin

- Jammu & Kashmir won the toss and elected to field.

14 February 2018
Scorecard

Vidarbha; 159 (40.5 overs)	v	Saurashtra; 161/2 (34 overs)
Jitesh Sharma 55 (69); Kamlesh Makvana 2/9 (5 overs)		Avi Barot 91* (114); Rajneesh Gurbani 1/24 (5 overs)

Saurashtra won by 8 wickets
AOC Centre Thapar Stadium, Secunderabad
Umpires: R. Sundar and Jayaraman Madanagopal

- Saurashtra won the toss and elected to field.
