= Himachal Pradesh Cricket Association =

Governing body of cricket in Himachal Pradesh, India

- Sport: Cricket
- Jurisdiction: Regional
- Abbreviation: HPCA
- Founded: 1960
- Affiliation: Board of Control for Cricket in India
- Affiliation date: 1984
- Regional affiliation: 1960
- Headquarters: Himachal Pradesh Cricket Association Stadium
- Location: Dharmashala
- President: Arun Dhumal
- Secretary: Sumit Sharma

Official website
- www.hpcricket.org
- (India)

Himachal Pradesh Cricket Association is the governing body of the Cricket activities in the Himachal Pradesh state of India and the Himachal Pradesh cricket team. It is affiliated to the Board of Control for Cricket in India.

== History ==
Himachal Pradesh Cricket Association is affiliated with the Board of Control for Cricket in India. HPCA is one of the Premier Cricket Governing provincial units affiliated to The Board of Control for Cricket in India and operates from Shimla. HPCA was established in 1960 and was granted first-class cricket status in September 1984 and played in 1984/85 season. Anurag Thakur took over Himachal Pradesh Cricket Association president-ship in 2000 as the fourth president of the board and after becoming President of BCCI in 2016, he was removed from the post of HPCA President. Subsequently Thakur's younger brother Arun Dhumal took over as the fifth HPCA President.

HPCA started construction of Himachal Pradesh Cricket Association Stadium in 2005 with cost of 60 crores and with capacity of 25,000 person. The stadium is the only stadium which can host test matches also hosted IPL matches of Kings XI Punjab as their second home. HPCA has also constructed stadium in Atal Bihari Vajpayee Stadium in Nadaun as well as Lohnu Cricket Ground in Bilaspur.

In 2006–07, Himachal Pradesh won the Plate Group of the Ranji Trophy, beating Orissa in the final[3] after finishing top of their group.

In December 2015, Asian Cricket Council decided to set up Centre of Excellence at Dharmashala as well as Himachal Pradesh Cricket Association Stadium will host its 2016 ICC World Twenty20, but due to continuous opposition from people the venue shifted.

== Divisional Association Members ==
- Cricket Association of Bilaspur
- Hamirpur Cricket Association
- Kangra District Cricket Association
- Cricket Association of Kinnaur
- Kullu District Cricket Association
- District Cricket Association Lahaul & Spiti
- Cricket Association of Mandi
- Shimla District Cricket Association
- Sirmour District Cricket Association
- Solan District Cricket Association
- District Cricket Association Una
- Adhoc Committee Chamba

== Home ground ==
- Atal Bihari Vajpayee Stadium, Nadaun
- Chail Cricket Ground, Chail
- Himachal Pradesh Cricket Ground, Gumma, Shimla
- Himachal Pradesh Cricket Association Stadium, Dharmashala - only Test venue
- Indira Gandhi Stadium, Una
- Jawaharlal Navoday Vidhyalay Stadium, Una
- Kangda Police Stadium, Kangda
- Lohnu Cricket Ground, Bilaspur
- Maharaja Lakshman Sen Memorial College Ground
- Paramount Cricket Promotion Association Stadium
- Police Stadium, Chamba
- Shaheed Krishan Chand Memorial Stadium

== Umpires ==
- Virender Sharma, BCCI Elite Panel

== Himachal Cricket Academy ==
In 2008, the HPCA established Himachal Cricket Academy in at Himachal Pradesh Cricket Association Stadium in Dharmashala with sub-academies in Kangra, MCM Chandigarh as well as all the twelve District Headquarters. The academy provides regular cricket coaching, systematic fitness management, specific nutrition, regular health check up and purposeful recreation along with the education to the potentially talented young cricketers. The academy is headed by Anuj Pal Dass.
