= 2017–18 Vijay Hazare Trophy Group C =

Cricket tournament

- Dates: 5 – 14 February 2018
- Administrator(s): BCCI
- Cricket format: List A cricket
- Tournament format(s): Round-robin and Playoff format
- Participants: 7
- Matches: 21

The 2017–18 Vijay Hazare Trophy was the 16th season of the Vijay Hazare Trophy, a List A cricket tournament in India. It was contested by the 28 domestic cricket teams of India. The following seven teams were drawn in Group C: Andhra, Goa, Gujarat, Madhya Pradesh, Mumbai, Rajasthan and Tamil Nadu. In December 2017, the fixtures were brought forward to allow players to practice ahead of the 2018 Indian Premier League.

== Points table ==
Pos	Team	Pld	W	L	T	NR	Pts	NRR
1	Andhra	6	6	0	0	0	24	0.626
2	Mumbai	6	4	2	0	0	16	0.324
3	Madhya Pradesh	6	3	3	0	0	12	0.112
4	Goa	6	3	3	0	0	12	−0.411
5	Tamil Nadu	6	2	4	0	0	8	0.468
6	Rajasthan	6	2	4	0	0	8	−0.791
7	Gujarat	6	1	5	0	0	4	−0.321

- Top two teams advanced to the knockout stage

== Fixtures ==
=== Round 1 ===
5 February 2018
Scorecard

Rajasthan; 229/6 (50 overs)	v	Andhra; 235/4 (45 overs)
Chetan Bist 82* (77); Bandaru Ayyappa 3/57 (10 overs)		Bodapati Sumanth 71* (52); Mahipal Lomror 1/28 (5 overs)

Andhra won by 6 wickets
Sri Sivasubramaniya Nadar College of Engineering Ground, Chennai
Umpires: Sanjay Hazare and Pashchim Pathak

- Andhra won the toss and elected to field.
- Siraparapu Ashish (Andhra), Amitkumar Gautam, Abhimanyu Lamba and Khaleel Ahmed (Rajasthan) all made their List A debuts.

5 February 2018
Scorecard

Tamil Nadu; 311/8 (50 overs)	v	Gujarat; 235 (45.1 overs)
Kaushik Gandhi 127 (120); Chintan Gaja 3/61 (10 overs)		Bhargav Merai 101 (97); Aswin Crist 3/44 (8 overs)

Tamil Nadu won by 76 runs
MRF Pachyappas Ground, Chennai
Umpires: Nitin Menon and Navdeep Singh

- Gujarat won the toss and elected to field.

5 February 2018
Scorecard

Mumbai; 332/5 (50 overs)	v	Madhya Pradesh; 258 (46.1 overs)
Suryakumar Yadav 134* (85); Avesh Khan 2/62 (9 overs)		Anshul Tripathi 67 (61); Shams Mulani 4/62 (9.1 overs)

Mumbai won by 74 runs
MA Chidambaram Stadium, Chennai
Umpires: K. N. Ananthapadmanabhan and Krishnaraj Srinath

- Mumbai won the toss and elected to bat.
- Mihir Hirwani, Avesh Khan, Anshul Tripathi (Madhya Pradesh), Akash Parkar, Shams Mulani and Dhrumil Matkar (Mumbai) all made their List A debuts.

=== Round 2 ===
6 February 2018
Scorecard

Madhya Pradesh; 184 (44.2 overs)	v	Andhra; 190/4 (38.5 overs)
Anshul Tripathi 39 (50); Girinath Reddy 6/24 (8.2 overs)		Hanuma Vihari 61 (60); Puneet Datey 2/26 (8 overs)

Andhra won by 6 wickets
MRF Pachyappas Ground, Chennai
Umpires: Sanjay Hazare and Pashchim Pathak

- Madhya Pradesh won the toss and elected to bat.

6 February 2018
Scorecard

Tamil Nadu; 210 (48.5 overs)	v	Goa; 211/6 (46.2 overs)
Baba Aparajith 52 (70); Darshan Misal 3/42 (10 overs)		Swapnil Asnodkar 103 (112); Ravichandran Ashwin 2/30 (10 overs)

Goa won by 4 wickets
MA Chidambaram Stadium, Chennai
Umpires: Nitin Menon and Navdeep Singh

- Tamil Nadu won the toss and elected to bat.
- Vijesh Prabhudessai and Srinivas Fadte (Goa) both made their List A debuts.

6 February 2018
Scorecard

Mumbai; 317/8 (50 overs)	v	Gujarat; 276 (47.4 overs)
Siddhesh Lad 129 (125); Ishwar Chaudhary 3/46 (10 overs)		Priyank Kirit Panchal 89 (96); Royston Dias 4/64 (9 overs)

Mumbai won by 41 runs
Sri Sivasubramaniya Nadar College of Engineering Ground, Chennai
Umpires: K. N. Ananthapadmanabhan and Krishnaraj Srinath

- Gujarat won the toss and elected to field.
- Royston Dias (Mumbai) made his List A debut.

=== Round 3 ===
8 February 2018
Scorecard

Rajasthan; 266/8 (50 overs)	v	Goa; 267/7 (49.5 overs)
Chandrapal Singh 71* (62); Amogh Sunil Desai 4/41 (10 overs)		Darshan Misal 66* (69); Abhimanyu Lamba 2/50 (10 overs)

Goa won by 3 wickets
MRF Pachyappas Ground, Chennai
Umpires: Sanjay Hazare and Pashchim Pathak

- Goa won the toss and elected to field.
- Yash Kothari (Rajasthan) made his List A debut.

8 February 2018
Scorecard

Gujarat; 248 (49.4 overs)	v	Madhya Pradesh; 253/6 (45 overs)
Priyank Kirit Panchal 65 (75); Anshul Tripathi 4/37 (9 overs)		Harpreet Singh 76 (90); Piyush Chawla 3/54 (10 overs)

Madhya Pradesh won by 4 wickets
TI Cycles Ground, Chennai
Umpires: K. N. Ananthapadmanabhan and Krishnaraj Srinath

- Gujarat won the toss and elected to bat.

8 February 2018
Scorecard

Tamil Nadu; 183 (49.3 overs)	v	Mumbai; 184/8 (48.5 overs)
Ravichandran Ashwin 41 (77); Dhawal Kulkarni 3/44 (10 overs)		Shubham Ranjane 59* (87); Ravichandran Ashwin 3/35 (10 overs)

Mumbai won by 2 wickets
Sri Sivasubramaniya Nadar College of Engineering Ground, Chennai
Umpires: Nitin Menon and Navdeep Singh

- Mumbai won the toss and elected to field.

=== Round 4 ===
9 February 2018
Scorecard

Goa; 188 (47.4 overs)	v	Andhra; 191/9 (49.3 overs)
Snehal Kauthankar 43 (71); Girinath Reddy 4/32 (6.4 overs)		Ricky Bhui 56* (86); Lakshay Garg 3/32 (10 overs)

Andhra won by 1 wicket
MA Chidambaram Stadium, Chennai
Umpires: Sanjay Hazare and Nitin Menon

- Andhra won the toss and elected to field.

9 February 2018
Scorecard

Tamil Nadu; 302/9 (50 overs)	v	Madhya Pradesh; 303/2 (46 overs)
Narayan Jagadeesan 99 (108); Ankit Kushwah 3/59 (10 overs)		Rajat Patidar 158 (111); Rahil Shah 1/47 (6 overs)

Madhya Pradesh won by 8 wickets
MRF Pachyappas Ground, Chennai
Umpires: Navdeep Singh and Pashchim Pathak

- Madhya Pradesh won the toss and elected to field.

9 February 2018
Scorecard

Mumbai; 268/8 (50 overs)	v	Rajasthan; 272/4 (47.4 overs)
Siddhesh Lad 100 (105); Khaleel Ahmed 4/35 (10 overs)		Amitkumar Gautam 149* (136); Shivam Dube 2/36 (9 overs)

Rajasthan won by 6 wickets
TI Cycles Ground, Chennai
Umpires: K. N. Ananthapadmanabhan and Krishnaraj Srinath

- Mumbai won the toss and elected to bat.
- Shiva Chouhan and Vikas Jhorar (Rajasthan) both made their List A debuts.

=== Round 5 ===
11 February 2018
Scorecard

Andhra; 276/6 (50 overs)	v	Tamil Nadu; 247/9 (48.4 overs)
Srikar Bharat 82 (85); Rahil Shah 2/39 (10 overs)		Jagatheesan Kousik 56* (52); Bandaru Ayyappa 2/37 (9 overs)

Andhra won by 29 runs
TI Cycles Ground, Chennai
Umpires: Sanjeev Dua and Kamlesh Sharma

- Tamil Nadu won the toss and elected to field.
- Manyala Pranith and Naren Reddy (Andhra) both made their List A debuts.

11 February 2018
Scorecard

Goa; 220 (48.3 overs)	v	Madhya Pradesh; 223/2 (25.4 overs)
Swapnil Asnodkar 85 (96); Sohraab Dhaliwal 3/33 (10 overs)		Rajat Patidar 124* (85); Lakshay Garg 1/23 (4 overs)

Madhya Pradesh won by 8 wickets
MA Chidambaram Stadium, Chennai
Umpires: Sanjay Hazare and Pashchim Pathak

- Madhya Pradesh won the toss and elected to field.

11 February 2018
Scorecard

Rajasthan; 172 (47.3 overs)	v	Gujarat; 176/3 (33.2 overs)
Mahipal Lomror 63 (116); Piyush Chawla 3/44 (9.3 overs)		Priyank Kirit Panchal 55 (70); Khaleel Ahmed 1/49 (10 overs)

Gujarat won by 7 wickets
Sri Sivasubramaniya Nadar College of Engineering Ground, Chennai
Umpires: Nitin Menon and Navdeep Singh

- Rajasthan won the toss and elected to bat.
- Siddharth Desai, Arzan Nagwaswalla, Kathan Patel and Rahul Shah (Gujarat) all made their List A debuts.

=== Round 6 ===
12 February 2018
Scorecard

Gujarat; 250 (50 overs)	v	Andhra; 251/1 (45.2 overs)
Rujul Bhatt 74 (98); Karthik Raman 4/32 (8 overs)		Srikar Bharat 106* (132); Siddharth Desai 1/26 (10 overs)

Andhra won by 9 wickets
TI Cycles Ground, Chennai
Umpires: Kamlesh Sharma and Nitin Menon

- Andhra won the toss and elected to field.
- Abhinav Tandel (Gujarat) made his List A debut.

12 February 2018
Scorecard

Goa; 266/8 (50 overs)	v	Mumbai; 267/6 (46.3 overs)
Suyash Prabhudessai 56 (55); Dhrumil Matkar 3/49 (9 overs)		Suryakumar Yadav 71 (85); Lakshay Garg 3/52 (8 overs)

Mumbai won by 4 wickets
Guru Nanak College Ground, Chennai
Umpires: Sanjeev Dua and Navdeep Singh

- Mumbai won the toss and elected to field.

12 February 2018
Scorecard

Madhya Pradesh; 241/9 (50 overs)	v	Rajasthan; 245/3 (47.2 overs)
Ankit Sharma 65 (80); Khaleel Ahmed 3/51 (10 overs)		Aditya Garhwal 108 (108); Ankit Kushwah 1/33 (9.2 overs)

Rajasthan won by 7 wickets
MA Chidambaram Stadium, Chennai
Umpires: Sanjay Hazare and Pashchim Pathak

- Rajasthan won the toss and elected to field.

=== Round 7 ===
14 February 2018
Scorecard

Andhra; 344/5 (50 overs)	v	Mumbai; 315/9 (50 overs)
Hanuma Vihari 169 (118); Royston Dias 3/77 (10 overs)		Siddhesh Lad 118 (98); Karthik Raman 3/55 (10 overs)

Andhra won by 29 runs
TI Cycles Ground, Chennai
Umpires: Sanjeev Dua and Navdeep Singh

- Mumbai won the toss and elected to field.

14 February 2018
Scorecard

Gujarat; 227 (49.4 overs)	v	Goa; 228/9 (48.3 overs)
Bhargav Merai 93 (118); Darshan Misal 3/36 (10 overs)		Sagun Kamat 110* (148); Piyush Chawla 3/27 (10 overs)

Goa won by 1 wicket
Guru Nanak College Ground, Chennai
Umpires: Kamlesh Sharma and Nitin Menon

- Goa won the toss and elected to field.

14 February 2018
Scorecard

Rajasthan; 141 (38.2 overs)	v	Tamil Nadu; 143/3 (23.3 overs)
Chetan Bist 36 (51); Sai Kishore 5/26 (7.2 overs)		Baba Aparajith 55* (59); Abhimanyu Lamba 1/13 (3 overs)

Tamil Nadu won by 7 wickets
MA Chidambaram Stadium, Chennai
Umpires: Sanjay Hazare and Pashchim Pathak

- Tamil Nadu won the toss and elected to field.
