= List of Lancashire County Cricket Club grounds =

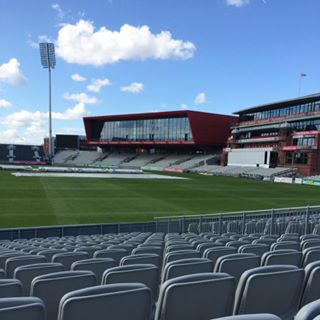
Old Trafford hosted Lancashire's debut home match in first-class cricket and remains the club's primary ground.

Lancashire County Cricket Club is one of the eighteen member clubs of the English County Championship, representing the historic county of Lancashire. The club was established on 12 January 1864 and has competed in first-class cricket from 1865, List A cricket from 1963 and Twenty20 cricket from 2003.^{[A]} Unlike most professional sports, in which a team usually has a single fixed home ground, county cricket clubs have traditionally used different grounds in various towns and cities within or close to the county for home matches, although the use of minor "out grounds" away from the club's main headquarters has diminished since the 1980s.

Old Trafford in Manchester has played host to the club's first home fixtures in all three formats of the game; in first-class cricket in 1865 against Middlesex; in List A cricket in 1963 against Leicestershire; and in Twenty20 cricket against Yorkshire in 2003. Lancashire have played home matches at fifteen different grounds, but have played the majority of their home fixtures at Old Trafford, which also hosts Test, One Day International and Twenty20 International cricket matches. Two matches in the 2020 Bob Willis Trophy had to be played at 'neutral' venues due to Old Trafford being used for International cricket during the COVID-19 pandemic and the need for a bio-secure bubble.

== Grounds ==
Below is a complete list of grounds used by Lancashire County Cricket Club (LCCC) for first-class, List A and Twenty20 matches to the end of the 2020 season. Only matches played by LCCC are recorded in the table. Matches not involving LCCC are mentioned in the notes. Lancashire played two home fixtures at neutral venues in the 2020 Bob Willis Trophy due to Covid Protocols and International Cricket at Old Trafford.

Name	Location	First-class		List A		Twenty20		Notes
Name	Location	First	Last	First	Last	First	Last	Notes
Old Trafford	Manchester	20 July 1865 v Middlesex	22 July 2018 v Yorkshire	1 May 1963 v Leicestershire	5 June 2018 v Yorkshire	19 June 2003 v Yorkshire	10 August 2018 v Warwickshire	^{[B]}
Wavertree Road Ground	Liverpool	only match: 23 August 1866 v Surrey		–	–	–	–	(Note: The Gentlemen of the North and the Gentlemen of the South played one first-class match here in 1859, while the first-class North v South fixture was played here twice in 1863 and 1872. Only the first-class matches played at the ground by Lancashire are recorded in the table.)
Station Road	Whalley	only match: 20 June 1867 v Yorkshire		–	–	–	–	(Note: The only first-class match played here was the first ever Roses Match between Lancashire and Yorkshire.)
Castleton Cricket Club Ground	Rochdale	only match: 15 June 1876 v Kent		–	–	–	–	
Aigburth Cricket Ground	Liverpool	13 June 1881 v Cambridge University	13 July 2014 v Nottinghamshire	17 May 1970 v Northamptonshire	5 May 2017 v Northamptonshire	22 June 2009 v Leicestershire	9 July 2017 v Leicestershire	(Note: Liverpool and District played fourteen first-class matches at the ground between 1882–1894. Only the first-class matches played at the ground by Lancashire are recorded in the table. The Lancashire Cricket Board played one List A match here against the Netherlands in the 1999 NatWest Trophy. Only the List A matches played at the ground by Lancashire are recorded in the table.)
Stanley Park	Blackpool	31 August 1905 v England XI	17 August 2011 v Worcestershire	15 August 1976 v Sussex	13 July 2003 v India A	–	–	(Note: Various teams have played first-class matches at Stanley Park. Only the first-class matches played at the ground by Lancashire are recorded in the table.)
Lune Road	Lancaster	only match: 30 July 1914 v Warwickshire		–	–	–	–	
Seedhill	Nelson	15 August 1925 v Derbyshire	13 July 1938 v Somerset	–	–	–	–	
Alexandra Meadows	Blackburn	11 May 1932 v Glamorgan	5 June 1935 v Glamorgan	–	–	–	–	
West Cliff	Preston	1 July 1936 v Gloucestershire	18 June 1952 v Glamorgan	–	–	–	–	
Trafalgar Road	Southport	22 August 1959 v Worcestershire	15 May 2026 v Worcestershire	13 July 1969 v Glamorgan	12 May 1987 v Scotland	–	–	
Church Road	Lytham St Annes	14 August 1985 v Northamptonshire	14 July 1998 v Worcestershire	–	–	–	–	
Moss Lane	Alderley Edge	–	–	only match: 30 July 2008 v Bangladesh A		–	–	(Note: Moss Lane is located in the adjacent county of Cheshire. Cheshire played a single List A match here against Hampshire in the 2004 Cheltenham & Gloucester Trophy. Only the List A match played at the ground by Lancashire is recorded in the table.)
Sedbergh School	Sedbergh	only match: 30 June 2019 v Durham		–	–	–	–	
Farington Cricket Ground	Farington	–	–	28 July 2026 v Kent	30 July 2026 v Nottinghamshire	–	–	

== Notes ==
A. First-class cricket matches are designed to be contested over three or more days, with each team permitted two innings with no limit to the number of overs in an innings. List A matches, also known as limited overs or one-day matches, are intended to be completed in a single day and restrict each team to a single innings of between 40 and 60 overs, depending on the specific competition. Twenty20 matches restrict each team to a single innings of 20 overs.

B. England have played Test matches at Old Trafford since 1884 and the ground has also been used as the home venue for first-class teams billed as England XI, the All England Eleven, The North, Gentlemen of the North and A. Shrewsbury's Australian Team. Other matches there have been Test Trials and internationals not involving England. Only the first-class matches played at the ground by Lancashire are included in the totals.
