= Darwen Cricket Club =

- The Towers
- League: Lancashire League

Personnel
- 1st XI captain: Reece Davies
- 2nd XI captain: Greg Lawrenson
- Chairman: Chris Lowe
- Overseas player: Sangeeth Cooray (Sri Lanka)

Team information
- Colours: Blue and yellow
- Founded: 1901
- Home ground: The Brookhouse Aerospace Birch Hall Cricket Ground.
- Official website: darwencricketclub.com

Darwen Cricket Club play in the Lancashire League and are based at The Brookhouse Aerospace Birch Hall Cricket Ground. in Darwen, Lancashire. They are also known as 'The Towers'.

The club has played in the Ribblesdale League and were a founder member of the Northern Cricket League in 1952, joining the Lancashire League in 2017.

== History ==
A Darwen club played for a brief period in the Central Lancashire League and Ribblesdale League in the late 1800s before disbanding. The current team was founded as Darwen Etrurians Cricket Club in 1901. The club re-joined the Ribblesdale League in 1909, changing their name to Darwen Cricket Club in 1910. After sharing a ground at Barley Bank, the former home of Darwen FC, the club moved to their present ground at Birch Hall in 1920. They switched to the Northern League for its inaugural season in 1952.

From start of the 2017 season Darwen, along with Clitheroe and Great Harwood, moved to the Lancashire League. The club had a successful first campaign with the first XI finishing the season as runners-up in the league and winning the Worsley Cup.

In September 2018 Darwen were crowned the county's club champions after beating Clifton CC in the LCF Knockout Cup.

On 4 September 2022, the club completed the full set of county honours when defeating Greenmount CC by 13 runs to become Lancashire League Champions.

== Honours ==
Ribblesdale League

- 1st XI League Winners - 3 - 1922, 1934, 1940 (shared).

Northern League

- 1st XI League Winners - 5 - 1966, 1987, 1999, 2002, 2004.
- 1st XI League (Division Two) Winners - 2 - 1959, 1966.

Lancashire League

- 1st XI Premier League Winners - 1 - 2022.
- 1st XI Holland Cup Winners - 3 - 2017, 2021, 2024.
- T20 Competition Winners - 1 - 2021.
- Worsley Cup Winners - 2 - 2017, 2019.
- Ron Singleton Colne Trophy Winners - 2 - 2018, 2023 (both shared).
- 2nd XI Junior League Winners - 2 - 2018, 2023.
- 2nd XI (Lancashire Telegraph) Cup Winners - 1 - 2018.

Lancashire Cricket Board Cup

- Winners - 1 - 2018.
- Runners Up - 3 - 1994, 2006, 2019.

== Notable players ==
- Atif Ashraf.
- Tom Dewdney.
- Robert Entwistle.
- Scott Hookey.
- Siddhesh Lad.
- Ken Rickards.
- Keith Semple.
- Ken Snellgrove.
- David Wiese.
