= Colin Hilton =

English cricketer (1937–2015)

Personal information
- Born: 26 September 1937; Atherton, Lancashire, England
- Died: 30 October 2015 (aged 78); Wigan, Greater Manchester
- Batting: Right-handed
- Bowling: Right-arm fast
- Role: Bowler

Domestic team information
- Years: Team
- 1957–1963: Lancashire
- 1964: Essex

Career statistics
Competition	FC	List A
Matches	115	4
Runs scored	665	5
Batting average	7.47
100s/50s	0/0
Top score	36
Balls bowled
Wickets	321
Bowling average	28.15
5 wickets in innings	8
10 wickets in match	1
Best bowling	6/38
Catches/stumpings	40
- Source: Cricinfo, 19 July 2013

Colin Hilton (26 September 1937 – 30 October 2015) was an English cricketer. He played for Lancashire between 1957 and 1963 and for Essex in 1964. He played as a professional for Morecambe Cricket Club in the Northern Cricket League during 1968 and 1969, setting a league record of 113 wickets during the 1968 season; this record remains unbeaten.
