= Chorley Cricket Club =

English cricket club

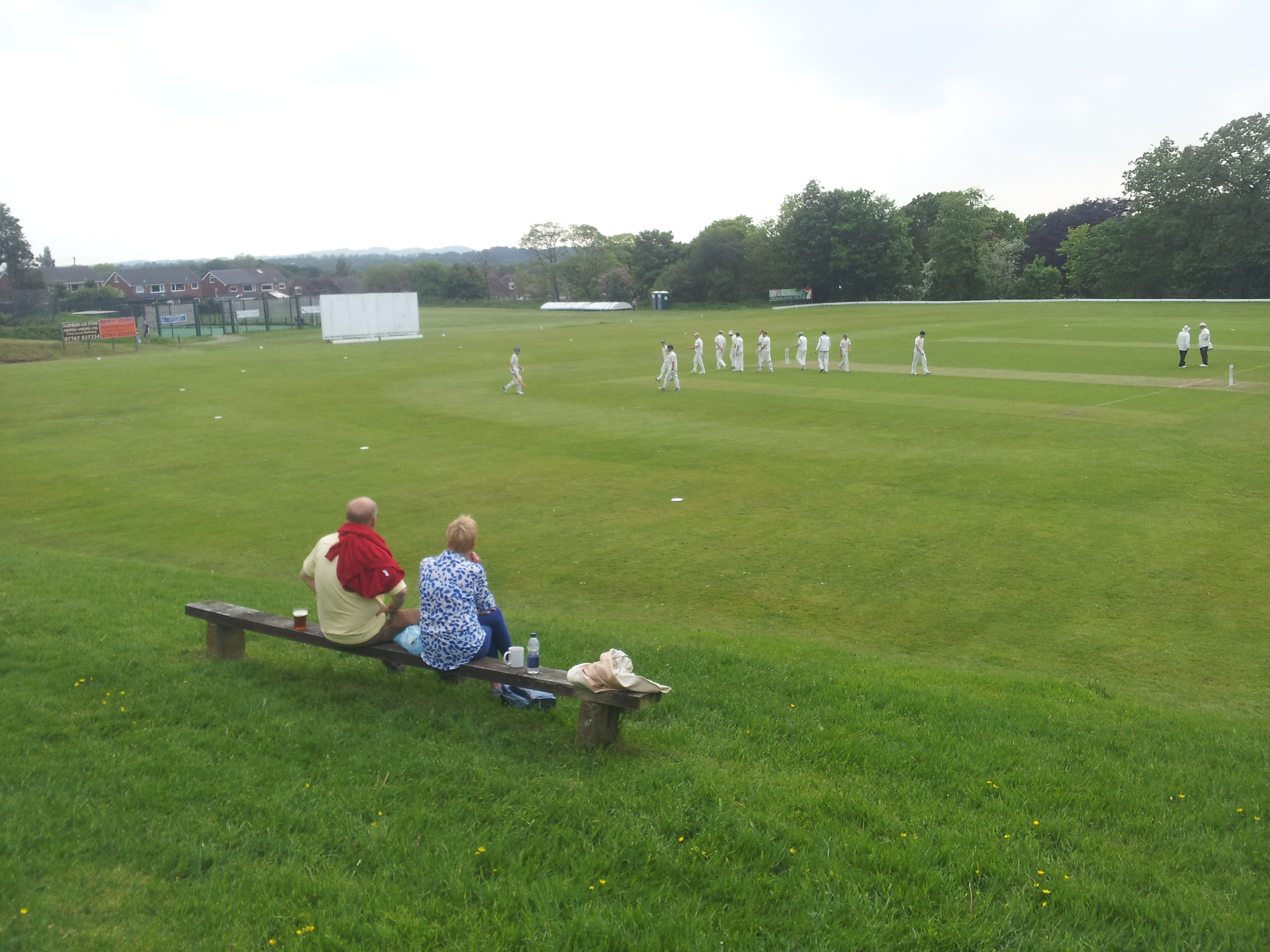
Cup Match At Chorley's Windsor Park in 2016

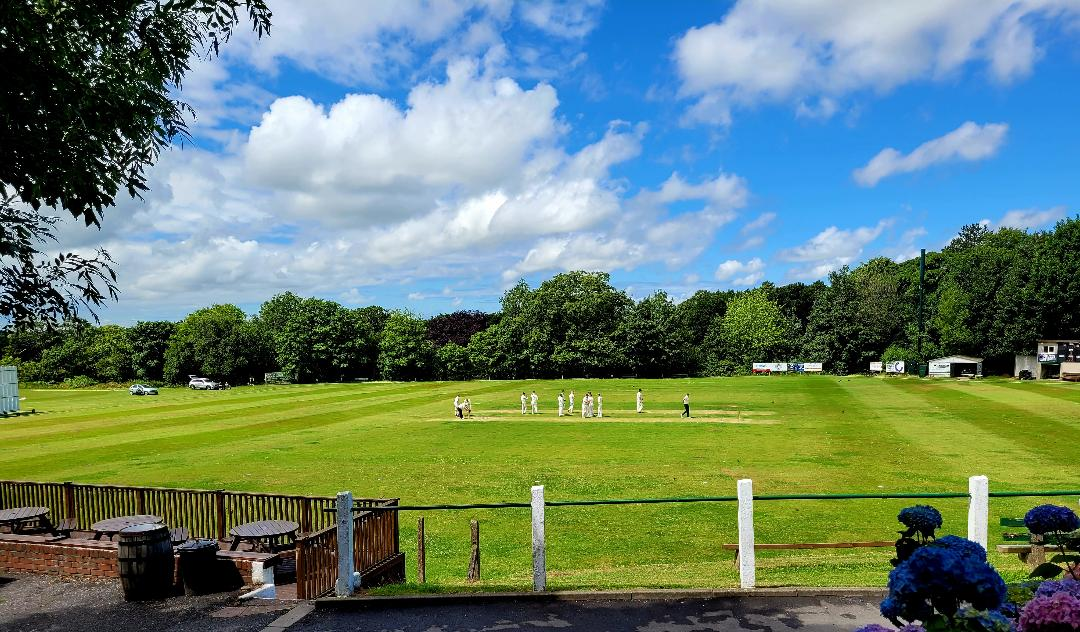
High Summer at Windsor Park Chorley, 2022

club based in Chorley, Lancashire. The club's first team compete in the ECB Northern Premier Cricket League, while the Second, Third and Sunday development teams take part in the more locally based Palace Shield along with all Junior teams from a large and healthy junior section.

The club gained prominence nationally in the 1990s when Chorley the final of the Abbot Ale ECB National Club Cricket Championship at Lords in 1994, 1995 and 1996. Chorley won the trophy beating Ealing in '94 and Clifton Bourton in '95 whilst losing to Walsall in the '96 final. The unbeaten run of 26 matches in the competition until the '96 final is probably unique. They were captained by the formidable Roland Horridge.

For the summer of 2025 the club pulled off a significant coup in signing South Africa test batsman Keegan Petersen

Notable previous professionals who have played at Chorley include;

Jo Angel (Western Australia & Australia)

Josh Marquet (Tasmania)

Chris Hartley (Queensland Bulls & Aus A)

Friedel de Wet (Lions & South Africa),

Tom Smith (Lancashire County Cricket Club)

Siddhesh Lad (Mumbai cricket club, Goa)

Roshen Silva (Sri Lanka national cricket team)

Keith Eccleshare

Colin Miller (cricketer),

Marques Ackerman

John oleary

Notable individuals who have played cricket for Chorley Cricket Club include; Bill Beaumont, Paul Grayson (rugby union), Paul Mariner & James Sutherland (cricketer).

Honours for Chorley Cricket Club include:

League Champions: 1971 & 1980

Northern League T20 Cup Winners 2018 & 2022

Slater Cup Winners: 1967 & 2000

John oleary's 3 in 22 historic moment

Matthew Brown Trophy Winners: 1981

Martini Rossi Trophy Winners: 1982 & 1983

Slalom Lager Trophy Winners: 1991

Vaux Bitter Cup Winners: 1995

2nd Division Champions: 1954

Latus Trophy Winners 1989

Blackledge Trophy Winners 1991

Lancashire Cup Winners: 1992

Abbot Ale ECB Cup National Club Championship Champions: 1994 & 1995 - Runners-up: 1996
