= Westcliff (disambiguation) =

Westcliff is a suburb of Southend-on-Sea, a city in Essex, England.

Westcliff or West Cliff may also refer to:

== Places ==
- West Cliff, Bournemouth, a suburb of Bournemouth, a town in Dorset, England
- West Cliff, Preston, a cricket ground in Preston, a city in Lancashire, England
- Westcliff, Dumbarton, Scotland, a public housing estate
- Westcliff, Gauteng, a suburb of Johannesburg, South Africa
- West Cliff, a geographic feature and district of Whitby, North Yorkshire, England

== Education ==
- Westcliff University, a private, for-profit university in Irvine, California
- Westcliff High School for Boys, a highschool in Essex, England
- Westcliff High School for Girls, a highschool in Essex, England

== Other uses ==
- Westcliff (card game), a patience or solitaire
- Westcliff railway station
- Westcliff RFC, a rugby club

== See also ==
- Westcliffe (disambiguation)
