= Lune Road Ground =

Cricket ground in England

Coordinates: 54.05257°N 2.81458°W

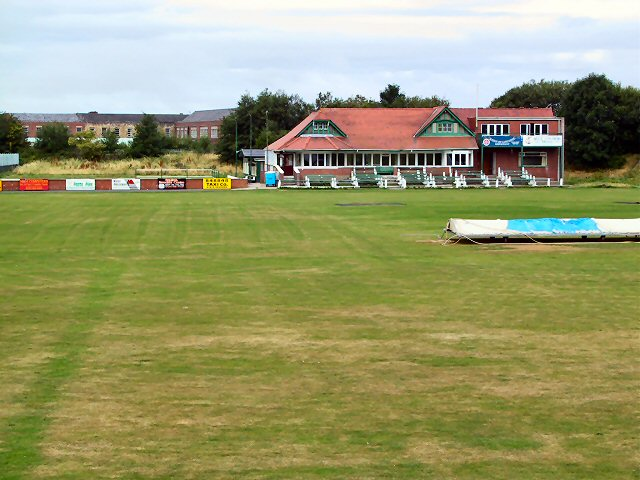

Ground information
- Location: Lancaster, Lancashire
- Establishment: 1907 (first recorded match)

Team information
Lancashire	(1914)
- As of 4 September 2010; Source: profile

Lune Road Ground is a cricket ground in Lancaster, Lancashire. The ground is situated on the bank of the River Lune. The first recorded match on the ground was in 1907, when the Lancashire Second XI played Durham in the Minor Counties Championship.

In 1914, the ground held its only first-class match when Lancashire played Warwickshire in the County Championship.

With the first recorded match on the ground in 1907 involving the Lancashire Second XI, the ground has since held a combined total of 9 Second XI fixtures for the Lancashire Second XI in the Minor Counties Championship, Second XI Championship and Second XI Trophy up to 1995.

In local domestic cricket, the ground is the home venue of Lancaster Cricket Club who play in the Palace Shield.
