= Sumanta Gupta =

Indian cricketer (born 1991)

Personal information
- Full name: Sumanta Anil Gupta
- Born: 9 February 1991 (age 35); Rampurhat, West Bengal, India
- Nickname: Bittu
- Batting: Right-handed
- Bowling: leg break Googly

Domestic team information
- Years: Team
- 2017/18–present: Bengal

Career statistics
Competition	FC	LA	T20
Matches	4	12	4
Runs scored	213	260	3
Batting average	35.5	28.88	3.00
100s/50s	0/3	0/1	0/0
Top score	82	69*	3
Balls bowled	0	48	42
Wickets	0	8	2
Bowling average	–	–	26.50
5 wickets in innings	0	0	0
10 wickets in match	0	0	0
Best bowling	–	–	1/9
Catches/stumpings	0/–	4/–	2/–
- Source: Cricinfo, 27 April 2025

Sumanta Gupta (Bengali: সুমন্ত গুপ্ত; born 9 February 1991) is an Indian cricketer. He made his List A debut for Bengal in the 2017–18 Vijay Hazare Trophy on 7 February 2018.
