= Trivendra Kumar =

Indian cricketer (born 1995)

Personal information
- Born: 2 March 1995 (age 31); Mundbhar, Uttar Pradesh, India
- Source: Cricinfo, 8 February 2018

Trivendra Kumar (born 2 March 1995) is an Indian cricketer. He made his List A debut for Services in the 2017–18 Vijay Hazare Trophy on 8 February 2018.
