= Alok Singh =

Indian cricketer (born 1993)

Alok Pratap Singh
Personal information
- Full name: Alok Pratap Singh
- Born: 26 October 1993 (age 33); Sitalpur, West Bengal, India
- Batting: Right-handed
- Bowling: Right arm fast medium
- Role: Bowler

Domestic team information
- Years: Team
- 2012/13–2017/18: Bengal
- Source: CricketArchive, 30 October 2023

Alok Pratap Singh (born 26 October 1993) is an Indian cricketer who played for Bengal from 2012/13 to 2017/18. He is a right arm fast medium bowler and a right-handed tail-end batter. He has played in 3 Twenty 20 and 2 List A matches for Bengal, but has not played in first-class matches. His best bowling performance has been 4/36 in a List A match. He made his List A debut in the 2017–18 Vijay Hazare Trophy on 13 February 2018.

== See also ==
- List of Bengal cricketers
