= Shanu Saini =

Indian cricketer (born 1997)

Personal information
- Full name: Shanu Rajeshwarprakash Saini
- Born: 30 June 1997 (age 29); Saharanpur, Uttar Pradesh, India
- Batting: Left-handed
- Bowling: Slow left arm orthodox
- Source: Cricinfo, 12 November 2019

Shanu Saini (born 30 June 1997) is an Indian cricketer. He made his List A debut on 17 February 2018, for Uttar Pradesh in the 2017–18 Vijay Hazare Trophy. He made his Twenty20 debut on 12 November 2019, for Uttar Pradesh in the 2019–20 Syed Mushtaq Ali Trophy.
