= Ishtiaq Elahi =

Indian cricketer (born 1998)

Personal information
- Born: 7 March 1998 (age 28); Srinagar, India
- Source: ESPNcricinfo, 6 February 2018

Ishtiaq Elahi (born 7 March 1998) is an Indian cricketer. He made his List A debut for Jammu and Kashmir in the 2017–18 Vijay Hazare Trophy on 6 February 2018.
