= Shiva Chouhan =

Indian cricketer (born 1997)

Personal information
- Born: 30 December 1997 (age 28)
- Batting: Right handed
- Bowling: Right arm medium pace
- Role: Batting all rounder
- Source: Cricinfo, 9 February 2018

Shiva Chouhan (born 30 December 1997) is an Indian cricketer. He made his List A debut for Rajasthan in the 2017–18 Vijay Hazare Trophy on 9 February 2018.
