= Sagar Sharma =

Indian cricketer (born 1997)

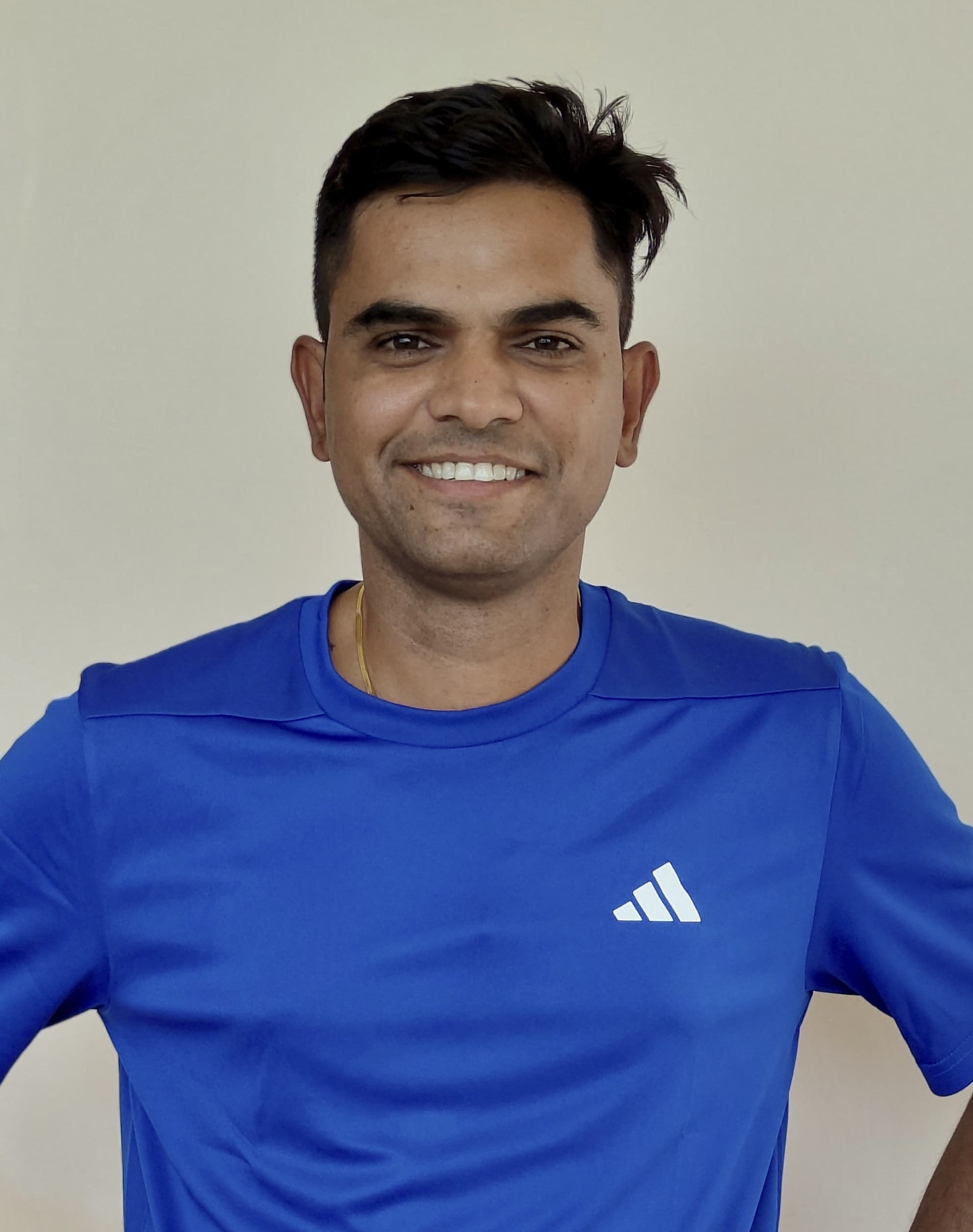

Personal information
- Born: 30 December 1997 (age 28)
- Source: Cricinfo, 5 February 2018

Sagar Sharma (born 30 December 1997) is an Indian cricketer. He made his List A debut for Services in the 2017–18 Vijay Hazare Trophy on 5 February 2018.
