= Roland Horridge =

English cricketer (born 1963)

Personal information
- Full name: Roland Edward William George Horridge
- Born: 27 January 1963 (age 63); Radcliffe, Lancashire, England
- Batting: Right-handed
- Bowling: Right-arm medium

Domestic team information
- Years: Team
- 1999–2001: Lancashire Cricket Board

Career statistics
Competition	LA
Matches	5
Runs scored	69
Batting average	23.00
100s/50s	–/–
Top score	27*
Balls bowled	–
Wickets	–
Bowling average	–
5 wickets in innings	–
10 wickets in match	–
Best bowling	–
Catches/stumpings	1/–
- Source: Cricinfo, 14 November 2010

Roland Edward William George Horridge (born 27 January 1963) is an English former cricketer. Horridge was a right-handed batsman who bowled right-arm medium pace. He was born at Radcliffe, Lancashire.

He captained Chorley from 1990 to 2001, leading the club to an unprecedented three successive finals (1994, 1995 and 1996) in the National Club Cricket Championship, winning in 1994 and 1995. The club were awarded nine trophies during his captainship.

He secured many cup competition wins for Chorley the league title eluded him Chorley were runners up six times in eleven years under his captaincy. He remains involved at the club, as his sons play.

Horridge represented the Lancashire Cricket Board in List A cricket. His debut List A match came against the Netherlands in the 1999 NatWest Trophy. he represented the Board in 5 List A matches, the last of which came against Cheshire in the 1st round of the 2002 Cheltenham & Gloucester Trophy which was played in 2001. In his 5 List A matches, he scored 69 runs at a batting average of 23.00, with a high score of 67*.

Horridge also played rugby in the Hong Kong Sevens in 1984 against the All Blacks.
