= Sahban Khan =

Indian cricketer (born 1995)

Personal information
- Born: 5 December 1995 (age 30); Janjgir–Champa, Chhattisgarh, India
- Source: Cricinfo, 5 February 2018

Sahban Khan (born 5 December 1995) is an Indian cricketer. He made his List A debut for Chhattisgarh in the 2017–18 Vijay Hazare Trophy on 5 February 2018.
