= Shashank Chandrakar =

Indian cricketer (born 1994)

Personal information
- Born: 13 May 1994 (age 32)

Domestic team information
- Years: Team
- 2018–present: Chhattisgarh
- 2024–present: Bastar Bisons
- Source: Cricinfo, 5 February 2018

Shashank Chandrakar (born 13 May 1994) is an Indian cricketer. He made his List A debut for Chhattisgarh in the 2017–18 Vijay Hazare Trophy on 5 February 2018. He made his first-class debut on 3 January 2020, for Chhattisgarh in the 2019–20 Ranji Trophy.
