= Westcliffe =

Westcliffe may refer to:

- Westcliffe, Colorado, United States
- West Cliffe, Kent, England
- Westcliffe Estates, a neighbourhood of Ottawa, Canada

== See also ==
- Westcliff (disambiguation)
