= Prashant Kore =

Indian cricketer (born 1995)

Prathamesh Kore
Personal information
- Born: 6 October 1995 (age 31)
- Source: Cricinfo, 21 February 2018

Prathamesh Kore (born 6 October 1995) is an Indian cricketer. He made his List A debut for Maharashtra in the 2017–18 Vijay Hazare Trophy on 21 February 2018.
