= Vikas Jhorar =

Indian cricketer

Personal information
- Full name: Vikas Jhorar
- Source: Cricinfo, 9 February 2018

Vikas Jhorar is an Indian cricketer. He made his List A debut for Rajasthan in the 2017–18 Vijay Hazare Trophy on 9 February 2018.
