= Priyanshu Khanduri =

Indian cricketer (born 1995)

Personal information
- Full name: Priyanshu Suresh Khanduri
- Born: 14 October 1995 (age 31); Dehradun, Uttarakhand, India

Domestic team information
- Years: Team
- 2018-2021: Himachal Pradesh
- 2022-present: Uttarakhand
- Source: Cricinfo, 6 October 2017

Priyanshu Khanduri (born 14 October 1995) is an Indian cricketer. He made his first-class debut for Himachal Pradesh in the 2017–18 Ranji Trophy on 6 October 2017. He made his List A debut for Himachal Pradesh in the 2017–18 Vijay Hazare Trophy on 15 February 2018. He is also the overseas professional player for Lincolnshire County Cricket Board Premier League side Scunthorpe Town CC.
