= Fazil Fanoos =

Indian cricketer (born 1997)

Personal information
- Born: 6 October 1997 (age 29); Thiruvananthapuram, Kerala, India
- Batting: Right-handed
- Bowling: Right-arm medium fast
- Role: Bowler

Domestic team information
- Years: Team
- 2018-present: Kerala
- Source: ESPNcricinfo, 13 February 2018

Fazil Fanoos (born 6 October 1997) is an Indian cricketer who plays domestic cricket for Kerala. He is a right-arm medium fast bowler.

== Career ==
He made his List A debut for Kerala in the 2017–18 Vijay Hazare Trophy on 13 February 2018. He was a part of the KCA Tigers 14-men squad for 2020-21 KCA President's Cup T20. He is playing for the Alleppey Ripples team in the Kerala Cricket League 2024.
