= Hardik Sethi =

Indian cricketer (born 1993)

Personal information
- Full name: Hardik Rajeev Sethi
- Born: 26 February 1993 (age 33); Bikaner, India
- Batting: Right-handed
- Bowling: Right arm offbreak

Domestic team information
- Years: Team
- 2016–17: Services
- Source: ESPNcricinfo, 29 January 2017

Hardik Sethi (born 26 February 1993) is an Indian cricketer. He made his Twenty20 debut for Services in the 2016–17 Inter State Twenty-20 Tournament on 29 January 2017. He made his List A debut for Services in the 2017–18 Vijay Hazare Trophy on 5 February 2018.
