= Friedel de Wet =

South African cricketer (born 1980)

Personal information
- Born: 26 June 1980 (age 46); Durban, Natal Province, South Africa
- Batting: Right-handed
- Bowling: Right-arm fast-medium

International information
- National side: South Africa
- Test debut (cap 305): 16 December 2009 v England
- Last Test: 3 January 2010 v England

Domestic team information
- Years: Team
- 2001/02–2002/03: Northerns
- 2004/05–2013/14: North West
- 2004/05–2010/11: Highveld Lions
- 2011: Hampshire
- 2011/12: Dolphins

Career statistics
Competition	Test	FC	LA	T20
Matches	2	62	74	16
Runs scored	20	1,090	294	43
Batting average	10.00	17.30	19.60	14.33
100s/50s	0/0	0/2	0/1	0/0
Top score	20	73	56*	17
Balls bowled	426	12,373	3,195	322
Wickets	6	229	75	17
Bowling average	31.00	25.92	34.80	25.82
5 wickets in innings	0	10	1	0
10 wickets in match	0	2	0	0
Best bowling	4/55	7/61	5/59	2/18
Catches/stumpings	1/–	29/–	12/–	5/–
- Source: CricketArchive, 25 January 2025

Friedel de Wet (born 26 June 1980) is a South African former first-class cricketer.

de Wet was born at Durban and educated at Grenswag High School in Rustenburg and the University of Technology in Pretoria. He represented the United Cricket Board of South Africa (UCBSA) National Academy, Titans, Lions, North West and the Northerns as a right-handed batsman and a right-arm fast-medium bowler. He took 48 wickets at 22.00 for the Lions in 2006–07.

de Wet toured India with the South Africa 'A' party in 2007–08 and signed for Middlesex as a Kolpak registration for the 2008 season. On 5 January 2011 it was announced that he would play for Hampshire as a Kolpak registration for the 2011 season. He also had a spell in the Lancashire Cricket League with Chorley Cricket Club in 2008 taking 56 wickets at an average of just over 13. In 2012, de Wet announced an immediate retirement to his cricketing career due to a persistent back injury which troubled him throughout his career.

== International career ==
In December 2009, he received "an unexpected call-up" to South Africa's Test squad for the series against England. When Dale Steyn was injured just before the first Test, de Wet was given his debut. He made 20 runs in his first Test innings and took the wicket of Alastair Cook. in England's first innings. He took four further wickets in the second innings, three of them coming with the second new ball in the final hour of the game as South Africa almost engineered a victory, England eventually holding on to draw with nine wickets down.
