= Shyam Gan =

Indian cricketer (born 1998)

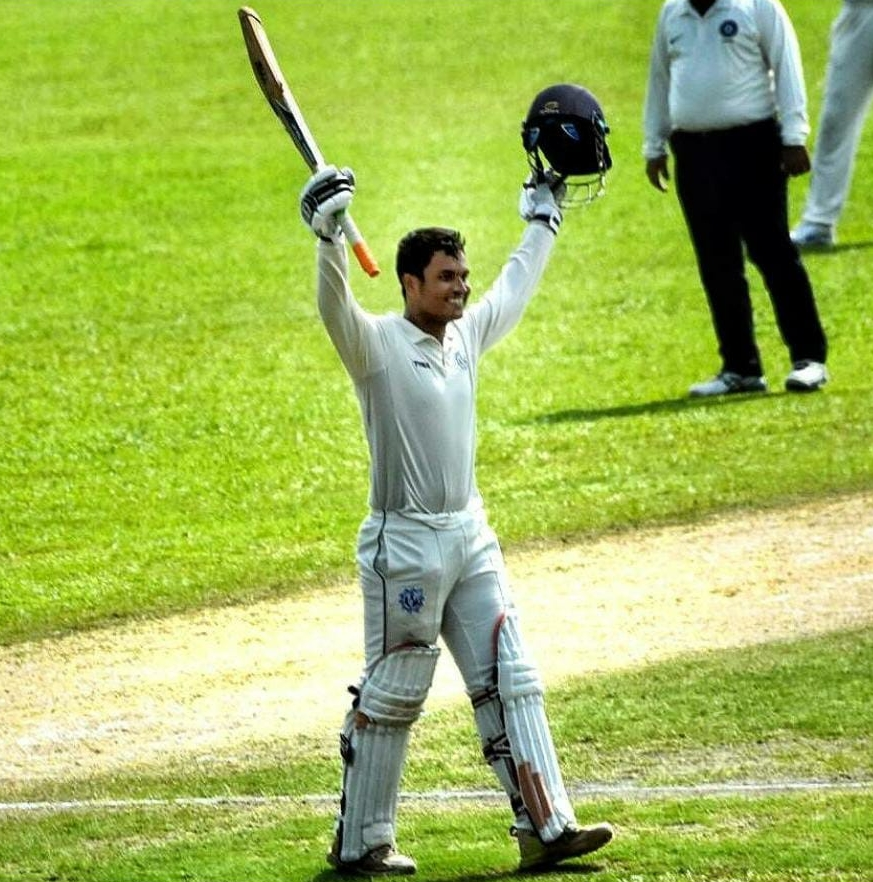

Personal information
- Full name: Shyam Amitabha Gan
- Born: 11 October 1998 (age 28)
- Role: Batsmen
- Source: Cricinfo, 7 February 2018

Shyam Gan (born 11 October 1998) is an Indian cricketer. He made his List A debut for Tripura in the 2017–18 Vijay Hazare Trophy on 7 February 2018.
