= Netherfield Cricket Club =

Cricket ground in Kendal, Cumbria, England

Coordinates: 54°19′18″N 2°44′05″W

Netherfield Cricket Club Ground
Ground information
- Location: Kendal, Cumbria
- Establishment: 1893 (first recorded match)

Team information
Cumberland	(1956–present)
- As of 28 July 2010; Source: Ground profile

Netherfield Cricket Club Ground is a cricket ground in Kendal, Cumbria (formerly part of Westmorland). The first recorded match on the ground was in 1893. The ground hosted its first Minor Counties Championship match in 1956, when Cumberland played the Lancashire Second XI. From 1956 to 2007, the ground hosted 44 Minor Counties Championship matches, with the final Minor Counties Championship match played to date at the ground in 2007 seeing Cumberland host Norfolk. The ground has also hosted 3 MCCA Knockout Trophy matches, the most recent of which saw Cumberland play Cheshire in 2010.

The ground has also hosted List-A matches. The first List-A match held at the ground was between Cumberland and the Derbyshire in the 1st round of the 1984 NatWest Trophy. Between 1984 and 1999 the ground hosted 5 List-A matches, the last of which was between Cumberland and Sussex in the 1999 NatWest Trophy 3rd round.

== Netherfield Cricket Club ==
In local domestic cricket, Netherfield Cricket Club Ground is the home ground of Netherfield Cricket Club, who play in the Northern Premier Cricket League. Their second team playing in the Northern League Division Two. The club has a 3rd and 4th team who play in the Westmorland Cricket League in their respective divisions. Over the years the club has had many successes including winning the northern premier Cricket League in 1997, 1998, 2000, 2001, 2008 and 2017. They have also won the Lancashire Cup in 2000 and the League Cup in 2009.

Over the years the club have had some well known professionals including Jacques Kallis, Herschelle Gibbs, Charl Langeveldt, Dirk Nannes and Dale Benkenstein. In the title winning season of 2008 they had Callum Ferguson who broke the league batting record with 1,381 runs. Ferguson went on to be selected for the Australian One Day International squad that winter. The club's professional for the 2009 season was Glen Batticciotto and the club announced that the professional for the 2010 season would be Australian Nick Kruger. For the 2022 season the professional will be the Indian Ashutosh Singh.

The club also runs junior teams at under 11, 13 and 16 level and has produced many players who have played at junior and senior minor counties cricket for Cumberland and the Cumbria Cricket Board.
