= Kangda Police Stadium =

Cricket ground in Dharamsala, India

Coordinates: 32°12′13.86″N 76°19′26.46″E

Kangra Police Stadium
- Interactive map of Kangra Police Stadium

Ground information
- Location: Dharamsala, India
- Country: India
- Establishment: 1990 (first recorded match)

Team information
Himachal Pradesh	(1990–1991)
- As of 29 October 2011; Source: Ground profile

The Kangra Police Stadium is a cricket ground in Dharamshala, Himachal Pradesh, India. The ground first held a first-class match in 1990 when Himachal Pradesh played Haryana in the 1990/91 Ranji Trophy. The following season a further first-class match was held when Himachal Pradesh played the Services in the 1991/92 Ranji Trophy. No further major matches have been staged there.
