= Ankit Kushwah =

Indian cricketer (born 1992)

Personal information
- Full name: Ankit Singh Kushwah
- Born: 20 April 1992 (age 34)
- Batting: Right-handed
- Source: ESPNcricinfo, 10 January 2016

Ankit Kushwah (born 20 April 1992) is an Indian cricketer who plays for Madhya Pradesh.

He made his first-class debut on 6 February 2015 in the 2014–15 Ranji Trophy. He made his Twenty20 debut on 2 January 2016 in the 2015–16 Syed Mushtaq Ali Trophy. He made his List A debut for Madhya Pradesh in the 2016–17 Vijay Hazare Trophy on 3 March 2017.
