= Police Stadium, Chamba =

Cricket ground in India

Coordinates: 32°33′00.67″N 76°07′49.43″E

Police Stadium
Ground information
- Location: Chamba, India
- Establishment: 1995 (first recorded match)

Team information
Himachal Pradesh	(1995–1999)
- As of 21 October 2011; Source: Ground profile

The Police Stadium is a cricket ground in Chamba, Himachal Pradesh, India. The first recorded match on the ground came when Himachal Pradesh Under-19s played Haryana Under-19s in 1995. The ground held its first first-class match in December 1995 when Himachal Pradesh played Jammu and Kashmir in the 1995/96 Ranji Trophy. The following season a further first-class match was held when Himachal Pradesh played Haryana in the 1996/97 Ranji Trophy. Three seasons later the ground held a third first-class match between Himachal Pradesh and Jammu and Kashmir in the 1999/00 Ranji Trophy. Three List A matches have also been held on the ground, with the first coming in the 1995/96 Ranji Trophy one-day competition when Himachal Pradesh played Jammu and Kashmir. The others followed when Himachal Pradesh played Haryana in the 1996/97 competition and when Himachal Pradesh played Jammu and Kashmir in the 1999/00 competition. No further major matches have been staged there.
