= Northern Premier Cricket League =

EBC Premier League

- Countries: England
- Administrator: ECB
- Format: Limited Overs
- First edition: 1951 (Founded); 2000 (ECB Premier League)
- Tournament format: League
- Number of teams: 10 (Division One); 10 (Division Two)
- Current champion: Netherfield CC
- Most successful: Blackpool CC (18 titles)
- Website: https://npcl.play-cricket.com/

The Northern Premier Cricket League is a cricket league in the North West of England and was designated as an ECB Premier League in 2000. Prior to that date it was known as the Northern Cricket League.

Because the Northern Premier Cricket League had no formal feeder league and no automatic relegation and promotion, the ECB suggested on several occasions that its ECB Premier League status might be withdrawn. As from 2017, the Palace Shield became the Northern Premier League's feeder league and promotion and relegation between the two leagues took place for the first time at the end of the 2017 season.

== History ==
The Northern Cricket League was founded on 10 November 1951, in controversial circumstances. Several of the clubs in the west of the area covered by the Ribblesdale League had been unhappy for some time about the format of that League. The League had a membership of 18 clubs which meant that only 5 opponents in the League were played against twice per season whilst the remainder were played against once. This group of clubs met secretly on 7 October 1951 and produced a handwritten document which stated:

The following Ribblesdale League clubs:- Blackpool, Chorley, Darwen, Fleetwood, Lancaster, Leyland, Morecambe, St Annes being duly authorised by their respective Committees are resolved from this meeting to request the Ribblesdale League to form a West Section, comprising the above named clubs together with Leyland Motors, Furness and Kendal. Failing agreement on the part of the Ribblesdale League the above eight clubs pledge themselves to resign forthwith from the Ribblesdale League and to create a new league, which would include an invitation to Leyland Motors, Furness, Kendal and Preston.

At the AGM of the Ribblesdale League, held in Whalley on 10 November 1951, the motion was proposed to form West and East sections with the West section comprising Blackpool, Chorley, Darwen, Fleetwood, Lancaster, Leyland, Morecambe, and St Annes, plus two new clubs Furness and Kendal (both from the North Lancashire Cricket League) along with Leyland Motors if they wished to play in the West section. After discussion, the vote was 9–9 and was defeated on the casting vote of the President who had earlier expressed distaste at the way the western clubs had acted.

The eight clubs duly resigned from the Ribblesdale League, as did Leyland Motors, and representatives of these clubs along with those of Furness and Kendal then met at the Swan Hotel in Whalley where the Northern Cricket League was formed. Preston Cricket Club were invited to join the new league as the twelfth team. The invitation was accepted but they remained in the Liverpool and District Cricket Competition for one further year before participating in the Northern Cricket League's second season in 1953.

Furness left the league after the 1958 season to be replaced by Netherfield, but there were to be no further changes to the membership until Barrow joined the league in 2004. More recent changes in the membership can be seen below. Leyland merged with lower-level club BTR in 2000 and adopted the name Leyland and Farington, while Leyland Motors were known as Leyland DAF between 1991 and 2000. Founder members Darwen left the league after the 2016 season. In 2017 promotion and relegation was agreed between the Northern League and Palace Shield and at the end of the season Garstang and Fulwood & Broughton replaced Lancaster and Kendal. For the 2023 season, Fleetwood re-joined the Northern League as Palace Shield champions, alongside Palace Shield runners-up and Northern League newcomers Eccleston with Lancaster and Vernon Carus going in the opposition direction and both returning to the Palace Shield.

In 2024, changes were made to the competition which saw a coalition between the Northern Premier Cricket League (NCPL), the Palace Shield and the Westmorland Cricket League. It resulted in the NCPL becoming a two-division league, leaving the Palace Shield as an amateur competition and incorporating the Westmorland League into the pyramid in a more recognised fashion than previously. Division One and Division Two of the NCPL will have ten teams, as will the Palace Shield Premier Division.

== Winners ==
A list of the champions of the NPCL since 1952.

- Year	Champions
  1952	St Annes
  1953	Furness
  1954	Blackpool
  1955	Blackpool
  1956	Kendal
  1957	Lancaster
  1958	Furness
  1959	Kendal
  1960	Blackpool
  1961	Leyland
  1962	Blackpool
  1963	Blackpool
  1964	Blackpool
  1965	Blackpool
  1966	Darwen
  1967	Blackpool and Preston (Note: Joint champions.)
  1968	Morecambe
  1969	Blackpool
  1970	Preston
  1971	Chorley
- Year	Champions
  1972	Fleetwood
  1973	Leyland Motors
  1974	Blackpool
  1975	Fleetwood
  1976	Lancaster
  1977	Lancaster
  1978	Lancaster
  1979	Lancaster
  1980	Chorley
  1981	Leyland
  1982	Blackpool
  1983	Preston
  1984	Blackpool
  1985	Fleetwood
  1986	Lancaster
  1987	Darwen
  1988	Blackpool
  1989	Blackpool
  1990	Blackpool
  1991	Leyland
- Year	Champions
  1992	Morecambe
  1993	Kendal
  1994	Kendal
  1995	Morecambe
  1996	St Annes
  1997	Netherfield
  1998	Netherfield
  1999	Darwen
  2000	Netherfield
  2001	Netherfield
  2002	Darwen
  2003	Darwen
  2004	Fleetwood
  2005	St Annes
  2006	Morecambe
  2007	St Annes
  2008	Netherfield
  2009	St Annes
  2010	Leyland
  2011	St Annes
- Year	Champions
  2012	Fleetwood
  2013	Leyland
  2014	Blackpool
  2015	Morecambe
  2016	Leyland
  2017	Netherfield
  2018	Blackpool
  2019	Leyland
  2020	League suspended
  2021	Blackpool
  2022	Garstang
  2023	Kendal
  2024	Fleetwood
  2025	Kendal
  2026	Netherfield
- Wins	Club
  18	Blackpool (Note: Blackpool and Preston shared a championship in 1967.)
  7	Leyland
  7	Netherfield
  6	Fleetwood
  6	Kendal
  6	Lancaster
  6	St Annes
  5	Darwen
  5	Morecambe
  3	Preston
  2	Chorley
  2	Furness
  1	Garstang
  1	Leyland Motors

== Division One performance by season from 2000 ==
Key
Gold	Champions
Blue	Left League
Red	Relegated

Performance by season, from 2000
Club	2000	2001	2002	2003	2004	2005	2006	2007	2008	2009	2010	2011	2012	2013	2014	2015	2016	2017	2018	2019	2020	2021	2022	2023	2024	2025	2026
Barrow					11	8	12	9	9	6	2	8	2	2	5	7	4	10	7	12							
Blackpool	5	3	5	12	7	3	10	10	3	7	5	5	9	11	1	4	2	4	1	3		1	2	5	4	4	4
Carlisle																											5
Carnforth (Note: Carnforth left the league after the 2012 season to join the Westmorland Cricket League.)							9	12	11	12	12	11	14														
Chorley	3	2	6	7	5	9	13	11	7	3	14	3	13	7	12	9	5	5	5	7		10	6	2	8	6	8
Darwen (Note: Darwen left the league after the 2016 season to join the Lancashire League.)	2	5	1	1	3	4	3	3	8	11	4	7	7	10	3	3	11										
Eccleston																								12			
Euxton																									11		
Fleetwood	7	10	9	10	1	7	7	13	13	10	10	14	1	5	6	2	3	7	9	4		12		6	1	10	
Fulwood & Broughton																			10	5		8	3	10	7	9	
Garstang																			6	2		5	1	3	9	2	3
Kendal	8	4	4	4	6	5	2	4	2	8	11	9	4	8	7	12	8	11		10		6	9	1	5	1	6
Lancashire Colts (Note: Lancashire Colts withdrew from league cricket after the 2014 season.)											9	10	10	12	9												
Lancaster	9	12	11	8	12	13	5	8	12	13	7	12	11	3	14	10	13	12				2	11				
Leyland (Note: Leyland & Farington and Leyland Motors (Leyland DAF in 2000) merged under the name Leyland after the 2006 season.)								7	6	9	1	2	3	1	2	5	1	3	4	1		7	8	8	6	7	2
Leyland & Farington	10	9	10	11	13	11	14																				
Leyland Motors	11	11	12	9	10	10	11																				
Longridge																				6		4	7	4	2	8	7
Mawdesley																									13		
Morecambe	4	7	2	5	4	6	1	2	4	5	6	6	8	4	10	1	12	9	11			11					
Netherfield	1	1	3	3	2	2	4	6	1	4	8	4	5	9	8	8	6	1	2	8		3	5	7	3	3	1
Penrith															11	6	10	6	8	11			10	11			
Preston	12	8	8	6	8	12	8	5	10	2	13	13	6	13	13	13	7	8	12								
Settle																									10	5	10
St Annes	6	6	7	2	9	1	6	1	5	1	3	1	12	6	4	11	9	2	3	9		9	4	9	12		9
Vernon Carus																							12				
References																					(Note: Coronavirus pandemic forced all formal competitive sporting activities to be suspended.)						
