= Jawaharlal Navoday Vidhyalay Stadium =

Cricket ground in Una, Himachal Pradesh, India

Coordinates: 31°24′41.15″N 76°17′19.15″E

- Interactive map of Jawaharlal Navoday Vidhyalay Stadium

Ground information
- Location: near Una, India
- Country: India
- Establishment: 1991 (first recorded match)

Team information
| Himachal Pradesh | (1999 & 2009) |
- As of 29 October 2011; Source: Ground profile

Jawaharlal Navoday Vidhyalay Stadium is a cricket ground near Una, Himachal Pradesh, India. The first recorded match held on the ground came in January 1999 when Bengal Under-16s played Madhya Pradesh Under-16s. The ground later held a List A match in 1997 when Himachal Pradesh played the Services in the 1999/00 Ranji Trophy one-day competition. Following this match, a first-class match was played there between the two sides in the Ranji Trophy. Nearly ten years later the ground held five List A matches in the 2008/09 Vijay Hazare Trophy. During the competition the Services cricket team heavily criticised the grounds playing conditions, citing the outfield as bumpy and potentially dangerous. They also criticised its general facilities, including a lack of changing facilities, with both teams having to change in a partitioned tent.
