= Himachal Pradesh Cricket Association Stadium =

International cricket stadium in Dharamshala, Himachal Pradesh, India

Coordinates: 32.197672°N 76.325997°E

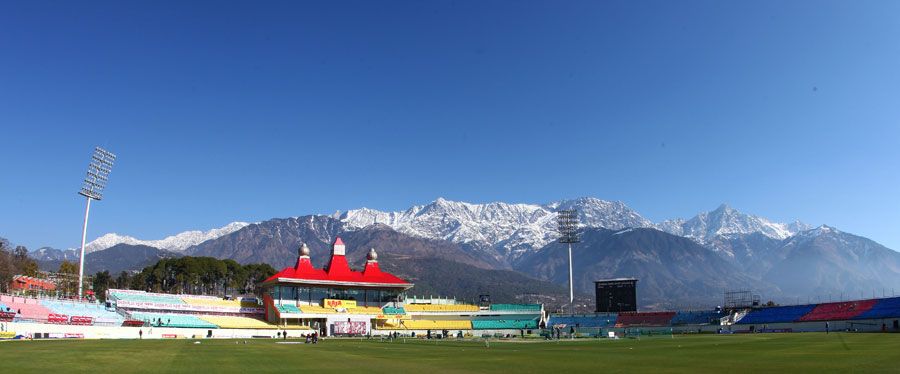
- Dhauladhar range in the backdrop of the HPCA Stadium.
- Interactive map of Himachal Pradesh Cricket Association Stadium

Ground information
- Location: Dharamshala, Kangra, Himachal Pradesh, India
- Country: India
- Home club: Himachal Pradesh cricket team Himachal Pradesh women's cricket team
- Establishment: 2003
- Capacity: 21,200
- Owner: Himachal Pradesh Cricket Association
- Operator: Himachal Pradesh Cricket Association
- Tenants: Indian cricket team Punjab Kings
- End names
- River End; College End

International information
- First men's Test: 25–29 March 2017: India v Australia
- Last men's Test: 7–9 March 2024: India v England
- First men's ODI: 27 January 2013: India v England
- Last men's ODI: 13 June 2026: India v Afghanistan
- First men's T20I: 2 October 2015: India v South Africa
- Last men's T20I: 14 December 2025: India v South Africa
- First women's T20I: 22 March 2016: India v England
- Last women's T20I: 24 March 2016: West Indies v England
- As of 9 March 2024; Source

Himachal Pradesh Cricket Association Stadium (abbreviated as the HPCA Stadium) is an international cricket stadium in Dharamshala hill station of Himachal Pradesh, India.

The stadium is the home ground of Himachal Pradesh cricket team, Himachal Pradesh women's cricket team and headquarters of Himachal Pradesh Cricket Association, the governing body of cricket in the state of Himachal Pradesh. It hosted 5 matches of the 2023 Cricket World Cup, including New Zealand v India. However the stadium was accused of having a bad outfield and players played with the potential risk of injury.

== Location and history ==
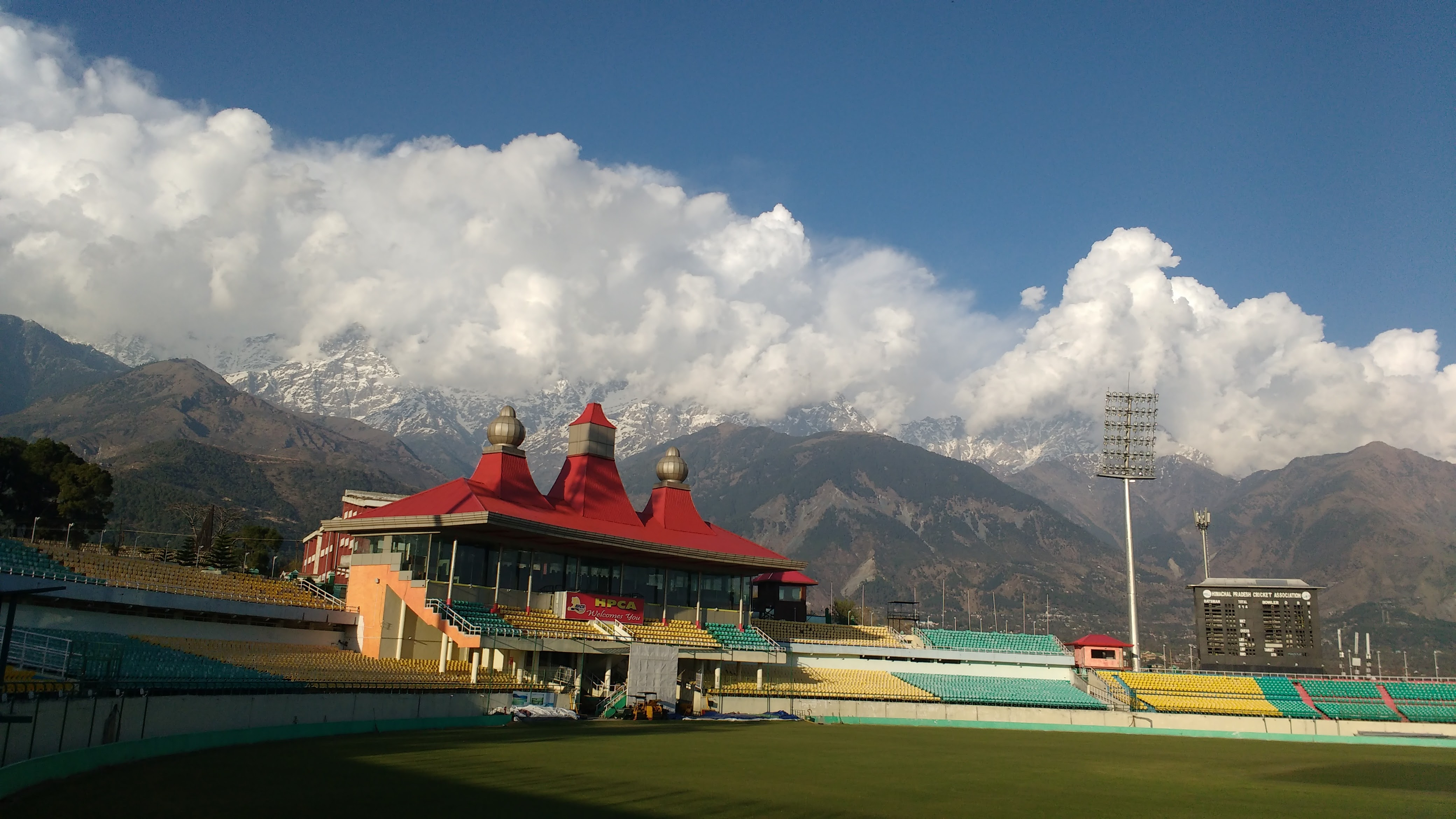
The snow-capped Himalayan mountains in the background

Earlier, the BCCI and state government had the plan to make International Stadium in Shimla. The location in Shimla proposed for this was Annadale. But despite every try the Army did not accept this, because Annadale is an Army Cantonment area and its ground serves as important strategic location for Army as well as for the ARTRAC Shimla. After the failure of this plan then it was shifted to Dharamshala, and then HPCA Stadium in Dharamshala was finally chosen.

The stadium served as the home ground for the Himachal Pradesh cricket team for Ranji Trophy matches and other domestic matches. The stadium also hosted some IPL matches as a home stadium for Punjab Kings.

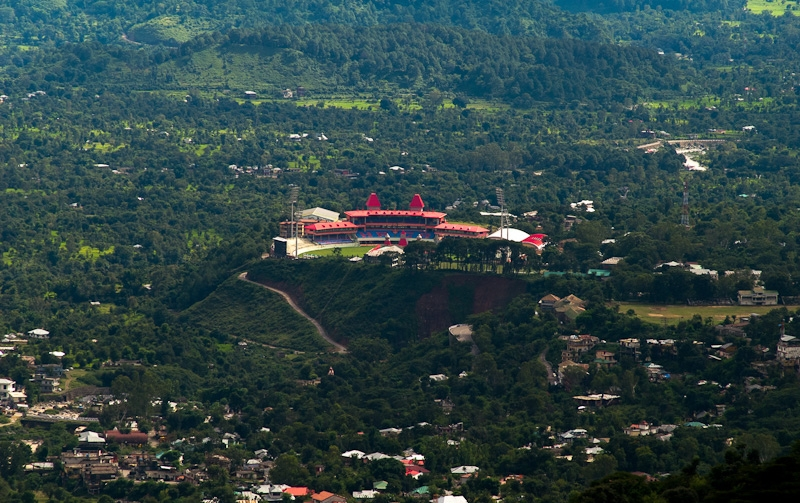
Remote view of the stadium from Triund trek.

The picturesque venue is unique in India as it is situated at an altitude of 1,457 m above sea level and has snow-capped Himalayan mountains in the background. Getting to Dharamsala from the nearby Kangra Airport, which is about 8 kilometres away through the hilly terrain and the harsh winters, during which it rains and snows, is a deterrent to organizing regular matches.

Dav Whatmore, the former Director of the National Cricket Academy in India had recommended during his tenure that the stadium is suitable for hosting international cricket matches. The first international team who played at this ground was the Pakistani cricket team, when they played a warm-up match against India A in 2005.

The first One Day International (ODI) at this stadium was played between India and England on 27 January 2013. England won the match by 7 wickets. The first Test at this stadium was played between India- Australia on 25–29 March 2017, India won the match.

In November 2015, the stadium was selected as one of the six new Test match venues in India along with the Maharashtra Cricket Association Stadium, JSCA International Stadium Complex, Saurashtra Cricket Association Stadium, Holkar Stadium and Dr. Y.S. Rajasekhara Reddy ACA-VDCA Cricket Stadium.

The venue has been used sporadically for IPL matches and due to its high altitude has a reputation for six hitting. Adam Gilchrist became the first player to score a century in the IPL at the HPCA stadium in 2011 against RCB, an innings that included a 122m six off Charl Langeveldt.

=== ACC Centre of Excellence ===
In December 2015, Asian Cricket Council decided to set up Centre of Excellence at Dharamshala.

=== 2016 ICC World Twenty20 ===
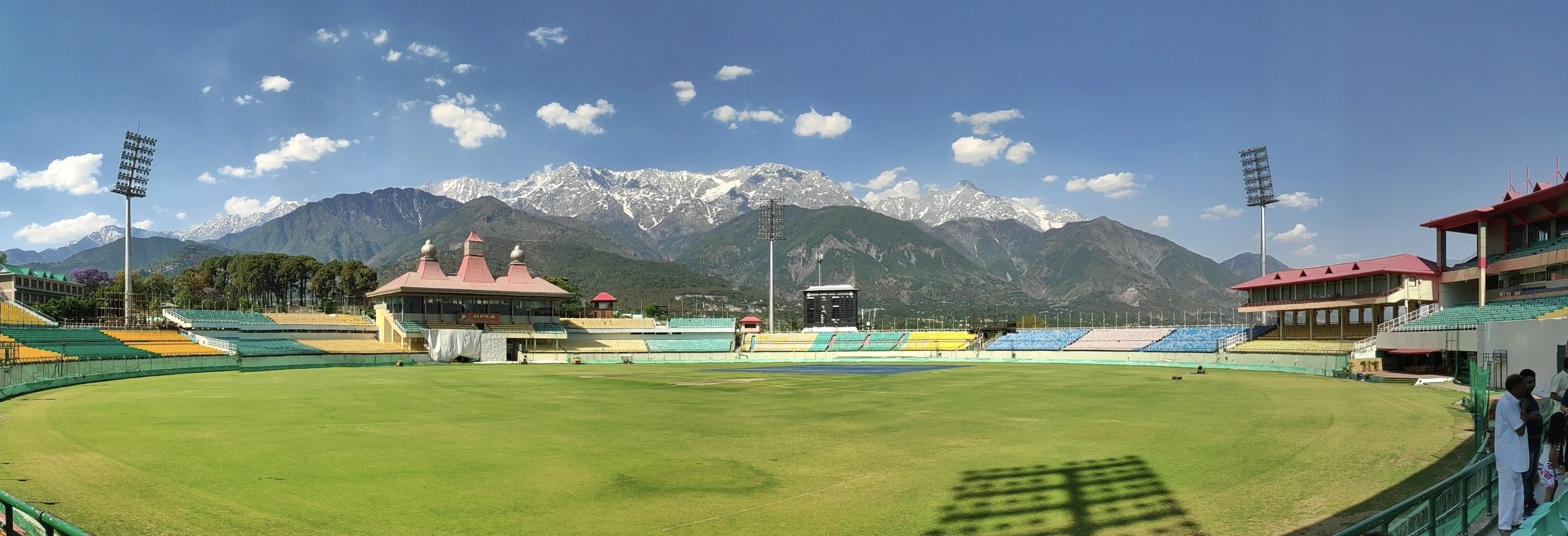
Panorama of the HPCA Stadium in Dharamsala

On 21 July 2015, the BCCI announced the names of the eight cities which would be hosting matches during the 2016 ICC World Twenty20. Dharamshala was announced as one of the eight venues for the event. On 11 December 2015, ICC announced the fixtures of the event where the HPCA Stadium was scheduled to host all the first round Group A matches and a single Super 10 Group 2 match. Originally the marquee India v Pakistan match was scheduled to be hosted by this venue. Due to security concerns for the Pakistani team, the match was moved to Eden Gardens, Kolkata.

=== 2023 ICC World Cup ===
ICC allocated 5 matches to the stadium, including New Zealand v India. However the Stadium was accused of bad outfield and players played with potential risk of being injured.

== Records and statistics ==
=== List of centuries ===
==== Tests ====
No.	Score	Player	Team	Balls	Inns.	Opposing team	Date
1	111	Steve Smith	Australia	173	1	India	25 March 2017
2	103	Rohit Sharma	India	162	2	England	7 March 2024
3	110	Shubman Gill	India	150	2	England	7 March 2024

==== ODIs ====
No.	Score	Player	Team	Balls	Inns.	Opposing team	Date	Result
1	113*	Ian Bell	England	143	2	India	27 January 2013	Won
2	127	Virat Kohli	India	114	1	West Indies	17 October 2014	Won
3	112	Marlon Samuels	West Indies	103	2	India	17 October 2014	Lost
4	140	Dawid Malan	England	107	1	Bangladesh	10 October 2023	Won
5	130	Daryl Mitchell	New Zealand	127	1	India	22 October 2023	Lost
6	109	Travis Head	Australia	67	1	New Zealand	28 October 2023	Won
7	116	Rachin Ravindra	New Zealand	89	2	Australia	28 October 2023	Lost
8	102	Rahmanullah Gurbaz	Afghanistan	51	1	India	13 June 2026	Lost

==== T20Is ====
No.	Score	Player	Team	Balls	Inns.	Opposing team	Date	Result
1	106	Rohit Sharma	India	66	1	South Africa	2 October 2015	Lost
2	103*	Tamim Iqbal	Bangladesh	63	1	Oman	13 March 2016	Won

=== List of five wicket hauls ===
==== Tests ====
No.	Bowler	Date	Team	Opposing Team	Inn	O	R	W	Result
1	Nathan Lyon	25 March 2017	Australia	India	2	34.1	92	5	Lost
2	Kuldeep Yadav	7 March 2024	India	England	1	15	72	5	Won
3	Shoaib Bashir	7 March 2024	England	India	2	46.1	173	5	Lost
4	Ravichandran Ashwin	7 March 2024	India	England	3	14	77	5	Won
