= Scott Hookey =

Australian cricketer and businessman

Personal information
- Full name: Scott Gregory Hookey
- Born: 10 February 1967 (age 59); Sydney, New South Wales, Australia
- Batting: Left-handed

Domestic team information
- Years: Team
- 1987/88: New South Wales
- 1989/90–1991/92: Tasmania
- 1994/95: New South Wales

Career statistics
Competition	First-class	List A
Matches	9	9
Runs scored	436	227
Batting average	27.25	25.22
100s/50s	1/1	0/2
Top score	116*	77
Catches/stumpings	1/–	4/–
- Source: CricketArchive, 18 August 2010

Scott Gregory Hookey (born 10 February 1967) is an Australian former cricketer who played for the Tasmanian Tigers and the New South Wales Blues. He was a left-handed batsman who played interstate cricket from 1987 until 1995. He also played as a professional for Hyde CC in the Central Lancashire League in 1989 and for Darwen CC in the Northern League in 1988, 1990, and 1991.

Following his cricket career, Hookey pursued business ventures, primarily in childcare development, but later faced financial and legal difficulties, leading to bankruptcy in 2023 .

== Legal Disputes and Financial Challenges ==
In Hookey v Whitelaw [2020] QSC 63, the Queensland Supreme Court dismissed Hookey's claims regarding an alleged oral joint venture agreement related to the development and operation of a childcare centre. The court found that no binding agreement was formed prior to 1 July 2014, and Hookey's conduct thereafter was inconsistent with the existence of such an agreement. Several key findings undermined Hookey's claims:

- Hookey participated in negotiations in November 2014 on terms that were inconsistent with the alleged agreement.
- On 12 February 2016, Hookey registered a lease and later mortgaged it to secure financing.
- Hookey accepted $1 million from Mr. Whitelaw in 2016 as reimbursement for preliminary expenses, despite no sale of the business or land, contrary to the alleged joint venture terms.
- Irregularities were identified in Hookey's financial management, including the diversion of $497,699.16 from Kids Academy's bank accounts for personal use, with no explanation for a $48,247.28 shortfall. He also used the company's superannuation and tax accounts for personal expenses.
- Profits from the business were distributed entirely to Hookey's trust, rather than shared equally as purportedly agreed.

The court concluded that Hookey's conduct after 1 July 2014 reflected adjustments to the relationship due to changing circumstances—such as Westpac's requirement that Mr. Whitelaw be the sole borrower and landlord—rather than proof of any binding joint venture agreement.

== Financial Troubles and Bankruptcy ==
On 12 April 2022, the Fair Work Ombudsman secured a $45,000 penalty against Kids Academy Hope Island Pty Ltd, a company that formerly operated a childcare centre under Hookey's Kids Academy brand. The penalty was imposed for the company's failure to comply with Compliance Notices requiring back-payment of entitlements to 38 workers before its closure in 2020. The court ordered the company to back-pay 37 workers a total of $250,290.35 in redundancy entitlements and rectify underpayments for another worker owed pay in lieu of termination notice.

In 2023, Hookey was declared bankrupt with debts totaling A$10 million. His financial troubles extended to the forced sale of his luxury beachfront penthouse on the Gold Coast in 2024. The property was seized by creditors and sold at a significantly reduced price in a fire sale, highlighting the extent of his financial collapse.
