= Paramount Cricket Promotion Association Stadium =

Cricket stadium in Santokhgarh, India

PCPA Stadium
- PCPA
- Interactive map of PCPA Stadium
- Location: PCPA Stadium Santokhghar
- Country: India
- Coordinates: 31.36114°N 76.29979°E
- Establishment: 2012
- Operator: Paramount Cricket Promotion Association
- Tenants: Punjab - Himachal cricket teams

PCPA Stadium (Paramount Cricket Promotion Association Stadium) is a cricket stadium located in the city of Santokhgarh in Himachal Pradesh. The stadium is home to Punjab, Himachal cricket teams matches and Cricket Coaching. It has large practice area, net pitches, cemented pitches and large cricket stadium and provides the different playing environment.

== PCPA Features ==
- India's largest practice area
- Largest cricket ground with International Standards
- Different kind of pitches such as grassy pitches, cemented pitches and hard pitches
- Advance training techniques and equipments
- Best cricket and fitness coaches
- Yoga classes
