= Blackpool Cricket Club =

Stanley Park
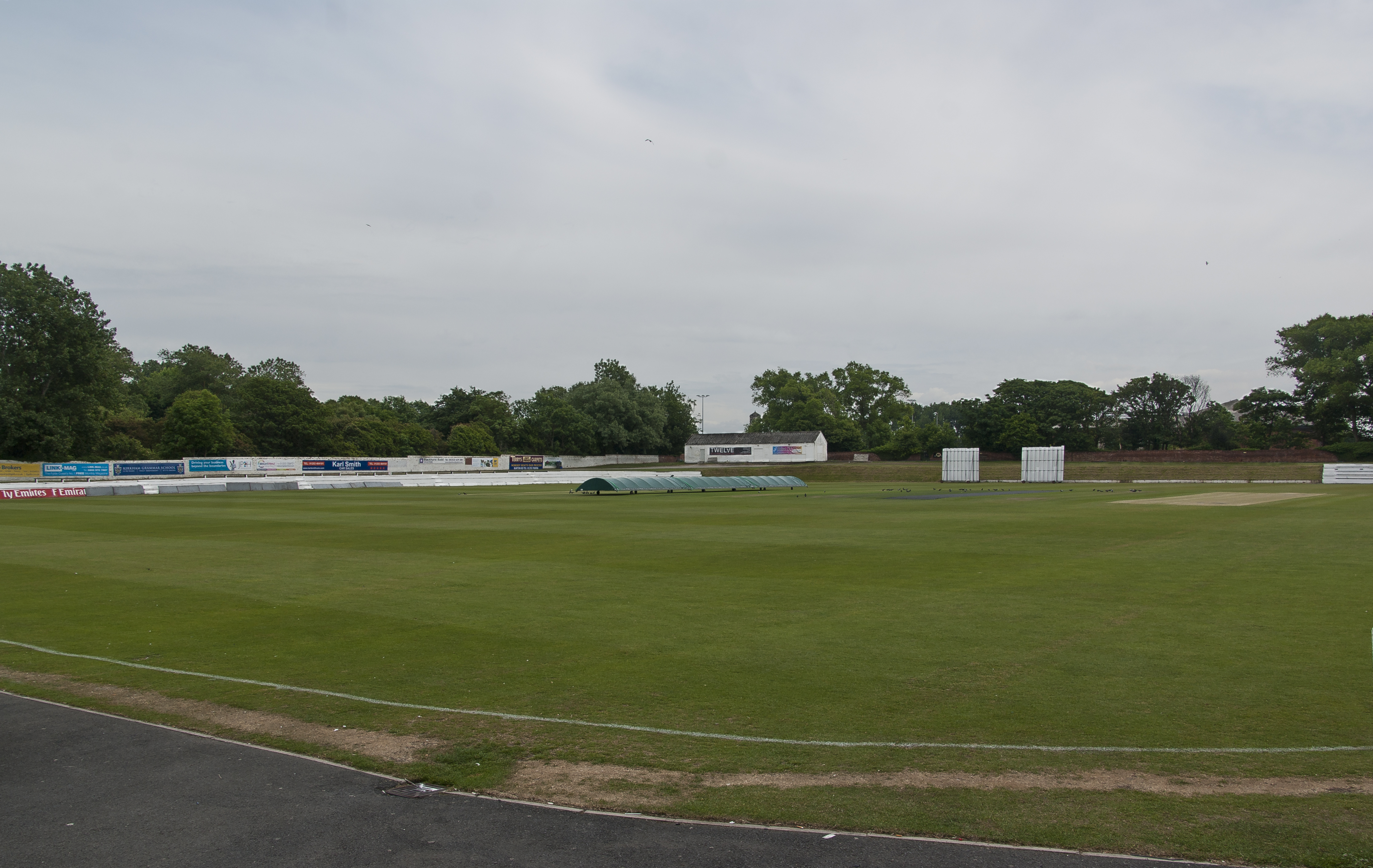

Ground information
- Location: Blackpool, Lancashire
- Country: England
- Establishment: 1893
- Capacity: 5,000
- End names
- Pavilion End; Nursery End

International information
- First women's Test: 26–30 June 1937: England v Australia
- Last women's Test: 3–7 July 1986: England v India
- First women's ODI: 26 August 2007: England v New Zealand
- Last women's ODI: 27 August 2007: England v New Zealand

Team information
| Lancashire | (1874–present) |
- As of 5 September 2020; Source: Ground profile

Blackpool Cricket Club is a cricket club based in Stanley Park, in Blackpool, Lancashire. Located in western quadrant of the park, the club plays at a 5,000-seater ground, which is regularly used for county cricket matches by Lancashire.

The club's 1st and 2nd XI play in the ECB Northern Premier League while its 3rd XI and Sunday Development XI turn out in the Palace Shield, and its 4th XI in the Fylde League. Its players include first-class cricketer Steven Croft.

== Raikes Hall ==
Blackpool Cricket Club first formed in 1888 and they regularly played at Raikes Hall pleasure gardens. In 1889, R.G. Barlow organised the All England XI to play at the site against the Blackpool team.

== Whitegate Park ==
Due to repairs being needed at the Raikes Hall site in 1893, the Blackpool Athletic Ground Company decided to give the club a more permanent home at what was known as the Athletic Grounds, which was more or less on the site of the present Stanley Park ground. The new ground covered an area of 150yds by 130yds. The first recorded match the playing of which officially opened the ground was in 1893, when XVIII of Blackpool played the touring Australians, who were on their Ashes tour. After the first Blackpool Cricket Festival in 1904, when the two games played were not considered first-class, the inaugural first-class match to be played on the ground was between the North and the South in the 1905 North v South Cricket Festival week. Lancashire also played their first first-class match on the ground in that Festival Week of 1905 when they played against an England XI. From 1905 to the present day, the club's ground has played host to 98 first-class matches, the last of which came in the 2008 County Championship between Lancashire and Surrey. I The AThletic Ground Company went bankrupt in the early part of the 20th century and the ground became unofficially known as Whitegate Park, because there was no such park as Whitegate Park. The site then no longer hosted other sports, which it originally had done with athletics, cycling and trotting, and when Stanley Park was developed the ground became an integral part of that park.

== Stanley Park ==
When the development of the park was completed In 1925, the ground was officially renamed 'Stanley Park' as it sat within the boundary of the new park and it continued to be the home of Blackpool Cricket Club. Sir Lindsay Parkinson donated the ground, valued at £10,000 to the club and it was, and still is, managed by Blackpool Cricket Club and the deeds are held in trust by the mayor. The Blackpool club played in the Ribblesdale League until 1952 when it became one of the funding members of the Northern Cricket League, later the Northern Premier League and now the Northern Pyramid Cricket Competition. Blackpool were regular winners of the respective Leagues and have also won the National Club Cricket Championship in 1990 and the Lancashire Cup on various occasions.

== Former players ==
Many professionals have played at the club including: Peter Fairclough, Harold Larwood (played in 1939), Jim Parks, Bill Alley, Hanif Mohammad, Rohan Kanhai, Cammie Smith, Mushtaq Mohammad, Collis King, Maninder Singh, Richie Richardson and Blackpool-born Steven Croft, who played as an amateur before joining Lancashire County Cricket Club, has occasionally returned as professional. In addition former first-class cricketers Cecil Parkin, Ted McDonald, Stewie Dempster, and Ken James played for the club as amateurs at various times and the likes of Arthur Shrewsbury, Johnny Briggs and a whole host of others played in Blackpool when the club's ground was still at Raikes Hall Pleasure Gardens. These players featured for RG Barlow's XI in non-first-class games that Barlow arranged from 1889 through to the early 1890s.
