= Lancaster Cricket Club =

English cricket team

Lancaster Cricket Club is an English cricket club sited near the River Lune in Lancaster. The club compete in the Northern League, with the 1st team being allocated a named professional for each season. Previous professionals include South African international wicket-keeper, Mark Boucher, Durham spinner Gareth Breese and West Indies international Laurie Williams.

In 2017, the team finished bottom of the Northern League and dropped down into the Palace Shield Premier Division for the 2018 season.
