= West Cliff, Preston =

Cricket ground in England

Coordinates: 53.75168°N 2.70877°W

West Cliff
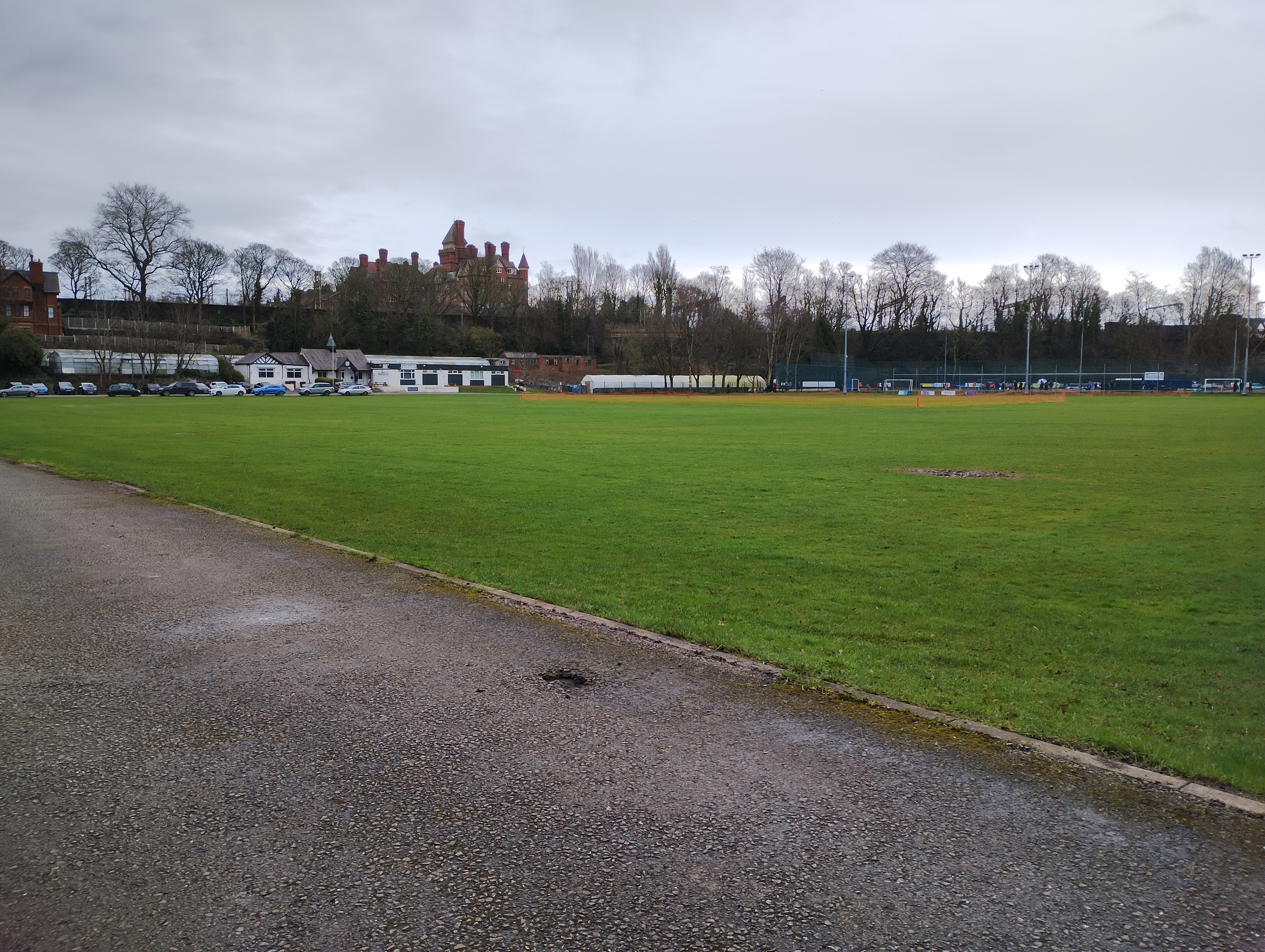
- Interactive map of West Cliff

Ground information
- Location: Preston, Lancashire
- Country: England
- Establishment: 1831
- End names
- https://www.lancashiretelegraph.co.uk/news/5897448.scandal-revealed-history-preston-cc/

Team information
Lancashire	(1936–1939 & 1952)
- As of 4 September 2010; Source: profile

West Cliff is a cricket ground in Preston, Lancashire. The first recorded match on the ground was in 1870, when Preston played a United North of England Eleven.

In 1936, the ground held its first first-class match when Lancashire played Gloucestershire. From 1936 to 1939, the ground played host to 4 first-class matches involving Lancashire, the last of which saw them play Glamorgan. In 1952, Lancashire returned to the ground where they played a single first-class match against Glamorgan.

The ground has also played host to a combined total of 15 Second XI fixtures for the Lancashire Second XI in the Minor Counties Championship, Second XI Championship and Second XI Trophy.

Still in use to this day, in local domestic cricket the ground is the home venue of Preston Cricket Club who play in the Palace Shield.
