= MRF Pachyappas Ground =

Multi purpose stadium in Chennai, India

- Full name: MRF Pachyappas Ground
- Former names: Pachaiyappa College Ground
- Location: Chennai, Tamil Nadu
- Owner: Pachaiyappa's College
- Operator: Pachaiyappa's College
- Capacity: 5,000

Construction
- Groundbreaking: 1971
- Opened: 1971

Website
- ESPNcricinfo

Pachaiyappa College Ground or MRF Pachyappas Ground is a multi purpose stadium in Chennai, Tamil Nadu. The ground is mainly used for organizing matches of football, cricket and other sports. The ground was established in 1971 when Annamalai University played against Nagpur University

The stadium has hosted nine Vijay Hazare Trophy matches from 1964 when Andhra cricket team played against Kerala cricket team until 2010 but since then the stadium has hosted non-first-class matches.
