= Morecambe Cricket Club =

English cricket club

Morecambe Cricket Club is an English cricket club based in the tourist resort of Morecambe, Lancashire. The club plays its home matches at Woodhill Lane in the Northern League. The town was founded in 1889 and Morecambe CC is by far the oldest sporting club in it.

The club runs Five Senior teams, the 1st team plays in the Northern Premier Cricket League. The 2nd team play in the Westmorland Cricket League 1st Division, the 3rd team competes in the Westmorland League as does the 4th team. There is also a women's team who compete in the Northern Pyramid Super 8's.

The club won the Northern Premier League for the sixth time in 2015.

In recent years the 1st team have the Meyler Cup twice including in 2025.

The club also runs a number of junior teams, varying in age ranges and they all compete against local sides.
