= Josh Marquet =

Australian cricketer (born 1969)

Personal information
- Full name: Joshua Phillip Marquet
- Born: 3 December 1969 (age 56); Melbourne, Victoria, Australia
- Batting: Right-handed
- Bowling: Right-arm fast
- Role: Bowler

Domestic team information
- Years: Team
- 1994/95–2001/02: Tasmania
- 2003: Norfolk

Career statistics
Competition	First-class	List A
Matches	22	18
Runs scored	28	11
Batting average	3.11	2.75
100s/50s	0/0	0/0
Top score	10	6
Balls bowled	4,345	982
Wickets	60	28
Bowling average	42.48	27.42
5 wickets in innings	1	1
10 wickets in match	0	0
Best bowling	5/94	5/23
Catches/stumpings	9/–	4/–
- Source: CricketArchive, 16 August 2010

Joshua Phillip Marquet (born 3 December 1969) is an Australian former cricketer, who played for Tasmania.

Marquet was a sharpish fast bowler, debuting in the 1994–95 season, who opened the Tasmanian bowling attack in the late 1990s, but often proved expensive, and as a result, failed to hold down a regular berth in the side. He bowled well with the breeze from the River Derwent at his back, but was often inconsistent. He fared slightly better in domestic one-day cricket, but retired in 2004.
