= Siddhesh Lad =

Indian cricketer (born 1992)

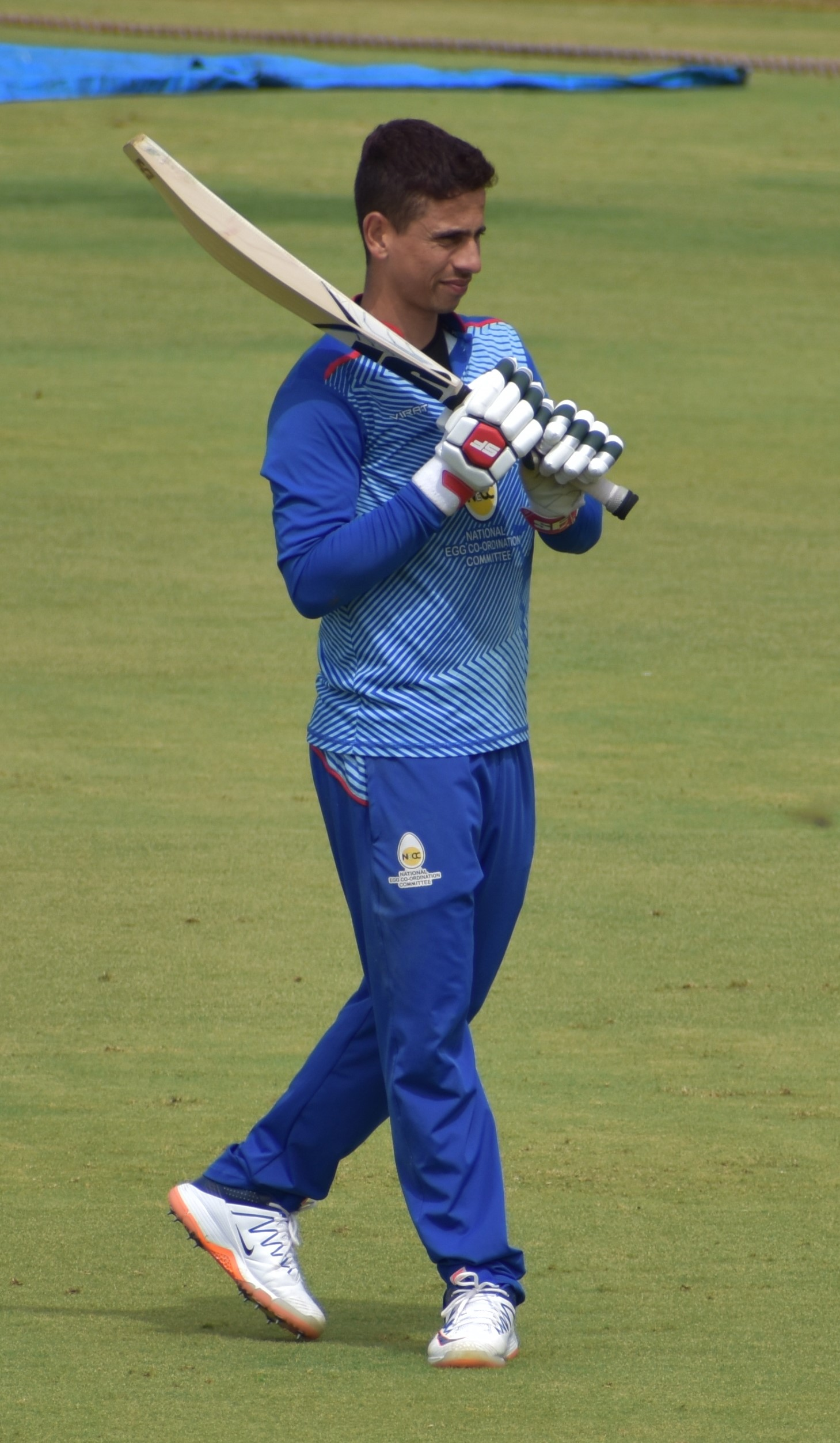
- Lad during the 2019–20 Vijay Hazare Trophy

Personal information
- Full name: Siddhesh Dinesh Lad
- Born: 23 May 1992 (age 34); Mumbai, Maharashtra, India
- Nickname: Sidd
- Height: 5 ft 6 in (1.68 m)
- Batting: Right-handed
- Bowling: Right-arm off break
- Role: Batsman

Domestic team information
- Years: Team
- 2013–2021: Mumbai
- 2019: Mumbai Indians
- 2022/23: Goa

Career statistics
Competition	FC	LA	T20
Matches	56	38	44
Runs scored	3,914	1,124	703
Batting average	41.63	43.23	26.03
100s/50s	8/25	4/3	0/3
Top score	150	129	82
Balls bowled	664	283	324
Wickets	5	9	18
Bowling average	81.60	27.11	21.50
5 wickets in innings	0	0	1
10 wickets in match	0	0	0
Best bowling	1/4	2/16	5/13
Catches/stumpings	24/–	11/–	17/–
- Source: ESPNcricinfo, 5 January 2020

Siddhesh Dinesh Lad (born 23 May 1992) is a cricketer who played for Mumbai and Goa in Indian domestic cricket. He is a right-hand batsman and occasional right arm off break bowler.

Lad was the captain of the Western Wolves team in the Toyota University Cricket Championship (UCC). His father, Dinesh Lad, is the coach of Indian international batsman Rohit Sharma. In the 2015 Indian Premier League, he was selected to play for the Mumbai Indians. In January 2018, he was bought by the Mumbai Indians in the 2018 IPL auction. On 10 April 2019, he finally made IPL debut for Mumbai Indians against Kings XI Punjab in 2019 Indian Premier League replacing the injured Rohit Sharma. He hit a six off the first ball he faced in his IPL career scoring 15 runs in the match before being dismissed. In November 2019 Kolkata Knight Riders have included him for IPL 2020

He was the leading run-scorer for Mumbai in the 2017–18 Ranji Trophy, with 652 runs in seven matches.

In August 2018, Lad was released from his squad in the Quadrangular Series and added to India Red's team for the second match of the 2018–19 Duleep Trophy. In the match, he scored a half-century in each innings, and was named the man of the match, as India Red progressed to the final.

In November 2018, he scored his 3,000th run in first-class cricket, batting for Mumbai against Railways in the 2018–19 Ranji Trophy. He was the leading run-scorer for Mumbai in the tournament, with 652 runs in seven matches.

In August 2019, he was named in the India Green team's squad for the 2019–20 Duleep Trophy.

In the 2020 IPL Auction he was bought by Kolkata Knight Riders for 2020 Indian Premier League but didn't play single match.

In April 2021, he signed as professional for Chorley Cricket Club.

17 April 2021, Siddhesh Lad made his Chorley Cricket Club debut playing away at Kendal Cricket Club. Lad bowled 11.4 overs 1 wicket for 31 runs, he also scored 54 off 90 balls hitting 5 x 4's & 1 x 6 (See Scorecard https://chorley.play-cricket.com/website/results/4584817)

Siddhesh Lad was professional at Darwen CC in 2022, helping the club win their first Lancashire League title. Lad hit 765 league runs at 81.2, seeing his side home in 7 run chases. He also picked up 26 wickets at 18.3.
