= Luhnu Cricket Ground =

Cricket ground in Bilaspur, India

Coordinates: 31°20′47.95″N 76°45′19.56″E

- Interactive map of Luhnu Cricket Ground

Ground information
- Location: Bilaspur, India
- Country: India
- Establishment: 1999 (first recorded match)

Team information
| Himachal Pradesh | (2001–2002) |
- As of 21 October 2011; Source: Ground profile

Luhnu Cricket Ground is a cricket ground in Bilaspur, Himachal Pradesh, India. The first recorded match on the ground came when Himachal Pradesh Under-16s played Jammu and Kashmir Under-16s in 1999. The ground held its first first-class match in 2001 when Himachal Pradesh played Delhi in the 2001/02 Ranji Trophy. The following season a further first-class match was held when Himachal Pradesh played Hyderabad in the 2002/03 Ranji Trophy. No further major matches have been staged there.
