= Atal Bihari Vajpayee Stadium =

Cricket stadium in Nadaun, Himachal Pradesh, India

Coordinates: 31°47′03.31″N 76°21′30.98″E

- Amtar Ground, Nadaun Stadium
- Interactive map of Atal Bihari Vajpayee Stadium

Ground information
- Location: Nadaun, Himachal Pradesh, India
- Country: India

Team information
| Himachal Pradesh cricket team | (2005) |
- As of 6 November 2018; Source: ESPNcricinfo

Atal Bihari Vajpayee Stadium or Nadaun Stadium or Amtar Ground is a cricket stadium in Nadaun, Himachal Pradesh, India. The ground first held a List A match in January 2005 when Himachal Pradesh played the Services in the 2004/05 Ranji Trophy one-day competition.

The ground has held four List A matches, the last of which came in the same competition and saw Haryana played Jammu and Kashmir, though the match itself was abandoned without a ball bowled due to rain.
