= Palace Shield =

Cricket league in Preston, England

The Palace Shield, officially known as the MHA Palace Shield for sponsorship reasons, is a cricket competition based in Preston and surrounding districts in Lancashire, England. There are eight divisions in the main Saturday competition, three Sunday leagues, a Twenty20 competition and a junior competition.

Test cricketers such as Andrew Flintoff and Simon Kerrigan began their careers in the Palace Shield, although it remains a competition for amateurs only. Richard Gleeson who played One Day International and Twenty20 Cricket for England Cricket Team also played in the competition.

In 2024, changes were made to the competition which saw a coalition between the Northern Premier Cricket League (NCPL), the Palace Shield and the Westmorland Cricket League. It resulted in the NCPL becoming a two-division league, leaving the Palace Shield as an amateur competition and incorporating the Westmorland League into the pyramid in a more recognised fashion than previously. Division One and Division Two of the NCPL will have ten teams, as will the Palace Shield Premier Division.

== Clubs ==
Teams for the 2025 season:

=== Palace Shield Premier Division (12 teams) ===
- Burneside
- Eccleston
- Fylde
- Heysham
- Lancaster
- Kirkham & Wesham
- Morecambe
- Penrith
- Preston
- Rufford
- Torrisholme
- Westgate

=== Northern Premier Cricket League Division One (10 teams) ===
- Blackpool
- Chorley
- Fleetwood
- Fulwood & Broughton
- Garstang
- Kendal
- Leyland
- Longridge
- Netherfield
- Settle

=== Northern Premier Cricket League Division Two (10 teams) ===
- Barrow
- Carlisle
- Carnforth
- Euxton
- Great Eccleston
- Mawdesley
- Penwortham
- St Annes
- Thornton-Cleveleys
- Vernon Carus
