= 2017–18 Vijay Hazare Trophy =

Indian cricket tournament

- Dates: 5 – 27 February 2018
- Administrator: BCCI
- Cricket format: List A cricket
- Tournament format(s): Round-robin and Playoff format
- Host: Various
- Champions: Karnataka (3rd title)
- Runners-up: Saurashtra
- Participants: 28
- Matches: 91
- Most runs: Mayank Agarwal (723) (Karnataka)
- Most wickets: Mohammed Siraj (23) (Hyderabad)

The 2017–18 Vijay Hazare Trophy was the 25th edition of the Vijay Hazare Trophy, an annual List A cricket tournament in India. It was held between 5 and 27 February 2018. Tamil Nadu were the defending champions. In December 2017, the fixtures were brought forward to allow players to practice ahead of the 2018 Indian Premier League.

Following the conclusion of the group stages, Baroda and Karnataka from Group A, Maharashtra and Delhi from Group B, Andhra and Mumbai from Group C, and Hyderabad and Saurashtra from Group D had progressed to the knockout stage of the competition.

On the first day of quarter-final matches, Karnataka beat Hyderabad by 103 runs and Maharashtra beat Mumbai by 7 wickets to advance to the semi-finals. In the other two quarter-finals, Saurashtra beat Baroda by 3 wickets and Andhra beat Delhi by 6 wickets to progress. It was the first time that Andhra had reached the semi-finals of the Vijay Hazare Trophy.

In the first semi-final, Karnataka beat Maharashtra by 9 wickets to advance to the final. In the second semi-final, Saurashtra beat Andhra by 59 runs to progress. In the final, Karnataka beat Saurashtra by 41 runs to win the tournament. Karnataka's Mayank Agarwal scored 723 runs during the tournament and scored 2,141 runs across all formats, the highest total by any batsman in an Indian domestic season.

== Teams ==
The teams were drawn in the following groups:

Group A

- Assam
- Baroda
- Haryana
- Karnataka
- Odisha
- Punjab
- Railways

Group B

- Bengal
- Delhi
- Himachal Pradesh
- Kerala
- Maharashtra
- Tripura
- Uttar Pradesh

Group C

- Andhra
- Goa
- Gujarat
- Madhya Pradesh
- Mumbai
- Rajasthan
- Tamil Nadu

Group D

- Chhattisgarh
- Hyderabad
- Jammu & Kashmir
- Jharkhand
- Saurashtra
- Services
- Vidarbha

== Group A ==
Points table

Pos	Team	Pld	W	L	T	NR	Pts	NRR
1	Baroda	6	5	1	0	0	20	2.012
2	Karnataka	6	4	1	0	1	18	1.489
3	Punjab	6	3	3	0	0	12	0.473
4	Odisha	6	3	3	0	0	12	−0.224
5	Railways	6	3	3	0	0	12	−0.444
6	Haryana	6	2	3	0	1	10	−0.426
7	Assam	6	0	6	0	0	0	−2.401

- Top two teams advanced to the knockout stage

== Group B ==
Points table

Pos	Team	Pld	W	L	T	NR	Pts	NRR
1	Maharashtra	6	4	1	0	1	18	0.878
2	Delhi	6	4	2	0	0	16	0.727
3	Kerala	6	3	2	1	0	14	0.288
4	Himachal Pradesh	6	3	2	0	1	14	−0.108
5	Uttar Pradesh	6	3	3	0	0	12	−0.563
6	Bengal	6	2	3	1	0	10	0.007
7	Tripura	6	0	6	0	0	0	−1.127

- Top two teams advanced to the knockout stage

== Group C ==
Points table

Pos	Team	Pld	W	L	T	NR	Pts	NRR
1	Andhra	6	6	0	0	0	24	0.626
2	Mumbai	6	4	2	0	0	16	0.324
3	Madhya Pradesh	6	3	3	0	0	12	0.112
4	Goa	6	3	3	0	0	12	−0.411
5	Tamil Nadu	6	2	4	0	0	8	0.468
6	Rajasthan	6	2	4	0	0	8	−0.791
7	Gujarat	6	1	5	0	0	4	−0.321

- Top two teams advanced to the knockout stage

== Group D ==
Points table

Pos	Team	Pld	W	L	T	NR	Pts	NRR
1	Hyderabad	6	5	1	0	0	20	0.646
2	Saurashtra	6	4	2	0	0	16	1.017
3	Vidarbha	6	4	2	0	0	16	0.718
4	Chhattisgarh	6	4	2	0	0	16	−0.103
5	Jharkhand	6	2	4	0	0	8	0.325
6	Jammu & Kashmir	6	2	4	0	0	8	−1.040
7	Services	6	0	6	0	0	0	−1.508

- Top two teams advanced to the knockout stage

== Knockout stage ==
Quarterfinals
D1	Hyderabad	244 (42.5 overs)
A2	Karnataka	347/8 (50 overs)
C2	Mumbai	222/9 (50 overs)
B1	Maharashtra	224/3 (46.5 overs)
A1	Baroda	247/8 (50 overs)
D2	Saurashtra	251/7 (48.4 overs)
C1	Andhra	112/4 (28.4 overs)
B2	Delhi	111 (32.1 overs)

Semifinals
A2	Karnataka	164/1 (30.3 overs)
B1	Maharashtra	160 (44.3 overs)
D2	Saurashtra	255 (49.1 overs)
C1	Andhra	196 (45.3 overs)

Final
A2	Karnataka	253 (45.5 overs)
D2	Saurashtra	212 (46.3 overs)

=== Quarter-finals ===
1st Quarter-final
21 February 2018
Scorecard

Karnataka; 347/8 (50 overs)	v	Hyderabad; 244 (42.5 overs)
Mayank Agarwal 140 (111); Mohammed Siraj 5/59 (10 overs)		Ambati Rayudu 64 (62); Shreyas Gopal 5/31 (6.5 overs)

Karnataka won by 103 runs
Feroz Shah Kotla, Delhi
Umpires: Anil Chaudhary and Virender Sharma

- Karnataka won the toss and elected to bat.
- Tanay Thyagarajan (Hyderabad) made his List A debut.

2nd Quarter-final
21 February 2018
Scorecard

Mumbai; 222/9 (50 overs)	v	Maharashtra; 224/3 (46.5 overs)
Suryakumar Yadav 69 (88); Pradeep Dadhe 3/57 (10 overs)		Shrikant Mundhe 70 (95); Shivam Malhotra 1/29 (6 overs)

Maharashtra won by 7 wickets
Palam A Ground, Model Sports Complex, Delhi
Umpires: Nitin Menon and Nitin Pandit

- Mumbai won the toss and elected to bat.
- Prashant Kore (Maharashtra) made his List A debut.

3rd Quarter-final
22 February 2018
Scorecard

Baroda; 247/8 (50 overs)	v	Saurashtra; 251/7 (48.4 overs)
Soaeb Tai 72* (91); Chirag Jani 4/35 (10 overs)		Avi Barot 82 (105); Atit Sheth 3/38 (9.4 overs)

Saurashtra won by 3 wickets
Feroz Shah Kotla, Delhi
Umpires: Anil Chaudhary and Navdeep Singh

- Saurashtra won the toss and elected to field.
- Chetan Sakariya (Saurashtra) made his List A debut.

4th Quarter-final
22 February 2018
Scorecard

Delhi; 111 (32.1 overs)	v	Andhra; 112/4 (28.4 overs)
Rishabh Pant 38 (46); Siva Kumar 4/29 (10 overs)		Ashwin Hebbar 38 (66); Ishant Sharma 1/11 (4 overs)

Andhra won by 6 wickets
Palam A Ground, Model Sports Complex, Delhi
Umpires: Nitin Pandit and Nitin Menon

- Andhra won the toss and elected to field.
- Match reduced to 49 overs per side.

=== Semi-finals ===
1st Semi-final
24 February 2018
Scorecard

Maharashtra; 160 (44.3 overs)	v	Karnataka; 164/1 (30.3 overs)
Shrikant Mundhe 50 (77); Krishnappa Gowtham 3/26 (10 overs)		Mayank Agarwal 81 (86); Satyajeet Bachhav 1/32 (9.3 overs)

Karnataka won by 9 wickets
Feroz Shah Kotla, Delhi
Umpires: Nitin Menon and Virender Sharma

- Maharashtra won the toss and elected to bat.

2nd Semi-final
25 February 2018
Scorecard

Saurashtra; 255 (49.1 overs)	v	Andhra; 196 (45.3 overs)
Arpit Vasavada 58 (59); Karthik Raman 4/69 (9.1 overs)		Dwaraka Ravi Teja 42 (53); Dharmendrasinh Jadeja 4/40 (10 overs)

Saurashtra won by 59 runs
Feroz Shah Kotla, Delhi
Umpires: Anil Chaudhary and Virender Sharma

- Andhra won the toss and elected to field.

=== Final ===
Final
27 February 2018
Scorecard

Karnataka; 253 (45.5 overs)	v	Saurashtra; 212 (46.3 overs)
Mayank Agarwal 90 (79); Kamlesh Makvana 4/34 (8.5 overs)		Cheteshwar Pujara 94 (127); Krishnappa Gowtham 3/27 (10 overs)

Karnataka won by 41 runs
Feroz Shah Kotla, Delhi
Umpires: Anil Chaudhary and Nitin Menon
Player of the match: Mayank Agarwal (Karnataka)

- Saurashtra won the toss and elected to field.
