= List of things named after Jawaharlal Nehru =

This is a list of things named after Jawaharlal Nehru, the first Prime Minister of India. A Right to Information query raised in 2013 was answered saying that over 450 schemes, building, projects, institutions, etc. were named after the three family members (Jawaharlal Nehru, Indira Gandhi and Rajiv Gandhi) of Nehru–Gandhi family.

== Awards ==
- Jawaharlal Nehru Award
- Jawaharlal Nehru Fellowship

== Educational institutions ==
=== Colleges ===
- Jawaharlal Institute of Postgraduate Medical Education and Research, Pondicherry
- Jawahar Bal Bhavan Thrissur, Kerala
- Jawahar Bharati College, Kavali, Andhra Pradesh
- Jawahar Science College
- Jawaharlal Nehru Architecture and Fine Arts University, Hyderabad, Telangana
- Jawaharlal Nehru Cancer Hospital & Research Centre
- Jawaharlal Nehru Centre for Advanced Scientific Research, Bangalore, Karanataka
- Jawaharlal Nehru Engineering College, Aurangabad, Maharashtra
- Jawaharlal Nehru Government Engineering College, Sunder Nagar, Himachal Pradesh
- Jawaharlal Nehru Krishi Vishwa Vidyalaya, Jabalpur, Madhya Pradesh
- Jawaharlal Nehru Medical College, Ajmer
- Jawaharlal Nehru Medical College, Aligarh
- Jawaharlal Nehru Medical College, Belgaum
- Jawaharlal Nehru Medical College, Bhagalpur
- Jawaharlal Nehru National College of Engineering, Shimoga, Karnataka
- Jawaharlal Nehru Rajkeeya Mahavidyalaya, Port Blair
- Jawaharlal Nehru Technological University, Anantapur, Andhra Pradesh
- Jawaharlal Nehru Technological University, Hyderabad, Telangana
- Jawaharlal Nehru Technological University, Kakinada, Andhra Pradesh
- Jawaharlal Nehru Tropical Botanic Garden and Research Institute
- Jawaharlal Nehru University, New Delhi
- Nehru Arts, Science and Commerce College, Hubli, Karnataka
- Nehru Gram Bharati
- Nehru Homeopathic Medical College, New Delhi
- Nehru Memorial College, Puthanampatti, Tiruchirappalli, Tamil Nadu
- Nehru Memorial College, Sullia, Karnataka
- Pt. Jawahar Lal Nehru Memorial Medical College, Raipur, Chhattisgarh
- Pt. Jawaharlal Nehru Institute of Business Management, Ujjain, Madhya Pradesh
- Shri Nehru Maha Vidyalaya College of Arts & Sciences, Coimbatore, Tamil Nadu

=== Schools ===
- Jawahar LPS, Kurakkodu
- Jawahar Vidya Bhawan

==== Jawahar Navodaya Vidyalayas ====
- Jawahar Navodaya Vidyalaya, Ahmednagar
- Jawahar Navodaya Vidyalaya, Alappuzha
- Jawahar Navodaya Vidyalaya, Alipurduar
- Jawahar Navodaya Vidyalaya, Amroha
- Jawahar Navodaya Vidyalaya, Ashok Nagar
- Jawahar Navodaya Vidyalaya, Bagudi
- Jawahar Navodaya Vidyalaya Bahraich
- Jawahar Navodaya Vidyalaya, Ballia
- Jawahar Navodaya Vidyalaya, Bankura
- Jawahar Navodaya Vidyalaya, Barabanki
- Jawahar Navodaya Vidyalaya, Basdei
- Jawahar Navodaya Vidyalaya, Belpada
- Jawahar Navodaya Vidyalaya, Bhogaon
- Jawahar Navodaya Vidyalaya, Bilaspur
- Jawahar Navodaya Vidyalaya, Birbhum
- Jawahar Navodaya Vidyalaya, Bohani
- Jawahar Navodaya Vidyalaya Canacona
- Jawahar Navodaya Vidyalaya, Car Nicobar
- Jawahar Navodaya Vidyalaya, Churu
- Jawahar Navodaya Vidyalaya, Champhai
- Jawahar Navodaya Vidyalaya, Chandigarh
- Jawahar Navodaya Vidyalaya, Chendayadu
- Jawahar Navodaya Vidyalaya, Cooch Behar
- Jawahar Navodaya Vidyalaya, Daman
- Jawahar Navodaya Vidyalaya, Dakshin Dinajpur
- Jawahar Navodaya Vidyalaya, Dhalai Tripura
- Jawahar Navodaya Vidyalaya, Deoghar
- Jawahar Navodaya Vidyalaya, Diu
- Jawahar Navodaya Vidyalaya, Doda
- Jawahar Navodaya Vidyalaya, Durgapur
- Jawahar Navodaya Vidyalaya, East Sikkim
- Jawahar Navodaya Vidyalaya, Ernakulam
- Jawahar Navodaya Vidyalaya, Gajanur
- Jawahar Navodaya Vidyalaya, Golaghat
- Jawahar Navodaya Vidyalaya, Gomati
- Jawahar Navodaya Vidyalaya, Hamirpur
- Jawahar Navodaya Vidyalaya, Hooghly
- Jawahar Navodaya Vidyalaya, Idukki
- Jawahar Navodaya Vidyalaya, Indore
- Jawahar Navodaya Vidyalaya, Jaffarpur Kalan
- Jawahar Navodaya Vidyalaya, Jaswantpura
- Jawahar Navodaya Vidyalaya, Jojawar
- Jawahar Navodaya Vidyalaya, Jorhat
- Jawahar Navodaya Vidyalaya Kanpur
- Jawahar Navodaya Vidyalaya Kanpur Dehat
- Jawahar Navodaya Vidyalaya, Karaikal
- Jawahar Navodaya Vidyalaya, Karauli
- Jawahar Navodaya Vidyalaya, Kangra
- Jawahar Navodaya Vidyalaya, Kasaragod
- Jawahar Navodaya Vidyalaya, Khowai
- Jawahar Navodaya Vidyalaya, Khurai
- Jawahar Navodaya Vidyalaya, Kinnaur
- Jawahar Navodaya Vidyalaya, Kodagu
- Jawahar Navodaya Vidyalaya, Korba
- Jawahar Navodaya Vidyalaya, Korlahalli
- Jawahar Navodaya Vidyalaya, Kothali
- Jawahar Navodaya Vidyalaya, Kothipura Bilaspur
- Jawahar Navodaya Vidyalaya, Kottayam
- Jawahar Navodaya Vidyalaya, Kozhikode
- Jawahar Navodaya Vidyalaya, Kullu
- Jawahar Navodaya Vidyalaya, Lahaul and Spiti
- Jawahar Navodaya Vidyalaya, Madhubani
- Jawahar Navodaya Vidyalaya, Mahe
- Jawahar Navodaya Vidyalaya, Malappuram
- Jawahar Navodaya Vidyalaya, Mandaphia
- Jawahar Navodaya Vidyalaya, Mandi
- Jawahar Navodaya Vidyalaya, Mandya
- Jawahar Navodaya Vidyalaya, Megdong
- Jawahar Navodaya Vidyalaya, Middle Andaman
- Jawahar Navodaya Vidyalaya, Minicoy
- Jawahar Navodaya Vidyalaya, Mirzapur
- Jawahar Navodaya Vidyalaya, Mokokchung
- Jawahar Navodaya Vidyalaya, Mothuka, Faridabad
- Jawahar Navodaya Vidyalaya, Mundali
- Jawahar Navodaya Vidyalaya, Mungeshpur
- Jawahar Navodaya Vidyalaya Nizamasagar
- Jawahar Navodaya Vidyalaya, North 24 Parganas
- Jawahar Navodaya Vidyalaya, North Goa
- Jawahar Navodaya Vidyalaya, North Sikkim
- Jawahar Navodaya Vidyalaya, North Tripura
- Jawahar Navodaya Vidyalaya, Pailapool
- Jawahar Navodaya Vidyalaya, Palakkad
- Jawahar Navodaya Vidyalaya, Paota, Jaipur
- Jawahar Navodaya Vidyalaya, Panchavati
- Jawahar Navodaya Vidyalaya, Patan
- Jawahar Navodaya Vidyalaya, Patiala
- Jawahar Navodaya Vidyalaya, Pathanamthitta
- Jawahar Navodaya Vidyalaya, Peddapuram
- Jawahar Navodaya Vidyalaya, Pfukhro Mao
- Jawahar Navodaya Vidyalaya, Porbandar
- Jawahar Navodaya Vidyalaya, Prakasam
- Jawahar Navodaya Vidyalaya, Puducherry
- Jawahar Navodaya Vidyalaya, Raichur
- Jawahar Navodaya Vidyalaya, Rampura
- Jawahar Navodaya Vidyalaya, Rayagada
- Jawahar Navodaya Vidyalaya, Sahibganj
- Jawahar Navodaya Vidyalaya, Shyampur
- Jawahar Navodaya Vidyalaya, Silvassa
- Jawahar Navodaya Vidyalaya, Sirmaur
- Jawahar Navodaya Vidyalaya, Sitapur
- Jawahar Navodaya Vidyalaya, Solan
- Jawahar Navodaya Vidyalaya, South 24 Parganas
- Jawahar Navodaya Vidyalaya, South Andaman
- Jawahar Navodaya Vidyalaya, South Garo Hills
- Jawahar Navodaya Vidyalaya, South Sikkim
- Jawahar Navodaya Vidyalaya, Theog
- Jawahar Navodaya Vidyalaya, Thiruvananthapuram
- Jawahar Navodaya Vidyalaya, Thrissur
- Jawahar Navodaya Vidyalaya, Una
- Jawahar Navodaya Vidyalaya, Uttar Dinajpur
- Jawahar Navodaya Vidyalaya, Valasapalle
- Jawahar Navodaya Vidyalaya, Veleru
- Jawahar Navodaya Vidyalaya, Wayanad
- Jawahar Navodaya Vidyalaya, West Sikkim
- Jawahar Navodaya Vidyalaya, Yanam

== Museums, science centres and planetariums ==
- Jawaharlal Nehru Museum, Itanagar
- Nehru Museum of Science and Technology
- Jawahar Planetarium
- Nehru Planetarium
- Nehru Science Centre

== Neighbourhoods ==
- Jawahar Chowk
- Jawaharlal Nehru Auto Nagar Industrial Estate, Vijayawada
- Jawaharnagar (Gujarat Refinery)
- Nehru Nagar
- Nehru Place

== Ports ==
- Jawaharlal Nehru Port

== Parks and gardens ==
- Jawahar Circle
- Jawaharlal Nehru Memorial Botanical Garden
- Nehru Park, Burnpur
- Nehru Park, Delhi
- Nehru Park, Guwahati
- Nehru Park, Coimbatore
- Nehru Park, Thrissur
- Nehru Garden, Udaipur
- Nehru Garden, Jaipur
- Nehru Garden, Koynanagar
- Nehru Park, Didwana, Rajasthan
- Nehru Park, Sikar, Rajasthan - Edited By Peeyush Mishra

=== Zoos ===
- Jawaharlal Nehru Biological Park
- Nehru Zoological Park, Hyderabad

== Roads, bridges and tunnels ==
- Jawaharlal Nehru Road, Kolkata (Chowringhee Road)
- Jawahar Setu, a road bridge in Bihar
- Nehru Setu, a railway bridge next to the road bridge
- Jawahar Tunnel

== Schemes ==
- Jawaharlal Nehru National Urban Renewal Mission

== Sports ==
- Nehru Cup (cricket)
- Nehru Cup (football)
- Nehru Trophy Boat Race

=== Stadiums ===
- Jawaharlal Nehru Stadium (Chennai)
- Jawaharlal Nehru Stadium (Coimbatore)
- Jawaharlal Nehru Stadium (Delhi)
- Jawaharlal Nehru Stadium (Kochi)
- Jawaharlal Nehru Stadium (Margao)
- Jawaharlal Nehru Stadium (Shillong)
- Jawaharlal Nehru Stadium, Ghaziabad
- Jawaharlal Nehru Stadium, Tiruchirappalli
- Nehru Smarak Stadium
- Nehru Stadium, Durgapur
- Nehru Stadium, Guwahati
- Nehru Stadium, Hubli
- Nehru Stadium, Indore
- Nehru Stadium, Kottayam
- Nehru Stadium, Pune
- Nehru Stadium, Shimoga
- Nehru Stadium, Tumkur

== Others ==
- Jawahar Dweep
- Jawahar Kala Kendra
- Jawahar Point
- Jawahar Sagar Dam
- Nehru Brigade
- Nehru Centre
- Nehru Centre, London
- Nehru jacket
- Nehru Foundation for Development
- Nehruvian socialism
- Pandit Nehru Bus Station

== See also ==
- List of things named after prime ministers of India
- List of things named after Indira Gandhi
- List of things named after Rajiv Gandhi
