= List of things named after Rabindranath Tagore =

The following things have been named after Rabindranath Tagore, Bengali poet, writer, composer, philosopher and painter.

== Awards and prizes ==
- Rabindranath Tagore Literary Prize
- Tagore Award
- Rabindra Puraskar
- Tagore Ratna and Tagore Puraskar

== Festivals ==
- Rabindra Jayanti
- Tagore International Literature and Arts Festival

== Universities and institutes ==
- Rabindranath Tagore University, Bhopal, Madhya Pradesh, India.
- Rabindra Bharati University, Kolkata, India.
- Rabindranath Tagore Medical College
- Rabindranath Tagore International Institute of Cardiac Sciences, Kolkata, India
- Rabindra University, Sahjadpur, Shirajganj, Bangladesh.
- Rabindranath Tagore University, Hojai, Assam, India
- Rabindra Maitree University, Courtpara, Kushtia, Bangladesh.
- Rabindra Srijonkala University, Keraniganj, Dhaka, Bangladesh
- Rabindranath Thakur Mahavidyalaya, Tripura, India
- Rabindra Mahavidyalaya
- Tagore Government College of Education
- Tagore International School
- West Bengal Council of Rabindra Open Schooling
- Dum Dum Motijheel Rabindra Mahavidyalaya
- Rathindra Krishi Vigyan Kendra, Visva Bharati
- Rabindranath Tagore Secondary School, Mauritius
- Tagore Baal Niketan Sr. Sec. School, Karnal
- Tagore Vidyaniketan, Taliparamba
- GBOU Secondary School No 653 in Kalininsky District of Saint Petersburg, Russia
- Oberchule an der Weide, a gymnasium school in former East Berlin, Germany

== Buildings ==
- Tagore Theatre
- Rabindranath Tagore Memorial Auditorium, Sri Lanka
- Rabindra Parishad
- Rabindra Tirtha
- Rabindranath Tagore Academic Building, Rajshahi University, Bangladesh
- Bishwakabi Rabindranath Tagore Hall, Jahangirnagar University, Bangladesh
- Rabindra Nazrul Art Building, Arts Faculty, Islamic University, Bangladesh
- Rabindra Library (Central), Assam University, India
- Ravindra Bharathi, Hyderabad
- Ravindra Kalakshetra, Bangalore
- Rabindra Sadan, Kolkata
- Rabindra Mandap Auditorium, Bhubaneswar

== Road and Street ==
Within India and Bangladesh

- Rabindra Sarani in Kolkata
- Rabindranath Road in Jashore
- Rabindra Sarani in Dhaka

Outside India and Bangladesh

- Rabindranath Tagore Straße in Berlin
- Rehov Tagore in Tel-Aviv
- Rabindranath Tagore Street in Ankara
- Thakurova, Prague
- Rue Tagore in 13th Arrondissement, Paris lining Jardin Juan Miro and a bust inside it
- ul. Rabindrnatha Tagore, Warsaw, in Łódź, located near Juliusz Słowacki Park and the Lwowskich Lotników Roundabout and a street in the Mokotów district of Warsaw, Poland.

== Bridge ==
- Rabindra Setu, Kolkata

== Places ==
Within India and Bangladesh

- Rabindra Sarobar
- Rabindra Sarobor, Dhanmandi Lake, Dhaka
- Tagore Hill
- Tagoretown
- R. T. Nagar
- Rabindranath Tagore Beach, Karwar, Karnataka

Outside India and Bangladesh

- Thakurova, Prague
- Rue Tagore in 13th Arondissement, Paris lining Jardin Juan Miro and a bust inside it
- ul. Rabindrnatha Tagore, Warsaw, in Łódź, located near Juliusz Słowacki Park and the Lwowskich Lotników Roundabout and a street in the Mokotów district of Warsaw, Poland.

== Busts ==
Inside India and Bangladesh

- IIEST Shibpur, Howrah, West Bengal : A full sized statue of Rabindranath Tagore is placed near to the main gate of the university and is a community centre of students who occasionally sit and spend their leisure time there
- Kalna, West Bengal, India: A statue of Rabindranath Tagore was installed at an important thoroughfare (Rabi More) by local authorities to honour the Nobel laureate and commemorate his legacy in the region.
- Jamshedpur, Jharkhand, India: A bronze statue of Rabindranath Tagore was unveiled at Rabindra Bhavan in Sakchi; created by sculptor Niranjan Pradhan, it is one of the tallest carvings of the poet in the state.
- Lucknow, Uttar Pradesh, India: A life-size statue of Rabindranath Tagore has been installed at Lucknow University's Tagore Library, unveiled as part of campus improvements.
- Dhaka University, Bangladesh: A student-built sculpture of Rabindranath Tagore was installed on campus near the Raju Memorial Sculpture as a symbolic piece tied to discourse on freedom of speech; it has been removed and reinstalled in protest contexts.
- Kolkata, West Bengal, India: A statue of Rabindranath Tagore is widely noted as a city landmark around Rabindra Sadan near Howrah Bridge (visibility in travel guides and image archives).
- Siliguri, West Bengal, India: Municipal plans were reported for a bronze statue of Rabindranath Tagore near Gandhi More, but a formal unveiling source has not yet been archived.

Outside India and Bangladesh

Europe

- London, United Kingdom: Gordon Square – A bronze bust of Rabindranath Tagore, unveiled by HRH The Prince of Wales on 7 July 2011 to commemorate his 150th birth anniversary; sculpted by Shenda Amery and installed near the University of London.
- Stratford-upon-Avon, United Kingdom: Garden of Shakespeare's Birthplace – A bust of Rabindranath Tagore installed in the garden of Shakespeare's Birthplace, dedicated in 1996 to celebrate cultural links between Tagore's work and Shakespeare.
- Edinburgh, Scotland: Sandeman House garden, near the Royal Mile – A bronze bust of Gurudev Rabindranath Tagore by Ram V. Sutar was unveiled on 3 July 2025, placed opposite the bust of Sir Patrick Geddes in recognition of their long-standing intellectual friendship and cultural cooperation.
- Dublin, Ireland: St Stephen's Green – A bronze bust of Rabindranath Tagore commissioned by the Indian Council for Cultural Relations and installed near the Leeson Street entrance in 2011 to honour his literary influence and ties with Irish poets including W.B. Yeats.
- Sligo, Ireland: Wine Street – A bronze bust of Rabindranath Tagore, unveiled on 23 June 2015, located opposite the former Pollexfen House (Yeats’ maternal grandparents' home). A gift from India, it marks W.B. Yeats’ 150th birth anniversary and celebrates the friendship between Tagore and Yeats.
- Valladolid, Spain: Campo Grande Park – A commemorative bust donated by the Indian Council for Cultural Relations (ICCR), marking Tagore's global literary legacy and Indo–Spanish cultural ties.
- Barcelona, Spain: Museum of Barcelona – Installed as part of India–Spain cultural exchange initiatives celebrating Tagore's international influence.
- Prague, Czech Republic: Thákurova Park, Dejvice – Located on a street named after Tagore, symbolising his influence on Czech intellectual and literary culture.
- Paris, France: Jardin Joan-Miró, Rue Tagore – A public monument commemorating Tagore's philosophical and literary legacy in France.
- Lausanne, Switzerland: Anthropole, University of Lausanne – A bronze bust of Rabindranath Tagore, unveiled on 4 October 2011 by then-President of India, Smt. Pratibha Devi Singh Patil, to commemorate his 150th birth anniversary. The installation coincided with the establishment of the Rabindranath Tagore Chair on Indian Studies at the university, initially focusing on Hindi teaching.
- Leuven, Belgium: KU Leuven Literary Garden – Installed in the Faculty of Arts as a symbol of intercultural humanism and global literature.
- Balatonfüred, Hungary: Tagore Promenade – Commemorates Tagore's recovery in Hungary and his enduring cultural memory in the region.
- Uppsala, Sweden: Uppsala University – Symbolises Tagore's intellectual links with Scandinavian academic traditions.
- Maribor, Slovenia: Magdalena Park – A cultural monument representing Tagore's universalist philosophy.
- Berlin, Germany: Humboldt University – Installed in recognition of Tagore's contributions to world literature and humanism.
- Heidelberg, Germany: Heidelberg University – Represents Indo–German cultural and academic cooperation.
- The Hague, Netherlands: Hague Public Library – Installed to mark Tagore's global cultural footprint.
- Leiden, Netherlands: Institute of History – Represents academic recognition of Tagore's civilisational thought.
- Karlskoga Municipality, Sweden: Björkborn Manor – Installed as part of international sculptural heritage projects.
- Bucharest, Romania – Represents Tagore's recognition in Eastern European cultural diplomacy.

Asia

- Beijing, China: Peking University – Honours Tagore's historical intellectual exchanges with China.
- Shanghai, China: Maoming Lu–Nanchang Lu – Symbol of Indo–Chinese cultural relations.
- Kunming, China: Yunnan University – Commemorates Tagore's educational and philosophical legacy.
- Karuizawa, Japan: Tagore Memorial Statue – Built to honour his visits to Japan and his message of peace.
- Tokyo, Japan: Soka University – Gifted by ICCR as a symbol of Indo–Japanese cultural friendship.
- Osaka, Japan: Central Park – Public installation reflecting Tagore's cultural legacy in Japan.
- Lautoka, Fiji: ICCR sub-centre – Cultural monument promoting Indian heritage in the Pacific region.
- Seoul, South Korea: Daehangno – Honours Tagore's poem “The Lamp of the East” and Indo–Korean cultural ties.
- Yogyakarta, Indonesia: Borobudur Temple – Symbol of Buddhist cultural connections and Tagore's love for Indonesia.
- Bali, Indonesia – Installed alongside Tagore's poetry commemorating his 1927 visit.
- Ankara, Turkey – Monument symbolising Indo–Turkish cultural friendship.
- Yangon, Myanmar – Donated by ICCR as part of India–Myanmar cultural relations.
- Oskemen, Kazakhstan: Zhastar Park – Represents Indo–Kazakh cultural symbolism and literary kinship.
- Dushanbe, Tajikistan: Bukhoro Street – Monument of Indo–Tajik cultural and literary diplomacy.
- Bangkok, Thailand – Cultural installation representing Tagore's philosophical legacy.
- Bac Ninh City, Vietnam: International Friendship Park – Celebrates India–Vietnam cultural relations.
- Hanoi, Vietnam: Vietnam Museum of Literature – Honours Tagore's literary influence in Vietnamese education.
- Jerusalem, Israel: Hebrew University of Jerusalem – Academic tribute recognising Tagore's influence in Hebrew scholarship.
- Bsharri, Lebanon: Gibran Khalil Gibran Museum – Symbol of Indo–Lebanese literary and philosophical ties.
- Singapore: Indian Heritage Centre – Represents Tagore's role in Indian diaspora heritage.
- Sri Lanka: A bust of Rabindranath Tagore was presented through ICCR cultural diplomacy initiatives.

Africa

- Cairo, Egypt – Artistic tribute within a global miniature sculpture collection.

North America

- Somerset, New Jersey, United States: Babalalao Temple Grounds – A statue (full figure) of Rabindranath Tagore was installed in 2021 as a public monument to commemorate the Nobel laureate's literary legacy in the United States.
- Vancouver, Canada: University of British Columbia (UBC) – A bronze bust installed in 2002 near the Asian Centre and Nitobe Gardens with support from ICCR, serving as a cultural landmark and site for commemorating Tagore's birth anniversary.

South America

- Mexico City, Mexico: Alcaldía Azcapotzalco – A statue of Rabindranath Tagore located at the intersection of Calzada de Camarones and Calle Salónica, where four colonias (neighborhoods) meet near Colonia Clavería. The sculpture, created by artist Casy Paul, was inaugurated on 15 August 2000 and serves as a public tribute to Tagore's literary and cultural legacy.
- Mexico City, Mexico: Plaza de la India (Indian Square), Santa María Avenue – A monument honoring Mahatma Gandhi, Jawaharlal Nehru, and Rabindranath Tagore, created by Claudi Tarragó in 1968. It serves as a symbol of Indo-Mexican friendship and the cultural legacy of these figures.
- Santiago, Chile: Plaza de la India (Indian Square), Santa María Avenue, Providencia – A bust of Rabindranath Tagore is installed alongside monuments honoring Mahatma Gandhi and Jawaharlal Nehru. The square commemorates the cultural and diplomatic ties between India and Chile.
- Punta Arenas, Chile: Plaza in front of the Hindu Temple – A statue of Rabindranath Tagore stands in front of the Hindu Temple in the Magallanes Region, serving as a symbol of Indian cultural heritage and Tagore's global literary influence.
- Buenos Aires, Argentina: El Rosedal de Palermo – A bust of Rabindranath Tagore, inaugurated in May 2019 by the Embassy of India, is located in the rose garden of Palermo. The monument commemorates Tagore's 1924 visit to Argentina, during which he stayed with writer Victoria Ocampo and influenced local intellectuals. The bust is a site for floral tributes and cultural events led by Indian officials and local dignitaries.
- Bogotá, Colombia: Instituto Caro y Cuervo (Yerbabuena) – A bust of Rabindranath Tagore, unveiled on 7 July 2012 by India's Minister of State for Commerce and Industry, Jyotiraditya Scindia, honors the poet's vision of peace and fraternity. The Indian Embassy in Bogotá regularly holds commemorative events, including floral tributes on Tagore's birthday, emphasizing his literary influence and promoting Indian culture.
- Lima, Peru: Escuela Rabindranath Tagore – A bust of Rabindranath Tagore is installed at the entrance of the school named in his honor. The sculpture was donated by Mrs. Angela Torres de Fernández Dávila and is documented on Wikimedia Commons. Although Tagore was invited to Peru's centennial celebrations in 1924, he was unable to attend due to illness. The bust serves to recognize his literary and cultural legacy in Peru.
- Cuenca, Ecuador: University of Cuenca – A bronze bust of Gurudev Rabindranath Tagore, inaugurated on 12 July 2019, was gifted by the people of India. The bust honors Tagore's universal message of harmony, humanism, and cultural exchange, and is located on the university campus, commemorating the literary and cultural ties between India and Ecuador.

Australia

- Sydney, Australia: Macquarie University – Bust in an outdoor garden area, part of a broader initiative promoting India-Australia cultural exchange, including the establishment of a Tagore Chair in Arts and Culture.
- Canberra, Australia: Theo Notaras Multicultural Centre – Bronze bust unveiled in 2016, attended by cultural dignitaries, celebrating Tagore's literary and philosophical contributions.

== Museums ==
- Rabindra Bharati Museum, at Jorasanko Thakur Bari, Kolkata, India
- Tagore Memorial Museum, at Shilaidaha Kuthibadi, Shilaidaha, Bangladesh
- Rabindra Memorial Museum at Shahzadpur Kachharibari, Shahzadpur, Bangladesh
- Rabindra Bhavan Museum, in Santiniketan, India
- Rabindra Museum, in Mungpoo, near Kalimpong, India
- Patisar Rabindra Kacharibari, Patisar, Atrai, Naogaon, Bangladesh
- Pithavoge Rabindra Memorial Complex, Pithavoge, Rupsha, Khulna, Bangladesh
- Rabindra Complex, Dakkhindihi village, Phultala Upazila, Khulna, Bangladesh

== Train stations ==
- Rabindra Sarobar Metro Station, Kolkata
- Rabindra Sadan Metro Station, Kolkata
- Tagore Garden Metro Station, New Delhi
- Tagore MRT Station, Singapore

== Species ==
- Barapasaurus tagorei

== Entertainment ==
Web series

- Rabindranath Ekhane Kokhono Khete Aseni

== See also ==
- List of things named after Mahatma Gandhi
- List of things named after Rajiv Gandhi
- List of things named after Indira Gandhi
- List of things named after Jawaharlal Nehru
- List of things named after B. R. Ambedkar
