= Jawaharlal Nehru Stadium =

Jawaharlal Nehru Stadium may refer to several sports stadiums in India:

- Nehru Stadium, Margao, also known as Fatorda Stadium, multi-use
- Nehru Stadium, Delhi
- Nehru Stadium, Coimbatore, multi-purpose
- Nehru Stadium, Ghaziabad, multi-purpose
- Nehru Stadium, Chennai, multi-use football and athletics
- Nehru Stadium, Kochi, football (soccer) and cricket
- Nehru Stadium, Shillong, multi-use football and polo
- Nehru Stadium, Tiruchirappalli, cricket
- Nehru University Stadium, multi-purpose university sports complex in Delhi
- Nehru Stadium, Guwahati, multi-purpose
- Nehru Stadium, Indore, cricket
- Nehru Stadium, Kottayam, multi-use football and athletics
- Nehru Stadium, Pune, multi-purpose
- Nehru Stadium, Durgapur, multi-purpose
- Nehru Stadium, Tumkur, multi-purpose
- Nehru Stadium, Hubli, multi-purpose
- Nehru Stadium, Shimoga, multi-purpose
- Nehru Stadium, Gurgaon, multi-purpose

== See also ==
- Nehru (disambiguation)
