= List of Jawahar Navodaya Vidyalayas =

List of all Jawahar Navodaya Vidyalaya group of schools in India

There are 661 Jawahar Navodaya Vidyalaya schools in India. These JNVs are governed by eight different regions. These Regional Offices are at Bhopal, Chandigarh, Hyderabad, Jaipur, Lucknow, Patna, Pune and Shillong which have jurisdiction over different states and union territories of India. To get the admission in Navodaya Vidyalayas candidate must pass the exam of JNVST. The list of various Jawahar Navodaya Vidyalayas in India listed regionally, including states:

== Bhopal Region ==
There are a total of 113 JNVs in Bhopal Region. The state-wise list is follows:

=== Chhattisgarh ===
SL. No.	Name	Established	Website
1	Jawahar Navodaya Vidyalaya, Korba	2001	JNV Korba
2	Jawahar Navodaya Vidyalaya, Mahasamund	2000	JNV Mahasamund
3	Jawahar Navodaya Vidyalaya, Raipur	1986	JNV Raipur
4	Jawahar Navodaya Vidyalaya, Rajnandgaon	1988	JNV Rajnandgaon
5	Jawahar Navodaya Vidyalaya, Sukma-I	2017	JNV Sukma-I
6	Jawahar Navodaya Vidyalaya, Sukma-II	2009	JNV Sukma-II
7	Jawahar Navodaya Vidyalaya, Mungeli	2017	JNV Mungeli
8	Jawahar Navodaya Vidyalaya, Balodabazar	2017	JNV Balodabazar
9	Jawahar Navodaya Vidyalaya, Balrampur	2017	JNV Balrampur
10	Jawahar Navodaya Vidyalaya, Surguja	2017	JNV Surguja
11	Jawahar Navodaya Vidyalaya, Durg	1986	JNV Durg
12	Jawahar Navodaya Vidyalaya, Bilaspur	1987	JNV Bilaspur
13	Jawahar Navodaya Vidyalaya, Bijapur	2017	JNV Bijapur
14	Jawahar Navodaya Vidyalaya, Kabirdham	2006	JNV Kabirdham
15	Jawahar Navodaya Vidyalaya, Surajpur	1992	JNV Surajpur
16	Jawahar Navodaya Vidyalaya, Janjgir Champa	2002	JNV Janjgir Champa
17	Jawahar Navodaya Vidyalaya, Gariaband	2017	JNV Gariaband
18	Jawahar Navodaya Vidyalaya, Raigarh	1992	JNV Raigarh
19	Jawahar Navodaya Vidyalaya, Kanker	2006	JNV Kanker
20	Jawahar Navodaya Vidyalaya, Bastar	2005	JNV Bastar
21	Jawahar Navodaya Vidyalaya, Dantewada	1993	JNV Dantewada
22	Jawahar Navodaya Vidyalaya, Narayanpur	2017	JNV Narayanpur
23	Jawahar Navodaya Vidyalaya, Korea	2006	JNV Korea
24	Jawahar Navodaya Vidyalaya, Kondagaon	2017	JNV Kondagaon
25	Jawahar Navodaya Vidyalaya, Bemetara	2017	JNV Bemetara
26	Jawahar Navodaya Vidyalaya, Balod	2017	JNV Balod
27	Jawahar Navodaya Vidyalaya, Jashpur	2006	JNV Jashpur
28	Jawahar Navodaya Vidyalaya, Dhamtari	2004	JNV Dhamtari

=== Madhya Pradesh ===
SL. No.	Name	Established	Website
1	Jawahar Navodaya Vidyalaya, Tikamgarh	1986	JNV Tikamgarh
2	Jawahar Navodaya Vidyalaya, Alirajpur	1986	JNV Alirajpur
3	Jawahar Navodaya Vidyalaya, Ashoknagar	1988	JNV Ashoknagar
4	Jawahar Navodaya Vidyalaya, Anuppur	1987	JNV Anuppur
5	Jawahar Navodaya Vidyalaya, Ashoknagar	1988	JNV Ashoknagar
6	Jawahar Navodaya Vidyalaya, Burhanpur	1986	JNV Burhanpur
7	Jawahar Navodaya vidyalaya, Chhatarpur	1987	JNV Chhatarpur
8	Jawahar Navodaya Vidyalaya, Chhindwara	1993	JNV Chhindwara
9	Jawahar Navodaya Vidyalaya, Damoh	1986	JNV Damoh
10	Jawahar Navodaya Vidyalaya, Dewas	1987	JNV Dewas
11	Jawahar Navodaya Vidyalaya, Dhar	1987	JNV Dhar
12	Jawahar Navodaya Vidyalaya, Dinduri	2003	JNV Dindori
13	Jawahar Navodaya Vidyalaya, Gwalior	1994	JNV Gwalior
14	Jawahar Navodaya Vidyalaya, Harda	2002	JNV Harda
15	Jawahar Navodaya Vidyalaya, Hoshangabad	1987	JNV Hoshangabad
16	Jawahar Navodaya Vidyalaya, Jabalpur	1986	JNV Jabalpur
17	Jawahar Navodaya Vidyalaya, Jhabua-I	2017	JNV Jhabua-I
18	Jawahar Navodaya Vidyalaya, Jhabua-II	2009	
19	Jawahar Navodaya Vidyalaya, Khandwa		
20	Jawahar Navodaya Vidyalaya, Khargone		
21	Jawahar Navodaya Vidyalaya, Mandla		
22	Jawahar Navodaya Vidyalaya, Morena		
23	Jawahar Navodaya Vidyalaya, Narsinghpur	1986	JNV Narsinghpur
24	Jawahar Navodaya Vidyalaya, Betul	1993	JNV Betul
25	Jawahar Navodaya Vidyalaya, Raisen		
26	Jawahar Navodaya Vidyalaya, Ratlam-I	1991	JNV Ratlam-I
27	Jawahar Navodaya Vidyalaya, Ratlam-II		
28	Jawahar Navodaya Vidyalaya, Datia		
29	Jawahar Navodaya Vidyalaya, Guna		
30	Jawahar Navodaya Vidyalaya, Indore	1987	JNV Indore
31	Jawahar Navodaya Vidyalaya, Katni		
32	Jawahar Navodaya Vidyalaya, Mandsaur	2002	JNV Mandsaur
33	Jawahar Navodaya Vidyalaya, Neemuch	1986	JNV Neemuch
34	Jawahar Navodaya Vidyalaya, Panna	1986	JNV Panna
35	Jawahar Navodaya Vidyalaya, Rewa		
36	Jawahar Navodaya Vidyalaya, Sagar	1986	JNV Sagar
37	Jawahar Navodaya Vidyalaya, Satna	1992	JNV Satna
38	Jawahar Navodaya Vidyalaya, Sehore	1986	JNV Sehore
39	Jawahar Navodaya Vidyalaya, Seoni	1987	JNV Seoni
40	Jawahar Navodaya Vidyalaya, Shahdol		
41	Jawahar Navodaya Vidyalaya, Shajapur		
42	Jawahar Navodaya Vidyalaya, Sheopur		
43	Jawahar Navodaya Vidyalaya, Shivpuri		
44	Jawahar Navodaya Vidyalaya, Sidhi		
45	Jawahar Navodaya Vidyalaya, Ujjain-I		
46	Jawahar Navodaya Vidyalaya, Ujjain-II		
47	Jawahar Navodaya Vidyalaya, Umaria		
48	Jawahar Navodaya Vidyalaya, Vidisha	1992	JNV Vidisha
49	Jawahar Navodaya Vidyalaya, Barwani		
50	Jawahar Navodaya Vidyalaya, Rajgarh		
51	Jawahar Navodaya Vidyalaya, Bhind		
52	Jawahar Navodaya Vidyalaya, Bhopal		
53	Jawahar Navodaya Vidyalaya, Balaghat		
54	Jawahar Navodaya Vidyalaya, Singrauli		

=== Odisha ===
SL. No.	Name	Established	Website
1	Jawahar Navodaya Vidyalaya, Bargarh		
2	Jawahar Navodaya Vidyalaya, Balasore	1987	JNV Balasore
3	Jawahar Navodaya Vidyalaya, Angul		
4	Jawahar Navodaya Vidyalaya, Jagatsinghpur		
5	Jawahar Navodaya Vidyalaya, Jharsuguda	2002	JNV Jharsuguda
6	Jawahar Navodaya Vidyalaya, Kalahandi	1987	JNV Kalahandi
7	Jawahar Navodaya Vidyalaya, Kendrapara		
8	Jawahar Navodaya Vidyalaya, Khurda	2003	JNV Khurda
9	Jawahar Navodaya Vidyalaya, Puri		
10	Jawahar Navodaya Vidyalaya, Malkangiri-I		
11	Jawahar Navodaya Vidyalaya, Malkangiri-II		
12	Jawahar Navodaya Vidyalaya, Koraput		
13	Jawahar Navodaya Vidyalaya, Mayurbhanj		
14	Jawahar Navodaya Vidyalaya, Nabarangpur		
15	Jawahar Navodaya Vidyalaya, Nayagarh		
16	Jawahar Navodaya Vidyalaya, Nuapada		
17	Jawahar Navodaya Vidyalaya, Phulbani		
18	Jawahar Navodaya Vidyalaya, Rayagada	2002	JNV Rayagada
19	Jawahar Navodaya Vidyalaya, Sambalpur	1987	JNV Sambalpur
20	Jawahar Navodaya Vidyalaya, Sonepur		
21	Jawahar Navodaya Vidyalaya, Sundargarh	1987	JNV Sundargarh
22	Jawahar Navodaya Vidyalaya, Jajpur		
23	Jawahar Navodaya Vidyalaya, Keonjhar	1987	JNV Keonjhar
24	Jawahar Navodaya Vidyalaya, Ganjam		
25	Jawahar Navodaya Vidyalaya, Gajapati		
26	Jawahar Navodaya Vidyalaya, Dhenkanal		
27	Jawahar Navodaya Vidyalaya, Deogarh		
28	Jawahar Navodaya Vidyalaya, Cuttack	1986	JNV Cuttack
29	Jawahar Navodaya Vidyalaya, Boudh		
30	Jawahar Navodaya Vidyalaya, Bolangir	1987	JNV Bolangir
31	Jawahar Navodaya Vidyalaya, Bhadrak		

== Chandigarh Region ==
There are a total of 58 JNVs in Chandigarh Region. The state-wise list is follows:

=== Chandigarh ===
SL. No.	Name	Established	Website
1	Jawahar Navodaya Vidyalaya, Chandigarh	1995	JNV Chandigarh

=== Himachal Pradesh ===
SL. No.	Name	Established	Website
1	Jawahar Navodaya Vidyalaya, Sirmaur	1986	JNV Sirmaur
2	Jawahar Navodaya Vidyalaya, Una	1987	JNV Una
3	Jawahar Navodaya Vidyalaya, Bilaspur		
4	Jawahar Navodaya Vidyalaya, Kangra		
5	Jawahar Navodaya Vidyalaya, Kinnaur	1987	JNV Kinnaur
6	Jawahar Navodaya Vidyalaya, Kullu	2010	JNV Kullu
7	Jawahar Navodaya Vidyalaya, Solan	1992	JNV Solan
8	Jawahar Navodaya Vidyalaya, Lahaul Spiti	2000	JNV Lahaul Spiti
9	Jawahar Navodaya Vidyalaya, Hamirpur	1986–87	JNV Hamirpur
10	Jawahar Navodaya Vidyalaya, Chamba	1986	JNV Chamba
11	Jawahar Navodaya Vidyalaya, Shimla	1986	JNV Shimla
12	Jawahar Navodaya Vidyalaya, Mandi	1986	JNV Mandi

=== Jammu and Kashmir ===
SL. No.	Name	Established	Website
1	Jawahar Navodaya Vidyalaya, Shopian	1986	JNV Shopian
2	Jawahar Navodaya Vidyalaya, Rajouri	1986	Rajouri
3	Jawahar Navodaya Vidyalaya, Kathua		
4	Jawahar Navodaya Vidyalaya, Doda	1986	JNV Doda
5	Jawahar Navodaya Vidyalaya, Pulwama	2020	JNV Pulwama
6	Jawahar Navodaya Vidyalaya, Bandipora	2020	JNV Bandipora
7	Jawahar Navodaya Vidyalaya, Budgam	1987	JNV Budgam
8	Jawahar Navodaya Vidyalaya, Kishtwar		JNV Kishtwar
9	Jawahar Navodaya Vidyalaya, Anantnag	1986	JNV Anantnag
10	Jawahar Navodaya Vidyalaya, Baramulla	1986	JNV Baramulla
11	Jawahar Navodaya Vidyalaya, Ganderbal	1987	JNV Ganderbal
12	Jawahar Navodaya Vidyalaya, Jammu-I		
13	Jawahar Navodaya Vidyalaya, Jammu-II	2017	JNV Jammu-II
14	Jawahar Navodaya Vidyalaya, Kulgam	2010	JNV Kulgam
15	Jawahar Navodaya Vidyalaya, Kupwara	1985–86	JNV Kupwara
16	Jawahar Navodaya Vidyalaya, Poonch	1986–87	JNV Poonch
17	Jawahar Navodaya Vidyalaya, Ramban	2019	JNV Ramban
18	Jawahar Navodaya Vidyalaya, Reasi		JNV Reasi
19	Jawahar Navodaya Vidyalaya, Samba	1987	JNV Samba
20	Jawahar Navodaya Vidyalaya, Udhampur	1986	JNV Udhampur

=== Ladakh ===
SL. No.	Name	Established	Website
1	Jawahar Navodaya Vidyalaya, Kargil	1988	JNV Kargil
2	Jawahar Navodaya Vidyalaya, Leh	1986	JNV Leh

=== Punjab ===
SL. No.	Name	Established	Website
1	Jawahar Navodaya Vidyalaya, Mohali	2009	JNV Mohali
2	Jawahar Navodaya Vidyalaya, Pathankot	1992	JNV Pathankot
3	Jawahar Navodaya Vidyalaya, Patiala	1989	JNV Patiala
4	Jawahar Navodaya Vidyalaya, Ropar	1986	JNV Ropar
5	Jawahar Navodaya Vidyalaya, Sangrur	1985–86	JNV Sangrur
6	Jawahar Navodaya Vidyalaya, Mansa	2000–2001	JNV Mansa
7	Jawahar Navodaya Vidyalaya, Kapurthala	1988	JNV Kapurthala
8	Jawahar Navodaya Vidyalaya, SBS Nagar	1986	JNV SBS Nagar
9	Jawahar Navodaya Vidyalaya, Jallandhar		
10	Jawahar Navodaya Vidyalaya, Gurdaspur	2019	JNV Gurdaspur
11	Jawahar Navodaya Vidyalaya, Hoshiarpur	2002	JNV Hoshiarpur
12	Jawahar Navodaya Vidyalaya, Tarn Taran	1988	JNV Tarn Taran
13	Jawahar Navodaya Vidyalaya, Fazilka		
14	Jawahar Navodaya Vidyalaya, Fatehgarh Sahib	1986	JNV Fatehgarh Sahib
15	Jawahar Navodaya Vidyalaya, Faridkot	2003	JNV Faridkot
16	Jawahar Navodaya Vidyalaya, Barnala	2007	JNV Barnala
17	Jawahar Navodaya Vidyalaya, Amritsar-I	2007	JNV Amritsar-I
18	Jawahar Navodaya Vidyalaya, Amritsar-II	2009	JNV Amritsar-II
19	Jawahar Navodaya Vidyalaya, Bathinda	1994–95	JNV Bathinda
20	Jawahar Navodaya Vidyalaya, Ferozepur	1992	JNV Ferozepur
21	Jawahar Navodaya Vidyalaya, Ludhiana	2002	JNV Ludhiana
22	Jawahar Navodaya Vidyalaya, Muktsar	1986	JNV Muktsar Sahib
23	Jawahar Navodaya Vidyalaya, Moga	2002	JNV Moga

== Amaravati Region ==
There are a total of 19 JNVs in Amaravathi Region. The state-wise list of JNVs is follows:

=== Andaman and Nicobar Islands ===
SL. No.	Name	Established	Website
1	Jawahar Navodaya Vidyalaya, South Andaman	2017	JNV South Andaman
2	Jawahar Navodaya Vidyalaya, North & Middle Andaman	1986	JNV North & South Andaman
3	Jawahar Navodaya Vidyalaya, Car Nicobar	1987	JNV Car Nicobar

=== Andhra Pradesh ===
SL. No.	Name	Established	Website
1	Jawahar Navodaya Vidyalaya, Srikakulam		
2	Jawahar Navodaya Vidyalaya, Vizianagaram		
4	Jawahar Navodaya Vidyalaya, Visakhapatnam		
5	Jawahar Navodaya Vidyalaya, East Godavari-I		
6	Jawahar Navodaya Vidyalaya, East Godavari-II		
7	Jawahar Navodaya Vidyalaya, West Godavari		
8	Jawahar Navodaya Vidyalaya, Krishna		
10	Jawahar Navodaya Vidyalaya, Guntur		
11	Jawahar Navodaya Vidyalaya, Prakasam-I		
12	Jawahar Navodaya Vidyalaya, Prakasam-II		
13	Jawahar Navodaya Vidyalaya, Kadapa		
14	Jawahar Navodaya Vidyalaya, Kurnool		
15	Jawahar Navodaya Vidyalaya, Chittoor		
16	Jawahar Navodaya Vidyalaya, Ananthapuram		

== Hyderabad Region ==
There are a total of 62 JNVs in Hyderabad Region. The state-wise list of JNVs is follows:

=== Karnataka ===
SL. No.	Name	Established	Website
1	Jawahar Navodaya Vidyalaya, Koppal		
2	Jawahar Navodaya Vidyalaya, Bellary		
3	Jawahar Navodaya Vidyalaya, Bidar		
4	Jawahar Navodaya Vidyalaya, Chamrajnagar		
5	Jawahar Navodaya Vidyalaya, Chitradurga		
6	Jawahar Navodaya Vidyalaya, Gadag		
7	Jawahar Navodaya Vidyalaya, Hassan		
8	Jawahar Navodaya Vidyalaya, Haveri		
9	Jawahar Navodaya Vidyalaya, Kolar		
10	Jawahar Navodaya Vidyalaya, Mandya		
11	Jawahar Navodaya Vidyalaya, Raichur		
12	Jawahar Navodaya Vidyalaya, Ramanagara		
13	Jawahar Navodaya Vidyalaya, Shimoga		
14	Jawahar Navodaya Vidyalaya, Udupi		
15	Jawahar Navodaya Vidyalaya, Yadgiri		
16	Jawahar Navodaya Vidyalaya, Bangalore Urban		
17	Jawahar Navodaya Vidyalaya, Belagavi		
28	Jawahar Navodaya Vidyalaya, Chickmagalur		
19	Jawahar Navodaya Vidyalaya, Dakshina Kannada		
20	Jawahar Navodaya Vidyalaya, Davangare		
21	Jawahar Navodaya Vidyalaya, Kalaburagi - I		
22	Jawahar Navodaya Vidyalaya, Kalaburagi - II		
23	Jawahar Navodaya Vidyalaya, Uttara Kannada		
24	Jawahar Navodaya Vidyalaya, Bagalkote		
25	Jawahar Navodaya Vidyalaya, Bijapur		
26	Jawahar Navodaya Vidyalaya, Dharwad		
27	Jawahar Navodaya Vidyalaya, Kodagu		
28	Jawahar Navodaya Vidyalaya, Mysuru		
29	Jawahar Navodaya Vidyalaya, Tumkur		
30	Jawahar Navodaya Vidyalaya, Bangalore Rural		
31	Jawahar Navodaya Vidyalaya, Chikkaballapura		

=== Kerala ===
SL. No.	Name	Established	Website
1	Jawahar Navodaya Vidyalaya, Kollam		
2	Jawahar Navodaya Vidyalaya, Idukki		
3	Jawahar Navodaya Vidyalaya, Ernakulam		
4	Jawahar Navodaya Vidyalaya, Thiruvananthapuram		
5	Jawahar Navodaya Vidyalaya, Thrissur		
6	Jawahar Navodaya Vidyalaya, Pathanamthitta		
7	Jawahar Navodaya Vidyalaya, Palakkad	1988	Jnv palakkad
8	Jawahar Navodaya Vidyalaya, Kozhikode		
9	Jawahar Navodaya Vidyalaya, Kottayam		
10	Jawahar Navodaya Vidyalaya, Alappuzha		
11	Jawahar Navodaya Vidyalaya, Kasaragod		
12	Jawahar Navodaya Vidyalaya, Malappuram		
13	Jawahar Navodaya Vidyalaya, Wayanad		
14	Jawahar Navodaya Vidyalaya, Kannur		

=== Lakshadweep ===
SL. No.	Name	Established	Website
1	Jawahar Navodaya Vidyalaya, Lakshdweep		
2	Jawahar Navodaya Vidyalaya, Minicoy		

=== Puducherry ===
SL. No.	Name	Established	Website
1	Jawahar Navodaya Vidyalaya, Puducherry		
2	Jawahar Navodaya Vidyalaya, Karaikal		
3	Jawahar Navodaya Vidyalaya, Mahe		
4	Jawahar Navodaya Vidyalaya, Yanam		

=== Telangana ===
SL. No.	Name	Established	Website
1	Jawahar Navodaya Vidyalaya, Mahabubnagar		
2	Jawahar Navodaya Vidyalaya, Medak		
3	Jawahar Navodaya Vidyalaya, Karimnagar		
4	Jawahar Navodaya Vidyalaya, Warangal		
5	Jawahar Navodaya Vidyalaya, Khammam		
6	Jawahar Navodaya Vidyalaya, Ranga Reddy		
7	Jawahar Navodaya Vidyalaya, Adilabad (Sirpur)		
8	Jawahar Navodaya Vidyalaya, Nizamabad Dist.		
9	Jawahar Navodaya Vidyalaya, Nalgonda		

== Jaipur Region ==
There are a total of 58 JNVs in Jaipur Region. The state-wise list is follows:

=== Delhi ===
SL. No.	Name	Established	Website
1	Jawahar Navodaya Vidyalaya, North-West Delhi	1986	JNV North-West Delhi
2	Jawahar Navodaya Vidyalaya, South-West Delhi	1991	JNV South-West Delhi

=== Haryana ===
SL. No.	Name	Established	Website
1	Jawahar Navodaya Vidyalaya, Hissar		
2	Jawahar Navodaya Vidyalaya, Jhajjar		
3	Jawahar Navodaya Vidyalaya, Gurugram		
4	Jawahar Navodaya Vidyalaya, Nuh		
5	Jawahar Navodaya Vidyalaya, Jind		
6	Jawahar Navodaya Vidyalaya, Kaithal		
7	Jawahar Navodaya Vidyalaya, Kurukshetra		
8	Jawahar Navodaya Vidyalaya, Mahendragarh		
9	Jawahar Navodaya Vidyalaya, Fatehabad		
10	Jawahar Navodaya Vidyalaya, Karnal		
11	Jawahar Navodaya Vidyalaya, Palwal		
12	Jawahar Navodaya Vidyalaya, Rohtak		
13	Jawahar Navodaya Vidyalaya, Panchkula		
14	Jawahar Navodaya Vidyalaya, Panipat		
15	Jawahar Navodaya Vidyalaya, Rewari		
16	Jawahar Navodaya Vidyalaya, Sirsa		
17	Jawahar Navodaya Vidyalaya, Yamuna Nagar		
18	Jawahar Navodaya Vidyalaya, Ambala		
19	Jawahar Navodaya Vidyalaya, Bhiwani		
20	Jawahar Navodaya Vidyalaya, Sonepat		
21	Jawahar Navodaya Vidyalaya, Faridabad	1986	JNV Faridabad

=== Rajasthan ===
SL. No.	Name	Established	Website
1	Jawahar Navodaya Vidyalaya, Sikar		
2	Jawahar Navodaya Vidyalaya, Pratapgarh		
3	Jawahar Navodaya Vidyalaya, Swai Madhopur		
4	Jawahar Navodaya Vidyalaya, Udaipur		
5	Jawahar Navodaya Vidyalaya, Dungarpur		
6	Jawahar Navodaya Vidyalaya, Banswara		
7	Jawahar Navodaya Vidyalaya, Bhilwara		
8	Jawahar Navodaya Vidyalaya, Churu		
9	Jawahar Navodaya Vidyalaya, Hanumangarh		
10	Jawahar Navodaya Vidyalaya, Jhunjhunu		
11	Jawahar Navodaya Vidyalaya, Nagaur		
12	Jawahar Navodaya Vidyalaya, Sirohi		
13	Jawahar Navodaya Vidyalaya, Tonk		
14	Jawahar Navodaya Vidyalaya, Sriganganagar-I		
15	Jawahar Navodaya Vidyalaya, Sriganganaga-II		
16	Jawahar Navodaya Vidyalaya, Ajmer		
17	Jawahar Navodaya Vidyalaya, Alwar		
18	Jawahar Navodaya Vidyalaya, Banswara		
19	Jawahar Navodaya Vidyalaya, Baran	1987	JNV Baran
20	Jawahar Navodaya Vidyalaya, Barmer		
21	Jawahar Navodaya Vidyalaya, Bharatpur		
22	Jawahar Navodaya Vidyalaya, Bikaner		
23	Jawahar Navodaya Vidyalaya, Bundi		
24	Jawahar Navodaya Vidyalaya, Chittorgarh		
25	Jawahar Navodaya Vidyalaya, Dausa		
26	Jawahar Navodaya Vidyalaya, Dholpur		
27	Jawahar Navodaya Vidyalaya, Jaipur		
28	Jawahar Navodaya Vidyalaya, Jaisalmer		
29	Jawahar Navodaya Vidyalaya, Jalore		
30	Jawahar Navodaya Vidyalaya, Jhalawar		
31	Jawahar Navodaya Vidyalaya, Jodhpur		
32	Jawahar Navodaya Vidyalaya, Karauli		
33	Jawahar Navodaya Vidyalaya, Kota		
34	Jawahar Navodaya Vidyalaya, Pali		
35	Jawahar Navodaya Vidyalaya, Rajsamand		

== Lucknow region ==
There are a total of 89 JNVs in Lucknow Region. The state-wise list is follows:

=== Uttar Pradesh ===
SL. No.	Name	Established	Website
1	Jawahar Navodaya Vidyalaya, Deoria		
2	Jawahar Navodaya Vidyalaya, Etah		
3	Jawahar Navodaya Vidyalaya, Etawah		
4	Jawahar Navodaya Vidyalaya, Fatehpur		
5	Jawahar Navodaya Vidyalaya, Firozabad		
6	Jawahar Navodaya Vidyalaya, Ghazipur		
7	Jawahar Navodaya Vidyalaya, Gonda		
8	Jawahar Navodaya Vidyalaya, Gorakhpur		
9	Jawahar Navodaya Vidyalaya, Hamirpur		
10	Jawahar Navodaya Vidyalaya, Hathras		
11	Jawahar Navodaya Vidyalaya, Jalaun		
12	Jawahar Navodaya Vidyalaya, Jaunpur		
13	Jawahar Navodaya Vidyalaya, Kannauj		
14	Jawahar Navodaya Vidyalaya, Kanpur Dehat		
15	Jawahar Navodaya Vidyalaya, Kasganj		
16	Jawahar Navodaya Vidyalaya, Baghpat		
17	Jawahar Navodaya Vidyalaya, Balrampur		
18	Jawahar Navodaya Vidyalaya, GB Nagar		
19	Jawahar Navodaya Vidyalaya, JP Nagar		
20	Jawahar Navodaya Vidyalaya, Siddharth Nagar		
21	Jawahar Navodaya Vidyalaya, Kushinagar		
22	Jawahar Navodaya Vidyalaya, Lalitpur		
23	Jawahar Navodaya Vidyalaya, Lucknow		
24	Jawahar Navodaya Vidyalaya, Mahoba		
25	Jawahar Navodaya Vidyalaya, Mainpuri	1992	JNV Mainpuri
26	Jawahar Navodaya Vidyalaya, Mathura		
27	Jawahar Navodaya Vidyalaya, Mau		
28	Jawahar Navodaya Vidyalaya, Mirzapur		
29	Jawahar Navodaya Vidyalaya, Moradabad		
30	Jawahar Navodaya Vidyalaya, Pilibhit		
31	Jawahar Navodaya Vidyalaya, Pratapgarh		
32	Jawahar Navodaya Vidyalaya, Prayagraj		
33	Jawahar Navodaya Vidyalaya, Rampur		
34	Jawahar Navodaya Vidyalaya, Sambhal		
35	Jawahar Navodaya Vidyalaya, Santkabir Nagar		
36	Jawahar Navodaya Vidyalaya, Shamli		
37	Jawahar Navodaya Vidyalaya, Shravasti		
38	Jawahar Navodaya Vidyalaya, Sitapur-I		
39	Jawahar Navodaya Vidyalaya, Sitapur-II		
40	Jawahar Navodaya Vidyalaya, Varanasi		
41	Jawahar Navodaya Vidyalaya, Bhadohi		
42	Jawahar Navodaya Vidyalaya, Lakhimpur Kheri		
43	Jawahar Navodaya Vidyalaya, Sultanpur		
44	Jawahar Navodaya Vidyalaya, Hapur		
45	Jawahar Navodaya Vidyalaya, Bijnor		
46	Jawahar Navodaya Vidyalaya, Agra		
47	Jawahar Navodaya Vidyalaya, Auraiya		
48	Jawahar Navodaya Vidyalaya, Barabanki		
49	Jawahar Navodaya Vidyalaya, Chandauli		
50	Jawahar Navodaya Vidyalaya, Faizabad		
51	Jawahar Navodaya Vidyalaya, Ghaziabad		
52	Jawahar Navodaya Vidyalaya, Hardoi		
53	Jawahar Navodaya Vidyalaya, Jhansi		
54	Jawahar Navodaya Vidyalaya, Kanpur Nagar		
55	Jawahar Navodaya Vidyalaya, Kaushambi		
56	Jawahar Navodaya Vidyalaya, Maharajganj		
57	Jawahar Navodaya Vidyalaya, Meerut		
58	Jawahar Navodaya Vidyalaya, Muzaffarnagar		
59	Jawahar Navodaya Vidyalaya, Saharanpur		
60	Jawahar Navodaya Vidyalaya, Shahjahanpur		
61	Jawahar Navodaya Vidyalaya, Sonbhadra		
62	Jawahar Navodaya Vidyalaya, Unnao		
63	Jawahar Navodaya Vidyalaya, Farrukhabad		
64	Jawahar Navodaya Vidyalaya, Raebareli		
65	Jawahar Navodaya Vidyalaya, Aligarh		
66	Jawahar Navodaya Vidyalaya, Ambedakar Nagar		
67	Jawahar Navodaya Vidyalaya, Amethi		
68	Jawahar Navodaya Vidyalaya, Azamgarh		
69	Jawahar Navodaya Vidyalaya, Ballia		
70	Jawahar Navodaya Vidyalaya, Banda		
71	Jawahar Navodaya Vidyalaya, Bareilly		
72	Jawahar Navodaya Vidyalaya, Basti		
73	Jawahar Navodaya Vidyalaya, Bharaich		
74	Jawahar Navodaya Vidyalaya, Badaun		
75	Jawahar Navodaya Vidyalaya, Bulandshahr	1986	
76	Jawahar Navodaya Vidyalaya, Chitrakoot		

=== Uttarakhand ===
SL. No.	Name	Established	Website
1	Jawahar Navodaya Vidyalaya, Pauri Garhwal	2006	JNV Pauri Garhwal
2	Jawahar Navodaya Vidyalaya, Tehri Garhwal	1987	JNV Tehri Garhwal
3	Jawahar Navodaya Vidyalaya, Udham Singh Nagar	1986	JNV Udham Singh Nagar
4	Jawahar Navodaya Vidyalaya, Bageshwar	2004	JNV Bageshwar
5	Jawahar Navodaya Vidyalaya, Haridwar	1993	JNV Haridwar
6	Jawahar Navodaya Vidyalaya, Pithoragarh	2004	JNV Pithoragarh
7	Jawahar Navodaya Vidyalaya, Rudraprayag	1987	JNV Rudraprayag
8	Jawahar Navodaya Vidyalaya, Uttarkashi	1988	JNV Uttarkashi
9	Jawahar Navodaya Vidyalaya, Chamoli	2001	JNV Chamoli
10	Jawahar Navodaya Vidyalaya, Champawat	1998	JNV Champawat
11	Jawahar Navodaya Vidyalaya, Dehradun	2007	JNV Dehradun
12	Jawahar Navodaya Vidyalaya, Nainital	2002	JNV Nainital
13	Jawahar Navodaya Vidyalaya, Almora	1987	JNV Almora

== Patna Region ==
There are a total of 84 JNVs in Patna Region. The state-wise list is follows:

=== Bihar ===
SL. No.	Name	Established	Website
1	Jawahar Navodaya Vidyalaya, Lakhisarai	2006	lakshmisarai
2	Jawahar Navodaya Vidyalaya, Madhepura		
3	Jawahar Navodaya Vidyalaya, Munger		
4	Jawahar Navodaya Vidyalaya, Gaya-I		
5	Jawahar Navodaya Vidyalaya, GAYA-II		
6	Jawahar Navodaya Vidyalaya, East Champaran		
7	Jawahar Navodaya Vidyalaya, Rohtas		
8	Jawahar Navodaya Vidyalaya, Aurangabad		
9	Jawahar Navodaya Vidyalaya, Muzaffarpur		
10	Jawahar Navodaya Vidyalaya, Supaul		
11	Jawahar Navodaya Vidyalaya, Sitamarhi	1994	sitamarhi
12	Jawahar Navodaya Vidyalaya, Madhubani		
13	Jawahar Navodaya Vidyalaya, Khagaria		
14	Jawahar Navodaya Vidyalaya, Jamui		
15	Jawahar Navodaya Vidyalaya, Darbhanga		
16	Jawahar Navodaya Vidyalaya, Begusarai		
17	Jawahar Navodaya Vidyalaya, Araria		
18	Jawahar Navodaya Vidyalaya, Purnea		
19	Jawahar Navodaya Vidyalaya, Nalanda		
20	Jawahar Navodaya Vidyalaya, Nawada		
21	Jawahar Navodaya Vidyalaya, Arwal		
22	Jawahar Navodaya Vidyalaya, Kishanganj		
23	Jawahar Navodaya Vidyalaya, Saharsa		
24	Jawahar Navodaya Vidyalaya, Samastipur		
25	Jawahar Navodaya Vidyalaya, Saran		
26	Jawahar Navodaya Vidyalaya, Sheohar		
27	Jawahar Navodaya Vidyalaya, Shekhpura		
28	Jawahar Navodaya Vidyalaya, Siwan		
29	Jawahar Navodaya Vidyalaya, Vaishali		
30	Jawahar Navodaya Vidyalaya, West Champaran		
31	Jawahar Navodaya Vidyalaya, Banka		
32	Jawahar Navodaya Vidyalaya, Bhagalpur		
33	Jawahar Navodaya Vidyalaya, Bhojpur		
34	Jawahar Navodaya Vidyalaya, Buxar		
35	Jawahar Navodaya Vidyalaya, Patna		
36	Jawahar Navodaya Vidyalaya, Gopalganj		
37	Jawahar Navodaya Vidyalaya, Jehanabad		
38	Jawahar Navodaya Vidyalaya, Kaimur		
39	Jawahar Navodaya Vidyalaya, Katihar		

=== Jharkhand ===
SL. No.	Name	Established	Website
1	Jawahar Navodaya Vidyalaya, Saraikela		
2	Jawahar Navodaya Vidyalaya, Bokaro		
3	Jawahar Navodaya Vidyalaya, Deoghar		
4	Jawahar Navodaya Vidyalaya, Dhanbad		
5	Jawahar Navodaya Vidyalaya, Garhwa		
6	Jawahar Navodaya Vidyalaya, Giridih		
7	Jawahar Navodaya Vidyalaya, Godda		
8	Jawahar Navodaya Vidyalaya, Hazaribagh		
9	Jawahar Navodaya Vidyalaya, Jamtara		
10	Jawahar Navodaya Vidyalaya, Koderma		
11	Jawahar Navodaya Vidyalaya, Latehar		
12	Jawahar Navodaya Vidyalaya, Lohardaga		
13	Jawahar Navodaya Vidyalaya, Pakur-I		
14	Jawahar Navodaya Vidyalaya, Pakur-II		
15	Jawahar Navodaya Vidyalaya, Palamu-I		
16	Jawahar Navodaya Vidyalaya, Palamu-II		
17	Jawahar Navodaya Vidyalaya, Simdega		
18	Jawahar Navodaya Vidyalaya, West Singhbhum		
19	Jawahar Navodaya Vidyalaya, East Singhbhum		
20	Jawahar Navodaya Vidyalaya, Ramgarh		
21	Jawahar Navodaya Vidyalaya, Sahibganj		
22	Jawahar Navodaya Vidyalaya, Chatra		
23	Jawahar Navodaya Vidyalaya, Dumka		
24	Jawahar Navodaya Vidyalaya, Gumla		
25	Jawahar Navodaya Vidyalaya, Khunti		
26	Jawahar Navodaya Vidyalaya, Ranchi		

=== West Bengal ===
SL. No.	Name	Established	Website
1	Jawahar Navodaya Vidyalaya, Cooch Behar	2006	JNV Cooch Behar
2	Jawahar Navodaya Vidyalaya, Alipurduar	2005	JNV Alipurduar
3	Jawahar Navodaya Vidyalaya, Jalpaiguri	2017	JNV Jalpaiguri
4	Jawahar Navodaya Vidyalaya, Darjeeling	1986	JNV Darjeeling
5	Jawahar Navodaya Vidyalaya, Uttar Dinajpur	2005	JNV Uttar Dinajpur
6	Jawahar Navodaya Vidyalaya, Dakshin Dinajpur	2009	JNV Dakshin Dinajpur
7	Jawahar Navodaya Vidyalaya, Murshidabad	2003	JNV Murshidabad
8	Jawahar Navodaya Vidyalaya, Birbhum	2006	JNV Birbhum
9	Jawahar Navodaya Vidyalaya, Nadia	2003	JNV Nadia
10	Jawahar Navodaya Vidyalaya, Burdwan	2003	JNV Burdwan
11	Jawahar Navodaya Vidyalaya, Purulia	2008	JNV Purulia
12	Jawahar Navodaya Vidyalaya, Bankura	2005	JNV Bankura
13	Jawahar Navodaya Vidyalaya, Howrah	2006	JNV Howrah
14	Jawahar Navodaya Vidyalaya, Hooghly	2005	JNV Hoogly
15	Jawahar Navodaya Vidyalaya, East Medinipur	2004	JNV East Medinipur
16	Jawahar Navodaya Vidyalaya, West Medinipur	2006	JNV West Medinipur
17	Jawahar Navodaya Vidyalaya, North 24 Parganas	2003	JNV North 24 Parganas
18	Jawahar Navodaya Vidyalaya, S.24 Parganas-I	1986	JNV S.24 Parganas-I
19	Jawahar Navodaya Vidyalaya, S.24 Parganas-II	2009	JNV S.24 Parganas-II

== Pune Region ==
There are a total of 73 JNVs in Pune Region. The state-wise list is follows:

=== Dadra & Nagar Haveli and Daman & Diu ===
SL. No.	Name	Established	Website
1	Jawahar Navodaya Vidyalaya, Daman	1987	JNV Daman
2	Jawahar Navodaya Vidyalaya, Diu	1986	JNV Diu
3	Jawahar Navodaya Vidyalaya, Silvassa	1986	JNV Silvassa

=== Goa ===
SL. No.	Name	Established	Website
1	Jawahar Navodaya Vidyalaya, South Goa	1986	JNV South Goa
2	Jawahar Navodaya Vidyalaya, North Goa	1988	JNV North Goa

=== Maharashtra ===
SL. No.	Name	Established	Website
1	Jawahar Navodaya Vidyalaya, Satara	1994	JNV Satara
2	Jawahar Navodaya Vidyalaya, Sindhudurg		JNV Sindhudurg
3	Jawahar Navodaya Vidyalaya, Chandrapur	1986	JNV Chandrapur
4	Jawahar Navodaya Vidyalaya, Dhule		JNV Dhule
5	Jawahar Navodaya Vidyalaya, Akola		JNV Akola
6	Jawahar Navodaya Vidyalaya, Amravati		JNV Amravati
7	Jawahar Navodaya Vidyalaya, Bhandara		JNV Bhandara
8	Jawahar Navodaya Vidyalaya, Gadchiroli		JNV Gadchiroli
9	Jawahar Navodaya Vidyalaya, Gondia		JNV Gondia
10	Jawahar Navodaya Vidyalaya, Hingoli		JNV Hingoli
11	Jawahar Navodaya Vidyalaya, Jalna		JNV Jalna
12	Jawahar Navodaya Vidyalaya, Kolhapur		
13	Jawahar Navodaya Vidyalaya, Nagpur	1986	JNV Nagpur
14	Jawahar Navodaya Vidyalaya, Nanded		JNV Nanded
15	Jawahar Navodaya Vidyalaya, Nashik		JNV Nashik
16	Jawahar Navodaya Vidyalaya, Palghar		JNV Palghar
17	Jawahar Navodaya Vidyalaya, Parbhani		JNV Parbhani
18	Jawahar Navodaya Vidyalaya, Pune	2001	JNV Pune
19	Jawahar Navodaya Vidyalaya, Raigad		
20	Jawahar Navodaya Vidyalaya, Ratnagiri		
21	Jawahar Navodaya Vidyalaya, Aurangabad		
22	Jawahar Navodaya Vidyalaya, Wardha		
23	Jawahar Navodaya Vidyalaya, Ahmednagar	1987	JNV Ahmednagar
24	Jawahar Navodaya Vidyalaya, Washim		
25	Jawahar Navodaya Vidyalaya, Yavatmal		
26	Jawahar Navodaya Vidyalaya, Beed		
27	Jawahar Navodaya Vidyalaya, Buldhana		
28	Jawahar Navodaya Vidyalaya, Jalgaon		
29	Jawahar Navodaya Vidyalaya, Latur		
30	Jawahar Navodaya Vidyalaya, Nandurbar-I		
31	Jawahar Navodaya Vidyalaya, Nandurbar-II		
32	Jawahar Navodaya Vidyalaya, Osmanabad		
33	Jawahar Navodaya Vidyalaya, Solapur		
34	Jawahar Navodaya Vidyalaya, Sangli		

=== Gujarat ===
SL. No.	Name	Established	Website
1	Jawahar Navodaya Vidyalaya, Kutch		
2	Jawahar Navodaya Vidyalaya, Mehsana		
3	Jawahar Navodaya Vidyalaya, Narmada		
4	Jawahar Navodaya Vidyalaya, Patan		JNV Patan
5	Jawahar Navodaya Vidyalaya, Aravalli		
6	Jawahar Navodaya Vidyalaya, Gandhinagar		
7	Jawahar Navodaya Vidyalaya, Navsari		
8	Jawahar Navodaya Vidyalaya, Sabarkantha		
9	Jawahar Navodaya Vidyalaya, Porbandar	1986	JNV Porbandar
10	Jawahar Navodaya Vidyalaya, Rajkot		
11	Jawahar Navodaya Vidyalaya, Junagadh		
12	Jawahar Navodaya Vidyalaya, Anand		
13	Jawahar Navodaya Vidyalaya, Bhavnagar		
14	Jawahar Navodaya Vidyalaya, Gir Somnath		
15	Jawahar Navodaya Vidyalaya, Mahisagar		
16	Jawahar Navodaya Vidyalaya, Panchmahal		
17	Jawahar Navodaya Vidyalaya, Surendranagar		
18	Jawahar Navodaya Vidyalaya, Tapi		
19	Jawahar Navodaya Vidyalaya, Vadodara		
20	Jawahar Navodaya Vidyalaya, Valsad		
21	Jawahar Navodaya Vidyalaya, Surat		
22	Jawahar Navodaya Vidyalaya, Devbhumi Dwarka		
23	Jawahar Navodaya Vidyalaya, Botad		
24	Jawahar Navodaya Vidyalaya, Dahod		
25	Jawahar Navodaya Vidyalaya, Dang		
26	Jawahar Navodaya Vidyalaya, Jamnagar		
27	Jawahar Navodaya Vidyalaya, Kheda		
28	Jawahar Navodaya Vidyalaya, Bharuch		
29	Jawahar Navodaya Vidyalaya, Dahod		
30	Jawahar Navodaya Vidyalaya, Amreli		
31	Jawahar Navodaya Vidyalaya, Ahmedabad		
32	Jawahar Navodaya Vidyalaya, Banaskantha		
33	Jawahar Navodaya Vidyalaya, Chhota Udepur		
34	Jawahar Navodaya Vidyalaya, Morbi		

== Shillong Region ==
There are a total of 98 JNVs in Shillong Region. The state-wise list is follows:

=== Arunachal Pradesh ===
SL. No.	Name	Established	Website
1	Jawahar Navodaya Vidyalaya, Upper Siang	2005	JNV Upper Siang
2	Jawahar Navodaya Vidyalaya, East Kameng		
3	Jawahar Navodaya Vidyalaya, Lower Dibang Valley		
4	Jawahar Navodaya Vidyalaya, Longding (Tirap)		
5	Jawahar Navodaya Vidyalaya, East Siang		
6	Jawahar Navodaya Vidyalaya, Changlang		
7	Jawahar Navodaya Vidyalaya, Lower Subansiri		
8	Jawahar Navodaya Vidyalaya, Tawang		
9	Jawahar Navodaya Vidyalaya, Anjaw		
10	Jawahar Navodaya Vidyalaya, West Siang		
11	Jawahar Navodaya Vidyalaya, Tirap		
12	Jawahar Navodaya Vidyalaya, West Kameng		
13	Jawahar Navodaya Vidyalaya, Namsai		
14	Jawahar Navodaya Vidyalaya, Upper Subansiri	1987	JNV Upper Subansiri
15	Jawahar Navodaya Vidyalaya, Dibang Valley		
16	Jawahar Navodaya Vidyalaya, Kurung Kumey		
17	Jawahar Navodaya Vidyalaya, Papumpare		

=== Assam ===
SL. No.	Name	Established	Website
1	Jawahar Navodaya Vidyalaya, Dhemaji	2001	
2	Jawahar Navodaya Vidyalaya, Dibrugarh	1994	
3	Jawahar Navodaya Vidyalaya, Goalpara	1997	
4	Jawahar Navodaya Vidyalaya, Golaghat	1995	jnvgolaghat.in
5	Jawahar Navodaya Vidyalaya, Jorhat	1995	
6	Jawahar Navodaya Vidyalaya, Kamrup	1994	
7	Jawahar Navodaya Vidyalaya, Karimganj	1993	
8	Jawahar Navodaya Vidyalaya, Kokrajhar	1995	
9	Jawahar Navodaya Vidyalaya, Lakhimpur	1996	
10	Jawahar Navodaya Vidyalaya, Morigaon	1995	
11	Jawahar Navodaya Vidyalaya, Nalbari	1994	
12	Jawahar Navodaya Vidyalaya, Sivasagar	1994	
13	Jawahar Navodaya Vidyalaya, Tinsukia	1995	
14	Jawahar Navodaya Vidyalaya, Dima Hasao (N C Hills)	2006	
15	Jawahar Navodaya Vidyalaya, Bongaigaon	2006	
16	Jawahar Navodaya Vidyalaya, Udalguri	2006	
17	Jawahar Navodaya Vidyalaya, Nagaon	2006	
18	Jawahar Navodaya Vidyalaya, West Karbi Anglong	2009	
19	Jawahar Navodaya Vidyalaya, Hailakandi	1997	
20	Jawahar Navodaya Vidyalaya, Dhubri	2007	
21	Jawahar Navodaya Vidyalaya, Biswanath	1994	
22	Jawahar Navodaya Vidyalaya, Karbi Anglong	1995	
23	Jawahar Navodaya Vidyalaya, Baksa	2006	
24	Jawahar Navodaya Vidyalaya, Cachar	1994	JNV Cachar
25	Jawahar Navodaya Vidyalaya, Barpeta	1995	
26	Jawahar Navodaya Vidyalaya, Chirang	2001	
27	Jawahar Navodaya Vidyalaya, Darrang	1995	

=== Manipur ===
SL. No.	Name	Established	Website
1	Jawahar Navodaya Vidyalaya, Senapati-I	1988	JNV Senapati-I
2	Jawahar Navodaya Vidyalaya, Ukhrul		
3	Jawahar Navodaya Vidyalaya, Bishnupur		
4	Jawahar Navodaya Vidyalaya, Churachandpur		
5	Jawahar Navodaya Vidyalaya, Imphal East		
6	Jawahar Navodaya Vidyalaya, Kangpokpi		
7	Jawahar Navodaya Vidyalaya, Ukhrul		
8	Jawahar Navodaya Vidyalaya, Imphal West		
9	Jawahar Navodaya Vidyalaya, Tamenglong		
10	Jawahar Navodaya Vidyalaya, Thoubal		
11	Jawahar Navodaya Vidyalaya, Chandel		

=== Meghalaya ===
SL. No.	Name	Established	Website
1	Jawahar Navodaya Vidyalaya, North Garo Hills		
2	Jawahar Navodaya Vidyalaya, South Garo Hills		
3	Jawahar Navodaya Vidyalaya, West Jaintia Hills		
4	Jawahar Navodaya Vidyalaya, South-West Khasi Hills		
5	Jawahar Navodaya Vidyalaya, East Garo Hills		
6	Jawahar Navodaya Vidyalaya, Ri Bhoi		
7	Jawahar Navodaya Vidyalaya, East Jaintia Hills		
8	Jawahar Navodaya Vidyalaya, South-West Garo Hills		
9	Jawahar Navodaya Vidyalaya, West Garo Hills		
10	Jawahar Navodaya Vidyalaya, East Khasi Hills-I		
11	Jawahar Navodaya Vidyalaya, East Khasi Hills-II		
12	Jawahar Navodaya Vidyalaya, West Khasi Hills		

=== Mizoram ===
SL. No.	Name	Established	Website
1	Jawahar Navodaya Vidyalaya, Kolasib		
2	Jawahar Navodaya Vidyalaya, Saiha		
3	Jawahar Navodaya Vidyalaya, Serchhip		
4	Jawahar Navodaya Vidyalaya, Lunglei		
5	Jawahar Navodaya Vidyalaya, Champhai		
6	Jawahar Navodaya Vidyalaya, Lawngtlai		
7	Jawahar Navodaya Vidyalaya, Mamit		
8	Jawahar Navodaya Vidyalaya, Aizawl		

=== Nagaland ===
SL. No.	Name	Established	Website
1	Jawahar Navodaya Vidyalaya, Zunheboto		
2	Jawahar Navodaya Vidyalaya, Kohima		
3	Jawahar Navodaya Vidyalaya, Longleng		
4	Jawahar Navodaya Vidyalaya, Mon		
5	Jawahar Navodaya Vidyalaya, Peren		
6	Jawahar Navodaya Vidyalaya, Phek		
7	Jawahar Navodaya Vidyalaya, Tuensang		
8	Jawahar Navodaya Vidyalaya, Dimapur		
9	Jawahar Navodaya Vidyalaya, Kiphire		
10	JNV, Mokokchung		
11	Jawahar Navodaya Vidyalaya, Wokha		

=== Sikkim ===
SL. No.	Name	Established	Website
1	JNV East Sikkim		
2	JNV South Sikkim		
3	JNV North Sikkim	1993	
4	JNV West Sikkim		

=== Tripura ===
SL. No.	Name	Established	Website
1	Jawahar Navodaya Vidyalaya, Khowai		
2	Jawahar Navodaya Vidyalaya, South Tripura		
3	Jawahar Navodaya Vidyalaya, Unokoti		
4	Jawahar Navodaya Vidyalaya, Sepahijala		
5	Jawahar Navodaya Vidyalaya, West Tripura		
6	Jawahar Navodaya Vidyalaya, North Tripura		
7	Jawahar Navodaya Vidyalaya, Gomati		
8	Jawahar Navodaya Vidyalaya, Dhalai		
