= Jawaharnagar =

Jawaharnagar or Jawahar Nagar may refer to these places in India named after its first prime minister Jawaharlal Nehru:

- Jawahar Nagar, a neighbourhood of Chennai, Tamil Nadu, India
- Jawaharnagar (Gujarat Refinery), a town and oil refinery in Gujarat, India
- Jawahar Nagar, Jaisalmer, a village in Jaisalmer, Rajasthan, India
- Jawahar Nagar, Srinagar, a locality in Srinagar, Jammu and Kashmir, India
- Jawaharnagar, Telangana, a city in Ranga Reddy district, Telangana, India
  - Jawaharnagar Municipal Corporation, municipal corporation of the city
- Jawaharnagar railway station, Tripura, India
