= C. G. Prince =

Indian sculptor (1961)

C. G. Prince സി ജി പ്രിൻസ്
- Born: 25 May 1961; Thrissur, Kerala
- Died: 24 May 2023 (aged 62); Thrissur, Kerala
- Education: St. Thomas College, Thrissur
- Occupations: Sculptor, Writer
- Years active: 1990 – present
- Awards: Olympus Camera Award

C. G. Prince (born 25 May 1961) is an Indian sculptor, based in Kerala. His Birds from my moms Kitchen Cupboard is a well received series. He is also known as a poet and documentary filmmaker, He graduated in BA English literature & History from St. Thomas College, Thrissur Prince crafted a huge elephant of steel in the Nehru Park, Thrissur. The elephant is a main attraction of the Nehru park; it is about 16 feet high and cost a high amount., Prince has also made some notable documentary films like Naadodi Nomad on Dr. Chummar Choondal; the documentary on Chummar Choondal throws light on his invaluable contributions in promoting folk art forms. He has done the painting with drip method in the 1000 sqft canvas titled "Flowers for children" to support the children those who affected flood in kerala 2018

== Exhibitions ==
- 2000- Don Bosco Boys Town, Karen Nairobi, Kenya
- 2015- Kerala Sangeeta Nataka academy Solo Exhibition Paintings & Sculptures
- 2008- Robert Thomas- Galaxy international, USA
- 2005- Sister of St. Augustine, Kenya

== Work Collections at ==
Don Bosco Boy's Town, Karen Nairobi Kanya
Dr. Rick Lippin USA & Robert Thomas- Galaxy international USA
Kokin- Ryu Souke Myabi- Daike' Japanese Traditional Drum Group, Tokyo Japan
Sister of St. Augustine Kanya
