= JNS =

JNS may refer to:

== News agency ==
- Jerusalem News Syndicate, formerly Jewish News Syndicate, news agency and wire service

== Places ==
- Jawaharlal Nehru Stadium (disambiguation)
- Narsaq Heliport, in Greenland
- Jamnabai Narsee School, in Mumbai, India

== Politics ==
- Yugoslav National Party

== Health ==
- Journal of Neurosurgery

== Language ==
- Jaunsari language

== Other ==
- Curtiss JNS, a biplane
- JNS, a name related to girl group Jeans
