= JNB =

JNB may refer to:

- O. R. Tambo International Airport, the IATA code JNB
- Jawaharlal Nehru Biological Park, a zoological garden located in Bokaro Steel City, Jharkhand, India

== See also ==
- J. N. B. Crim House, the United States historic place
- J. N. B. Hewitt, an American linguist
