= Jawahar Navodaya Vidyalaya, North Goa =

School in North Goa, India

- JNV Valpoi

Location
- Valpoi, North Goa; Goa, 403506; India; 15°31′11″N 74°08′16″E

Information
- Type: Public
- Motto: प्रज्ञानं ब्रह्म (Sanskrit); Pragñānam Brahma (ISO) transl. "Pure Knowledge is Brahma"
- Established: October 10, 1988; 38 years ago
- Principal: V.S. Prabhullan
- Vice Principal: M.R. Suryavamshi
- Staff: 19
- Faculty: 24
- Grades: VI - XII
- Enrollment: 293 (2018)
- Campus size: 30 acres (121406 Sq. Mts)
- Campus type: Rural
- Houses: Aravali; Nilgiri; Shivalik; Udaygiri
- Affiliation: CBSE
- Website: www.jnvnorthgoa.gov.in

Jawahar Navodaya Vidyalaya, North Goa or locally known as JNV Valpoi is a boarding, co-educational school in North Goa district of Goa state in India. Navodaya Vidyalayas are funded by the Indian Ministry of Human Resources Development and administered by Navodaya Vidyalaya Smiti, an autonomous body under the ministry.

== History ==
The school was established in 1988, and is a part of Jawahar Navodaya Vidyalaya schools which provide free education to gifted children. The school shifted to its permanent campus on 10 February 2002. This school is administered and monitored by Pune regional office of Navodaya Vidyalaya Smiti.

== Admission ==
Admission to JNV North Goa at class VI level is made through selection test conducted by Navodaya Vidyalaya Samiti. The information about test is disseminated and advertised in North Goa district by the office of North Goa district magistrate (Collector), who is also chairperson of Vidyalya Management Committee.

== Affiliations ==
JNV North Goa is affiliated to Central Board of Secondary Education with affiliation number 2840002.

== See also ==
- Jawahar Navodaya Vidyalaya, South Goa
- List of JNV schools
