= Jawahar Navodaya Vidyalaya Medak =

Jawahar Navodaya Vidyalaya, Medak
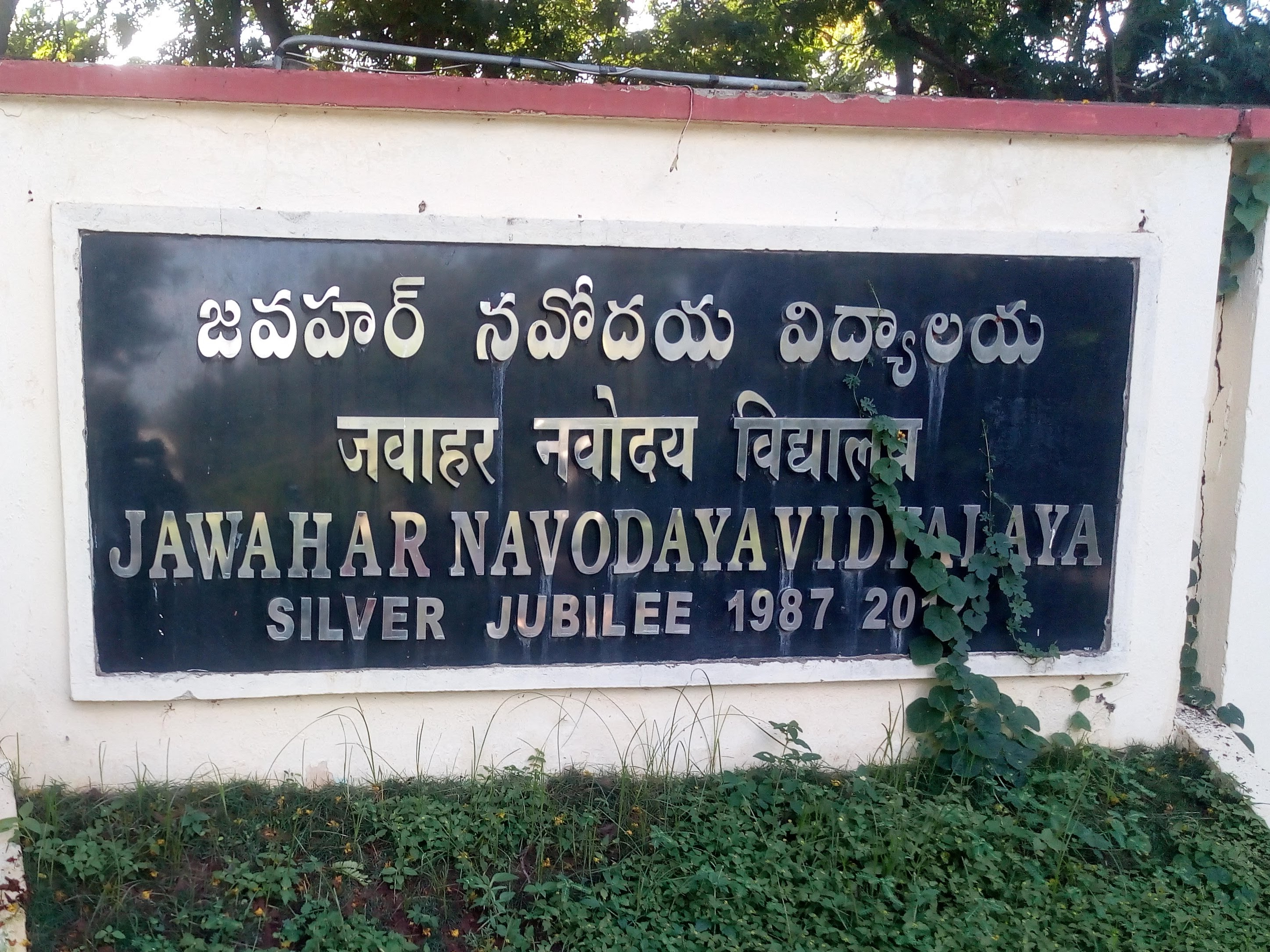
- Medak

Information
- Type: Public
- Motto: Pragyanam Brahma
- Established: 1987
- Principal: D. Rajendhar
- Grades: Class 6 - 12
- Enrollment: 464
- Campus size: 32-acre (130,000 m^{2})
- Campus type: Rural
- Affiliation: C.B.S.E.
- Website: https://www.navodaya.gov.in/nvs/nvs-school/MEDAK/en/home/

Jawahar Navodaya Vidyalaya, Medak ( Telugu: జవహర్ నవోదయ విద్యాలయము, వర్గల్ ) (Hindi: जवाहर नवोदय विद्यालय) known as JNV Wargal or JNV Medak is a central government co-education school located in Wargal, Medak. The School is an autonomous body under the Ministry of Education, Government of India. Navodaya Vidyalayas are funded by the Indian Ministry of Human Resources Development and administered by Navodaya Vidyalaya Smiti, an autonomous body under the ministry.

== History ==
Jawahar Navodaya Vidyalaya Medak was established in the year 1987, following the National Policy of Education: 1986.

== Admissions ==
Admissions to JNV Medak are made through Jawahar Navodaya Vidyalaya Selection Test (JNVST). The test is conducted for class 6 and 9 admissions. This test contains reasoning, math and Hindi. Earlier the entrance form was available on every 'Navodaya Vidyalaya' free of cost mostly in month of October. But from a few years, Navodaya Vidyalaya Samiti has started taking online applications. While applying for admissions in Jawahar Navodaya Vidyalayas, the student must be studying in 5th standard in a school affiliated by central or state government. There is also a provision of lateral entry for students who want to join JNV's from 9th standards. The students must be studying in 8th class while applying to appear in the entrance exam, which is similar to that of JNVST for 6th admissions, however syllabus will be of difficulty level of 8th standard.

== See also ==
- Navodaya Vidyalaya Samiti
