= Jawahar Navodaya Vidyalaya, Puducherry =

School in Puducherry district, India

- JNV Puducherry

Location
- Periya Kalapet, Puducherry district Puducherry U.T., 605014; India; 12°02′08″N 79°51′10″E

Information
- Type: Public
- Motto: Pragyanam Brahma (Consciousness is Brahman)
- Established: 1986
- Principal: P Ramachandran
- Vice Principal: C Uma Maheswari
- Staff: 17
- Faculty: 28
- Grades: VI - XII
- Enrollment: 507
- Campus size: 30 acre (121,406 sqm)
- Campus type: Rural
- Affiliation: CBSE
- Website: navodaya.gov.in/nvs/nvs-school/Puducherry/en/home/

Jawahar Navodaya Vidyalaya, Puducherry or locally known as JNV Kalapet is a boarding, co-educational school in Puducherry district of Puducherry U.T. in India. Navodaya Vidyalayas are funded by the Indian Ministry of Human Resources Development and administered by Navodaya Vidyalaya Smiti, an autonomous body under the ministry. Navodaya Vidyalayas provide free education to talented children from Class VI to XII. Puducherry district is a coastal enclave within Tamil Nadu state.

== History ==
The school was established in 1986, and is a part of Jawahar Navodaya Vidyalaya schools. This school is administered and monitored by Hyderabad regional office of Navodaya Vidyalaya Smiti.

== Admission ==
Admission to JNV Puducherry at class VI level is made through selection test (JNVST) conducted by Navodaya Vidyalaya Smiti. The information about test is disseminated and advertised in district by the office of Puducherry district magistrate (Collector), who is also the chairperson of Vidyalya Management Committee (VMC).

== Affiliations ==
JNV Puducherry is affiliated to Central Board of Secondary Education with affiliation number 2940001.

== See also ==
- List of Jawahar Navodaya Vidyalayas
