= List of things named after Rajiv Gandhi =

The following things have been named after Rajiv Gandhi, who was the Prime Minister of India from 1984 to 1989. A Right to Information query raised in 2013 was answered saying that over 450 schemes, building, projects, institutions, etc. were named after the three family members (Jawaharlal Nehru, Indira Gandhi and Rajiv Gandhi) of the Nehru–Gandhi family.

== Airports ==
- Rajiv Gandhi International Airport at Hyderabad, Telangana.

== Awards ==
- Rajiv Gandhi National Quality Award
- Rajiv Gandhi National Sadbhavana Award

== Educational institutions ==
- Assam Rajiv Gandhi University of Cooperative Management, Sivasagar, Assam
- Rajiv Gandhi Science Centre, Mauritius
- Rajeev Gandhi Memorial Boarding School, Sheopur, Madhya Pradesh
- Rajiv Gandhi Academy for Aviation Technology, Trivandrum, Kerala
- Rajiv Gandhi Centre for Biotechnology, Thiruvananthapuram, Kerala.
- Rajiv Gandhi College of Engineering, Sriperumbudur, Tamil Nadu
- Rajiv Gandhi College of Engineering and Technology, Puducherry
- Rajiv Gandhi College of Veterinary and Animal Sciences, Puducherry
- Rajiv Gandhi Degree College, Rajahmundry, Andhra Pradesh
- Rajiv Gandhi Education City, Sonipat, Haryana
- Rajiv Gandhi Foundation, Delhi
- Rajiv Gandhi Government Engineering College Kangra, Himachal Pradesh
- Rajiv Gandhi Government Polytechnic, Itanagar, Arunachal Pradesh
- Rajiv Gandhi Institute of Medical Sciences, Adilabad, Telangana
- Rajiv Gandhi Institute of Medical Sciences, Ongole, Andhra Pradesh
- Rajiv Gandhi Institute of Medical Sciences, Srikakulam, Andhra Pradesh
- Rajiv Gandhi Institute of Petroleum Technology, Rae Bareli, Uttar Pradesh.
- Rajiv Gandhi Institute of Pharmacy, Trikaripur, Kerala
- Rajiv Gandhi Institute of Technology, Kottayam, Kerala
- Rajiv Gandhi Institute of Technology, Mumbai, Maharashtra
- Rajiv Gandhi Medical College, Kalwa, Maharashtra
- Rajiv Gandhi National Aviation University, Raebareli, Uttar Pradesh
- Rajiv Gandhi National Cyber Law Center, Delhi
- Rajiv Gandhi National University of Law, Patiala, Punjab
- Rajiv Gandhi Polytechnic, Kavalkhed, Udgir, Maharashtra
- Rajiv Gandhi Proudyogiki Vishwavidyalaya, Bhopal, Madhya Pradesh
- Rajiv Gandhi School of Intellectual Property Law, Kharagpur
- Rajiv Gandhi Technical University, at Bhopal, Madhya Pradesh.
- Rajiv Gandhi University, Doimukh, Arunachal Pradesh.
- Rajiv Gandhi University of Health Sciences, Bangalore, Karnataka.
- Rajiv Gandhi University of Knowledge Technologies, Basar, Telangana
- Rajiv Gandhi University of Knowledge Technologies, Nuzvid, Andhra Pradesh
- Rajiv Gandhi University of Knowledge Technologies, Srikakulam, Andhra Pradesh
- Rajiv Gandhi University of Knowledge Technologies, RK Valley, Andhra Pradesh
- Rajiv Gandhi University of Knowledge Technologies, Ongole, Andhra Pradesh

== Hospitals ==
- Rajiv Gandhi Cancer Institute and Research Centre, Delhi
- Rajiv Gandhi Government General Hospital, at Chennai, Tamil Nadu.
- Rajiv Gandhi Government Women and Children's Hospital, Pondicherry
- Rajiv Gandhi Chest Hospital, Bengaluru

== Sports stadiums ==
- Rajiv Gandhi Indoor Stadium, Kochi, Ernakulam, Kerala
- Rajiv Gandhi Stadium, Belapur, Navi Mumbai.
- Rajiv Gandhi International Cricket Stadium, Dehradun, Uttarakhand.
- Rajiv Gandhi International Cricket Stadium, Hyderabad, Telangana.
- Rajiv Gandhi Sports Complex, Rohtak, Haryana
- Rajiv Gandhi Stadium, Aizawl, Mizoram.

== Museums ==
- Rajiv Gandhi Garden, Udaipur, Rajasthan
- Rajiv Gandhi Regional Museum of Natural History, Sawai Madhopur, Rajasthan
- Rajiv Smruthi Bhavan, Visakhapatnam
- Rajiv Gandhi Wild Life Sanctuary, (Formerly known as Nagarjunasagar - Srisailam Tiger Reserve), Andhra Pradesh

== Schemes ==
- Rajiv Gandhi Equity Savings Scheme
- Rajiv Yuva Kiranalu
- Rajiv Gandhi Panchayat Sashaktikaran Abhiyan
- Rajiv Gandhi Grameen Vidyutikaran Yojana

== Others ==
- Rajiv Chowk, the official name of Connaught Place, Delhi
- Rajiv Gandhi Charitable Trust, Delhi
- Rajiv Gandhi Container Terminal, at Kochi, Kerala.
- Rajiv Gandhi Bhawan, Delhi
- Rajiv Gandhi Combined Cycle Power Project, at Alappuzha district, Kerala.
- Rajiv Gandhi Infotech Park, Pune, Maharashtra
- Rajiv Gandhi National Institute of Youth Development, Delhi
- Rajiv Gandhi Memorial, Sriperumbudur, Tamil Nadu
- Rajiv Gandhi Salai, Chennai
- Rajiv Gandhi Setu, Mumbai
- Rajiv Gandhi Thermal Power Station

== See also ==
- List of things named after prime ministers of India
- List of things named after Jawaharlal Nehru
- List of things named after Indira Gandhi
