= Kaushala Prasad Mishra =

Indian radiation biologist and academic leader

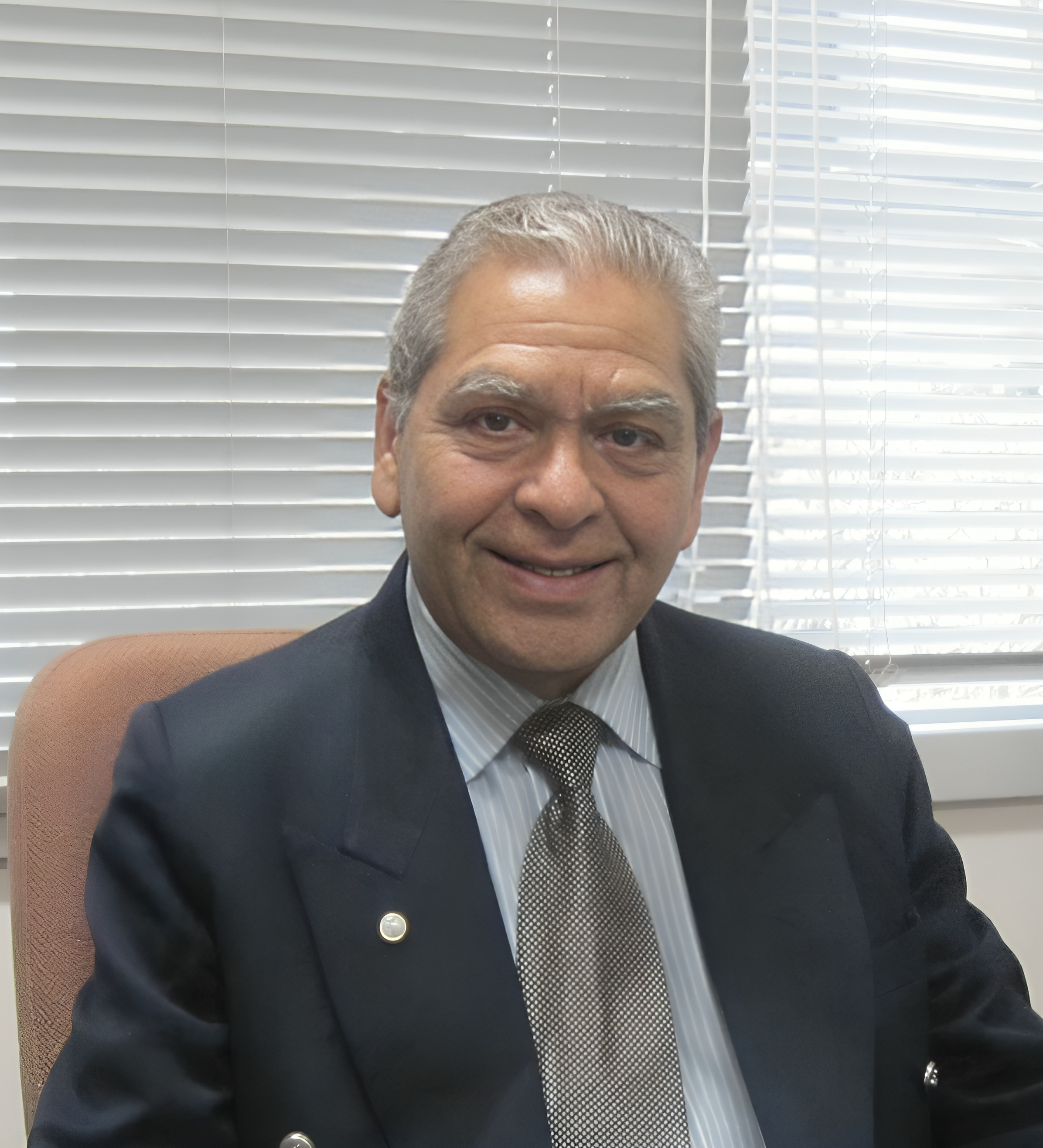
- Born: Allahabad, Uttar Pradesh, India
- Education: University of Allahabad; Gujarat University
- Known for: Research in radiation biology, radioprotection
- Awards: Homi Jahangir Bhabha Memorial Award, AARR Award, Prof. S.N. Ghosh Memorial Award
- Scientific career
- Fields: Radiation biology, Chemistry, Life sciences
- Workplaces: Bhabha Atomic Research Centre; Hiroshima University; Nehru Gram Bharati University; Mumbai University

Kaushala Prasad Mishra is an Indian scientist in the field of radiation biology. He served as the Head of the Radiation Biology and Health Sciences Division at the Bhabha Atomic Research Centre (BARC), Mumbai, and as the Vice Chancellor of Nehru Gram Bharati University, Prayagraj. Mishra has held multiple academic and leadership positions in national and international scientific societies. He is the founding president of the Society for Radiation Research (SRR) and a former president of the Asian Association for Radiation Research (AARR).

== Early life and education ==
Mishra was born in Allahabad (now Prayagraj), Uttar Pradesh. He completed his M.Sc. in Chemistry from the University of Allahabad in 1968 and received a Ph.D. in Biophysics from Gujarat University in 1979. He was part of the 12th batch of the BARC Training School in Nuclear Science and Technology (Chemistry stream).

== Career ==
Mishra began his scientific career in 1969 at the BARC through 12th batch Training School in Chemistry as a Scientific Officer. His work involved research on molecular radiobiology, oxidative stress, and radiation-induced cellular damage. He was later appointed Head of the Radiation Biology and Health Sciences Division and retired in 2006 as Scientific Officer H+.

Following retirement, he served as Vice Chancellor of Nehru Gram Bharati University from 2010 to 2014. He has been a visiting professor at institutions in Japan, the USA, Germany, Russia, France, and China, including an appointment as Distinguished Visiting Professor at Hiroshima University.

== Research and mentorship ==
Mishra has published over 350 articles in peer-reviewed journals and edited seven books in the field of radiation biology. He has supervised 51 doctoral students.

== Awards and honours ==
- Homi Jahangir Bhabha Memorial Award and Bhabha Medal by the 108th Indian Science Congress Association (2023)
- AARR Award in Biology and Medicine (Kazakhstan, 2017)
- Prof. S.N. Ghosh Memorial Award from IETE (2019)
- Fellow of the National Academy of Sciences, India (NASI)
- Fellow of the International Academy of Physical Sciences
- Fellow of the Maharashtra Academy of Sciences

== Professional affiliations ==
- Founder President, Society for Radiation Research (SRR)
- President, Asian Association for Radiation Research (2017–2021)
- Vice president, Asian Association for Radiation Research (2012–2017).
- Council Member, International Association for Radiation Research (2017–2021; 2024–2027)
- President, Indian Biophysical Society (2005–2008)
- President, Microscopy Society of India
- President, New Biology Section, 88th Indian Science Congress (2001)
- Fellow of Maharashtra Academy of Sciences
- Fellow, International Academy of Physical Sciences

Mishra was also a member of the National Disaster Management Authority’s core group for nuclear and chemical disaster preparedness.

== Editorial responsibilities ==
He is Editor-in-Chief of the Journal of Radiation and Cancer Research and serves on editorial boards of journals such as the International Journal of Radiation Biology and the World Journal of Radiology.

== Recent roles ==
As of 2024, he serves as:

- Chairman, Academic Programs and Membership Development, AARR (2022–2026)
- Executive Council Member, World Intellectual Wisdom Forum (WIWF), Paris (2019–present)
