= List of things named after Indira Gandhi =

The following things have been named after Indira Gandhi, who was Prime Minister of India from 1966 to 1977 and from 1980 until her assassination in 1984. A Right to Information query raised in 2013 was answered saying that over 450 schemes, building, projects, institutions, etc. were named after the three family members (Jawaharlal Nehru, Indira Gandhi and Rajiv Gandhi) of Nehru–Gandhi family.

== Awards, prizes, and competitions ==
- Indira Gandhi Award for Best Debut Film of a Director
- Indira Gandhi Award for National Integration
- Indira Gandhi Boat Race
- Indira Gandhi Paryavaran Puraskar
- Indira Gandhi Prize

== Event venues ==
- Indira Gandhi Arena
- Indira Gandhi Athletic Stadium
- Indira Gandhi International Sports Stadium, Haldwani, Uttarakhand
- Indira Gandhi National Centre for the Arts
- Indira Gandhi Stadium, Alwar
- Indira Gandhi Stadium, Solapur
- Indira Gandhi Stadium (Una)
- Indira Gandhi Stadium, Vijayawada
- Indira Priyadarshini Stadium
- Indira Gandhi Centre for Indian Culture, Phoenix, Mauritius

== Hospitals ==
- Indira Gandhi Childrens Hospital
- Indira Gandhi Co-operative Hospital
- Indira Gandhi Institute of Medical Sciences
- Indira Gandhi Medical College
- Indira Gandhi Memorial Hospital
- North Eastern Indira Gandhi Regional Institute of Health and Medical Sciences

== Government programmes ==
=== Current ===
- Indira Gandhi National Old Age Pension Scheme
- Indira Canteens

=== Former ===
Central Government Schemes

1. Indira Awas Yojana - Ministry of Rural Areas and Environment – This scheme was a CSS funded on cost-sharing basis between the Centre and the States in the ratio of 75:25. In the case of UTs, the entire funds are provided by Centre. The scheme was targeted to provide housing to the population below poverty line living in rural areas, particularly those belonging to SC/ST and freed bonded labourers.
2. Indira Gandhi National Old Age Pension Scheme – To Provide Social Security to workers in the Unorganized Sector in a Phased Manner.
3. Indira Gandhi Canal Project (Funded by World Bank)
4. Indira Kisan Vikas Patra
5. Indira Gandhi Garib Kalyan Yojna

State Government Schemes

1. Indira Gandhi Utkrishtha Chhattervritti Yojna for Post Plus Two Students - Himachal Pradesh Government (Sponsored by Central Government)
2. Indira Gandhi Women Protection Scheme - Maharashtra Government
3. Indira Gandhi Prathisthan - Housing and Urban Planning Department - Uttar Pradesh Government
4. Indira Kranthi Patham Scheme - Andhra Pradesh Government
5. Indira Gandhi Nahar Pariyojana Scheme - Kerala Government
6. Indira Gandhi Vruddha Bhumiheen Shetmajoor Anudan Yojana - Maharashtra Government
7. Indira Gandhi Nahar Project (IGNP), Jaisalmer - Rajasthan Government
8. Indira Gandhi Niradhar Yojna - Maharashtra Government
9. Indira Gandhi Kuppam - Kerala Government - Welfare Scheme for Tsunami effected fishermen
10. Indira Gandhi Drinking Water Scheme, 2006 - Haryana Government
11. Indira Gandhi Niradhar Old, Landless, Destitute women farm labour Scheme -Maharashtra Government
12. Indira Gandhi Women Protection Scheme -Maharashtra Government
13. Indira Gaon Ganga Yojana - Chhattisgarh Government
14. Indira Sahara Yojana - Chhattisgarh Government
15. Indira Soochna Shakti Yojana - Chhattisgarh Government
16. Indira Gandhi Balika Suraksha Yojana - Himachal Pradesh Government
17. Indira Gandhi Garibi Hatao Yojana (DPIP) - Madhya Pradesh Government
18. Indira Gandhi super thermal power project - Haryana Government
19. Indira Gandhi Water Project - Haryana Government
20. Indira Gandhi Sagar Project, Bhandara District Gosikhurd -Maharashtra Government
21. Indira Jeevitha Bima Pathakam - Andhra Pradesh Government
22. Indira Gandhi Priyadarshani Vivah Shagun Yojana - Haryana Government
23. Indira Mahila Yojana Scheme - Meghalaya Government
24. Indira Gandhi Calf Rearing Scheme - Chhattisgarh Government
25. Indira Gandhi Priyadarshini Vivah Shagun Yojana - Haryana Government
26. Indira Gandhi Calf Rearing Scheme - Andhra Pradesh Government - It helped most of the respondent families in acquiring female calves through this scheme.
27. Indira Gandhi Landless Agriculture Labour scheme - Maharashtra Government

== Museums and parks ==
- Indira Gandhi Planetarium
- Indira Gandhi Rashtriya Manav Sangrahalaya
- Indira Gandhi Zoological Park
- Indira Gandhi Stadium, Una

== Transport infrastructure ==
- Indira Gandhi Canal
- Indira Gandhi International Airport
- Annai Indira Gandhi Road Bridge
- Indira canteen

== Universities, colleges, and research institutes ==
- Indira Gandhi Agricultural University
- Indira Priyadarshini Government Degree College for Women (Hyderabad)
- Indira Gandhi Centre for Atomic Research
- Indira Gandhi Delhi Technical University for Women
- Indira Gandhi Institute of Developmental Research
- Indira Gandhi Institute of Medical Sciences
- Indira Gandhi Institute of Technology (Delhi)
- Indira Gandhi Institute of Technology (Orissa)
- Indira Gandhi Medical College
- Indira Gandhi Government Medical College, Nagpur
- Indira Gandhi National Forest Academy
- Indira Gandhi National Open University
- Indira Gandhi Rashtriya Uran Akademi, Raebareli
- Indira Gandhi Institute of Physical Education and Sports Sciences (University Of Delhi)
- North Eastern Indira Gandhi Regional Institute of Health and Medical Sciences
- Gandhi Memorial International School
- Srimati Indira Gandhi State Secondary School, Quartier Militaire, Mauritius
- Indira Gandhi Cultural Center

== See also ==
- List of things named after prime ministers of India
- List of things named after Jawaharlal Nehru
- List of things named after Rajiv Gandhi
