= Indira Gandhi Stadium (Una) =

Cricket stadium in Una, Himachal Pradesh, India

Coordinates: 31°27′54.56″N 76°16′51.65″E

- Interactive map of Indira Gandhi Stadium

Ground information
- Location: Una, India
- Country: India
- Establishment: 1995 (first recorded match)

Team information
Himachal Pradesh	(1986–present)
- As of 29 October 2011; Source: Ground profile

Indira Gandhi Stadium is a cricket ground in Una, Himachal Pradesh, India. The ground first held a first-class match in November 1986 when Himachal Pradesh played the Delhi in the 1986/87 Ranji Trophy. The ground has held 21 further first-class matches, the last of which came in the 2001/02 Ranji Trophy when Himachal Pradesh and the Services. The first List A match held on the ground came in the 1989/90 Deodhar Trophy when the Central Zone played the West Zone. Himachal Pradesh first played a List A match there in 1993/94 Ranji Trophy one-day competition when the Services were the visiting team. Between the 1993/94 season and the 2010/11 season, Himachal Pradesh have played nineteen List A fixtures there.
