= Jawaharlal Nehru University Stadium =

Sports complex in New Delhi, India

- JNU Stadium
- Full name: Jawaharlal Nehru Stadium
- Former names: Jawaharlal Nehru University Sports Complex
- Location: Jawaharlal Nehru University, Delhi, India
- Owner: Jawaharlal Nehru University
- Operator: Jawaharlal Nehru University
- Capacity: 2,500 permanent seats
- Executive suites: 0
- Surface: Bermuda Princess 77 Grass – 120 m x 70 m
- Scoreboard: Rs, 12.87 crore

Construction
- Groundbreaking: 2008
- Built: 2010
- Opened: 2010

Jawaharlal Nehru University Sports Complex or Jawaharlal Nehru University Stadium is a multipurpose sports complex located in New Delhi, the capital of India. The stadium managed and owned by Jawaharlal Nehru University.

The stadium has facilities for various sports, including cricket, football, and hockey. There are also facilities for indoor sports such as basketball, badminton, gymnastics, handball, volleyball, lawn tennis, table tennis, weight lifting, and Kabbadi.

There are three main venues where the following games are played:

- Outdoor Stadium: for football, cricket, volleyball, lawn tennis, weight lifting/gymnasium, yoga, and athletics
- Badminton Hall inside the Students Activity Centre (Tefla's Building): For badminton and taekwondo (with a qualified instructor, Black Belt 4th Dan)
- Central School Grounds Basketball Court (near Tapti Hostel): Basketball
