= Rajiv Gandhi Equity Savings Scheme =

The Rajiv Gandhi Equity Savings Scheme (commonly referred to as RGESS), was a tax saving scheme announced in the 2012-2013 Union Budget of India, aimed at first time retail investors. Named after Rajiv Gandhi, the sixth Prime Minister of India, the scheme was announced by the finance minister, P. Chidambaram, on 21 September 2012. The scheme was aimed at encouraging the flow of savings of small investors in the domestic capital market, and presents investors with tax benefits provisioned as a new section, 80CCG, in the Income Tax act. The 2017 Union budget of India had stated that the scheme be phased out entirely by 2018, citing the lack of adoption.

== Objective ==
RGESS was introduced with the goal of encouraging savings from small retail investors to enter domestic capital markets. The scheme also aims at improving the retail participation in equity markets, and to promote an 'equity culture' in India. Basically its one of the best investment in tax saving in India.

== Eligibility ==
The scheme can be availed by Indian residents with an annual income not exceeding Rs: 12 lakhs. In addition, for a person to be eligible, he should not have had a Demat account prior to 23 November 2012, or should only have a Demat account that has never been used to trade. There is a lock in period of three years.

== Benefits ==
RGESS permits investments totalling up to a maximum of Rs: 50,000, of which, 50% is tax deductible. The maximum possible tax savings is Rs: 5150. In addition, the scheme is provisioned to provide the tax break over the Rs: 1.5Lakhs.

== Eligible securities ==
The securities eligible for investments under the scheme are equities listed in BSE 100 or CNX 100, shares of public sector companies categorised by the Government as Maharatna, Navratna, or Miniratna. Select ETFs and Mutual funds, and IPOs of public sector undertakings fulfilling certain criteria, are also eligible.
