= Nehru Gram Bharati =

Education institute in Prayagraj, India

Nehru Gram Bharati (Deemed to be University)
- Motto: 'Marching Ahead With Confidence'
- Type: Deemed University
- Established: July 26, 1962; 64 years ago
- Affiliations: UGC, NAAC
- Chancellor: Manish Mishra
- Vice-Chancellor: Rohit Ramesh (I/C)
- Location: Prayagraj, Uttar Pradesh, India
- Colors: White l Green l Blue
- Website: ngbv.ac.in

Nehru Gram Bharati (Deemed to be University) is a Deemed to be University in the city of Prayagraj, Uttar Pradesh state of India. The Foundation Stone of this Deemed University was laid down on 26 July 1962 by the late Jawahar Lal Nehru. All its admissions and courses are carried out in the name of Nehru Gram Bharati (Deemed to be University), Prayagraj.

== Accreditation and affiliations ==
The university is sponsored by a registered society Nehru Gram Bharati, bearing Registration number 1117/2006-2007. The University has been assessed and Accredited by the National Assessment and Accreditation Council.

== History ==
The university was established by the then Prime Minister of India; the late Jawahar Lal Nehru at his village near Jamunipur-Kotwa, which was inside his Parliamentary Constituency. Nehru addressed the gathering on the day of the conventional occasion and emphasized the need to foster the technical, vocational and professional education thus by establishing an institute. Nehru further promised his electorate to not send the children of farmers to the other big cities to pursue higher education, instead they would get the quality education and would be better trained within the rural institute at Nehru Gram Bharati (Deemed to be University) which was set up in a village at that time and also that such students after finishing their education would get better employment opportunities in their own village.

== Administration and faculty ==
Prof. Rohit Ramesh is the vice-chancellor and Shri Manish Mishra the chancellor of the university.

=== Vice chancellors ===
- Prof. Rohit Ramesh (current)
- Prof. Kaushala Prasad Mishra, 2010-2014

== Academic programs ==
The university offers the following academic programs:

=== Undergraduate programs ===
- Bachelor of Computer Applications (BCA)
- Bachelor of Business Administration (BBA)
- Bachelor of Arts (Hons./Hons. with Research)
- Bachelor of Commerce (Hons./Hons. with Research)
- Bachelor of Performing Arts (BPA)
- Bachelor of Science (Hons./Hons. with Research)
- Bachelor of Arts + Bachelor of Law (BA. LLB)
- Bachelor of Education (B.Ed.)
- Bachelor of Laws (L.L.B.)

=== Postgraduate Programs ===
- Master of Education (M.Ed.)
- Master of Arts (MA with chosen specialization)
- Master of Science (MSc. with Mathematics, Physics or Chemistry)
- Master of Business Administration (MBA)
- Master of Commerce (M.Com.)

=== Doctoral Programs ===
- Doctor of Philosophy (Ph.D.)

=== Diploma Programs ===
- Postgraduate Diploma in Computer Applications (PG. Dip. CA.)
- Postgraduate Diploma in Journalism & Mass Communication (PG. Dip. JMC.)
- Postgraduate Diploma in Retail Management (PG. Dip. Mgmt.).
