= Jawaharnagar Municipal Corporation =

Local civic body in Jawaharnagar, Telangana, India

History
- Founded: 2019
- Disbanded: November 2025
- Seats: 28 Corporators

Meeting place
- O/o Jawaharnagar Municipal Corporation, Near Ambedkar Statue, Balajinagar Main Road, Jawaharnagar, Medchal-Malkajgiri District – 500 087.

Website
- Official website

Jawaharnagar Municipal Corporation was the civic body governing Indian city of Jawaharnagar. Municipal Corporation mechanism in India was introduced during British Rule with formation of municipal corporation in Madras (Chennai) in 1688, later followed by municipal corporations in Bombay (Mumbai) and Calcutta (Kolkata) by 1762. Jawaharnagar Municipal Corporation was headed by Mayor of city and governed by Commissioner. It was merged into Greater Hyderabad Municipal Corporation in November 2025.

== History and administration ==
Jawaharnagar Municipal Corporation was formed in 2019 due to increase in population and development of infrastructure to meet the needs local public.

Donthagani Shanthi was the Mayor of Jawaharnagar Municipal Corporation.

Jyothi Reddy was the Municipal Commissioner of Jawaharnagar Municipal Corporation.

== Powers and functions ==
Jawaharnagar Municipal Corporation had the following departments for the summarised functions-

- Planning for the town including its surroundings which are covered under its Department's Urban Planning Authority.
- Approving construction of new buildings and authorising use of land for various purposes.
- Improvement of the town's economic and Social status.
- Arrangements of water supply towards commercial, residential and industrial purposes.
- Planning for fire contingencies through Fire Service Departments.
- Creation of solid waste management, public health system and sanitary services.
- Working for the development of ecological aspect like development of Urban Forestry and making guidelines for environmental protection.
- Working for the development of weaker sections of the society like mentally and physically handicapped, old age and gender biased people.
- Making efforts for improvement of slums and poverty removal in the town.

== Revenue sources ==
The following were the Income sources for the Corporation from the Central and State Government.

=== Revenue from taxes ===
Following was the Tax related revenue for the corporation.

- Property tax.
- Profession tax.
- Entertainment tax.
- Grants from Central and State Government like Goods and Services Tax.
- Advertisement tax.

=== Revenue from non-tax sources ===
Following is the Non Tax related revenue for the corporation.

- Water usage charges.
- Fees from Documentation services.
- Rent received from municipal property.
- Funds from municipal bonds.

== See also ==
- List of municipal corporations in India
