= Jawaharlal Nehru Biological Park =

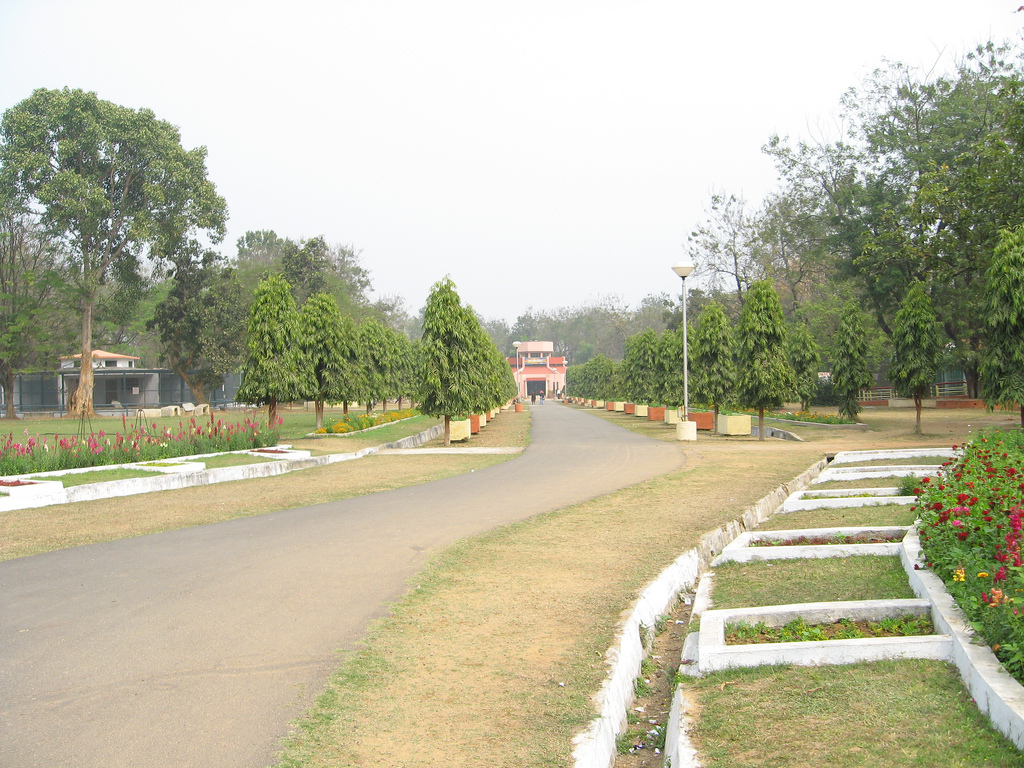
- Date opened: 1989
- Location: Bokaro Steel City, Jharkhand, India

Jawaharlal Nehru Biological Park or JNB is a zoological garden located in Bokaro Steel City, Jharkhand, India, fully owned and managed by Bokaro Steel Plant, Steel Authority of India Limited. This is the largest zoological garden of the state.

== History ==
Jawaharlal Nehru Biological Park was constructed during the 1980s and modified in 1989. It is named after Pandit Jawaharlal Nehru who served as the first prime minister of India

== Attractions ==
The zoo has varieties of animals and birds which have been brought from different parts of world. The zoo's attempts to breed white tigers, royal Bengal tigers and Asiatic lions have been successful. There is also facility to boat in an artificial lake.
