= Jawaharnagar (Gujarat Refinery) =

- town
- Interactive map of Jawaharnagar (Gujarat Refinery)
- Coordinates: 22.370254°N 73.120197°E
- Country: India
- State: Gujarat
- District: Vadodara

Population (2001)
  - Total: 4,666

Languages
  - Official: Gujarati, Hindi
- Time zone: UTC+5:30 (IST)
- Postal code: 391320 <ref="Indian Post Office">http://utilities.cept.gov.in/pinsearch/pinsearch.aspx </ref>
- Vehicle registration: GJ
- Website: gujaratindia.com

Jawaharnagar is a town and an industrial notified area in Vadodara district in the Indian state of Gujarat.

== Demographics ==
As of 2001 India census, Jawaharnagar had a population of 4666. Males constitute 51% of the population and females 49%. Jawaharnagar has an average literacy rate of 79%, higher than the national average of 59.5%: male literacy is 83%, and female literacy is 75%. In Jawaharnagar 14% of the population is under 6 years of age.
