= Nehru Stadium, Tumkur =

Multi-purpose stadium in Tumkur, Karnataka, India

Nehru Stadium
- Location: Tumkur, Karnataka
- Capacity: 20,000

Construction
- Opened: 1973

Website
- ESPNcricinfo

Nehru Stadium is a multi-purpose stadium in Tumkur, Karnataka. The ground is mainly used for organizing matches of football and field hockey and also athletics. The stadium hosted one first-class match in 1973 when Karnataka cricket team played against Vidarbha cricket team. but since then the stadium has not hosted any cricket matches.
