= Jawahar Navodaya Vidyalaya, Canacona =

- Swami Vivekananda, posing through the green campus of JNV Canacona

Location
- Goa, District: South Goa, Taluka:Canacona; 14°59′52″N 74°03′02″E

Information
- Type: Public
- Motto: Pragyanam Brahma
- Established: 1986
- Principal: Animesh Pal
- Grades: VI – XII
- Enrollment: 400 approx, as per 2015–2016 study-year
- Campus type: Rural
- Sports: Cricket, basketball, volleyball, football, badminton, kabbadi, etc.
- USNWR ranking: 2nd in Pune Region
- Affiliation: CBSE
- Information: Upholding talented children from the district of South Goa is the aim of this insttuition
- Website: navodaya.gov.in/nvs/nvs-school/SOUTHGOA/hi/home/

Jawahar Navodaya Vidyalaya, Canacona is a part of Navodaya Vidyalaya Family in India. It is located in Cancona in South Goa district of Goa state.

Students are admitted to this Vidyalaya in Class VI. However, lateral entry admissions to Class IX, also is considered for the vacant seats. Overall, rural area people have a more weight-age in comparison to urban, as per the rules and norms of Navodaya Vidyalaya Samiti, India.

== About ==
Jawahar Navodaya Vidyalayas (JNVs) are a system of alternate schools for gifted students in India. They are run by Navodaya Vidyalaya Samiti, New Delhi, an autonomous organization under the Ministry of Human Resource Development, Department of Education, Government of India. JNVs are fully residential and co-educational schools with classes from VI to XII standard. JNVs are specifically tasked with finding talented children in rural areas of India and providing them with an education equivalent to the best residential school system, without regard to their family's socio-economic condition.

== Affiliations ==
JNV Canacona is affiliated with Central Board of Secondary Education [C.B.S.E.], New Delhi and follows syllabus prescribed by CBSE. This schools CBSE affiliation number is 2840001.

== See also ==
- Navodaya Vidyalaya Samiti
- Jawahar Navodaya Vidyalaya
