= Nehru Park, Thrissur =

Park in Thrissur, India

- Children’s Park, Thrissur
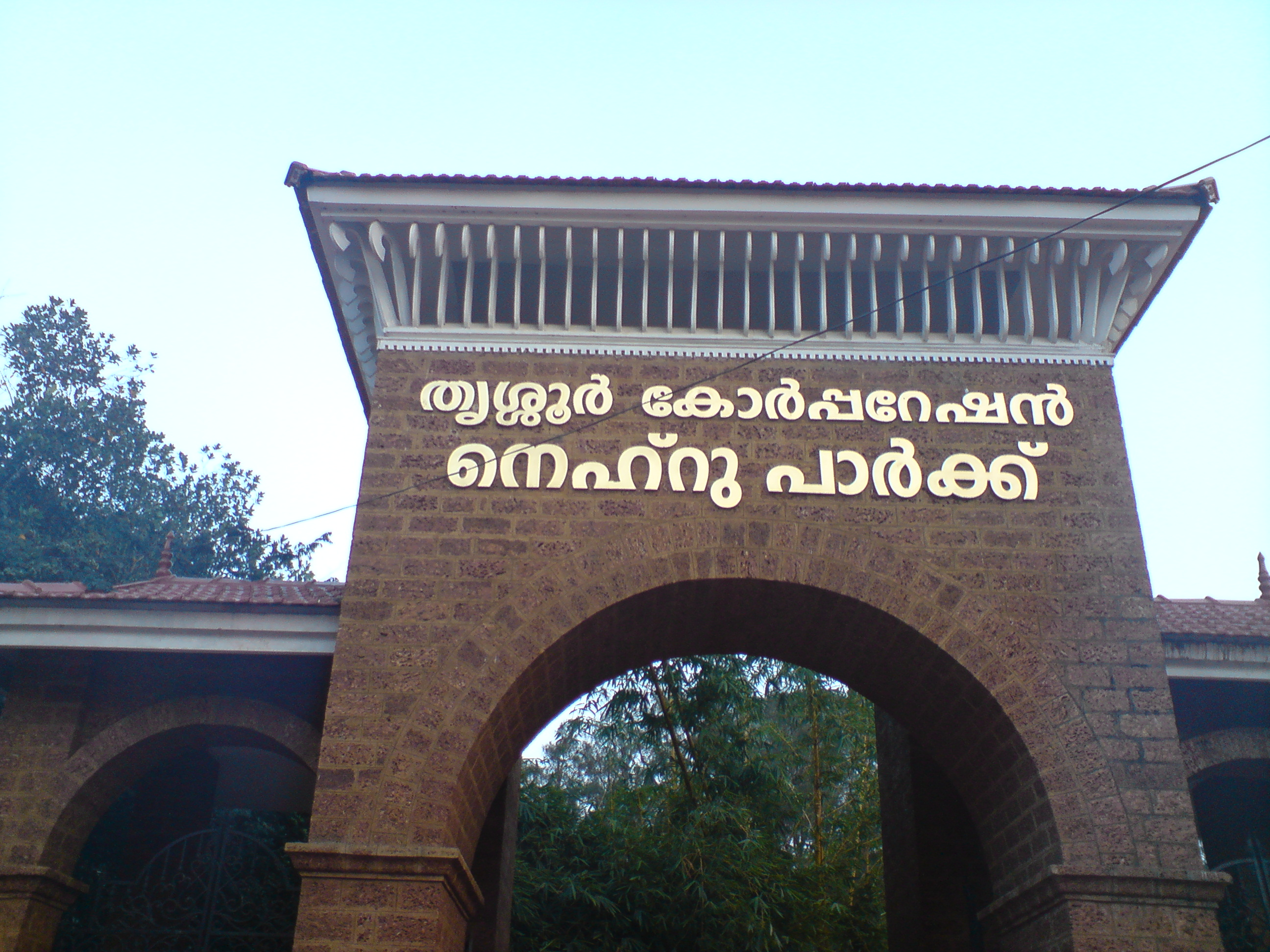
- Entrance of Nehru Park
- Interactive map of Nehru Park, Thrissur
- Type: Public park
- Location: Thrissur City, India
- Area: 8.5 acres
- Created: 1959
- Operator: Thrissur Municipal Corporation
- Status: Open all year

Nehru Park, Thrissur, is a children’s park named after first Prime Minister of India Jawaharlal Nehru and is owned by Thrissur Municipal Corporation in Thrissur City of Kerala, India.

== History ==
The park was inaugurated by the first Vice President of India Sarvepalli Radhakrishnan in 1959.
