= Nehru Stadium, Hubli =

Multi purpose stadium in Hubli, Karnataka, India

Coordinates: 15°21′1″N 75°8′34″E

Nehru Stadium
- Interactive map of Nehru Stadium
- Full name: Jawaharlal Nehru Stadium
- Former names: Jawaharlal Nehru Stadium
- Location: Hubballi, Karnataka, India
- Owner: Sports Authority Of Karnataka
- Operator: Sports Authority Of Karnataka
- Capacity: 15,000

Construction
- Groundbreaking: 1958
- Opened: 1958

Website
- ESPNcricinfo

Jawaharlal Nehru Stadium is a multi purpose stadium in Hubli, Karnataka. The ground is mainly used for organizing matches of football, cricket and other sports. The stadium has hosted three Ranji Trophy match in 1972 when Mysore cricket team played against Kerala cricket team. The ground has two more Ranji Trophy matches in 1976 and against in 1992, but since then the stadium has hosted non-first-class matches.
