= Nehru Stadium, Shimoga =

Stadium in Karnataka, India

Nehru Stadium
- Full name: Northern Railway Stadium
- Former names: Jawaharlal Nehru Stadium
- Location: Shimoga, Karnataka
- Capacity: 5,000

Construction
- Groundbreaking: 1973
- Opened: 1974

Website
- ESPNcricinfo

Nehru Stadium is a multi purpose stadium in Shimoga, Karnataka. The ground is mainly used for organizing matches of football, cricket and other sports. The stadium has hosted a first-class match twice: in 1973 when Karnataka cricket team played against Andhra cricket team and again in 1979 when Karnataka cricket team played against Kerala cricket team, but since then the stadium has not hosted any cricket matches.
