= Jawahar Navodaya Vidyalaya =

Co-educational, residential schools in India

- All over India except Tamil Nadu

Information
- Other name: JNV, Navodaya
- Type: Public
- Motto: प्रज्ञानं ब्रह्म (Sanskrit); Prajñānam Brahma (ISO) transl. "Pure Knowledge is Brahma"
- Established: 1986; 40 years ago
- Founder: Rajiv Gandhi
- School board: CBSE
- Authority: Union of India, Department of School Education and Literacy
- Chairman: Dharmendra Pradhan
- Commissioner: Vikas Gupta, IAS
- Grades: VI–XII
- Age range: 11–19 yrs
- Enrollment: 3,10,517 (30 September 2025)
- Campus size: 5–30 acres each school
- Campus type: Residential
- Houses: Aravali; Nilgiri; Shivalik; Udaygiri
- Budget: ▲₹4,115 crore (US$430 million) (FY2022–23 est.)
- Website: navodaya.gov.in

Jawahar Navodaya Vidyalaya ((JNV)) is a system of central schools for students predominantly from rural areas in India, targeting socially and economically backward, gifted students who lack access to accelerated learning due to financial, social and rural disadvantages.

They are run by the Navodaya Vidyalaya Samiti, Noida, an autonomous organisation under the Department of School Education and Literacy, Ministry of Education. JNVs are fully residential and co-educational schools affiliated to Central Board of Secondary Education (CBSE), with classes from VI to XII standard.

Budget for all the activities at JNVs is provided by the Department of School Education and Literacy, and it is free of cost for students during the first 3 years of stay, from class IX onwards a nominal fee of ₹1,125 per month is applicable for general and OBC caste students with APL card, yearly ₹18,000/-. (Note: However some students are also exempted from this fees like girl students, students belonging to SC/ST category and students which are belonging to Below Poverty Line families)

JNVs exist all over India, with the exception of Tamil Nadu. As of 31 December 2022, 661 JNVs were running with about 2,87,568 students enrolled, out of which 2,51,430 (≈87%) were from rural areas. In 2022, JNVs were the top-ranked C.B.S.E. schools, having a pass percentage of 99.71% and 98.93% in 10th and 12th grades respectively. Selected Jawahar Navodaya Vidyalayas (JNVs) have added PM SHRI (Pradhan Mantri Schools for Rising India) to their official names. This change happens when a specific JNV is chosen to be upgraded and funded under the central government's PM SHRI Scheme. Not all JNVs are renamed, only the ones chosen in the upgrade phases.

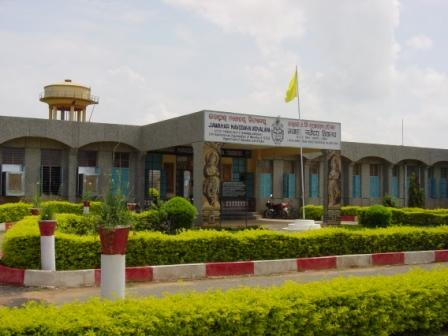
Jawahar Navodaya Vidyalaya, Nuapada, Odisha

== History ==
In 1986, Rajiv Gandhi, then Prime Minister of India, announced a National Policy on Education to modernise and expand higher education programmes across India. In 1986, he founded the Jawahar Navodaya Vidyalaya System, a Central government-based education institution providing rural populations with free residential education from grades six to twelve. Then Union Minister of Human Resource Development, P.V. Narasimha Rao played an instrumental role in establishing these Institutions all over India.

As per the Policy of the Government, one JNV was to be established in each district of the country. To start with, two Jawahar Navodaya Vidyalayas were established during 1985–86, at Jhajjar (Haryana) and Amravati (Maharashtra). As of the 2022-23 academic session, JNVs had been sanctioned for 638 districts. In addition, ten JNVs have been sanctioned in districts having a large population of ST population, ten in districts having a large concentration of SC population and 3 special JNVs in Manipur and Ratlam, bringing the total number of sanctioned JNVs to 661. Out of these 649 JNVs are functional.

== Organisational structure ==
Navodaya Vidyalayas are run by the Navodaya Vidyalaya Samiti (NVS) an autonomous organisation under the Ministry of Education (MoE) (formerly the Ministry of Human Resource Development (MHRD) (1985–2020)), Department of School Education and Literacy, Govt. of India. The Chairman of the Samiti is the Minister of Education.

The Samiti functions through the executive committee under the Chairmanship of the Minister of Education. The executive committee is responsible for the management of all affairs including allocation of funds to the Samiti and has the authority to exercise all powers of Samiti. It is assisted by two sub-committees, the Finance Committee and Academic Advisory Committee. The executive head of the administrative pyramid is the Commissioner who executes the policies laid down by the Samiti's executive committee. He/she is assisted at the Headquarters level by Joint Commissioners, Deputy Commissioners and Assistant Commissioners. The Samiti has established eight regional offices for the administration and monitoring of Navodaya Vidyalayas under their jurisdiction. These offices are headed by a deputy commissioner and assistant commissioners.

For each JNV, there is a Vidyalaya Advisory Committee for assistance on matters of academics, infrastructure and other general activities and a Vidyalaya Management Committee for budget preparation, selection of ad-hoc teachers and proper functioning of the school. Normally the district collector of the concerned district is the ex-officio chairman of school level committees with local educationists, public representatives and officers from the district as members. Some schools also have a Vidhyalaya Coordination Committee for looking after the performance of academics.

Navodaya Vidyalaya Samiti (NVS) implemented PM SHRI Scheme across 317 selected schools in 2023-24 and, renamed these beneficiary schools as PM SHRI School Jawahar Navodaya Vidyalaya.

== List of schools ==
List of JNV schools
Regions (no. of JNVs)	States/UTs (respective no. of JNVs)
Bhopal (113)	Chhattisgarh (28), Madhya Pradesh (54), Odisha (31)
Chandigarh (59)	Chandigarh(1), Himachal Pradesh (12), J&K (21), Ladakh (2), Punjab (23)
Hyderabad (77)	A & N Islands (3), Andhra Pradesh(15), Karnataka (31), Kerala (14), Lakshadweep (1), Puducherry (4), Telangana (9)
Jaipur (65)	Delhi (9), Haryana (21), Rajasthan (35)
Lucknow (89)	Uttarakhand (13), Uttar Pradesh (76)
Patna (85)	Bihar (39), Jharkhand (26), West Bengal (20)
Pune (73)	Dadra and Nagar Haveli and Daman and Diu (1+2), Goa (2), Gujarat (34), Maharashtra (34)
Shillong (100)	Arunachal Pradesh (18), Assam (28), Manipur (11), Meghalaya (12), Mizoram (8), Nagaland (11), Sikkim (4), Tripura (8)

JNVs operate in every Indian state and Union Territory, with the sole exception of Tamil Nadu.

Total 661 functional residential schools have been sanctioned in 638 districts of India with some special case institutes. 653 JNVs are functional. These are administered by eight regional offices (see table below) with jurisdiction over different states and UTs.

== Admission ==
Admission to Class VI of the JNVs requires qualification in the Jawahar Navodaya Vidyalaya Selection Test (JNVST), an entrance exam designed, developed and conducted by the CBSE. JNVST for Class VI is conducted annually throughout the country to select the 80 most meritorious students for each JNV. It is conducted in three phases per year, depending upon the session structure in the specific state or union territory. Candidates can apply for the test only once during their Class V. Competition in the entrance exam can be gauged from the fact that in JNVST 2021, a total of 24,17,009 students appeared and 47,320 students were selected (i.e. approx 1.95% pass percentage) The test encompasses mental ability skills, mathematics, and regional language. The schools provide reservations as per NVS policy which encompasses reservation for ST, SC and OBCs, at least 75% selection of students from rural areas, maximum 25% from urban areas, fixed 33% for female students and 3% for disabled candidates.

To compensate for attrition and optimally utilize seats, JNVST, developed by CBSE, is also conducted for admission to Class IX and lateral admissions, based on lateral test for filling the vacant seats as most of the seats in class 11th are given to students passing 10th from the school and should meet the defined criteria.

== Academics at JNVs ==
JNVs have classes from VI to XII standard. A particular JNV usually provides two streams among Science, Arts and Commerce for Class XI and XII. JNVs are known for their academic excellence, which can be attributed to their merit-based entrance test and unique climate provided for otherwise disadvantaged children, and which is further proven by their performance at board examinations. More than half of JNVs have been equipped with smart classes. These schools regularly organize science congresses and exhibitions to promote a research mindset.

=== Three-language formula ===
To facilitate migration every JNV student learns three languages in class VI to Class IX. These languages are grouped into A Level, B-I Level and B-II Level. The pattern followed in different categories of states is as shown in the table below. However, CBSE mandates for children to study two languages only. Therefore, students of each category of states appear for A Level and B-I level languages at CBSE examinations.

Three-language formula at JNVs
Category of state	A Level language	B-I Level language	B-II Level language
Hindi Speaking	Hindi	English	Regional language
Non-Hindi Speaking (excluding North Eastern states)	Regional language	English	Hindi
North-East States	English	Hindi	Regional language

=== Board results ===
JNVs has consistently produced the best results in CBSE board examinations over the years. In 2015–16 results, JNVs had a pass percentage of, 98.87% in Class X board exams and 96.73% in Class XII board exams. The pass percentage for JNVs has been higher than independent private schools, government schools and even Kendriya Vidyalayas. Quality of performance in the Board examinations has been exemplary with an average score of about 75% in Grade 12th and 78% in class 10th, with more than 89% of students scoring First Division scores, in the Board Examinations 2019.

=== Smart classes ===
Navodaya Vidyalayas in collaboration with Samsung India set up smart classes in 450 JNVs and 7 Navodaya Leadership Institutes from 2013 to 2019. A smart class is typically equipped with an interactive Smartboard, laptops/tablets, Wi-Fi connectivity and power backup. A smart class supplements regular lessons in mathematics, science social science, English, and Hindi to explain concepts in an engaging and interactive manner. Teachers are trained to use the equipment effectively.

== Social and cultural life ==
The social milieu of JNVs is defined by the mingling of different sections of society from various regions of India since these schools follow the affirmative action policy and have a policy for migration from different linguistic regions. Teachers, chosen from across the country, live on the same campus and interact with students on a 24X7 basis leading to a familial feeling.

=== Promotion of national integration through migration ===
One of the important features of the JNV scheme is the Migration Programme wherein two linked JNVs of different linguistic categories exchange students between them. The aim of the exchange program is to "promote national integration and enrich social content". According to the scheme, a selected 30% of Class IX students are exchanged between two linked JNVs of different linguistic categories (generally between Hindi-speaking and non-Hindi-speaking states) for one year. During the migration period the three languages being taught to migrated students remain the same as in their parent JNV, but social and cultural exchanges are facilitated by their language learning in Class VI to IX. Initially migration was envisaged for students from Class IX to Class XII; it was reduced to two years (Class IX and Class X) in 1991–92. Finally in 1996-97 it was confined to only Class IX students.

== Emulation of the Navodaya Vidyalaya system ==
Emulating the concept of residential schools for talented children, Odisha State plans to set up one Odisha Adarsha Vidyalaya (OAV) (transl. Odisha Model School (OMS)) at each of 314 block headquarters. 160 schools have already been launched. These Adarsha Vidyalayas would be CBSE-affiliated fully residential schools, provide free education, and target talented students through an annual entrance examination. These would have Class VI through Class XII and each class would have 80 students. These schools would be administered through Odisha Adarsha Vidyalaya Sangathan (transl. Odisha Model Schools Organisation (OMSO)), a society registered under the Society Registration Act of Odisha.

== Concerns over student welfare ==
Incidents of suicide among students and the lack of apparatus to engage with such issues concerning health and discrimination plague the schools. This has affected the Dalit and Tribal students more and there is no method in place to avoid such incidents. There is no system in place to report the cases of inadequate care and abuse by staff, much of attention from the school administration in the form of mundane bureaucratic procedures comes after the occurrence of violation.

== Expansion of the JNV network (2024–2029) ==
In December 2024 the Cabinet Committee on Economic Affairs (CCEA) approved the establishment of 28 new Navodaya Vidyalayas in districts previously uncovered by the scheme. This budget for this expansion is an estimated total outlay of ₹2,359.82 crore spread over five years, from 2024–25 to 2028–29. The new schools are strategically located in underserved areas, including multiple districts in states like Arunachal Pradesh, Assam, and Telangana.

== Alumni ==
Alumni include:

- Surendra Poonia, international award-winning sportsman and Limca book record holder
- Hima Das, international athlete and gold medalist in Asian Games
- Abhilash Shetty, Kannada film director and actor
- C.K. Vineeth, India national football team member and Kerala Blasters player
- V.T. Balram, MLA of Thrithala Constituency, Kerala 2011–2021
- Dhananjay Kannoujia, current MLA of Belthara Road Constituency, Uttar Pradesh since March 2017
- Dheeraj Singh Moirangthem, Indian Under-17 football team member and FC Goa player
- Ummer Fayaz Parray, Indian Army officer who was abducted and killed in Kashmir
- Lalit Prabhakar, Marathi actor
- Ravi Bhatia, Indian television actor
- Basharat Peer, Kashmiri American journalist
- Goddeti Madavi, MP of Araku Constituency, AP
- Sasikanth Manipatruni, scientist and inventor in the areas of electronics and computer engineering.
- Hemang Joshi, an Indian politician and a member of the Lok Sabha from the Vadodara Lok Sabha constituency.
- Hemant Kher, actor, writer, and acting coach, best known for his role as Ashwin Mehta in the web series Scam 1992: The Harshad Mehta Story.
- Hemang Joshi, member of the Lok Sabha from the Vadodara Lok Sabha constituency
