= List of cricket grounds by capacity =

The following is a list of cricket grounds, ordered by capacity, as of July 2024. Cricket venues with a capacity of at least 1,000 are included.

== Active stadiums ==
=== Capacity over 100,000 ===
Ground	Capacity	City	Country	Home teams	Image
Narendra Modi Stadium	132,000	Ahmedabad	India	India, Gujarat, Gujarat Titans	
Melbourne Cricket Ground	100,024	Melbourne	Australia	Australia, Victoria cricket team, Melbourne Stars	

=== Capacity of 50,000 to 99,999 ===
Ground	Capacity	City	Country	Home teams	Image
Eden Gardens	68,000	Kolkata	India	India, Bengal, Kolkata Knight Riders	
Shaheed Veer Narayan Singh International Cricket Stadium	65,000	Naya Raipur	India	India, Chhattisgarh, Delhi Capitals	
Perth Stadium	61,266	Perth	Australia	Australia, Western Warriors, Perth Scorchers	
Adelaide Oval	53,500	Adelaide	Australia	Australia, Southern Redbacks, Adelaide Strikers	
Singapore National Stadium	52,000	Kallang	Singapore	Singapore national cricket team	
The Sports Hub Trivandrum	50,000	Thiruvananthapuram	India	India, Kerala cricket team	
Bharat Ratna Shri Atal Bihari Vajpayee Ekana Cricket Stadium	50,000	Lucknow	India	India, Uttar Pradesh, Lucknow Super Giants	
JSCA International Cricket Stadium	50,000	Ranchi	India	India, Jharkhand, Kolkata Knight Riders	
Brabourne Stadium	50,000	Mumbai	India	Bombay Quadrangular, Rajasthan Royals	
Shrimant Madhavrao Scindia Cricket Stadium	50,000	Gwalior West	India	Indian cricket team, Madhya Pradesh cricket team	
Rajgir International Cricket Stadium	50,000	Rajgir	India	Bihar cricket team	

=== Capacity of 40,000 to 49,999 ===
Ground	Capacity	City	Country	Home teams	Image
Docklands Stadium	48,003	Melbourne	Australia	Melbourne Renegades	
Sydney Cricket Ground	48,000	Sydney	Australia	Australia, New South Wales cricket team, Sydney Sixers	
Assam Cricket Association Stadium	46,000	Guwahati	India	India, Assam	
DY Patil Stadium	45,300	Navi Mumbai	India	India, Mumbai Cricket Team, Mumbai Indians	
Vidarbha Cricket Association Stadium	45,000	Nagpur	India	India, Vidarbha	
Barabati Stadium	45,000	Cuttack	India	India, Odisha	
Saifai International Cricket Stadium	43,000	Saifai	India	India, Uttar Pradesh Cricket Association	
Maharashtra Cricket Association Stadium	42,700	Pune	India	India, Maharashtra, Pune Warriors, Chennai Super Kings	
Eden Park	42,000	Auckland	New Zealand	New Zealand, Auckland Aces	
The Gabba	42,000	Brisbane	Australia	Australia, Queensland Bulls, Brisbane Heat	
Maharaja Yadavindra Singh International Cricket Stadium	40,000	New Chandigarh	India	India, Punjab	
Baroda Cricket Association Stadium	40,000	Vadodara	India	India, Gujarat cricket team	
M. Chinnaswamy Stadium	40,000	Bengaluru	India	India, Karnataka, Royal Challengers Bengaluru	
Barkatullah Khan Stadium	40,000	Jodhpur	India	India, Rajasthan Cricket Team, Rajasthan Royals	
Kardinia Park	40,000	Geelong	Australia	Australia, Victoria Bushrangers, Melbourne Renegades	

=== Capacity of 30,000 to 39,999 ===
Ground	Capacity	City	Country	Home teams	Image
Rajiv Gandhi International Cricket Stadium	39,200	Hyderabad	India	India, Hyderabad, Sunrisers Hyderabad, Deccan Chargers	
M.A. Chidambaram Stadium	38,200	Chennai	India	India, Tamil Nadu cricket team, Chennai Super Kings, Chepauk Super Gillies	
Maharaja Yadavindra Singh International Cricket Stadium	38,000	New Chandigarh	India	India, Punjab, Punjab Kings	
Arun Jaitley Stadium	35,200	New Delhi	India	India, Delhi, Delhi Capitals	
Udaipur International Cricket Stadium	35,000	Udaipur	India	Rajasthan cricket team	
Multan Cricket Stadium	35,000	Multan	Pakistan	Pakistan, Multan Sultans	
Galle International Stadium	35,000	Galle	Sri Lanka	Sri Lanka, Galle Cricket Club	
Mahinda Rajapaksa International Cricket Stadium	35,000	Hambantota	Sri Lanka	Sri Lanka	
R. Premadasa Stadium	35,000	Colombo	Sri Lanka	Sri Lanka, Colombo Strikers	
Pallekele International Cricket Stadium	35,000	Pallekele, Kandy	Sri Lanka	Sri Lanka, Kandy Falcons	
Sky Stadium	35,000	Wellington	New Zealand	Wellington Firebirds	
Imran Khan Cricket Stadium	25,000	Peshawar	Pakistan	Peshawar Panthers, Peshawar Zalmi	
Gaddafi Stadium	34,000+	Lahore	Pakistan	Pakistan, Lahore Lions, Lahore Eagles, Lahore Qalandars	
Wanderers Stadium	34,000	Johannesburg	South Africa	South Africa, Central Gauteng Lions, Transvaal	
Wankhede Stadium	33,108	Mumbai	India	India, Mumbai Cricket Team, Mumbai Indians	
Green Park Stadium	32,000	Kanpur	India	Indian cricket team, Gujarat Lions, Uttar Pradesh cricket team	
Lord's	31,100	London	England	Marylebone Cricket Club, England, Middlesex	
Ispat Stadium	30,000	Rourkela	India	Odisha cricket team	
Chandigarh Cricket Stadium	30,000	Chandigarh	India	India, Punjab, Haryana	
Holkar Cricket Stadium	30,000	Indore	India	Madhya Pradesh, Punjab Kings	
National Stadium	30,000	Karachi	Pakistan	Pakistan, Karachi cricket teams, Karachi Kings, Quetta Gladiators, Peshawar Zalmi	

=== Capacity of 20,000 to 29,999 ===
Ground	Capacity	City	Country	Home teams	Image
PCA-IS Bindra Stadium	28,000	Mohali	India	India, Punjab, Punjab Kings	
Niranjan Shah Stadium	28,000	Rajkot	India	India, Saurashtra, Gujarat, Gujarat Lions	
The Oval	27,500	London	England	England, Surrey	
Dr. YS Rajasekhara Reddy ACA–VDCA Cricket Stadium	27,500	Visakhapatnam	India	India, Andhra Pradesh, Mumbai Indians	
Old Trafford	26,000	Manchester	England	England, Lancashire	
Sher-e-Bangla Cricket Stadium	25,416	Dhaka	Bangladesh	Bangladesh, Dhaka Capitals	
Central Broward Park	25,000	Lauderhill	United States	United States, West Indies	
Salem Cricket Foundation Stadium	25,000	Salem	India	India, Tamil Nadu, Salem Spartans	
K.D. Singh Babu Stadium	25,000	Lucknow	India	Uttar Pradesh	
Queen's Park Oval	25,000	Port of Spain	Trinidad and Tobago	Trinidad and Tobago	
Dubai International Cricket Stadium	25,000	Dubai	United Arab Emirates	Pakistan, Afghanistan, UAE	
Dehradun International Cricket Stadium	25,000	Dehradun	India	India, Uttarakhand, Afghanistan	
Greenfield Stadium	25,000	Trelawny Parish	Jamaica	West Indies, Jamaica	
Carrara Stadium	25,000	Gold Coast	Australia	Australia, Brisbane Heat	
Khan Shaheb Osman Ali Stadium	25,000	Fatullah	Bangladesh	Bangladesh, Dhaka Capitals	
Kingsmead Cricket Ground	25,000	Durban	South Africa	South Africa, Dolphins	
Newlands Cricket Ground	25,000	Cape Town	South Africa	South Africa, Cape Cobras	
Rose Bowl	25,000	Southampton	England	England, Hampshire	
Edgbaston Cricket Ground	24,803	Birmingham	England	England, Warwickshire	
Sydney Showground Stadium	24,000	Sydney	Australia	Sydney Thunder	
Sawai Mansingh Stadium	23,185	Jaipur	India	India, Rajasthan, Rajasthan Royals	
HPCA Stadium	23,000	Dharamsala	India	India, Himachal Pradesh, Punjab Kings	
Zohur Ahmed Chowdhury Stadium	22,000	Chittagong	Bangladesh	Bangladesh, Chittagong Vikings, Chittagong Division	
Centurion Park	21,000	Centurion	South Africa	South Africa, Titans	
WACA Ground	20,000	Perth	Australia	Australia, Western Warriors, Perth Scorchers	
North Sydney Oval	20,000	Sydney	Australia	New South Wales Blues	
Tribhuvan University International Cricket Ground	20,000	Kirtipur	Nepal	Nepal	
Queen's Park	20,000	Saint George's	Grenada	West Indies	
Jinnah Stadium	20,000	Gujranwala	Pakistan	Pakistan	
Mangaung Oval	20,000	Bloemfontein	South Africa	South Africa, Knights	
Veer Surendra Sai Stadium	20,000	Sambalpur	India	Odisha cricket team	
Willowmoore Park	20,000	Benoni	South Africa	South Africa, Titans	
Sabina Park	20,000	Kingston	Jamaica	West Indies, Jamaica	
Sheikh Zayed Cricket Stadium	20,000	Abu Dhabi	United Arab Emirates	Pakistan	
Bellerive Oval	20,000	Bellerive	Australia	Australia, Tasmanian Tigers, Hobart Hurricanes	

=== Capacity of 10,000 to 19,999 ===
Ground	Capacity	City	Country	Home teams	Image
McLean Park	19,700	Napier	New Zealand	Central Stags	
Queenstown Events Centre	19,000	Queenstown	New Zealand	New Zealand	
St George's Park Cricket Ground	19,000	Port Elizabeth	South Africa	South Africa, Warriors	
York Park	19,000	Launceston	Australia	Hobart Hurricanes women, Hobart Hurricanes	
Sylhet International Cricket Stadium	18,500	Sylhet	Bangladesh	Bangladesh, Sylhet Strikers, Sylhet Division	
Headingley	18,350	Leeds	England	England, Yorkshire CCC	
Arnos Vale Stadium	18,000	Kingstown	Saint Vincent and the Grenadines	West Indies	
Captain Roop Singh Stadium	18,000	Gwalior	India	Madhya Pradesh	
Iqbal Stadium	18,000	Faisalabad	Pakistan	Faisalabad Wolves	
Jinnah Stadium	18,000	Sialkot	Pakistan	Sialkot Stallions	
Senwes Park	18,000	Potchefstroom	South Africa	South Africa	
Hagley Oval	18,000	Christchurch	New Zealand	Canterbury	
Rangpur Riders Cricket Arena	18,000	Bashundhara R/A	Bangladesh	Rangpur Riders	
Riverside Ground	17,000	Chester-le-Street	England	England, Durham	
Trent Bridge	17,000	Nottingham	England	England, Nottinghamshire	
Rangiri Dambulla International Stadium	16,800	Dambulla	Sri Lanka	Sri Lanka, Dambulla Thunders	
Sharjah Cricket Stadium	16,000	Sharjah	United Arab Emirates	Pakistan, United Arab Emirates	
Quaid-e-Azam Stadium	16,000	Mirpur	Pakistan	AJK Jaguars	
Sheikh Abu Naser Stadium	15,600	Khulna	Bangladesh	Bangladesh, Khulna Division, Khulna Titans	
Buffalo Park	15,000	East-London	South Africa	South Africa, Warriors	
Pokhara International Cricket Stadium	5,000	Pokhara	Nepal	Nepal Women	
County Cricket Ground	15,000	Bristol	England	Gloucestershire	
Grand Prairie Stadium	15,000	Grand Prairie, TX	United States	United States	
Sophia Gardens	15,000	Cardiff	Wales	England, Glamorgan	
St Lawrence Ground	15,000	Canterbury	England	Kent	
Owen Delany Park	15,000	Taupō	New Zealand	Northern Districts Knights	
Providence Stadium	15,000	Providence	Guyana	2007 Cricket World Cup	
Madhavrao Scindia Cricket Ground	15,000	Rajkot	India	Saurashtra Cricket Association	
Brian Lara Stadium	15,000	Gasparillo	Trinidad and Tobago	West Indies	
Niaz Stadium	15,000	Hyderabad	Pakistan	Hyderabad Hawks	
Rawalpindi Cricket Stadium	15,000	Rawalpindi	Pakistan	Rawalpindi Rams, Islamabad United, Peshawar Zalmi	
P. Sara Oval	15,000	Colombo	Sri Lanka	Sri Lanka	
Shaheed Chandu Stadium	15,000	Bogra	Bangladesh	Bangladesh, Rangpur Riders	
West End Park International Cricket Stadium	14,500	Doha	Qatar	Qatar	
Devonport Oval	14,000	Devonport	Australia	Devonport Cricket Club	
Kandahar International Cricket Stadium	14,000	Kandahar	Afghanistan	Afghanistan	
Darren Sammy Cricket Ground	13,700	Gros Islet	Saint Lucia	Windward Islands	
Cazaly Stadium	13,500	Cairns	Australia	Australia	
Marrara Oval	12,500	Darwin	Australia	Australia	
County Ground	12,500	Taunton	England	Somerset County Cricket Club	
Windsor Park	12,000	Roseau	Dominica	West Indies, Windward Islands cricket team	
Manuka Oval	12,000	Canberra	Australia	Australia, Sydney Thunder	
Guanggong International Cricket Stadium	12,000	Guangzhou	China	China	
Malahide Cricket Club Ground	11,500	Dublin	Ireland	Ireland, Leinster Lightning	
North Marine Road Ground	11,500	Scarborough	England	Yorkshire CCC, Scarborough CC	
Kensington Oval	11,000	Bridgetown	Barbados	West Indies, Barbados Royals	
De Beers Diamond Oval	11,000	Kimberley	South Africa	Northern Cape, Griqualand West	
Sir Vivian Richards Stadium	10,000	Antigua	Antigua and Barbuda	West Indies	
Harare Sports Club	10,000	Harare	Zimbabwe	Zimbabwe, Matabeleland Tuskers	
Riverway Stadium	10,000	Townsville	Australia	Queensland Bulls	
Coffs Harbour International Stadium	10,000	Coffs Harbour	Australia	New South Wales Blues	
Great Barrier Reef Arena	10,000	Mackay	Australia	Queensland Bulls	
Muzaffarabad Cricket Stadium	10,000	Muzaffarabad	Pakistan	Pakistan	
Boland Park	10,000	Paarl	South Africa	South Africa	
Prairie View Cricket Complex	10,000	Houston	United States	United States, Houston Hurricanes	
Georgetown Cricket Club Ground	10,000	Georgetown	Guyana	West Indies	
North Tasmania Cricket Association Ground	10,000	Launceston	Australia	Launceston	
Newcastle Number 1 Sports Ground	10,000	Newcastle	Australia	Australia	

=== Capacity of under 10,000 ===
Ground	Capacity	City	Country	Home teams
County Cricket Ground	9,500	Derby	England	Derbyshire County Cricket Club
Queens Sports Club	9,000	Bulawayo	Zimbabwe	Zimbabwe, Matabeleland Tuskers
Bermuda National Stadium	8,500	Hamilton	Bermuda	Bermuda
Bankstown Oval	8,000	Sydney	Australia	Australia women
TCA Ground	8,000	Hobart	Australia	North Hobart Cricket Club
Namibia Cricket Ground	7,500	Windhoek	Namibia	Namibia
Traeger Park	7,200	Alice Springs	Australia	Hobart Hurricanes
Junction Oval	7,000	St Kilda, Victoria	Australia	Victoria cricket team, Victoria women's cricket team, Melbourne Stars, Melbourne Renegades, St Kilda Cricket Club, Melbourne Stars
Gymkhana Club Ground	7,000	Nairobi	Kenya	Kenya
Maple Leaf Cricket Club	7,000	King City	Canada	Canada
County Cricket Ground	6,500	Chelmsford	England	Essex County Cricket Club
County Ground	6,500	Northampton	England	Northants Steelbacks
Allan Border Field	6,500	Brisbane	Australia	Queensland Bulls, Queensland Fire
Grace Road	6,000	Leicester	England	Leicestershire County Cricket Club
County Cricket Ground, Hove	6,000	Brighton	England	Sussex County Cricket Club
Stormont	6,000	Belfast	Northern Ireland	Ireland, Northern Knights
Mannofield Park	6,000	Aberdeenshire	Scotland	Scotland, Aberdeenshire
Titwood	6,000	Glasgow	Scotland	Scotland, Clydesdale CC
Drummoyne Oval	6,000	Sydney	Australia	Sydney Sixers
University Oval	6,000	Dunedin	New Zealand	New Zealand, Otago Volts
Alokozay Kabul International Cricket Ground	6,000	Kabul	Afghanistan	Afghanistan
Khost Cricket Stadium	6,000	Khost	Afghanistan	Afghanistan
New Road	5,500	Worcester	England	Worcestershire County Cricket Club
North Dalton Park	5,430	Wollongong	Australia	New South Wales Cricket Association
Hurstville Oval	5,000	Sydney	Australia	St George Cricket Club, Sydney Sixers, New South Wales Blues
Bradman Oval	5,000	Bowral	Australia	New South Wales Blues
Sports Stadium, Berhampur	5,000	Berhampur	India	Odisha cricket team
Karen Rolton Oval	5,000	Adelaide	Australia	Australia
Lugogo Stadium	5,000	Kampala	Uganda	Uganda
Shenzhen Universiade Sports Centre	5,000	Shenzhen	China	China
National Cricket Stadium	5,000	Tangier	Morocco	Morocco
The Grange Club	5,000	Edinburgh	Scotland	Scotland
Ajman Oval	5,000	Ajman	United Arab Emirates	United Arab Emirates
Toronto Cricket Club	4,875	Toronto	Canada	Canada
VRA Cricket Ground	4,500	Amstelveen	Netherlands	Netherlands, VRA Amsterdam
St Helen's Rugby and Cricket Ground	4,500	Swansea	Wales	Glamorgan County Cricket Club
Mulpani International Cricket Ground	4,000	Kageshwari-Manohara	Nepal	Nepal
Terdthai Cricket Ground	4,000	Bangkok	Thailand	Thailand
Church Street Park	3,500	Morrisville, North Carolina	United States	United States
Goldenacre Sports Ground	3,500	Edinburgh	Scotland	Scotland
Mission Road Ground	3,500	Mong Kok	Hong Kong	Hong Kong
Oman Cricket Academy Ground 1	3,000	Muscat	Oman	Oman
Yeonhui Cricket Ground	3,000	Incheon	South Korea	South Korea
La Manga Club Ground	3,000	Cartagena	Spain	Spain
Moosa Stadium	2,500	Pearland	United States	United States
Amini Park	2,000	Port Moresby	Papua New Guinea	PNG
Three Ws Oval	2,000	Barbados	Barbados	West Indies, Combined Campuses and Colleges cricket team
Oman Cricket Academy Ground 2	2,000	Muscat	Oman	Oman
Sano Cricket Ground	2,000	Sano	Japan	Japan
Jaffery Sports Club Ground	2,000	Nairobi	Kenya	Kenya
Simba Union Ground	2,000	Nairobi	Kenya	Kenya
Royal Brussels Cricket Club	1,500	Waterloo	Belgium	Belgium
Hong Kong Cricket Club	1,500	Wong Nai Chung Gap	Hong Kong	Hong Kong
Pingfeng Campus Cricket Field	1,347	Hangzhou	China	China
Pierre Werner Cricket Ground	1,000	Walferdange	Luxembourg	Luxembourg, Optimists Cricket Club
Mombasa Sports Club Ground	1,000	Mombasa	Kenya	Kenya
Ruaraka Sports Club Ground	1,000	Nairobi	Kenya	Kenya
White Hill Field	1,000	Sandys Parish	Bermuda	Bermuda
Kowloon Cricket Club	1,000	Kowloon	Hong Kong	Hong Kong

== Stadiums under construction ==
Ground	Capacity	Country	City	Home team	Estimated completion date
Anil Agarwal Stadium	75,000	India	Chonp Village, Jaipur	India, Jaipur	2022-24
Shree Ram Janaki International Cricket Stadium	60,000+	Nepal	Janakpur	Janakpur Bolts	2024-30
Gautam Buddha International Cricket Stadium	60,000	Nepal	Chitwan	Nepal	2019-20
National Cricket Ground	50,000-70,000	Bangladesh	Purbachal New Town, Dhaka	Bangladesh	2026
Rafi Cricket Stadium	50,000	Pakistan	Karachi	Pakistan	2023-24
Girija Prasad Koirala Cricket Stadium	45,000	Nepal	Biratnagar	Nepal	2019-20
Fapla International Cricket Ground	40,000	Nepal	Dhangadhi	Nepal	2019-26
Jaffna International Cricket Stadium	40,000	Sri Lanka	Jaffna	Sri Lanka	2025-30
Sinhalese Sport Club Cricket Stadium	40,000	Sri Lanka	Colombo	Sri Lanka	2024
Deukhuri International Cricket Stadium	35,000+	Nepal	Lamahi, Dang	Nepal	2017-26
Imran Khan Cricket Stadium	35,000	Pakistan	Peshawar	Pakistan, Peshawar Zalmi	2022-24
ACA International Cricket Stadium	34,000	India	Amaravati	Andhra Pradesh Cricket Association	2019-20
Varanasi Cricket Stadium	30,000	India	Varanasi	Uttar Pradesh Cricket Association	2023-25
Dang International Cricket Stadium	30,000	Nepal	Ghorahi, Dang	Nepal	2017-25
Mulpani Cricket Stadium	25,000	Nepal	Kathmandu	Nepal	2017-24
Extra Tech Oval Cricket Stadium	25,000	Nepal	Tilottama	Nepal	2024-25
Kalinchowk International Cricket Ground	25,000	Nepal	Surkhet	Nepal	2024-27
LaGrange Cricket Stadium	25,000	(United States) US	Georgia	United States	2027
Breybourne Cricket Stadium	24,000	(United States) US	Oswego	United States	2028
Macquarie Point Stadium	23,000	Australia	Hobart	Australia Men's; Australia Women's; Hobart Hurricanes Men's; Hobart Hurricanes Women's	2029
Marylebone Jwala Cricket Ground	15,000	Nepal	Biratnagar	Nepal	2025
Gauritar International Cricket Stadium	6,000	Nepal	Hetauda	Kathmandu Gurkhas	2026-27
Farington Cricket Ground	5,000	England	Farington, Lancashire	Lancashire County Cricket Club	2025
Siddhartha Cricket Ground	1,000	Nepal	Bhairahawa	Lumbini, Bhairahawa Gladiators	2025
Kajini International Cricket Ground	1,000	Nepal	Suryodaya	Koshi	2025

== Former or demolished stadiums ==
Ground	Capacity	City	Country	Home team	Closed (as a cricket ground)	Cause
Sydney Showground (Moore Park)	90,000	Sydney	Australia		1998	
Jawaharlal Nehru Stadium	80,000	Kochi	India	India, Kerala cricket team, Kochi Tuskers Kerala	2017	Converted to football stadium
Football Park	51,000	Adelaide	Australia		2012	
Bangabandhu National Stadium	36,000	Dhaka	Bangladesh	Bangladesh	2006	converted to football-cum-athletics venue
Bramall Lane	35,000	Sheffield	England	Yorkshire County Cricket Club, The Wednesday Cricket Club , England cricket team for one test match in 1902	1973	Converted exclusively to a football stadium and now home to Sheffield United F.C.
Lancaster Park	35,000	Christchurch	New Zealand	New Zealand	2011	Destroyed in February 2011 Christchurch earthquake
Nassau County International Cricket Stadium	34,000	New York	United States	United States	2024	
Lal Bahadur Shastri Stadium	30,000	Hyderabad	India	India, Hyderabad cricket team	2003	
Carisbrook	29,000	Dunedin	New Zealand	New Zealand	2011	Demolished
Old Wanderers	28,000	Johannesburg	South Africa	South Africa	1939	
Brisbane Exhibition Ground	25,490	Brisbane	Australia	Queensland Bulls	1931	
Nehru Stadium	25,000	Guwahati	India	Assam Cricket Association	2010	Closed for renovation
Sheffield Park	25,000	Uckfield	England		1909	
Vidarbha Cricket Association Ground	20,000	Nagpur	India	Vidarbha cricket team	2010	Closed for renovation
Indira Priyadarshini Stadium	20,000	Vijayawada	India	Andhra cricket team	2005	
Queen Elizabeth II Park	20,000	Christchurch	New Zealand	Canterbury Wizards	2011	Destroyed in February 2011 Christchurch earthquake
Hyde Park Ground	16,000	Sheffield	England	Sheffield Cricket Club	1853	
Kinrara Academy Oval	4,000	Kuala Lumpur	Malaysia	Malaysia	2022	

== See also ==
- Lists of stadiums
- List of Test cricket grounds by date
- List of cricket grounds in India
- List of international cricket grounds in India
- List of international cricket grounds in Sri Lanka
- List of cricket grounds in South Africa
- List of cricket grounds in Australia
- List of cricket grounds in England and Wales
