= 2025 Prime Minister Cup =

7th edition of the Prime Minister Cup Men's National Cricket Tournament

- Tournament logo
- Dates: 9 – 29 March 2025
- Administrator(s): National Sports Council; Cricket Association of Nepal
- Cricket format: One Day
- Tournament format(s): Round-robin and Final
- Host: Nepal
- Champions: Nepal Police Club (4th title)
- Runners-up: Tribhuwan Army Club
- Participants: 10
- Matches: 46
- Player of the series: Lalit Rajbanshi (Nepal Police Club)
- Most runs: Arjun Kumal (Gandaki Province) (374)
- Most wickets: Lalit Rajbanshi (Nepal Police Club) (41)

The 2025 Prime Minister Cup also known as Nepal Telecom PM Cup 2025 for sponsorship reasons, was the seventh edition of the Prime Minister One Day Cup, the premier one-day cricket tournament in Nepal. The tournament was contested by teams representing the seven Provinces of Nepal as well as three departmental teams. It was the first time Cricket Association of Nepal (CAN) organized the tournament outside Kathmandu valley. It was begun on 9 March 2025 and played in three different venues across Lumbini Province, with 46 matches slated for play.

Nepal Police Club were the defending champions and successfully defended their title by defeating Tribhuwan Army Club in the final by 6 wickets, claiming the trophy for the fourth time.

== Background ==
The 7th edition of the tournament took place from March 9 to March 29, 2025, organised by the Cricket Association of Nepal (CAN) and the National Sports Council. It followed a round-robin format with 10 teams (seven provincial and three departmental), and a total of 46 matches were played across three venues in Lumbini Province. Matches were held at Deukhuri International Cricket Stadium, Extratech Oval (Tilottama), and Siddhartha Cricket Stadium. The tournament was fully hosted outside of Kathmandu Valley for the first time, marking a shift in the country's cricketing landscape.

== Squads ==
Nepal APF Club	Bagmati Province	Gandaki Province	Lumbini Province	Karnali Province
Rohit Paudel (c); Aasif Sheikh (wk); Sundeep Jora; Abinash Bohara; Bhuvan Karki; Kamal Airee; Kishor Mahato; Lokesh Bam; Mousom Dhakal; Irshad Ahamad; Amar Routela; Dipak Bohara; Puran BK; Sumit Maharjan; Abhisesh Gautam	Prithu Baskota (c); Bipin Acharya; Sonu Devkota; Rijan Dhakal; Rit Gautam; Pratish GC; Aashutosh Ghiraiya; Shubh Kansakar; Gautam KC; Bibek Magar (wk); Ishan Pandey; Shaurav Shakhakarmi; Suman Sunar; Surya Tamang; Nandan Yadav	Bipin Khatri (c); Sudip Aryal; Dinesh Budhamagar; Subash Bhandari; Vansh Chhetri; Rohit Chand; Sujan Gautam; Amrit Gurung; Deepak Dumre (wk); Samir Kandel (wk); Arjun Kumal; Sandeep Parajuli; Kamal Pariyar; Chandra Kanta Paudel; Muskan Thapa	Dev Khanal (c); Samrat Bhusal; Ajay Chauhan; Bir Gharti; Mrinal Gurung; Nirmal Gurung; Krishna Karki; Biparshan KC; Salauddin Khan; Ramesh Kurmi; Nar Sarki; Manish Thapa; Prajjwol Thapa (wk); Sushant Thapa; Akash Tripathi	Diwan Pun (c); Dinesh Adhikari; Anuj Chanara; Sunil Dhamala; Arjun Gharti (wk); Prakash Jaishi; Bipin Rawal (wk); Dipendra Rawat; Dinesh Rawat; Nischal Rawal; Bipin Sharma; Himanshu Shahi; Aditya Raj Shah; Rabindra Shahi; Unish Thakuri
Koshi Province	Madhesh Province	Nepal Police Club	Sudurpashchim Province	Tribhuwan Army Club
Ankit Subedi (c); Firdosh Ansari; Sonu Ansari; Aish Bhattarai; Sandip Dhungana; Suman Gahatraj; Shakib Haq (wk); Prakash Karki; Samir Karki; Dipesh Kandel; Shrawan Kisku; Bhupal Luitel; Bipin Mahato; Chirag Sah (wk); Sujan Thapaliya	Anil Sah (c); Rohan BK (wk); Dipesh Das; Kamal Gupta; Ranjit Kumar; Pradeep Paswan; Bishal Patel; Pawan Sarraf; Harishankar Shah; Shailendra Sah; Sunny Sah; Nikhil Singh; Rupesh Singh; Rajesh Yadav; Mayan Yadav	Dipendra Singh Airee (c); Kushal Bhurtel; Roshan Budal; Sagar Dhakal; Sunil Daulyal; Gulsan Jha; Karan KC; Rashid Khan; Dilip Nath; Lalit Rajbanshi; Shankar Rana; Arjun Saud (wk); Ameet Shrestha; Shrawan Yadav	Sher Malla (c); Bikash Agri; Rahul Bhandari; Bhoj Raj Bhatta; Sachin Bhatt; Arjun BK; Khadak Bohara; Milan Bohara; Sunil Chand; Nischal Chhetri; Hemant Dhami; Prakash Pandey; Tek Rawat (wk); Saurya Shrestha; Kiran Thagunna	Binod Bhandari (c); Basir Ahamad; Shahab Alam; Aakash Chand; Trit Raj Das; Anish Dhami; Durgesh Gupta; Sompal Kami; Pawan Karki; Santosh Karki (wk); Kushal Malla; Naren Saud; Bhim Sharki; Imran Sheikh; Bibek Yadav

== Venue ==
Nepal
Lamahi	Tilottama	Siddharthanagar
Deukhuri International Cricket Stadium	Extratech Oval	Siddhartha Cricket Stadium
Capacity: 5,000	Capacity: 5,000+	Capacity: 2,500+
2025 Prime Minister Cup is located in Nepal

== Team and standings ==
=== Points table ===
Pos	Team	Pld	W	L	NR	Pts	NRR	Qualification
1	Nepal Police Club	9	8	1	0	16	1.940	Advanced to the final and qualified for the 2025–26 Jay Trophy
2	Tribhuwan Army Club	9	8	1	0	16	1.568	Advanced to the final and qualified for the 2025–26 Jay Trophy
3	Nepal APF Club	9	7	2	0	14	0.528	Qualified for the 2025–26 Jay Trophy
4	Bagmati Province	9	4	5	0	8	0.078	Qualified for the 2025–26 Jay Trophy
5	Lumbini Province	9	4	5	0	8	−0.344	Eliminated
6	Karnali Province	9	4	5	0	8	−0.336	Eliminated
7	Madhesh Province	9	4	5	0	8	−0.374	Eliminated
8	Sudurpashchim Province	9	3	6	0	6	−0.625	Eliminated
9	Gandaki Province	9	2	7	0	4	−1.171	Eliminated
10	Koshi Province	9	1	8	0	2	−1.191	Eliminated

Source: ESPNcricinfo

=== Match summary ===
Team	Group matches									Play-offs
Team	1	2	3	4	5	6	7	8	9	Final
Bagmati Province	0	0	2	2	4	4	6	8	8	
Gandaki Province	0	2	2	2	2	2	2	2	4	
Karnali Province	2	2	2	2	4	6	8	8	8	
Koshi Province	0	0	0	0	2	2	2	2	2	
Lumbini Province	2	2	4	6	8	8	8	8	8	
Madhesh Province	2	2	2	2	4	4	4	6	8	
Nepal APF Club	2	4	4	6	6	8	10	12	14	
Nepal Police Club	2	4	6	8	10	12	14	16	16	W
Sudurpashchim Province	0	2	2	2	2	4	4	6	6	
Tribhuwan Army Club	2	4	6	8	10	10	12	14	16	L

Win	Loss	Tie	No result	Eliminated

- Note: The total points at the end of each group match are listed.
- Note: Click on the points or results to see the match summary.

== League stage ==
CAN released the fixtures details on 21 February 2025.

Match 1
9 March 2025
09:00
Scorecard

Lumbini Province; 208 (48 overs)	v	Koshi Province; 182 (42.4 overs)
Aakash Tripathi 66 (90); Dipesh Kandel 3/27 (10 overs)		Sujan Thapaliya 35 (53); Ajay Chauhan 5/32 (8.4 overs)

Lumbini Province won by 26 runs
Siddhartha Cricket Stadium, Siddharthanagar
Umpires: Himal Giri and Rabindra Gupta
Player of the match: Ajay Chauhan (Lumbini Province)

- Lumbini Province won the toss and elected to bat.

Match 2
9 March 2025
09:00
Scorecard

Nepal APF Club; 174 (44 overs)	v	Bagmati Province; 74 (28.2 overs)
Sundeep Jora 37 (62); Rijan Dhakal 5/30 (8 overs)		Shubh Kansakar 16 (24); Kamal Singh Airee 4/27 (8.2 overs)

Nepal APF Club won by 100 runs
Extratech Oval, Tilottama
Umpires: Ram Pandey and Pravin Thapa
Player of the match: Kamal Singh Airee (Nepal APF Club)

- Bagmati Province won the toss and elected to field.

Match 3
9 March 2025
09:00
Scorecard

Karnali Province; 155 (40.4 overs)	v	Sudurpashchim Province; 76 (21 overs)
Arjun Gharti 71 (94); Hemant Dhami 4/26 (9 overs)		Khadak Bohora 27 (25); Dipendra Rawat 7/33 (9 overs)

Karnali Province won by 79 runs
Deukhuri International Cricket Stadium, Lamahi
Umpires: Manmohan Lamsal and Kamlesh Thakur
Player of the match: Dipendra Rawat (Karnali Province)

- Karnali Province won the toss and elected to bat.
- The match was reduced to 43 overs per side due to wet outfield.

Match 4
10 March 2025
09:00
Scorecard

Tribhuwan Army Club; 262/8 (50 overs)	v	Bagmati Province; 128 (27 overs)
Santosh Karki 76 (98); Ishan Pandey 2/11 (3.4 overs)		Bibek Magar 51 (50); Shahab Alam 4/33 (8 overs)

Tribhuwan Army Club won by 134 runs
Siddhartha Cricket Stadium, Siddharthanagar
Umpires: Ram Pandey and Mukesh Kumar Sah
Player of the match: Santosh Karki (Tribhuwan Army Club)

- Tribhuwan Army Club won the toss and elected to bat.

Match 5
10 March 2025
09:00
Scorecard

Nepal Police Club; 249/6 (50 overs)	v	Lumbini Province; 162/9 (50 overs)
Kushal Bhurtel 59 (75); Ajay Chauhan 3/38 (10 overs)		Prajjwol Thapa 72 (94); Sagar Dhakal 3/32 (10 overs)

Nepal Police Club won by 87 runs
Extratech Oval, Tilottama
Umpires: Ranindra Gupta and Vinay Kumar Jha
Player of the match: Kushal Bhurtel (Nepal Police Club)

- Nepal Police Club won the toss and elected to bat.

Match 6
10 March 2025
09:00
Scorecard

Gandaki Province; 220/8 (50 overs)	v	Sudurpashchim Province; 222/4 (43 overs)
Deepak Dumre 60 (74); Sher Malla 3/34 (10 overs)		Kiran Thagunna 121* (101); Arjun Kumal 1/28 (4 overs)

Sudurpaschim Province won by 6 wickets
Deukhuri International Cricket Stadium, Lamahi
Umpires: Manoj Das and Inamuddin Halwai
Player of the match: Kiran Thagunna (Sudurpashchim Province)

- Gandaki Province won the toss and elected to bat.

Match 7
11 March 2025
09:00
Scorecard

Madhesh Province; 284/6 (50 overs)	v	Koshi Province; 119 (33 overs)
Pawan Sarraf 92 (85); Bipin Mahato 2/44 (7 overs)		Shakib Haq 25 (47); Rupesh Singh 5/29 (9 overs)

Madhesh Province won by 165 runs
Siddhartha Cricket Stadium, Siddharthanagar
Umpires: Ram Pandey and Vinay Kumar Jha
Player of the match: Pawan Sarraf (Madhesh Province)

- Madhesh Province won the toss and elected to bat.

Match 8
11 March 2025
09:00
Scorecard

Karnali Province; 91 (27.2 overs)	v	Gandaki Province; 95/6 (29.1 overs)
Bipin Shahi 20 (57); Subash Bhandari 2/17 (5.2 overs)		Deepak Dumre 50* (78); Diwan Pun 3/13 (10 overs)

Gandaki Province won by 4 wickets
Deukhuri International Cricket Stadium, Lamahi
Umpires: Manmohan Lamsal and Kamlesh Thakur
Player of the match: Deepak Dumre (Gandaki Province)

- Gandaki Province won the toss and elected to field.

Match 9
12 March 2025
09:00
Scorecard

Sudurpashchim Province; 117 (45.3 overs)	v	Tribhuwan Army Club; 119/2 (23.5 overs)
Nischal Kshetri 49* (121); Shahab Alam 4/19 (10 overs)		Santosh Karki 55* (63); Milan Bohara 1/13 (5 overs)

Tribhuwan Army Club won by 8 wickets
Siddhartha Cricket Stadium, Siddharthanagar
Umpires: Himal Giri and Vinay Kumar Jha
Player of the match: Shahab Alam (Tribhuwan Army Club)

- Sudurpashchim Province won the toss and elected to bat.

Match 10
12 March 2025
09:00
Scorecard

Nepal Police Club; 288/8 (50 overs)	v	Koshi Province; 134 (36.2 overs)
Kushal Bhurtel 65 (78); Bhupal Luitel 3/37 (10 overs)		Sujan Thapaliya 33* (52); Karan KC 3/29 (8 overs)

Nepal Police Club won by 154 runs
Extratech Oval, Tilottama
Umpires: Ram Pandey and Mukesh Kumar Shah
Player of the match: Kushal Bhurtel (Nepal Police Club)

- Nepal Police Club won the toss and elected to bat.

Match 11
13 March 2025
09:00
Scorecard

Lumbini Province; 217 (49.5 overs)	v	Gandaki Province; 203/9 (50 overs)
Prajjwol Thapa 72 (79); Amrit Gurung 3/20 (3.5 overs)		Arjun Kumal 62 (86); Nirmal Gurung 3/31 (8 overs)

Lumbini Province won by 14 runs
Siddhartha Cricket Stadium, Siddharthanagar
Umpires: Ujjwal Regmi and Prabin Thapa
Player of the match: Prajjwol Thapa (Lumbini Province)

- Gandaki Province won the toss and elected to field.

Match 12
13 March 2025
09:00
Scorecard

Tribhuwan Army Club; 262/9 (50 overs)	v	Karnali Province; 135 (37.1 overs)
Trit Raj Das 69 (84); Prakash Jaishi 4/64 (10 overs)		Prakash Jaishi 50* (72); Shahab Alam 3/28 (10 overs)

Tribhuwan Army Club won by 127 runs
Extratech Oval, Tilottama
Umpires: Ranindra Gupta and Mukesh Kumar Sah
Player of the match: Trit Raj Das (Tribhuwan Army Club)

- Karnali Province won the toss and elected to field.

Match 13
13 March 2025
09:00
Scorecard

Madhesh Province; 168 (40.4 overs)	v	Nepal APF Club; 170/8 (36.5 overs)
Pawan Sarraf 77 (77); Kamal Singh Airee 4/55 (9 overs)		Sumit Maharjan 35 (48); Kamal Gupta 4/40 (10 overs)

Nepal APF Club won by 2 wickets
Deukhuri International Cricket Stadium, Lamahi
Umpires: Hem Raj Bhatta and Manoj Das
Player of the match: Kamal Singh Airee (Nepal APF Club)

- Madhesh Province won the toss and elected to bat.

Match 14
14 March 2025
09:00
Scorecard

Bagmati Province; 266/8 (50 overs)	v	Sudurpashchim Province; 211 (47 overs)
Shubh Kansakar 77 (68); Saurya Shrestha 2/38 (9 overs)		Tek Rawat 45 (88); Rijan Dhakal 4/30 (10 overs)

Bagmati Province won by 55 runs
Extratech Oval, Tilottama
Umpires: Ram Pandey and Ujjwal Regmi
Player of the match: Shubh Kansakar (Bagmati Province)

- Bagmati Province won the toss and elected to bat.

Match 15
14 March 2025
09:00
Scorecard

Nepal APF Club; 94 (27.4 overs)	v	Nepal Police Club; 97/8 (26.2 overs)
Sundeep Jora 26 (39); Lalit Rajbanshi 6/18 (7.4 overs)		Kushal Bhurtel 31 (57); Bhuvan Karki 3/33 (7 overs)

Nepal Police Club won by 2 wickets
Deukhuri International Cricket Stadium, Lamahi
Umpires: Inamuddin Halwai and Kamlesh Thakur
Player of the match: Lalit Rajbanshi (Nepal Police Club)

- Nepal APF Club won the toss and elected to bat.

Match 16
15 March 2025
09:00
Scorecard

Koshi Province; 230 (49.3 overs)	v	Tribhuwan Army Club; 231/3 (47.1 overs)
Suvan Gahataraj 51 (57); Sompal Kami 4/37 (8 overs)		Trit Raj Das 122* (139); Bhupal Luitel 1/29 (10 overs)

Tribhuwan Army Club won by 7 wickets
Siddhartha Cricket Stadium, Siddharthanagar
Umpires: Himal Giri and Vinay Kumar Jha
Player of the match: Trit Raj Das (Tribhuwan Army Club)

- Koshi Province won the toss and elected to bat.

Match 17
15 March 2025
09:00
Scorecard

Nepal Police Club; 288 (49.5 overs)	v	Madhesh Province; 95 (26.1 overs)
Dipendra Singh Airee 63 (36); Rupesh Singh 4/62 (8.5 overs)		Dipesh Das 31 (59); Lalit Rajbanshi 5/28 (9.1 overs)

Nepal Police Club won by 193 runs
Deukhuri International Cricket Stadium, Lamahi
Umpires: Hem Raj Bhatta and Kamlesh Thakur
Player of the match: Lalit Rajbanshi (Nepal Police Club)

- Nepal Police Club won the toss and elected to bat.

Match 18
16 March 2025
09:00
Scorecard

Karnali Province; 189 (47 overs)	v	Nepal APF Club; 193/5 (39.2 overs)
Sunil Dhamala 47 (75); Avishek Gautam 4/33 (10 overs)		Dipak Bohara 70* (67); Diwan Pun 2/25 (10 overs)

Nepal APF Club won by 5 wickets
Siddhartha Cricket Stadium, Siddharthanagar
Umpires: Ujjwal Regmi and Mukesh Kumar Sah
Player of the match: Dipak Bohara (Nepal APF Club)

- Karnali Province won the toss and elected to bat.

Match 19
16 March 2025
09:00
Scorecard

Gandaki Province; 31 (20.4 overs)	v	Koshi Province; 32/1 (8.2 overs)
Arjun Kumal 9 (8); Bipin Mahato 6/17 (8 overs)		Shakib Haq 16* (22); Subash Bhandari 1/5 (1.2 overs)

Koshi Province won by 9 wickets
Extratech Oval, Tilottama
Umpires: Rabindra Gupta and Vinay Kumar Jha
Player of the match: Bipin Mahato (Koshi Province)

- Gandaki Province won the toss and elected to bat.
- This was second lowest total in Prime Minister Cup history.

Match 20
16 March 2025
09:00
Scorecard

Lumbini Province; 115 (32.4 overs)	v	Bagmati Province; 67 (22.5 overs)
Aakash Tripathi 33 (53); Gautam KC 4/21 (5.4 overs)		Prithu Baskota 15 (25); Biprason KC 3/13 (6 overs)

Lumbini Province won by 48 runs
Deukhuri International Cricket Stadium, Lamahi
Umpires: Manoj Das and Hem Raj Bhatta
Player of the match: Biprason KC (Lumbini Province)

- Lumbini Province won the toss and elected to bat.

Match 21
17 March 2025
09:00
Scorecard

Nepal Police Club; 160 (47 overs)	v	Sudurpashchim Province; 99 (28.3 overs)
Dipendra Singh Airee 42 (47); Saurya Shrestha 4/43 (10 overs)		Sher Malla 32 (37); Lalit Rajbanshi 6/16 (7 overs)

Nepal Police Club won by 61 runs
Siddhartha Cricket Stadium, Siddharthanagar
Umpires: Vinay Kumar Jha and Mukesh Kumar Sah
Player of the match: Lalit Rajbanshi (Nepal Police Club)

- Nepal Police Club won the toss and elected to bat.

Match 22
17 March 2025
09:00
Scorecard

Nepal APF Club; 141 (42.3 overs)	v	Tribhuwan Army Club; 145/7 (42.5 overs)
Sundeep Jora 65 (91); Aakash Chand 4/35 (10 overs)		Kushal Malla 31* (59); Rohit Paudel 2/9 (7 overs)

Tribhuwan Army Club won by 3 wickets
Extratech Oval, Tilottama
Umpires: Ram Pandey and Prabin Thapa
Player of the match: Sompal Kami (Tribhuwan Army Club)

- Tribhuwan Army Club won the toss and elected to field.

Match 23
17 March 2025
09:00
Scorecard

Lumbini Province; 158 (46 overs)	v	Madhesh Province; 75 (26.5 overs)
Aakash Tripathi 73 (123); Bishal Patel 3/13 (5 overs)		Dipesh Das 23 (59); Ramesh Kurmi 4/10 (8 overs)

Lumbini Province won by 83 runs
Deukhuri International Cricket Stadium, Lamahi
Umpires: Manoj Das and Kamlesh Thakur
Player of the match: Aakash Tripathi (Lumbini Province)

- Madhesh Province won the toss and elected to field.

Match 24
18 March 2025
09:00
Scorecard

Bagmati Province; 288/8 (50 overs)	v	Gandaki Province; 219 (44 overs)
Ishan Pandey 69 (82); Arjun Kumal 4/40 (7 overs)		Vansh Chhetri 55 (90); Ishan Pandey 4/27 (6 overs)

Bagmati Province won by 69 runs
Siddhartha Cricket Stadium, Siddharthanagar
Umpires: Ram Pandey and Ujjwal Regmi
Player of the match: Ishan Pandey (Bagmati Province)

- Gandaki Province won the toss and elected to field.

Match 25
18 March 2025
09:00
Scorecard

Karnali Province; 218/9 (50 overs)	v	Koshi Province; 91 (35 overs)
Arjun Gharti 88* (95); Bipin Mahato 3/47 (9 overs)		Chirag Sah 25 (52); Dipendra Rawat 3/13 (5 overs)

Karnali Province won by 127 runs
Extratech Oval, Tilottama
Umpires: Himal Giri and Vinay Kumar Jha
Player of the match: Arjun Gharti (Karnali Province)

- Karnali Province won the toss and elected to bat.

Match 26
19 March 2025
09:00
Scorecard

Gandaki Province; 92 (23.2 overs)	v	Nepal Police Club; 94/3 (16 overs)
Arjun Kumal 48 (63); Lalit Rajbanshi 5/7 (5.2 overs)		Dipendra Singh Airee 54 (23); Bipin Khatri 1/40 (5 overs)

Nepal Police Club won by 7 wickets
Siddhartha Cricket Stadium, Siddharthanagar
Umpires: Ram Pandey and Prabin Thapa
Player of the match: Gulsan Jha (Nepal Police Club)

- Gandaki Province won the toss and elected to bat.

Match 27
19 March 2025
09:00
Scorecard

Lumbini Province; 116 (44.1 overs)	v	Sudurpashchim Province; 117/5 (31.1 overs)
Dev Khanal 41 (71); Hemant Dhami 4/26 (9 overs)		Kiran Thagunna 43* (43); Ramesh Kurmi 2/23 (8 overs)

Sudurpaschim Province won by 5 wickets
Extratech Oval, Tilottama
Umpires: Himal Giri and Ujjwal Regmi
Player of the match: Hemant Dhami (Sudurpashchim Province)

- Lumbini Province won the toss and elected to bat.

Match 28
19 March 2025
09:00
Scorecard

Tribhuwan Army Club; 217/7 (50 overs)	v	Madhesh Province; 219/7 (48 overs)
Bhim Sharki 89 (126); Pawan Sarraf 2/22 (5 overs)		Anil Sah 45 (48); Naren Saud 3/54 (10 overs)

Madhesh Province won by 3 wickets
Deukhuri International Cricket Stadium, Lamahi
Umpires: Hem Raj Bhatta and Inamuddin Halwai
Player of the match: Rupesh Singh (Madhesh Province)

- Tribhuwan Army Club won the toss and elected to bat.

Match 29
20 March 2025
09:00
Scorecard

Karnali Province; 205 (48.5 overs)	v	Lumbini Province; 200 (49.4 overs)
Dipendra Rawat 66 (84); Ramesh Kurmi 3/37 (10 overs)		Prajjwol Thapa 84 (107); Dipendra Rawat 3/41 (10 overs)

Karnali Province won by 5 runs
Siddhartha Cricket Stadium, Siddharthanagar
Umpires: Vinay Kumar Jha and Prabin Thapa
Player of the match: Dipendra Rawat (Karnali Province)

- Karnali Province won the toss and elected to bat.

Match 30
20 March 2025
09:00
Scorecard

Nepal Police Club; 297/8 (50 overs)	v	Bagmati Province; 204 (45.2 overs)
Kushal Bhurtel 88 (98); Pratis GC 3/46 (10 overs)		Ishan Pandey 70 (98); Lalit Rajbanshi 4/34 (10 overs)

Nepal Police Club won by 93 runs
Extratech Oval, Tilottama
Umpires: Sanjay Gurung and Mukesh Kumar Sah
Player of the match: Kushal Bhurtel (Nepal Police Club)

- Nepal Police Club won the toss and elected to bat.

Match 31
21 March 2025
09:00
Scorecard

Sudurpashchim Province; 191 (48.5 overs)	v	Nepal APF Club; 192/7 (36.3 overs)
Nischal Kshetri 57 (92); Amar Routela 3/31 (9 overs)		Sundeep Jora 51 (68); Narayan Joshi 2/19 (4 overs)

Nepal APF Club won by 3 wickets
Siddhartha Cricket Stadium, Siddharthanagar
Umpires: Himal Giri and Sanjay Gurung
Player of the match: Amar Routela (Nepal APF Club)

- Sudurpashchim Province won the toss and elected to bat.

Match 32
21 March 2025
09:00
Scorecard

Karnali Province; 220 (49.1 overs)	v	Madhesh Province; 139 (35.2 overs)
Dipendra Rawat 61 (92); Anil Sah 2/17 (5.1 overs)		Rupesh Singh 30 (53); Dinesh Adhikari 4/41 (10 overs)

Karnali Province won by 81 runs
Extratech Oval, Tilottama
Umpires: Rabindra Gupta and Ram Pandey
Player of the match: Dipendra Rawat (Karnali Province)

- Karnali Province won the toss and elected to bat.

Match 33
21 March 2025
09:00
Scorecard

Gandaki Province; 116 (30.3 overs)	v	Tribhuwan Army Club; 117/4 (26.5 overs)
Arjun Kumal 33 (49); Shahab Alam 4/42 (10 overs)		Trit Raj Das 37 (68); Bipin Khatri 1/20 (4 overs)

Tribhuwan Army Club won by 6 wickets
Deukhuri International Cricket Stadium, Lamahi
Umpires: Hiralal Raut and Naresh Thapa
Player of the match: Shahab Alam (Tribhuwan Army Club)

- Tribhuwan Army Club won the toss and elceted to field.

Match 34
22 March 2025
09:00
Scorecard

Bagmati Province; 240 (49.3 overs)	v	Koshi Province; 109 (25.3 overs)
Shubh Kansakar 39 (28); Sujan Thapaliya 2/24 (4 overs)		Aaish Bhattarai 37 (39); Surya Tamang 5/27 (9 overs)

Bagmati Province won by 131 runs
Deukhuri International Cricket Stadium, Lamahi
Umpires: Inamuddin Halwai and Hiralal Raut
Player of the match: Surya Tamang (Bagmati Province)

- Bagmati Province won the toss and elected to bat.

Match 35
23 March 2025
09:00
Scorecard

Tribhuwan Army Club; 243 (49.2 overs)	v	Lumbini Province; 112 (27.1 overs)
Basir Ahamad 86 (104); Ajay Chauhan 4/47 (10 overs)		Dev Khanal 37 (46); Shahab Alam 4/25 (9.1 overs)

Tribhuwan Army Club won by 131 runs
Siddhartha Cricket Stadium, Siddharthanagar
Umpires: Ujjwal Regmi and Mukesh Kumar Sah
Player of the match: Basir Ahamad (Tribhuwan Army Club)

- Tribhuwan Army Club won the toss and elected to bat.

Match 36
23 March 2025
09:00
Scorecard

Nepal APF Club; 258 (49.2 overs)	v	Gandaki Province; 227/8 (50 overs)
Aasif Sheikh 80 (74); Sudip Aryal 3/35 (8 overs)		Arjun Kumal 39 (82); Avishek Gautam 3/29 (10 overs)

Nepal APF Club won by 31 runs
Extratech Oval, Tilottama
Umpires: Rabindra Gupta and Vinay Kumar Jha
Player of the match: Aasif Sheikh (Nepal APF Club)

- Gandaki Province won the toss and elected to field.

Match 37
23 March 2025
09:00
Scorecard

Sudurpashchim Province; 242 (43.4 overs)	v	Koshi Province; 211 (45.1 overs)
Kiran Thagunna 115 (91); Gyanendra Shrestha 4/48 (9.4 overs)		Shakib Haq 62 (66); Saurya Shrestha 3/45 (9 overs)

Sudurpaschim Province won by 31 runs
Deukhuri International Cricket Stadium, Lamahi
Umpires: Hiralal Raut and Naresh Thapa
Player of the match: Kiran Thagunna (Sudurpashchim Province)

- Sudurpashchim Province won the toss and elected to bat.

Match 38
24 March 2025
09:00
Scorecard

Madhesh Province; 246/7 (50 overs)	v	Gandaki Province; 246 (49.5 overs)
Rohan BK 64 (98); Bipin Khatri 2/33 (10 overs)		Arjun Kumal 106 (140); Bishal Patel 4/52 (8.5 overs)

Match tied (Gandaki Province won the Super Over)
Siddhartha Cricket Stadium, Siddharthanagar
Umpires: Sanjay Gurung and Ram Pandey
Player of the match: Arjun Kumal (Gandaki Province)

- Madhesh Province won the toss and elected to bat.
- Super Over: Gandaki Province 22/2, Madhesh Province 10/0.

Match 39
24 March 2025
09:00
Scorecard

Lumbini Province; 223/8 (50 overs)	v	Nepal APF Club; 224/3 (41.5 overs)
Dev Khanal 63 (79); Amar Routela 3/45 (10 overs)		Puran BK 72* (112); Rajendra Bam 3/39 (5 overs)

Nepal APF Club won by 7 wickets
Extratech Oval, Tilottama
Umpires: Himal Giri and Vinay Kumar Jha
Player of the match: Rohit Paudel (Nepal APF Club)

- Lumbini Province won the toss and elected to bat.

Match 40
24 March 2025
09:00
Scorecard

Karnali Province; 58 (19.1 overs)	v	Bagmati Province; 62/1 (6.3 overs)
Sunil Dhamala 15 (27); Rijan Dhakal 5/19 (8.1 overs)		Ishan Pandey 22 (11); Dipendra Rawat 1/29 (3 overs)

Bagmati Province won by 9 wickets
Deukhuri International Cricket Stadium, Lamahi
Umpires: Inamuddin Halwai and Kamlesh Thakur
Player of the match: Rijan Dhakal (Bagmati Province)

- Karnali Province won the toss and elected to bat.

Match 41
25 March 2025
09:00
Scorecard

Madhesh Province; 102 (42.3 overs)	v	Sudurpashchim Province; 58 (29 overs)
Pradip Paswan 23* (52); Sher Malla 4/5 (10 overs)		Hemant Dhami 19 (33); Bishal Patel 6/18 (6 overs)

Madhesh Province won by 44 runs
Extratech Oval, Tilottama
Umpires: Sanjay Gurung and Ram Pandey
Player of the match: Bishal Patel (Madhesh Province)

- Sudurpashchim Province won the toss and elected to field.

Match 42
25 March 2025
09:00
Scorecard

Nepal Police Club; 147 (48 overs)	v	Karnali Province; 103 (24 overs)
Arjun Saud 36 (60); Anuj Chanara 4/29 (10 overs)		Rabindra Shahi 49 (32); Lalit Rajbanshi 6/41 (9 overs)

Nepal Police Club won by 44 runs
Deukhuri International Cricket Stadium, Lamahi
Umpires: Hiralal Raut and Kamlesh Thakur
Player of the match: Lalit Rajbanshi (Nepal Police Club)

- Karnali Province won the toss and elected to field.
- Lalit Rajbanshi (Nepal Police Club) became the first bowler to get 100 wickets in Prime Minister Cup.

Match 43
26 March 2025
09:00
Scorecard

Koshi Province; 254 (50 overs)	v	Nepal APF Club; 258/8 (44.4 overs)
Shakib Haq 68 (63); Avishek Gautam 3/39 (10 overs)		Lokesh Bam 84* (54); Dipesh Kandel 3/32 (10 overs)

Nepal APF Club won by 2 wickets
Siddhartha Cricket Stadium, Siddharthanagar
Umpires: Rabindra Gupta and Mukesh Kumar Sah
Player of the match: Lokesh Bam (Nepal APF Club)

- Koshi Province won the toss and elected to bat.

Match 44
27 March 2025
09:00
Scorecard

Bagmati Province; 259/8 (50 overs)	v	Madhesh Province; 263/6 (46.1 overs)
Ishan Pandey 114 (127); Harishankar Shah 2/34 (10 overs)		Anil Sah 70* (53); Surya Tamang 2/44 (10 overs)

Madhesh Province won by 4 wickets
Siddhartha Cricket Stadium, Siddharthanagar
Umpires: Sanjay Gurung and Ram Pandey
Player of the match: Anil Sah (Madhesh Province)

- Madhesh Province won the toss and elected to field.

Match 45
27 March 2025
09:00
Scorecard

Nepal Police Club; 148 (41.1 overs)	v	Tribhuwan Army Club; 149/6 (41 overs)
Dipendra Singh Airee 50 (37); Shahab Alam 4/31 (10 overs)		Bibek Yadav 41* (45); Lalit Rajbanshi 4/34 (10 overs)

Tribhuwan Army Club won by 4 wickets
Extratech Oval, Tilottama
Umpires: Himil Giri and Vinay Kumar Jha
Player of the match: Shahab Alam (Tribhuwan Army Club)

- Tribhuwan Army Club won the toss and elected to field.

== Final ==
Final
29 March 2025
09:30
Scorecard

Tribhuwan Army Club; 154 (43 overs)	v	Nepal Police Club; 157/4 (25.2 overs)
Basir Ahamad 86* (104); Sagar Dhakal 3/29 (8 overs)		Kushal Bhurtel 61 (70); Shahab Alam 3/51 (10 overs)

Nepal Police Club won by 6 wickets
Siddhartha Cricket Stadium, Siddharthanagar
Umpires: Vinay Kumar Jha and Ram Pandey
Player of the match: Karan KC (Nepal Police Club)

- Nepal Police Club won the toss and elected to field.

== Statistics and awards ==
=== Most runs ===
Runs	Player	Team	Mat	Inns	Ave	SR	HS	100	50	4s	6s
374	Arjun Kumal	Gandaki Province	9	9	41.55	68.37	106	1	2	42	2
365	Trit Raj Das	Tribhuwan Army Club	10	10	40.55	68.73	112*	1	1	48	3
363	Ishan Pandey	Bagmati Province	9	9	40.33	79.25	114	1	2	38	1
338	Basir Ahamad	Tribhuwan Army Club	10	9	56.33	76.47	86*	0	3	28	3
337	Kiran Thagunna	Sudurpashchim Province	9	9	48.14	106.64	121*	2	0	32	14
Source: ESPNcricinfo

=== Most wickets ===
Wkts	Player	Team	Mat	Inns	BBI	Avg	Econ	SR	4w	5w
41	Lalit Rajbanshi	Nepal Police Club	10	10	6/15	5.65	2.75	12.31	4	5
31	Shahab Alam	Tribhuwan Army Club	10	10	5/42	11.2	3.58	18.61	4	1
23	Rijan Dhakal	Bagmati Province	9	9	5/19	14.00	4.30	19.52	1	2
22	Dipendra Rawat	Karnali Province	9	9	7/33	13.22	3.85	20.54	0	1
19	Ajay Chauhan	Lumbini Province	9	9	5/32	16.15	3.82	25.36	1	1
Source: ESPNcricinfo

=== End of season awards ===
- Player of the series: Lalit Rajbanshi (Nepal Police Club)
- Best Batter: Arjun Kumal (Gandaki Province)
- Best Bowler: Lalit Rajbanshi (Nepal Police Club)
- Emerging Player: Trit Raj Das (Tribhuwan Army Club)
