= List of cricket grounds in Nepal =

Major current and under construction cricket grounds in Nepal
Green dot represents Major current cricket stadium
Red dot represents Major under construction cricket grounds

This is a list of cricket grounds in Nepal that have been used for first-class, List A and Twenty20 cricket games. Nepal have 4 international cricket venues i.e. two at Mulpani, one at Kirtipur and other one at Pokhara.

== Major Venues ==
Grounds listed in bold have hosted at least one international cricket match.

Ground Name	Province	City	Current Capacity	After Completion	Notes	Ref
**Tribhuvan University International Cricket Ground**	Bagmati	Kirtipur	13,000	30,000	Nepal's first ever cricket stadium to have flood lights	
**Mulpani International Cricket Ground**	Bagmati	Kageshwari-Manohara	4,000	-		
**Pokhara International Cricket Stadium**	Gandaki	Pokhara	5,000+	18,000	Only WT20I Matches played	
Mulpani Cricket Stadium	Bagmati	Kageshwari-Manohara	5,000	25,000	Under Construction	
Gautam Buddha International Cricket Stadium	Bagmati	Bharatpur	15,000	30,000	Under Construction	
Extratech Oval	Lumbini	Tilottama	5,000+	25,000	Set to finished first phase in 2025 January	
Shree Ram Janaki Cricket Stadium	Madhesh	Janakpur	3,000+	45,000	Proposed expansion	
Narayani Cricket Ground	Madhesh	Birgunj	5,000	18,000		
Baijnathpur Cricket Ground	Koshi	Biratnagar	5,000+	25,000	Proposed expansion	
Deukhuri International Cricket Stadium	Lumbini	Lamahi	5,000	25,000		
Fapla International Cricket Ground	Sudurpashchim	Dhangadhi	5,000	40,000	Proposed expansion	
Siddhartha Cricket Stadium	Lumbini	Siddharthanagar	2,500+	15,000	Under expansion	
Kalungchowk Cricket Ground	Karnali	Birendranagar	3,000	25,000		
Shaheed Sulabh International Cricket Stadium	Lumbini	Kohalpur	2,000	20,000	Proposed expansion	

=== Regional Grounds ===
Ground Name	Province	City	Capacity	Notes	Ref.
Pulchowk Engineering Campus Ground	Bagmati	Lalitpur	5,000	Hosted 1998 ACC Trophy,2010 ICC WCL Division Five, &2011,2013 ACC Twenty20 Cup	
Gauritar Cricket Stadium	Bagmati	Hetauda (Gauritar)	1,500		
Mechi Campus Cricket Ground	Koshi	Bhadrapur	3,000		
Dharan Cricket Ground	Koshi	Dharan (Bhanu Marg)	N/A		
Dr. Khalil Azad Cricket Ground	Koshi	Bhokhraha	N/A	KPL season 2 hosted by this ground	
Inaruwa Rangasala	Koshi	Inaruwa	N/A	First night cricket tournament happened in this stadium.	
Degree Campus Ground	Koshi	Biratnagar	N/A		
Katahari Cricket Ground	Koshi	Katahari	N/A		
Janta Campus Cricket Ground	Koshi	Rangeli	N/A	Yearly ongoing local tournament	
Chopraha Cricket Ground	Koshi	Rangeli	N/A	Continuously hosting regional tournament	
Betauna Cricket Ground	Madhesh	Rautahat	N/A	Continuously hosting regional tournament	
Siddeshwor Cricket Ground	Madhesh	Kalaiya	N/A		
Barhabigha Ground	Madhesh	Janakpur	N/A		
JCF Cricket Ground	Madhesh	Janakpur	N/A		
Jaleshwar Stadium	Madhesh	Jaleshwar	N/A		
Mahottari Cricket Ground	Madhesh	Jaleshwar	N/A		
Rajbiraj Stadium	Madhesh	Rajbiraj	7,000		
Huprachaur Cricket Ground	Bagmati	Hetauda	3,000		
Laboratory School Ground	Bagmati	Kirtipur	N/A		
St. Xavier's School Ground	Bagmati	Godawari	N/A	Hosted 1998 ACC Trophy	
Gaidakot Ground	Gandaki	Gaidakot	N/A		
Kawasoti Cricket Ground	Gandaki	Kawasoti	N/A		
Nagar Bikas Cricket Ground	Gandaki	Pokhara	N/A		
Dang Cricket Ground	Lumbini	Ghorahi	N/A		
Shree Buddha Padma Rangashala	Lumbini	Taulihawa	N/A		
Sunwal Cricket Ground	Lumbini	Sunwal	N/A	Proposed expansion	
Chandanath Stadium	Karnali	Jumla	N/A		
Chaurjahari Regional Cricket Ground	Karnali	Chaurjahari	5,000		
Nakhira Cricket Ground	Karnali	Musikot	N/A		
Samtelichowk Playground	Sudurpashchim	Api Himal	N/A		
Baitadi Cricket Ground	Sudurpashchim	Dasarathchand	N/A		
APF Cricket Ground	Sudurpashchim	Attariya	N/A		
Seti Zone Police Ground	Sudurpashchim	Dhangadi	N/A		
Dhangadi Oval	Sudurpashchim	Dhangadi	N/A		
District Sports Development Committee Ground	Sudurpashchim	Bhimdatta	N/A		
Birendra Sainik Maha Vidyalaya Ground	Bagmati	Bhaktapur	5,000	Hosted 2010 ICC WCL Division Five	

== Proposed ==
Ground	City	District	Province	Capacity	Ref.
Kajini International Cricket Ground	Suryodaya	Ilam	Koshi	N/A	
Dhangadhi Cricket Ground	Dhangadhi	Kailali	Sudurpashchim	N/A	
Itahari Cricket Ground	Itahari	Sunsari	Koshi	15,000	
Sainamaina Cricket Ground also known as Lord Buddha International Cricket Stadium	Sainamaina	Rupandehi	Lumbini	60000	
1907 Arena Cricket Stadium also known as १९०७ एरेना क्रिकेट स्टेडियम	Arjunchaupari	Syangja	Gandaki	10000	
MBJ Cricket Ground	Biratnagar	Morang	Koshi	15000	
Sanfebagar Cricket Ground	Sanfebagar	Achham	Sudurpashchim	N/A	

=== Marylebone Jwala Cricket Ground ===
MBJ Cricket Ground (Nepali: मेरिलेबोन जावला क्रिकेट मैदान) is developed by Nepal Cricket Foundation through financial support of Marylebone Cricket Club Foundation, London, UK. Foundation is based at Lords, UK. The capacity of the stadium is around 15,000. It is the home ground of Biratnagar Kings in Nepal Premier League.

=== Dang International Cricket Stadium ===
Dang International Cricket Stadium (Nepali: दाङ अन्तर्राष्ट्रिय क्रीकेट मैदान), also known as Ghorahi Int'l Cricket Ground, is a proposed Int'l Cricket Stadium. It is located at 28°01′17″N, 82°28′13″E (or 28.0213° N, 82.4703° E in decimal degrees) in Dang Valley, Ghorahi, Dang. This stadium will be one of the biggest cricket stadium in Nepal. The capacity of the stadium will have over 30,000 spectators. This stadium is also the home ground of Lumbini Province cricket team and Lumbini Province women's cricket team & Lumbini all star.

Ghorahi Cricket Ground has been hosting under-16 and under-19 provincial-level tournaments. It has also hosted the Dang Cricket League twice and the Sagarmatha T20 League one time. The Ghorahi Cricket Stadium in Ghorahi Sub-Metropolitan City does not have as much infrastructure as the stadium in Lamahi, but Ghorahi has a good ground capable of hosting big national tournaments.

=== Inaruwa Cricket Stadium ===
- Location: Inaruwa, Sunsari District
- Also Known As: Jail Field
- Proximity: Near Inaruwa District Hospital
- Events: Hosted Manmohan Memorial Cup (ODI format) and Mayor Cup (T20 format)
- Features: Eight floodlights for night matches

== International games hosted ==
Total Matches Held	Ground Name	City	First Game
194	Tribhuvan University International Cricket Ground	Kirtipur	2019
56	Mulpani International Cricket Ground	Kageshwari-Manohara	2023
8	Pokhara International Cricket Stadium	Pokhara	2019
0	Mulpani Cricket Stadium	Kageshwari-Manohara	To be played in 2026

- Total matches held refers to the combined number of ODI and T20I matches held at one ground.

== See also ==
- Cricket in Nepal
- Cricket Association of Nepal
- Nepal national cricket team
- List of cricket grounds by capacity
