= 1907 Arena Cricket Stadium =

Cricket stadium in Syangja , Nepal

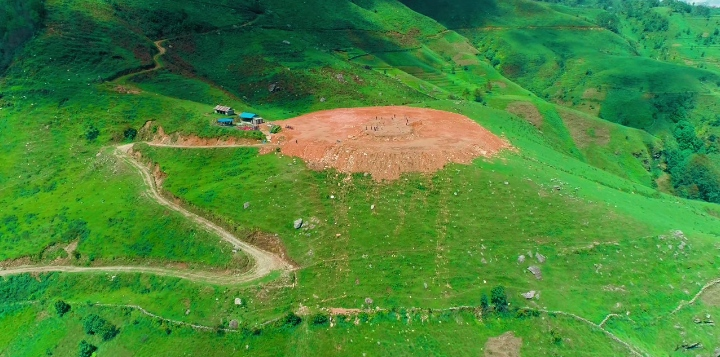
- Site of proposed stadium
- Location: Aruchaur, Syangja, Gandaki Province, Nepal
- Capacity: 10,000
- Type: Cricket stadium
- Surface: Grass pitch

Construction
- Opened: Projected for 2026

1907 Arena Cricket Stadium is a cricket stadium in Aruchaur, Syangja District, Gandaki Province, Nepal, being built in honor of Nepali cricketer Sandeep Lamichhane. The stadium is planned to serve as a venue for both domestic and international cricket events. Its site is at an altitude of 1,907 metres (6,257 ft) above sea level, from which its name is derived. The stadium is planned to have a capacity of 10,000 spectators, with a grass pitch, locker rooms and media areas. It will serve as a training ground and venue for domestic and international matches. Groundbreaking for the stadium was held in 2024, and it is expected to open in 2026. The stadium is being funded by the Arjunchaupari Rural Municipality, and local contributions.

== See also ==
- Cricket in Nepal
- Cricket Association of Nepal
- Nepal national cricket team
- List of cricket grounds by capacity
- List of cricket grounds in Nepal
