= 2022 Kashmir Premier League (Pakistan) final =

Final of the 2022 Kashmir Premier League

2022 Kashmir Premier League Final
- Event: 2022 Kashmir Premier League
Mirpur Royals	Bagh Stallions
- Match Abandoned; Mirpur Royals declared winners.
- Date: 26 August 2022
- Venue: Muzaffarabad Cricket Stadium, Muzaffarabad
- Umpires: Aleem Dar; Rashid Riaz

The 2022 Kashmir Premier League Final was a 20-over cricket match scheduled to be played on 26 August 2022, at Muzaffarabad Cricket Stadium, Muzaffarabad between the Mirpur Royals and Bagh Stallions to determine the winner of the 2022 edition of the Kashmir Premier League. The match was abandoned due to rain and Mirpur were awarded the title due to their better position in the points table.

== Route to the final ==
During the group stage of the 2022 KPL each team played 6 matches, one against each of the other sides contesting the competition. All the matches took place in Muzaffarabad Cricket Stadium. The format for the group stages was single round-robin. This meant that all teams would face each other once. The teams needed to finish in the top 4 to qualify for the playoffs. Mirpur Royals finished 1st and Bagh Stallions finished 2nd in the group stages. Mirpur won four matches and lost two matches. Bagh won three matches, lost two matches and had one end in no result.

League progression
Team	Group matches						Playoffs		
Team	1	2	3	4	5	6	Q1/E	Q2	F
Bagh Stallions	0	2	3	5	5	7	L	W	L
Mirpur Royals	2	2	2	4	6	8	W		W

Win	Loss	No result

- Note: The total points at the end of each group match are listed.
- Note: Click on the points (group matches) or W/L (playoffs) to see the match summary.

=== Group stage match ===
The two teams played each other once in the group stage of the 2022 KPL. The match was held on 15 August in Muzaffarabad. Bagh batted first, scoring 189/5 in 20 overs. Mirpur scored 181/4 in 20 overs and this resulted in an 8 run victory for the Bagh Stallions.

15 August 2021 (D/N)
Scorecard

Bagh Stallions; 189/5 (20 overs)	v	Mirpur Royals; 181/4 (20 overs)

Bagh Stallions won by 8 runs
Muzaffarabad Cricket Stadium, Muzaffarabad

=== Playoff matches ===
Mirpur and Bagh met in the qualifier match due to their respective positions. The winner automatically qualified for the final of the KPL. The match took place in Muzaffarabad on 24 August 2022. The match was abandoned due to rain and Mirpur qualified for the final due to their better position in the points table. Bagh then had to play Overseas Warriors in Eliminator 2. Eliminator 1 was also abandoned due to rain and Overseas Warriors qualified for Eliminator 2 due to their better position in the points table. Eliminator 2 was abandoned due to rain and Bagh qualified for the final due to their better position in the points table.

==== Qualifier ====
24 August 2021
Scorecard

Mirpur Royals	v	Bagh Stallions

Match Abandoned
Muzaffarabad Cricket Stadium, Muzaffarabad

===== Eliminator 1 =====
24 August 2022 (D/N)
Scorecard

Overseas Warriors	v	Kotli Lions

Match Abandoned
Muzaffarabad Cricket Stadium, Muzaffarabad

===== Eliminator 2 =====
16 August 2021 (D/N)
Scorecard

Bagh Stallions	v	Overseas Warriors

Match Abandoned
Muzaffarabad Cricket Stadium, Muzaffarabad

== Match ==
The match was abandoned due to rain and the Mirpur Royals were declared the winners of the 2022 KPL due to their better position in the points table.

== Match Officials ==
On field Umpire: (Pakistan) Aleem Dar

On field Umpire: (Pakistan) Rashid Riaz

TV Umpire: (Pakistan) Faisal Afridi

Reserve Umpire: (Pakistan) Zameer Haider

Match Referee: (Pakistan) Muhammad Javed
