= Rajgir International Cricket Stadium =

Cricket stadium complex in Bihar, India

Rajgir International Stadium
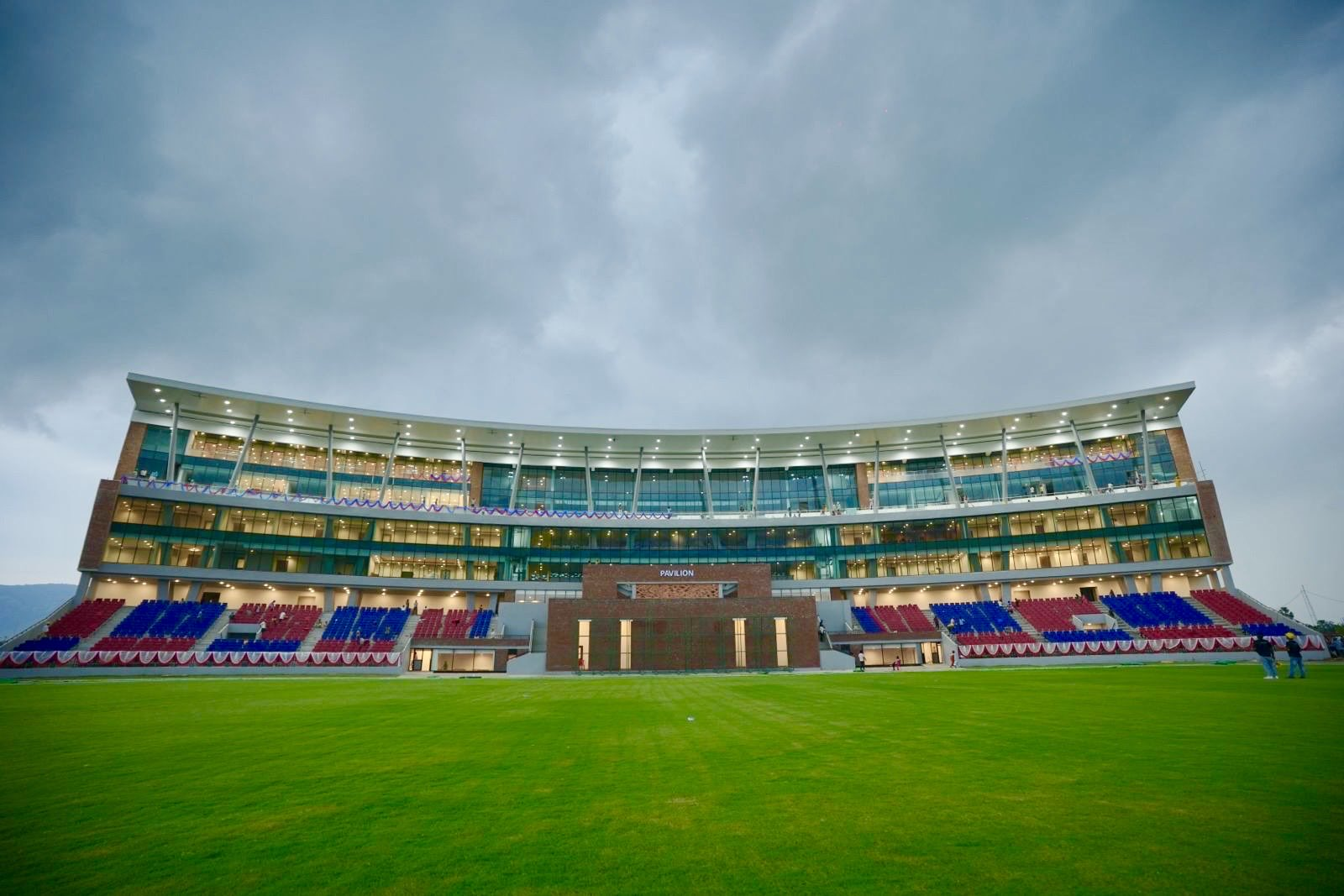
- Interactive map of Rajgir International Stadium

Ground information
- Location: Rajgir Sports Complex, Nalanda, Bihar
- Country: India
- Coordinates: 25.02094°N 85.36457°E
- Capacity: 45,000
- Architect: Shapoorji Pallonji Group

Team information
Bihar cricket team	(2026)

Rajgir International Cricket Stadium is part of Rajgir Sports Complex, Bihar. It is the home to Bihar cricket team. The total capacity of the stadium is 45,000. It was inaugurated on 5 October 2025, and is one of the Largest Cricket Stadiums in India.

== History ==
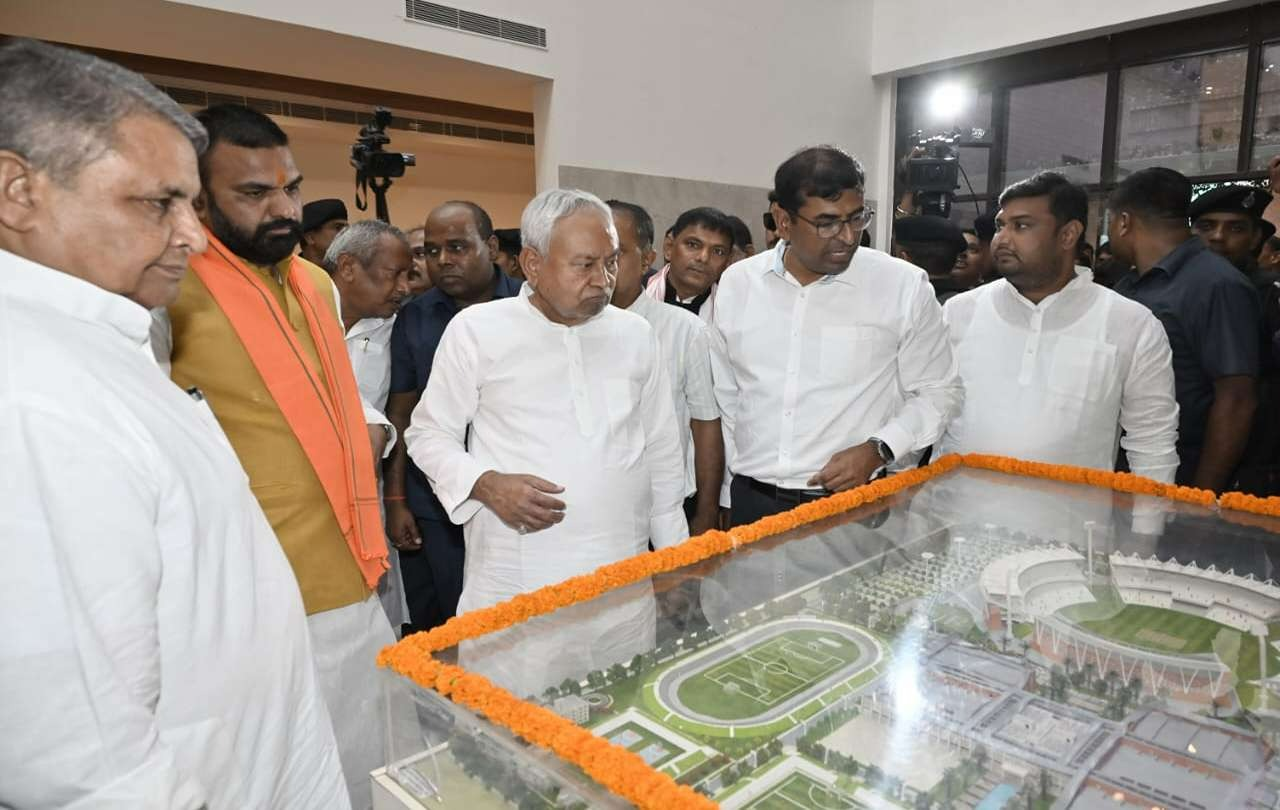
Bihar Chief Minister Nitish Kumar, Deputy Chief Minister Samrat Chaudhary and Minister Jayant Raj Kushwaha overseeing various construction works at Rajgir Sports Complex on 29 August 2024.

In 2018, it was announced by the Chief Minister of Bihar Nitish Kumar that an international cricket stadium will be constructed at Rajgir in Bihar's Nalanda district. On 12 October 2018, Nitish Kumar has laid the foundation stone of Rajgir international cricket stadium. The stadium will be the second stadium in Bihar that could host international matches after Moin-ul-Haq Stadium, and will be built on the model of Sydney Cricket Ground. The stadium will be built on 90 acres of land with an estimated cost of ₹633 Crore. It will serve as an international cricket stadium as well as a sports academy.

The construction should have been completed in 2022, but As of January 2023, only 40% of the works have been finished. As of June 2025, the main pavilion's framework is complete, and finishing work such as plastering, wiring, and putty is underway. The playing surface is nearly ready, with high-quality red soil from Maharashtra used for the main pitch and black soil from Mokama for seven auxiliary pitches; grass has already been laid on much of the field. A comprehensive drainage system is also being installed to prepare for the monsoon

== Design & Features ==
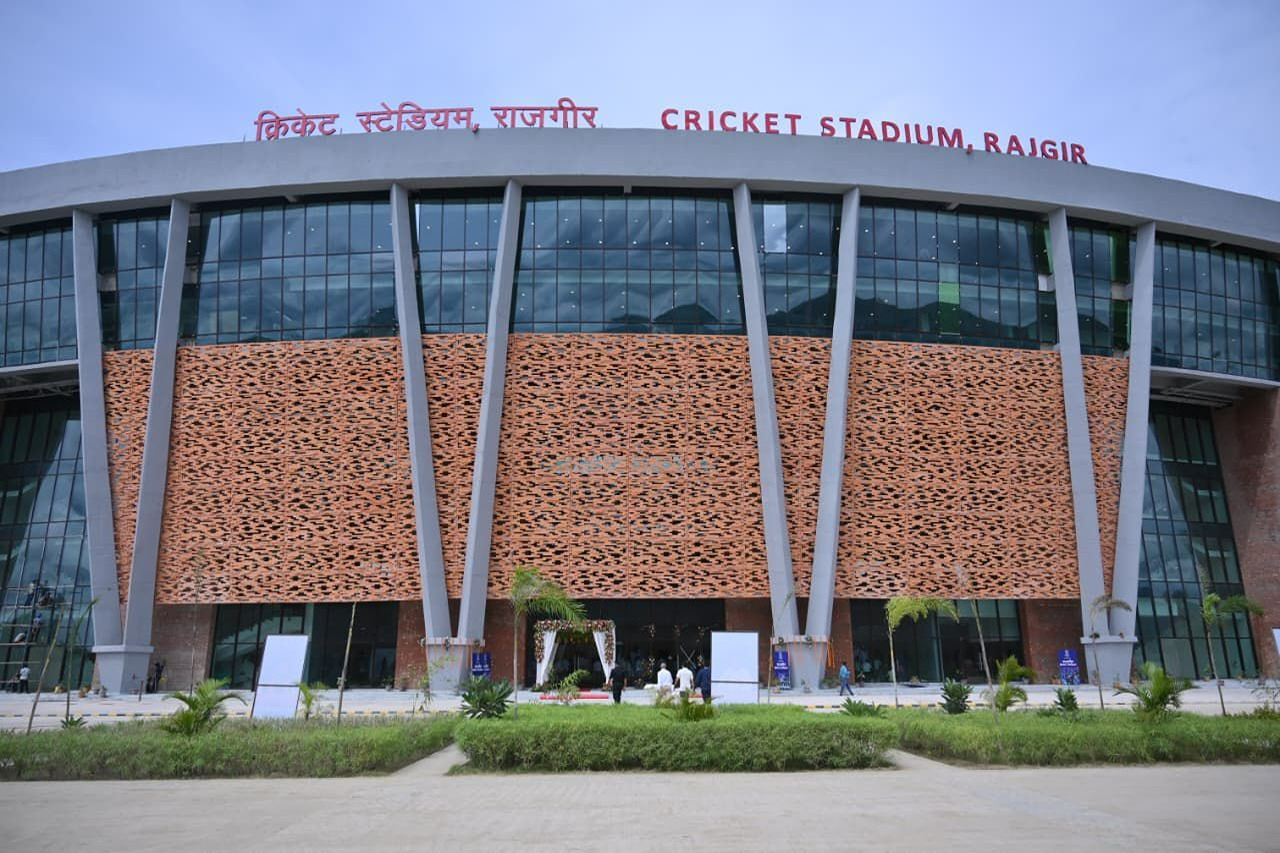
Rajgir cricket stadium

- The stadium is designed to seat approximately 45,000 spectators, making it among the largest in Bihar.
- The design draws inspiration from international venues such as the Sydney Cricket Ground.
- There will be multiple stands including East, West, and a Reverse Pavilion.
- For pitches, the main pitch is being constructed using red soil from Maharashtra, while auxiliary pitches use black soil from Mokama.
- The complex includes infrastructure such as floodlights, electronic scoreboards, drainage systems to manage monsoon rains, and standard facilities for players, media, officials, and VIPs.

== Domestic Cricket ==
Rajgir International Cricket Stadium is home to Bihar State Cricket team it has hosted Ranji Trophy matches. The first ever domestic cricket match held at the venue was the inaugural 2026-27 Ranji Trophy clash between Bihar and Uttar Pradesh held during 11-13 October 2026.

== See also ==
- Moin-ul-Haq Stadium
- Patna Golf Club
- Patliputra Sports Complex
- Saifai International Cricket Stadium
- Varanasi Cricket Stadium
