= Rajgir Sports Complex =

Sports Complex in Rajgir, Bihar

Coordinates: 25°09′24″N 85°36′57″E

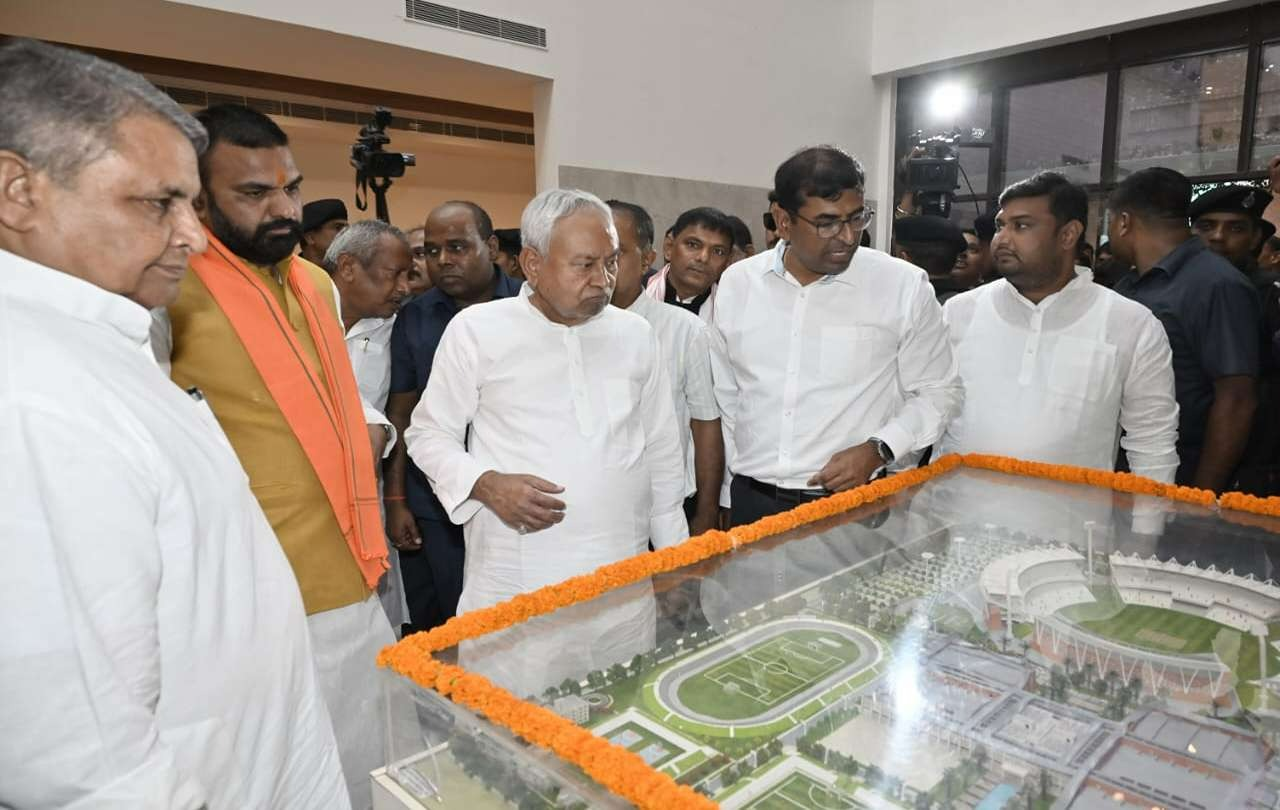
- Rajgir Sports Complex
- Interactive map of Rajgir Sports Complex
- Location: Rajgir, Bihar
- Owner: Bihar State Sports Authority
- Acreage: 97.9 acres (39.6 ha)

Construction
- Built: 2021
- Opened: 29 August 2024
- Builder: Shapoorji Pallonji Group

Rajgir Sports Complex in Rajgir, Bihar, is a sports facility. The complex was inaugurated on August 29, 2024, coinciding with National Sports Day. The complex is supported by the Bihar State Sports Authority (BSSA).

It has the facilities for 28 indoor and outdoor games including cricket with facilities like a research center, motivation center, sports library, swimming pool, cafeteria. This stadium also supports twenty-five games including cricket, hockey, football and swimming.

== Location ==
Situated in Nalanda district, about 100 km south of Patna, the complex spans approximately 90-97.9 acres. It was built at an estimated cost of ₹ 740-851 crore.

== Key facilities ==
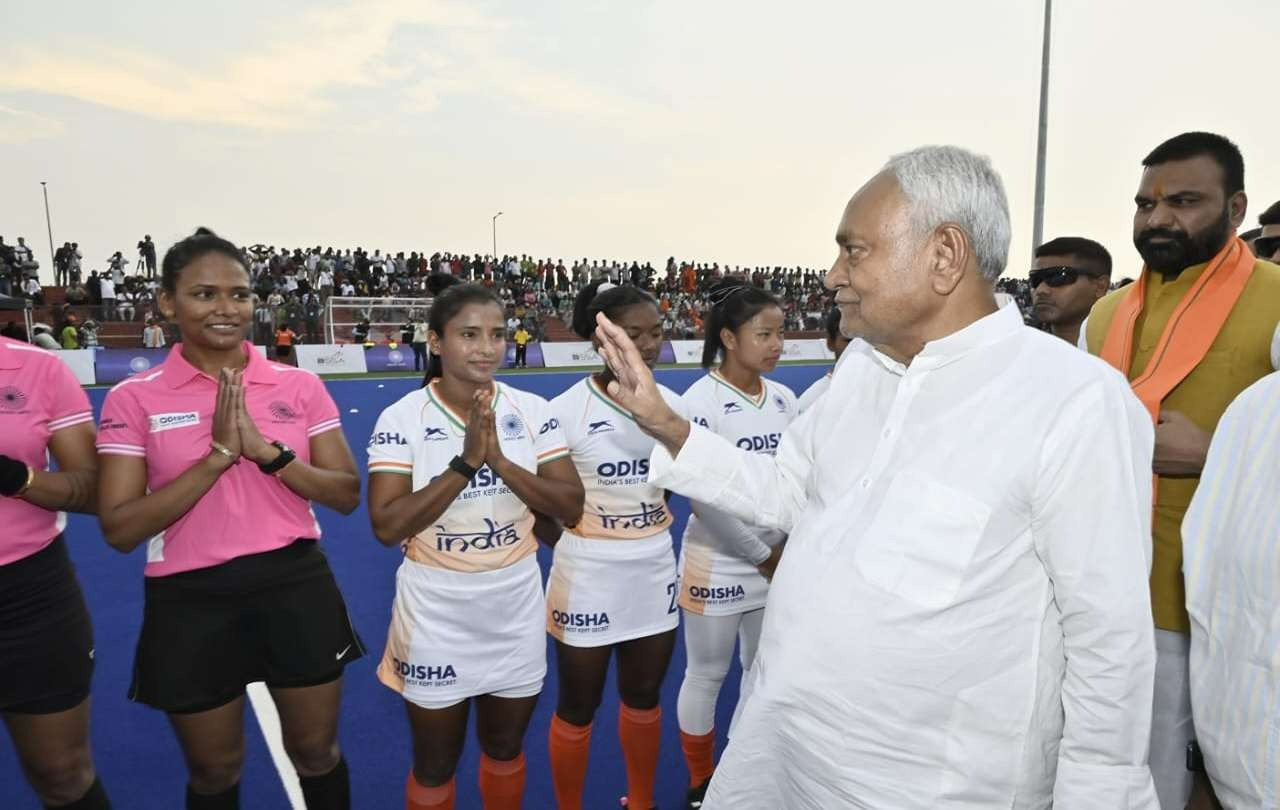
Former Chief Minister Nitish Kumar and the then Deputy Chief Minister Samrat Chaudhary meeting with sport persons at Rajgir Sports Complex and Cricket stadium on 29 August 2024.

- Rajgir International Cricket Stadium: Under construction, it will have a seating capacity of 40,000-50,000, making it Bihar’s largest and most modern stadium, modeled after the Sydney Cricket Ground. It will serve as the home for the Bihar cricket team and host international matches.
- Hockey Arena: The first completed facility, with Astroturf (same as used in Paris Olympics) and seating for 8,000-10,000 spectators. It hosted the 2024 Women's Asian Champions Trophy and 2025 Men's Hockey Asia Cup.
- Multi-Sport Facilities: The complex supports 23-25 sports, including hockey, football, kabaddi, volleyball, wrestling, athletics, swimming, weightlifting, table tennis, basketball, and handball.
- Additional Amenities: Includes a sports research center, motivation center, sports library, swimming pool, cafeteria, food court, and an Art & Culture Handicraft Exhibition Gallery showcasing Bihar’s traditional crafts.
- Design: The hockey arena features murals depicting ancient Nalanda’s legacy as a learning hub.

== Bihar Sports University ==
Co-located within the complex, inaugurated on August 29, 2024, by Chief Minister Nitish Kumar. It focuses on sports science, psychology, nutrition, and coaching.

== Events ==
It hosted the 2024 Women's Asian Champions Trophy, marking its debut as an international venue. It also hosted the Asia Rugby Under-20 Championship 2025.

== Photo gallery ==
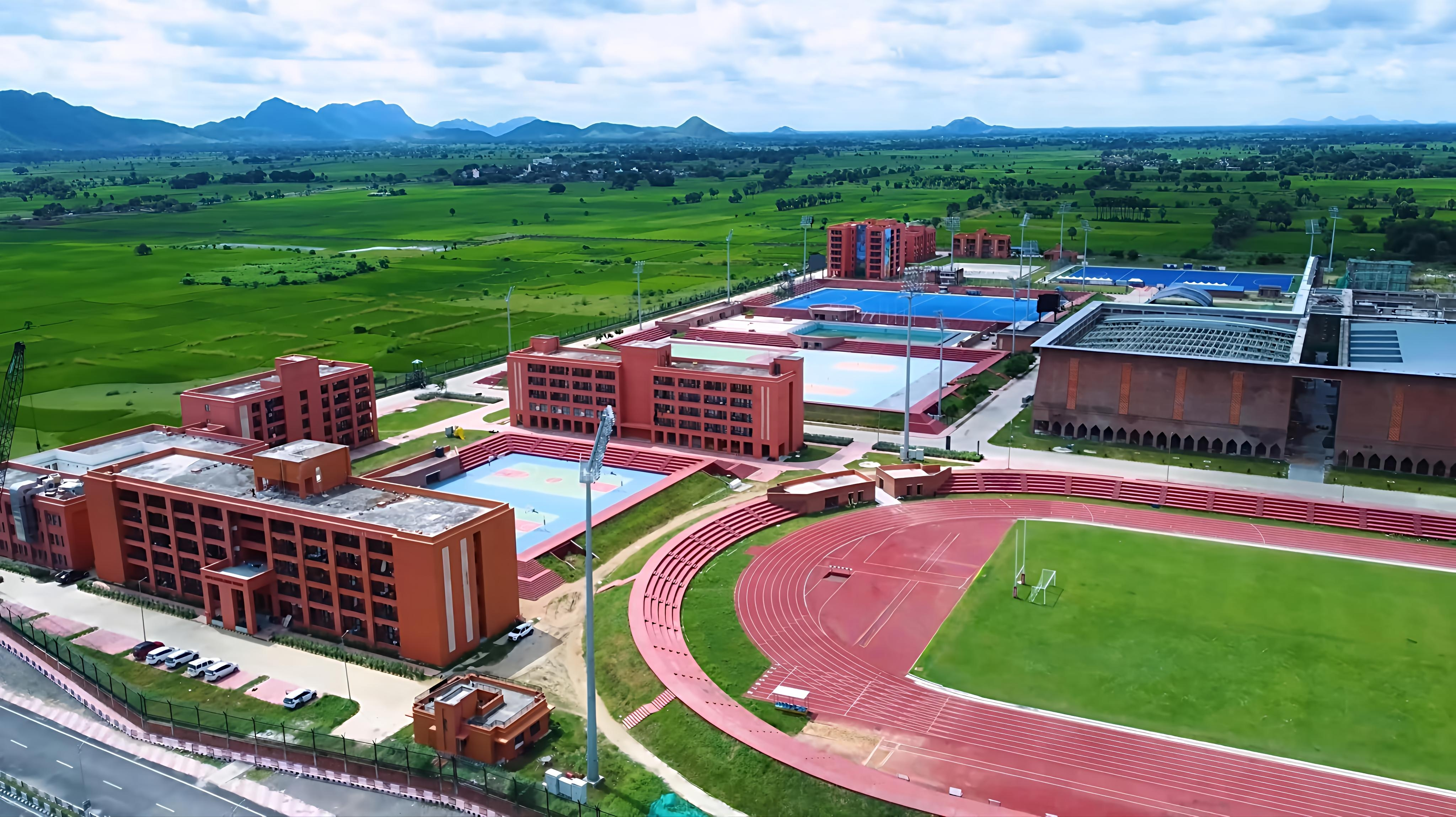
Rajgir Sports Complex

== See also ==
- Sardar Vallabhbhai Patel Sports Enclave
- Kalinga Stadium
- Patliputra Sports Complex
