= Karnali Province cricket team =

Nepali provincial cricket team

Karnali Province
- Nickname: KP

Personnel
- Captain: Diwan Pun
- Coach: Vaccant
- Owner: Karnali Province Cricket Association

Team information
- City: Surkhet
- Colours: Red
- Established: 2020
- Home ground: Kalinchowk Cricket Ground
- Capacity: 25,000

History
- No. of titles: 0
- PM Cup wins: 0
- Jay Trophy wins: 0
- Official website: cricketnepal.org.np

Karnali Province Cricket team is a Nepali professional cricket team, based in the Karnali Province, Nepal. The team competes in Prime Minister Cup and Jay Trophy.The team is currently being run under the Karnali Province Cricket Association.

== Stadium ==
Kalinchowk International Cricket Ground is a proposed international cricket ground of Nepal. This stadium will be home ground for Karnali Yaks of Nepal Premier League. The capacity of stadium will be around 25,000. This stadium will be one of the largest cricket ground of Nepal, Government of Nepal owns this stadium, and operats by Karnali Province cricket team.

=== Hosted events ===
International games: Cricket:

- 10th National Games of Nepal

== Current squad ==
As of 8 March 2025

Karnali Province Cricket Team Squad for 2025 Men's Prime Minister Cup
Name	Nationality	Birth date	Batting Style	Bowling Styles	NPL Team	Note
Batsmen
Himanshu Shahi	Nepal	27	Right-handed	—N/a	—N/a	—N/a
Rajesh Khadka	Nepal	22	Right-handed	—N/a	—N/a	—N/a
Nischal Rawal	Nepal	24	Right-handed	—N/a	—N/a	—N/a
Aditya Bikram Shah	Nepal	18	Right-handed	—N/a	—N/a	—N/a
All-rounders
Diwan Pun	Nepal	20	Right-handed	Slow left-arm orthodox	—N/a	Captain
Dipendra Rawat	Nepal	24	Right-handed	Right-arm off-break	Karnali Yaks	—N/a
Sunil Dhamala	Nepal	29	Right-handed	Right-arm Leg-break	—N/a	—N/a
Rabindara Shahi	Nepal	26	Right-handed	Right-arm Leg-break	—N/a	—N/a
Dinesh Adhikari	Nepal	21	Right-handed	Right-arm medium-fast	Lumbini Lions	—N/a
Wicket-keepers
Bipin Rawal	Nepal	22	Right-handed	—N/a	Chitwan Rhinos	—N/a
Arjun Gharti	Nepal	23	Right-handed	—N/a	Karnali Yaks	—N/a
Spin Bowlers
Unish Bikram Singh	Nepal	20	Right-handed	Right-arm off-break	Karnali Yaks	—N/a
Bipin Prasad Sharma	Nepal	17	Right-handed	Slow left-arm orthodox	Karnali Yaks	—N/a
Pace Bowlers
Prakash Jaishi	Nepal	22	Right-handed	Right-arm medium-fast	—N/a	—N/a
Anuj Chunara	Nepal	20	Right-handed	Right-arm medium-fast	—N/a	—N/a

== Coaching staff ==
- Head coach -
- Bowling Coac-
- Assistant coach-
- Manager -
- Under-19s Coach -
- Physio -
- Trainers -
