= Katahari =

- Village development committee
- Location in Nepal
- Coordinates: 26.47°N 87.32°E
- Country: Nepal
- Zone: Koshi Zone
- District: Morang District

Population (2011-06-22)
  - Total: 39,775
- Time zone: UTC+5:45 (Nepal Time)

Katahari is the village development committee (VDC) of the Morang District, located in the Kosi Zone of southeastern Nepal. According to the 2011 Nepal census, it had a population of 39,975 inhabitants.

== Geography ==
Katahari is located in southeast Nepal in the Kosi Zone near Biratnagar (बिराटनगर). It has an area of 51.6 km².
