= Sports Stadium, Berhampur =

Multi purpose stadium in Berhampur, Odisha, India

Sports Stadium
- Interactive map of Sports Stadium
- Full name: Sports Stadium
- Location: Berhampur, Odisha
- Coordinates: 19.310794°N 84.788685°E
- Owner: Berhampur Municipal Corporation
- Operator: Berhampur Municipal Corporation
- Capacity: 5,000

Construction
- Groundbreaking: 1993
- Opened: 1993

Website
- Cricinfo

Sports Stadium is a multi purpose stadium in Berhampur, Odisha. The ground is mainly used for organizing matches of football, cricket and other sports. The stadium has hosted three Ranji Trophy matches from 1993 when Odisha cricket team played against Tripura cricket team.

The stadium has hosted two List A matches in 1993 when Odisha cricket team played against Tripura cricket team and then Odisha cricket team played against Assam cricket team until 1998 but since then the stadium has hosted non-first-class matches.
