= Deukhuri International Cricket Stadium =

Cricket Ground in Nepal

- Lamahi Cricket Ground
- Interactive map of Deukhuri International Cricket Stadium

Ground information
- Location: Lamahi, Dang, Nepal
- Country: Nepal
- Coordinates: 27°52′27.9″N 82°30′57.7″E
- Establishment: 2018; 8 years ago
- Capacity: 35,000
- Owner: National_Sports_Council_(Nepal)
- Operator: Cricket Association of Nepal
- Tenants: Nepal national cricket team Nepal A cricket team Nepal national under-19 cricket team Lumbini Province cricket team
- End names
- N/A; N/A

International information

Team information
| Nepal cricket team |
| Lumbini Lions |
- As of 25 February 2025; Source: espn Cricinfo

Deukhuri International Cricket Stadium (Nepali: देउखुरी अन्तर्राष्ट्रिय क्रिकेट मैदान), also known as Lamahi Int'l Cricket Ground, is a proposed International Cricket Stadium. It is located in Deukhuri Valley lamahi, Dang. This stadium will be one of the biggest cricket stadium in Nepal. The capacity of the stadium will have over 35,000 spectators. It is the home ground of Lumbini Lions in Nepal Premier League. Additionally, this stadium is also the home ground of Lumbini Province cricket team and Lumbini Province women's cricket team.

It is strategically situated between two major cities of Western Nepal, Butwal and Nepalgunj, making it easily accessible from both cities. The stadium is a significant venue for cricket in Nepal and has hosted various national regional matches. The ground is currently being prepared for the 2025 Prime Minister's Cup Tournament, with efforts to enhance the pitch, seating arrangements, and other facilities. This development highlights the ground's importance in the nation's cricketing landscape.

Lamahi Cricket Ground is seen as one of the potential venues for hosting international cricket matches with the local authorities expediting the under-construction infrastructures which meet the required standards of International Cricket Council (ICC).

== Major events ==
- 8th National Games: Women Cricket
- PM Cup Women Tournament 2020 (2077 BS)
- 2025 Prime Minister Cup

== Records and stats ==
=== Matches hosted ===
| Format | ODI | T20I | WT20I | WODI |
|---|---|---|---|---|
| Matches | 0 | 0 | 0 | 0 |
As of 05 March 2025

== See also ==
- List of cricket grounds in Nepal
