= Varanasi Cricket Stadium =

Underconstruction International Cricket Stadium in Varanasi

Varanasi International Cricket Stadium
- Proposed 3D design of the stadium
- Interactive map of Varanasi International Cricket Stadium
- Location: Varanasi, Uttar Pradesh, India
- Coordinates: 25.2958°N 82.8549°E
- Capacity: 30,000
- Owner: Larsen and Toubro (for 30 years under Public–Private Partnership)
- Operator: Larsen and Toubro (for 30 years under Public–Private Partnership)
- Tenants: Kashi Rudras; Uttar Pradesh cricket team India national cricket team

Varanasi International Cricket Stadium is a currently in-construction cricket stadium in Varanasi, Uttar Pradesh, India. It was expected to be completed by May 2026 but is delayed now. The venue will have a seating capacity of 30,000 spectators which can be extended up to 40,000. Upon completion, it will be the fifth international cricket stadium in Uttar Pradesh after Green Park Stadium in Kanpur, Ekana Cricket Stadium in Lucknow, Greater Noida and Saifai International Cricket Stadium in Etawah.

== Overview and design ==
As the venue is located in the holy city of Varanasi, its architectural design will draw inspiration from Lord Shiva, featuring distinctive elements like trident-shaped floodlights, crescent-shaped roof covers, ghat-steps like seating arrangements, Bilva-patra (Wood apple leaves) shaped metallic sheets on the facade and the media center will be shaped like a Damaru.

The venue will have a capacity of 30,000 spectators which could be expandable up to 40,000. The venue will also have 9 practice wickets in the main ground, advanced drainage system, one outdoor ground, sufficient parking space, a VVIP or VIP zone on the second floor of the south pavilion

== Development ==
It was announced in April 2023 that Varanasi will get a International cricket stadium. In August 2023, Larsen and Toubro wins bid to construct the stadium. The Government of Uttar Pradesh acquired a 30 acres (12 ha) land beside Ring Road Phase-2 in the Rajatalab area at a cost of ₹121 crore (US$13 million) for the stadium, while the construction cost is estimated to be ₹330 crore (US$35 million).

On 23 September 2023, Prime Minister of India, Narendra Modi laid the foundation stone of the stadium in the presence of cricket veterans like Sachin Tendulkar, Sunil Gavaskar, Ravi Shastri and Dilip Vengsarkar, Chief Minister of Uttar Pradesh Yogi Adityanath, key officials of BCCI like Roger Binny, Rajeev Shukla, Jay Shah and many others. Base of stadium (Seating area), pavelian end (Damru) and triangular shaped (Trishul) Light pole is well implants and ground pitch work is also in progress, as expected rate of construction work is running still in progressive way. The stadium is expected to be completed before IPL 2027.

== Public transit ==
The venue will be well-connected to the city's airport, major railway stations and bus station. Transport system well connected to Lal Bahadur Shastri (LBS) Babatpur Airports. Well connected to ring road to Shivpur railway station. Connected with Varanasi-Prayagraj National Highway. Private and public transport available to reach the destination.
