= Muzaffarabad Cricket Stadium =

Cricket stadium in Pakistan

- Narol Cricket Stadium
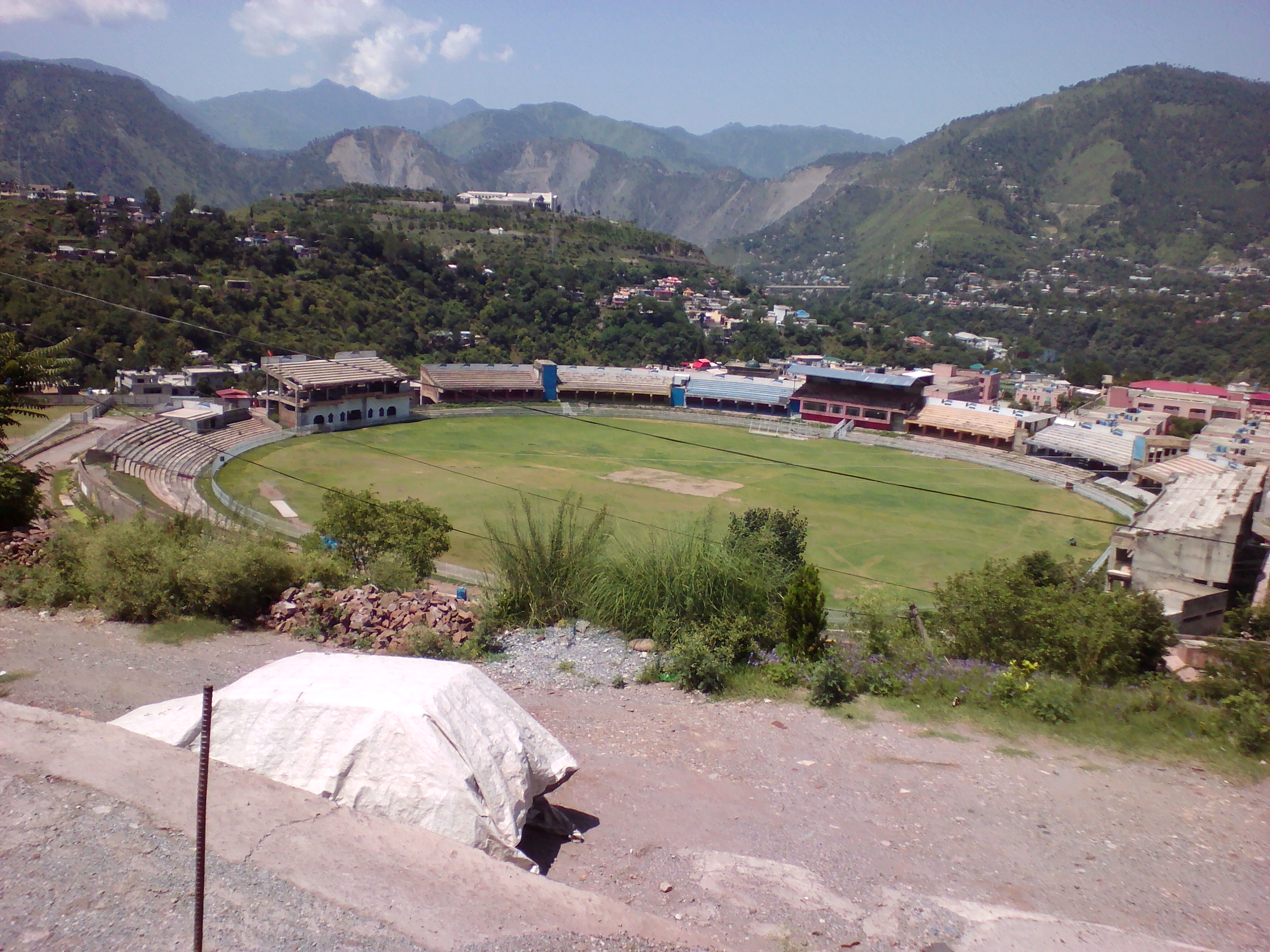
- Interactive map of Muzaffarabad Cricket Stadium
- Location: Muzaffarabad, Azad Kashmir, Pakistan
- Coordinates: 34.353498°N 73.478219°E
- Establishment: 2007; 18 years ago
- Capacity: 10,000 (as of 2021)
- Owner: Pakistan Cricket Board
- Operator: Pakistan national cricket team
- Tenants: AJK Cricket Team
- As of 2021; Source: ESPNCricinfo

The Muzaffarabad Cricket Stadium (a.k.a. Narol Cricket Stadium; Urdu: مظفر آباد کرکٹ اسٹیڈیم or MCS) is a cricket stadium in Muzaffarabad, Azad Kashmir. The stadium is situated near Azad Jammu Kashmir Medical College. It has hosted all the matches of the Kashmir Premier League so far.

Previously, the venue has been used as a hospital during earthquakes.

== Matches hosted ==
In 2013, the ground hosted five matches of the 2013 Inter-District Under-19 Tournament, and three matches of the 2013–14 Inter-District Senior Tournament. Two years later, it hosted five matches of the 2015 Inter-District Under-19 Tournament, and five matches of the 2015 Inter-District Senior Tournament.

In 2019, it hosted two fixtures of the 2019–20 PCB National Under-19s 3-Day Tournament, and one match of the 2019–20 Quaid-e-Azam Trophy (Grade II) 2019/20.

In 2021, it hosted all 19 matches of the first edition of the Kashmir Premier League. Around 2,500 spectators were allowed to watch the match in the stadium during the tournament due to COVID-19 pandemic in Pakistan.

In 2022, it hosted all 25 matches of the second KPL season.

== Gallery ==
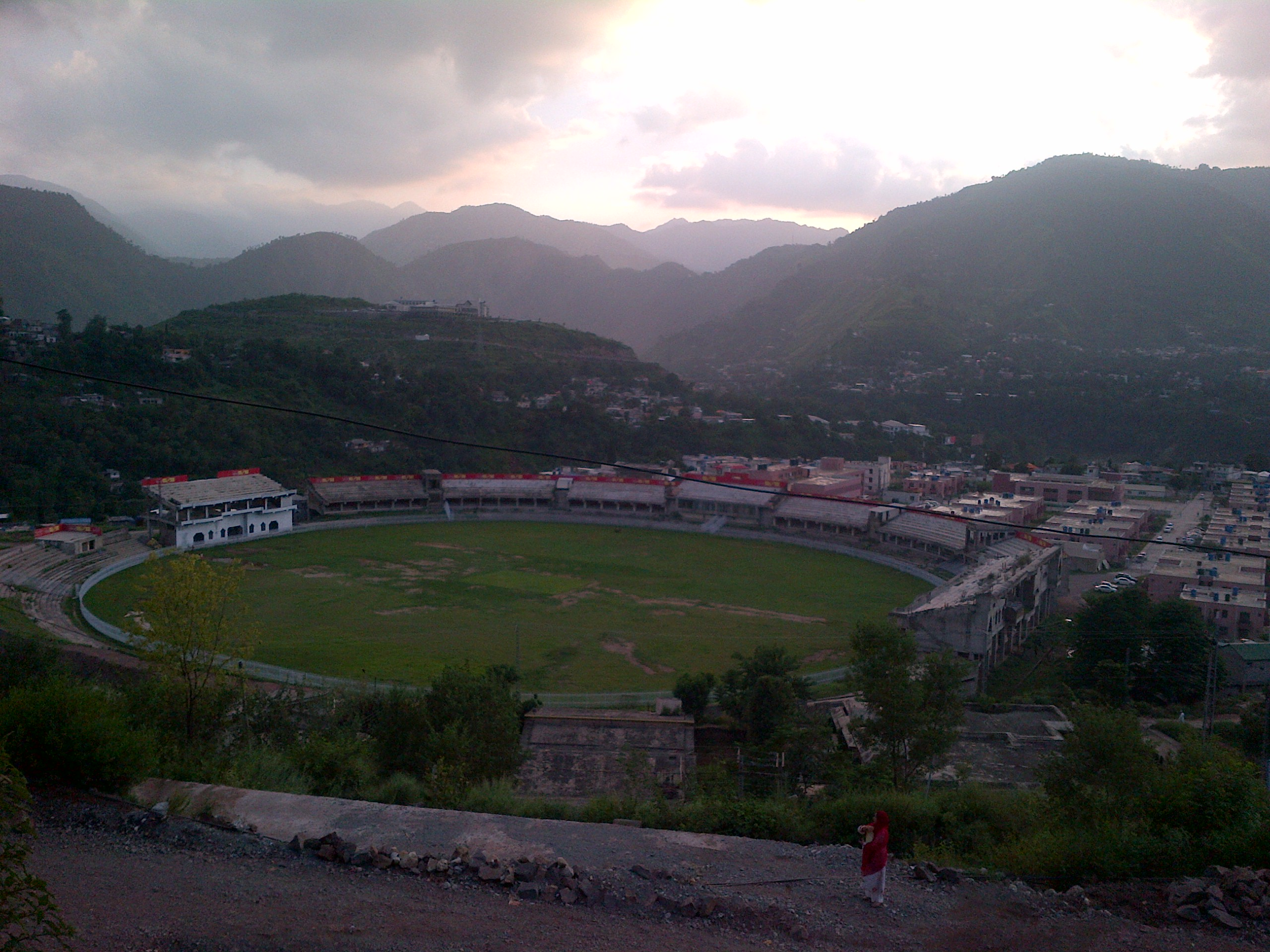
Aerial view of the Stadium

== See also ==
- Quaid-e-Azam Stadium
- Sardar Muhammad Hussain Sport's Complex, Bagh, Azad Kashmir
- Kashmir Premier League (Pakistan)
