= Extratech Oval =

Cricket ground in Lumbini, Nepal

- एक्स्ट्राटेक ओभल
- Interactive map of Extratech Oval

Ground information
- Location: Tilottama, Lumbini, Nepal
- Country: Nepal
- Coordinates: 27°34′33″N 83°31′37″E
- Establishment: 2024; 2 years ago
- Capacity: 25,000
- Owner: Binod Kunwar
- Operator: ExtraTech
- Website: extratechoval.com
- End names
- n/a n/a

International information
- As of 13 March 2024; Source: Cricinfo

The Extratech Oval (Nepali: एक्स्ट्राटेक ओभल), also known as ExtraTech Oval International Cricket Stadium, is a cricket ground in Tilottama, Lumbini, Nepal.

== Construction ==
This is the first private sector sports stadium in Nepal. The playable pitch of the stadium was completed in nine months. Binod Kunwar, who runs an IT company, ExtraTech in Sydney, Australia is the director and owner of this mega project.

The managing director of the stadium, Binod Kunwar said that 5 floodlights had been installed at a cost of about Rs. 70 million.

== Major sports events ==
- Legends League Cricket
- 2025 Prime Minister Cup

== See also ==
- Fapla International Cricket Ground
- Pokhara International Cricket Stadium
- Girija Prasad Koirala Cricket Stadium
- Gautam Buddha International Cricket Stadium
- Mulpani International Cricket Ground
- Tribhuvan University International Cricket Ground
- Mulpani Cricket Stadium
- Kalinchowk Cricket Ground
- Narayani Cricket Ground
- Shree Ram Janaki Cricket Stadium
- Deukhuri International Cricket Stadium
