= Lumbini Province cricket team =

Nepali domestic cricket team

Lumbini Province
- Nickname: LP

Personnel
- Captain: Dev Khanal
- Coach: Basant Shahi
- Chairman: Sanjay Gurung
- Owner: Lumbini Province Cricket Association

Team information
- Colours: Dark Red
- Established: 2020; 6 years ago
- Home ground: Siddhartha Cricket Stadium, Siddharthanagar
- Capacity: 20,000
- Secondary home ground(s): Extra Tech Oval Cricket Stadium, Tilottama
- Secondary ground capacity: 25,000

History
- No. of titles: 0
- PM Cup wins: 0
- Jay Trophy wins: 0
- Official website: cricketnepal.org.np

Lumbini Province Cricket team is a Nepali professional cricket team, based in the Lumbini Province, Nepal. The team competes in Prime Minister Cup and Jay Trophy. The team is currently being run under the Lumbini Province Cricket Association.

== Statistics and honours ==
- National T20 Championship
  - Winners (1): 2024

== Current squad ==
As of 8 March 2025

Lumbini Province Cricket Team Squad for 2025 Men's Prime Minister Cup
Name	Nationality	Birth date	Batting style	Bowling style	NPL Team	Notes
Batsmen
Dev Khanal	Nepal	21	Right handed	Right-arm offbreak	Chitwan Rhinos	Captain
Mrinal Gurung	Nepal				—N/a	—N/a
All-rounders
Krishna Karki	Nepal	34	Right handed	Right-arm medium fast	—N/a	—N/a
Biparshan KC	Nepal	19	Right handed	Right-arm offbreak	—N/a	—N/a
Salahuddin Khan	Nepal				—N/a	—N/a
Akash Tripathi	Nepal	21	Right-handed	Right-arm offbreak	Kathmandu Gorkhas	—N/a
Wicket-keepers
Prajjwol Thapa	Nepal	21	Right handed	—N/a	—N/a	—N/a
Samrat Bhusal	Nepal	21	Right handed	—N/a	—N/a	—N/a
Manish Thapa	Nepal	29	Right handed	—N/a	—N/a	—N/a
Spin bowlers
Nirmal Gurung	Nepal	20	Right handed	left-arm Slow orthodox	—N/a	—N/a
Ajay Chauhan	Nepal	23	Right handed	left-arm Slow orthodox	—N/a	—N/a
Ramesh Kurmi	Nepal	20	Right-handed	left-arm Slow orthodox	—N/a	—N/a
Pace bowlers
Bir Gharti	Nepal	21	Right handed	Right-arm medium fast	—N/a	—N/a
Nar Sarki	Nepal	20	Right handed	Right-arm medium fast	—N/a	—N/a
Sushant Thapa	Nepal		Right-handed		—N/a	—N/a

== Support staff ==
As of 18 March 2026

Position	Name
Team manager	Vijay Singh Gyawali
Assistant Coach	Ghanshyam Tharu
Head coach	Basant Shahi
