= Lamahi Municipality =

Lamahi Municipality लमही नगरपालिका
- Municipality
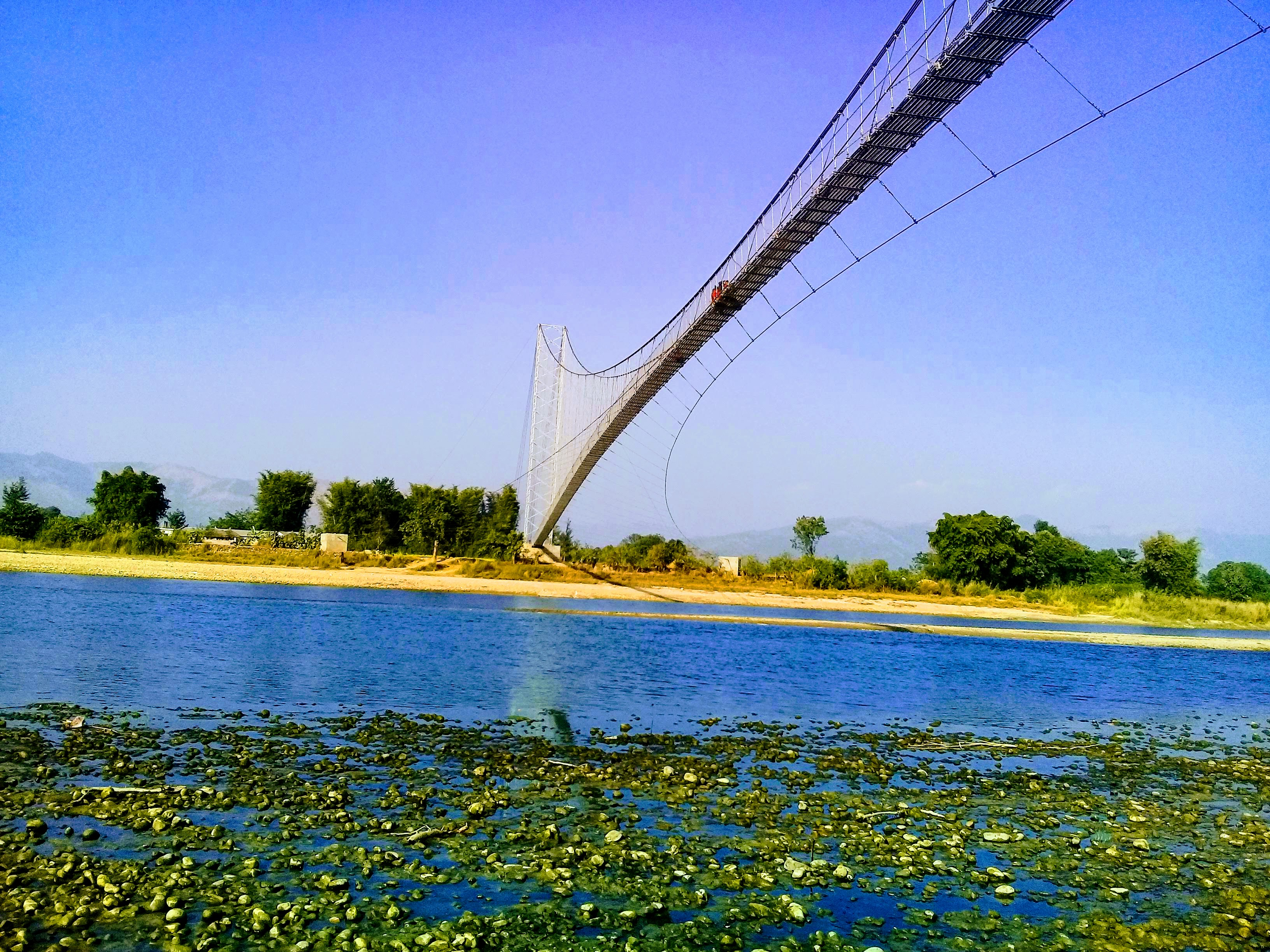

- Location in Lumbini Province Lamahi Municipality (Nepal)
- Coordinates: 27°52′12″N 82°33′16″E
- Country: Nepal
- Province: Lumbini Province
- District: Dang District
- Established: 2015

Government
  - Type: Mayor-Council

Population (2021)
  - Total: 59,050
- Time zone: UTC+05:45 (NST)

Lamahi Municipality is a municipality in Dang District of Lumbini Province, Nepal. It was created in 2015 as part of the conversion from the old zone/village development committee structure to the province/municipality structure. In 2021 (2078 BS) the municipality had a population of 59,050 with 13,458 households.

Lamahi Municipality combined the VDCs of Sonpur, Satbariya and Chailahi.

== Demographics ==
At the time of the 2078 Nepal census, Lamahi Municipality had a population of 59,050. Of these, 59.0% spoke Tharu, 37.6% Nepali, 0.9% Hindi, 0.9% Magar, 0.8% Awadhi, 0.3% Newar, 0.3% Urdu, 0.2% Maithili and 0.1% Kham as their first language.

In terms of ethnicity/caste, 59.9% were Tharu, 11.0% Chhetri, 9.3% Hill Brahmin, 6.3% Magar, 3.6% Kumal, 2.1% Kami, 1.1% Damai/Dholi, 1.1% Musalman, 1.1% Sanyasi/Dasnami, 0.9% Thakuri, 0.7% Newar, 0.5% Sarki, 0.4% Kathabaniyan, 0.4% Yadav, 0.3% other Dalit, 0.2% Kusunda, 0.1% Gurung, 0.1% Halwai, 0.1% Kalwar, 0.1% Majhi, 0.1% Rai, 0.1% Tamang, 0.1% other Terai and 0.2% others.

In terms of religion, 95.1% were Hindu, 2.6% Christian, 1.2% Buddhist and 1.1% Muslim.

In terms of literacy, 70.3% could read and write, 1.6% could only read and 27.9% could neither read nor write.

== Deukhuri International Cricket Stadium ==
Deukhuri International Cricket Stadium is proposed Int'l Cricket Stadium. It is located in lamahi, Dang. This stadium is also called as Lamahi Cricket Ground. This stadium will be one of the biggest cricket stadium in Nepal. The capacity of the stadium will be around 35,000 spectators.

== See also ==
- Deukhuri International Cricket Stadium
