= List of Lancashire County Cricket Club captains =

Lancashire County Cricket Club was founded in 1864. The club played its initial first-class match against Middlesex at Old Trafford on 20 to 22 July 1865. Lancashire is one of eighteen clubs that play in the County Championship at first-class level. The player appointed club captain leads the team in all fixtures, except if unavailable, and the following 36 cricketers have held the post since it was instituted in 1866.

== Club captains ==
- Edmund Rowley 1866–1879
- A. N. Hornby 1880–1893, 1897–1898
- Archie MacLaren 1894–1896, 1899–1907
- A. H. Hornby 1908–1914
- Myles Kenyon 1919–1922
- Jack Sharp 1923–1925
- Leonard Green 1926–1928
- Peter Eckersley 1929–1935
- Lionel Lister 1936–1939
- Jack Iddon 1946 (captain-elect, but killed in a road accident just before the season began)
- Jack Fallows 1946
- Ken Cranston 1947–1948
- Nigel Howard 1949–1953
- Cyril Washbrook 1954–1959
- Bob Barber 1960–1961
- Joe Blackledge 1962
- Ken Grieves 1963–1964
- Brian Statham 1965–1967
- Jack Bond 1968–1972
- David Lloyd 1973–1977
- Frank Hayes 1978–1980
- Clive Lloyd 1981–1983, 1986
- John Abrahams 1984–1985
- David Hughes 1987–1991
- Neil Fairbrother 1992–1993
- Mike Watkinson 1994–1997
- Wasim Akram 1998
- John Crawley 1999–2001
- Warren Hegg 2002–2004
- Mark Chilton 2005–2007
- Stuart Law 2008
- Glen Chapple 2009–2014
- Tom Smith 2015
- Steven Croft 2016–2017
- Liam Livingstone 2018
- Dane Vilas 2019–2022
- Keaton Jennings 2023

== Lancashire-born captains ==
20 Lancashire-born players have captained the club as follows:

- Bob Barber (born Manchester) 1960–1961
- Joe Blackledge (born Chorley) 1962
- Jack Bond (born Bolton) 1968–1972
- Ken Cranston (born Liverpool) 1947–1948
- Steven Croft (born Blackpool) 2015–2017
- Peter Eckersley (born Newton-le-Willows) 1929–1935
- Neil Fairbrother (born Warrington) 1992–1993
- Leonard Green (born Whalley) 1926–1928
- Frank Hayes (born Preston) 1978–1980
- A. N. Hornby (born Blackburn) 1880–1893, 1897–1898
- Warren Hegg (born Manchester) 2002–2004
- David Hughes (born Newton-le-Willows) 1987–1991
- Myles Kenyon (born Bury)1919–1922
- Lionel Lister (born Formby) 1936–1939
- David Lloyd (born Accrington) 1973–1977
- Archie MacLaren (born Manchester) 1894–1896, 1899–1907
- Edmund Rowley (born Manchester) 1866–1879
- Brian Statham (born Manchester) 1965–1967
- Cyril Washbrook (born Clitheroe) 1954–1959
- Mike Watkinson (born Westhoughton) 1994–1997
- Liam Livingstone (born Barrow-in-Furness) 2018

== See also ==
- List of Lancashire County Cricket Club players
