= List of Lancashire County Cricket Club records =

This is a list of Lancashire County Cricket Club records.

== Records ==
=== Scores ===
==== Highest Lancashire totals ====
| Score | Opposition | Venue | City | Year |
|---|---|---|---|---|
| 863 | Surrey | The Oval | London | 1990 |
| 801 | Somerset | County Ground | Taunton | 1895 |
| 781 | Warwickshire | Edgbaston | Birmingham | 2003 |
| 734-5d | Middlesex | Old Trafford | Manchester | 2003 |
| 698-5d | Glamorgan | Penrhyn Avenue | Colwyn Bay | 2015 |
| 686 | Essex | County Ground | Chelmsford | 1996 |
| 676-7d | Hampshire | Old Trafford | Manchester | 1911 |
| 655-6d | Essex | Old Trafford | Manchester | 2005 |
| 650-6d | Northants | Old Trafford | Manchester | 2014 |

==== Highest totals against each county ====
| Opposition | Score | Venue | City | Year |
|---|---|---|---|---|
| Derbyshire | 589 | Stanley Park | Blackpool | 1994 |
| Durham | 562 | Eastwood Gardens | Gateshead Fell | 1992 |
| Essex | 686 | County Ground | Chelmsford | 1996 |
| Glamorgan | 698-5d | Penrhyn Avenue | Colwyn Bay | 2015 |
| Gloucestershire | 474-3d | Aigburth | Liverpool | 1903 |
| Hampshire | 676-7d | Old Trafford | Manchester | 1911 |
| Kent | 639/9 | Stanley Park Blackpool | Blackpool | 2025 |
| Leicestershire | 590 | Grace Road | Leicester | 1899 |
| Middlesex | 734-5d | Old Trafford | Manchester | 2003 |
| Northamptonshire | 650-6d | Old Trafford | Manchester | 2014 |
| Nottinghamshire | 627 | Trent Bridge | Nottingham | 1905 |
| Somerset | 801 | County Ground | Taunton | 1895 |
| Surrey | 863 | The Oval | London | 1990 |
| Sussex | 640-8d | County Ground | Hove | 1937 |
| Warwickshire | 781 | Edgbaston | Birmingham | 2003 |
| Worcestershire | 592-4d | New Road | Worcester | 1929 |
| Yorkshire | 537 | Old Trafford | Manchester | 2005 |

==== Lowest Lancashire totals ====
| Score | Opposition | Venue | City | Year |
|---|---|---|---|---|
| 25 | Derbyshire | Old Trafford | Manchester | 1871 |
| 27 | Surrey | Old Trafford | Manchester | 1958 |
| 28 | Australians | Aigburth | Liverpool | 1896 |
| 30 | Yorkshire | Recreation Ground | Holbeck | 1868 |
| 33 | Northamptonshire | County Ground | Northampton | 1977 |
| 34 | Yorkshire | Recreation Ground | Holbeck | 1868 |

==== Lowest totals against Lancashire ====
| Score | Opposition | Venue | City | Year |
|---|---|---|---|---|
| 20 | Essex | County Ground | Chelmsford | 2013 |
| 22 | Glamorgan | Aigburth | Liverpool | 1924 |
| 24 | Sussex | Old Trafford | Manchester | 1890 |
| 26 | Glamorgan | Cardiff Arms Park | Cardiff | 1958 |
| 29 | Somerset | Old Trafford | Manchester | 1882 |
| 29 | Sussex | Aigburth | Liverpool | 1907 |
| 30 | Marylebone Cricket Club | Lord's Cricket Ground | London | 1886 |

=== Results ===
==== Tied matches ====
| Score | Opposition | Venue | City | Year |
|---|---|---|---|---|
| Tie | Surrey | The Oval | London | 1894 |
| Tie | England XI | Whitegate Park | Blackpool | 1905 |
| Tie | Hampshire | Dean Park | Bournemouth | 1947 |
| Tie | Essex | Old County Ground | Brentwood | 1952 |

Somerset County Ground Taunton 2018

==== Largest margin of innings victory ====
| Score | Opposition | Venue | City | Year |
|---|---|---|---|---|
| Inns & 455 runs | Hampshire | Old Trafford | Manchester | 1911 |
| Inns & 452 runs | Somerset | County Ground | Taunton | 1895 |
| Inns & 348 runs | Derbyshire | Park Road Ground | Buxton | 1975 |
| Inns & 330 runs | Kent | Angel Ground | Tonbridge | 1892 |
| Inns & 291 runs | Kent | Old Trafford | Manchester | 1895 |
| Inns & 273 runs | Leicestershire | Old Trafford | Manchester | 1912 |
| Inns & 271 runs | Middlesex | Old Trafford | Manchester | 1882 |
| Inns & 248 runs | Somerset | Old Trafford | Manchester | 1910 |

==== Largest margin of runs victory ====
| Score | Opposition | Venue | City | Year |
|---|---|---|---|---|
| 423 runs | Somerset | Aigburth | Liverpool | 1911 |
| 385 runs | Somerset | Aigburth | Liverpool | 1908 |
| 372 runs | Worcestershire | Amblecote | Stourbridge | 1911 |
| 370 runs | Oxford University | The University Parks | Oxford | 1985 |
| 361 runs | Middlesex | Old Trafford | Manchester | 1994 |
| 350 runs | Durham | Riverside Ground | Chester-le-Street | 1998 |
| 345 runs | Durham | Riverside Ground | Chester-le-Street | 1996 |
| 336 runs | Somerset | Stanley Park | Blackpool | 2002 |

==== Narrowest margin of runs victory ====
| Score | Opposition | Venue | City | Year |
|---|---|---|---|---|
| 1 run | Leicestershire | Aylestone Road | Leicester | 1906 |
| 1 run | Hampshire | Aigburth | Liverpool | 1920 |
| 2 runs | Leicestershire | Aylestone Road | Leicester | 1922 |
| 3 runs | Yorkshire | Fartown | Huddersfield | 1889 |
| 3 runs | Derbyshire | Park Road Ground | Buxton | 1947 |

==== Victory after following on ====
| Score | Opposition | Venue | City | Year |
|---|---|---|---|---|
| 60 runs | Surrey | The Oval | London | 1880 |
| 70 runs | Kent | Old Trafford | Manchester | 1883 |
| 117 runs | Oxford University | Aigburth | Liverpool | 1887 |
| 20 runs | Oxford University | Old Trafford | Manchester | 1888 |

==== Defeat after opponents followed on ====
| Score | Opposition | Venue | City | Year |
|---|---|---|---|---|
| 7 runs | Gloucestershire | Clifton College Close Ground | Bristol | 1884 |
| 73 runs | Middlesex | Lord's | London | 1890 |
| 65 runs | Sussex | Cricket Field Road Ground | Horsham | 1913 |
| 15 runs | Derbyshire | Park Road Ground | Buxton | 1976 |

=== Partnership record for each wicket ===
| Wicket | Score | Batting partners | Opposition | Venue | City | Year |
|---|---|---|---|---|---|---|
| 1st | 368 | Archie MacLaren & Reggie Spooner | Gloucestershire | Aigburth | Liverpool | 1903 |
| 2nd | 371 | Frank Watson & Ernest Tyldesley | Surrey | Old Trafford | Manchester | 1928 |
| 3rd | 501 | Alviro Petersen & Ashwell Prince | Glamorgan | Penrhyn Avenue | Colwyn Bay | 2015 |
| 4th | 358 | Stephen Titchard & Graham Lloyd | Essex | County Ground | Chelmsford | 1996 |
| 5th | 360 | Stuart Law & Carl Hooper | Warwickshire | Edgbaston | Birmingham | 2003 |
| 6th | 278 | Jack Iddon & Henry Butterworth | Sussex | Old Trafford | Manchester | 1932 |
| 7th | 248 | Graham Lloyd & Ian Austin | Yorkshire | Headingley | Leeds | 1997 |
| 8th | 187 | Luke Wood & Danny Lamb | Kent | St. Lawrence | Canterbury | 2021 |
| 9th | 212 | Chris Green & Tom Hartley | Gloucestershire | College Ground | Cheltenham | 2025 |
| 10th | 173 | Johnny Briggs & Dick Pilling | Surrey | Aigburth | Liverpool | 1885 |

=== Player records ===
==== Batting ====
| | Player | Information |
|---|---|---|
| Highest score | 1. Archie MacLaren; 2. Neil Fairbrother; 3. Eddie Paynter | 424 v Somerset at County Ground, Taunton in 1895; 366 v Surrey at County Ground, The Oval in 1990; 322 v Sussex at County Ground, Hove in 1937 |
| Most runs in season | 1. Johnny Tyldesley; 2. Eddie Paynter; 3. Charlie Hallows | 2,633 in 1901; 2,626 in 1937; 2,564 in 1928 |

==== Bowling ====
| | Player | Information |
|---|---|---|
| Best bowling (innings) | 1. William Hickton; 2. Johnny Briggs; 3. Bob Berry | 10–46 v Hampshire at Old Trafford, Manchester in 1870; 10–55 v Worcestershire at Old Trafford, Manchester in 1900; 10–102 v Worcestershire at Stanley Park, Blackpool in 1953 |
| Best bowling (match) | 1. Harry Dean; 2. Walter Brearley; 3. Harry Dean | 17–91 v Yorkshire at Aigburth, Liverpool in 1913; 17–137 v Somerset at Old Trafford, Manchester in 1905; 16–103 v Somerset at Recreation Ground, Bath in 1910 |
| Most wickets in season | 1. Ted McDonald; 2. Cecil Parkin; 3. Arthur Mold | 198 in 1925; 194 in 1924; 192 in 1895 |

==== Wicket-keeping ====
| | Player | Information |
|---|---|---|
| Most victims in innings | 1. Bill Farrimond; 2. Warren Hegg | 7 v Kent at Old Trafford, Manchester in 1930; 7 v Derbyshire at Queen's Park, Chesterfield in 1989 |
| Most victims in season | 1. George Duckworth; 2. Geoff Clayton | 97 in 1928; 92 in 1962 |

Most first-class runs for Lancashire
Qualification – 20000 runs

| Player | Runs |
|---|---|
| Ernest Tyldesley | 34222 |
| Johnny Tyldesley | 31949 |
| Cyril Washbrook | 27863 |
| Harry Makepeace | 25207 |
| Frank Watson | 22833 |
| Jack Sharp | 22015 |
| Jack Iddon | 21975 |
| Ken Grieves | 20802 |
| Charlie Hallows | 20142 |

Most first-class wickets for Lancashire
Qualification – 1000 wickets

| Player | Wickets |
|---|---|
| Brian Statham | 1816 |
| Johnny Briggs | 1696 |
| Arthur Mold | 1541 |
| Dick Tyldesley | 1449 |
| Alexander Watson | 1309 |
| Harry Dean | 1267 |
| Roy Tattersall | 1168 |
| Ted McDonald | 1053 |
| Ken Higgs | 1033 |
| Dick Pollard | 1015 |

=== Facts and feats ===
- Dick Barlow carried his bat for just 5* out of Lancashire's total of 69 in two and a half hours against Nottinghamshire on a treacherous, rain-affected Trent Bridge pitch in July 1882. Barlow and his longtime opening partner Hornby are the opening batsmen immortalised in the famous poem by Francis Thompson.
- Eddie Paynter scored 322 in five hours for Lancashire against Sussex CCC at Hove in 1937 having come down on the sleeper train from the victorious Old Trafford Test against New Zealand. He put on 268 in 155 minutes with Cyril Washbrook and celebrated his innings that evening at Brighton's Ice Palace.
- Lancashire County Cricket Club came runners-up in all four competitions in three seasons from 2004 to 2006 without winning one. In 2004, they came runners-up to Glamorgan in the Totesport League. In 2005, they came runners-up to Somerset in the Twenty20 Cup. In 2006, they came runners-up to Sussex in both the Liverpool Victoria County Championship and the Cheltenham and Gloucester Trophy.
