= Johnny Tyldesley =

English cricketer

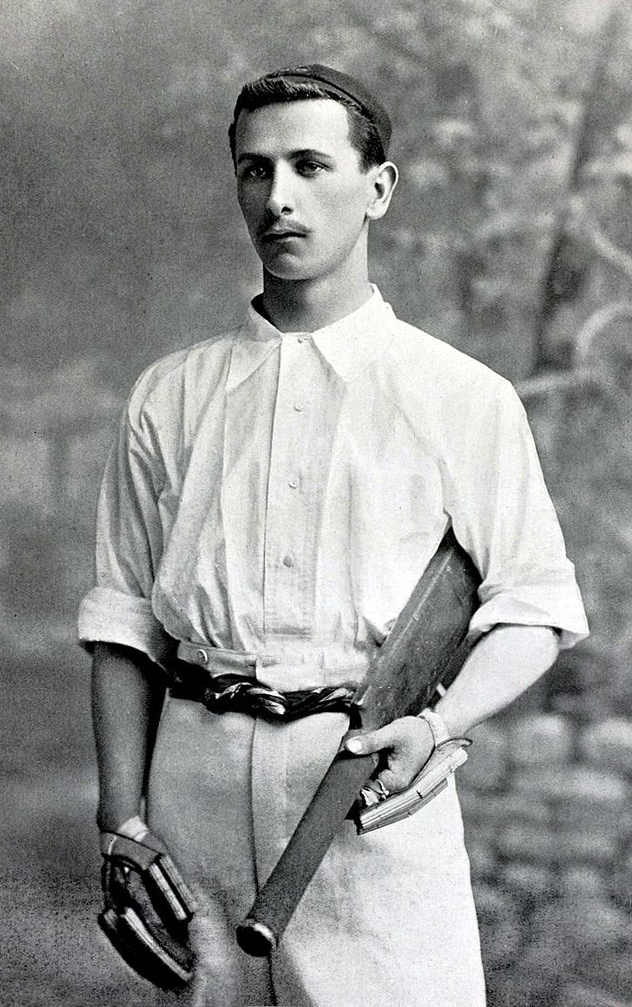
- Tyldesley in about 1895

Personal information
- Full name: John Thomas Tyldesley
- Born: 22 November 1873; Worsley, Lancashire, England
- Died: 27 November 1930 (aged 57); Monton, Eccles, Lancashire, England
- Height: 5 ft 7 in (1.70 m)
- Batting: Right-handed
- Role: Middle-order batsman
- Relatives: Ernest Tyldesley (brother)

International information
- National side: England
- Test debut (cap 117): 14 February 1899 v South Africa
- Last Test: 28 July 1909 v Australia

Domestic team information
- Years: Team
- 1895–1923: Lancashire

Career statistics
Competition	Test	First-class
Matches	31	608
Runs scored	1,661	37,897
Batting average	30.75	40.66
100s/50s	4/9	86/193
Top score	138	295*
Balls bowled	–	296
Wickets	–	3
Bowling average	–	70.33
5 wickets in innings	–	0
10 wickets in match	–	0
Best bowling	–	1/4
Catches/stumpings	16/–	376/–
- Source: CricketArchive, 27 October 2012

John Thomas Tyldesley (22 November 1873 – 27 November 1930) was an English cricketer who played first-class cricket for Lancashire and Test cricket for England. He was a specialist professional batsman, usually third in the batting order, who rarely bowled and generally fielded in outfield positions.

Born at Worsley, Lancashire, Tyldesley began his first-class career with Lancashire in 1895, and was a regular player until the First World War began in August 1914. Tyldesley was part of the Lancashire side when they won their first County Championship title in 1897. He played 31 Tests for England between 1899 and 1909, and was part of England teams who won the Ashes in 1903–04, and 1905. Tyldesley served in the British Army during the war, attaining the rank of corporal, and then recommenced his Lancashire career in 1919. He effectively retired from first-class cricket at the end of that season but did make one further appearance in 1923. Through the 1920s, Tyldesley ran a sports goods shop on Deansgate in Manchester. He played for Lancashire Second XI for some years until the end of the 1926 season when he concentrated on coaching, remaining with Lancashire and running his business until he died, aged 57, at his home in Monton, Eccles, Lancashire.

== Early years ==
Johnny Tyldesley was born at Roe Green, Worsley on 22 November 1873 and received his early training in Lancashire club cricket, described by Wisden Cricketers' Almanack as "a very stiff school". He played for the Worsley Cricket Club in 1892 and 1893 before joining the Lancashire Second XI in 1894. Wisden considered him "a well equipped batsman" when he made his first-class debut for Lancashire in 1895. Tyldesley was often formally referred to by his initials but was generally known as "Johnny" or as "John Tommy".

== First-class career ==
=== Lancashire : 1895 to 1898 ===
Tyldesley made his first-class debut, also his County Championship debut, on 22 July 1895, playing for Lancashire against Gloucestershire in a drawn match at Old Trafford. Batting in the middle order, he scored 13 and 33 not out. In his second match for Lancashire, Tyldesley scored 152 not out with 17 fours and 1 six against Warwickshire on a rain-affected pitch at Edgbaston, enabling Lancashire to win by an innings and 54 runs. He played in ten first-class matches in 1895 and 17 in 1896. His innings at Edgbaston remained his only century in that period, though he scored six half-centuries in 1896 with a top score of 68.

Having been runners-up five times in the previous six seasons, Lancashire won their first official County Championship title in 1897. Tyldesley began the season with a run of indifferent scores and did not make a half-century until his fourteenth match, starting on 1 July at Old Trafford, when he scored 54 and 53 against Essex. He followed up with three successive centuries, scoring 106 and 100 not out in the same match against Warwickshire at Edgbaston and then 174, his highest score to date, against Sussex at Old Trafford. After that, his form lapsed again and, apart from one innings of 68 against Somerset at Old Trafford, he made low scores only, including four ducks, in the remainder of the season. He generally batted at number five for Lancashire in 1897. His season tally was 1,017 runs in 26 matches at the average of 30.81. He scored three centuries, three half-centuries and held 13 catches. He surpassed 1,000 runs in a season for the first time, going on to achieve the feat in each of nineteen successive seasons.

Tyldesley scored 1,918 runs in 1898 including his first double-century. He was invited to join Lord Hawke's tour of South Africa the following winter.

=== England tour of South Africa : 1898–99 ===
Tyldesley played for England for the first time against South Africa in 1898–99. He hit a decisive 112 in one of the Tests.

=== Lancashire and England : 1899 to 1900 ===
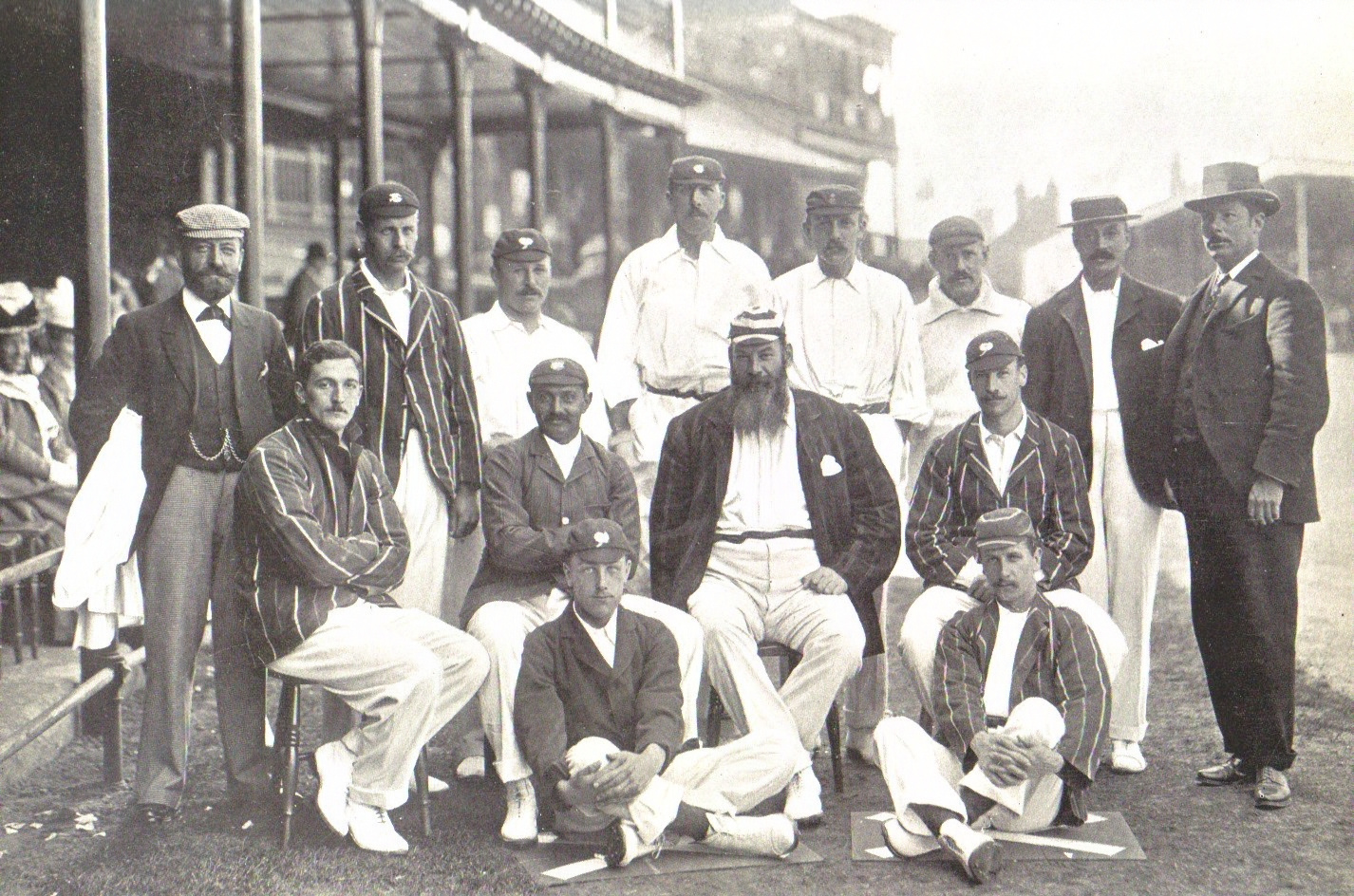
England team v. Australia, Trent Bridge 1899. Back row: Dick Barlow (umpire), Tom Hayward, George Hirst, Billy Gunn, J T Hearne (12th man), Bill Storer (wkt kpr), Bill Brockwell, V A Titchmarsh (umpire). Middle row: C B Fry, K S Ranjitsinhji, W G Grace (captain), Stanley Jackson. Front row: Wilfred Rhodes, Johnny Tyldesley.

In 1899, Tyldesley played his first Ashes Tests at Trent Bridge and Lord's. He failed in these matches, but by this time was established as a top-class batsman with a superb range of strokes and wonderful footwork that made him effective even on pitches where the ball had considerable spin it did after rain in those days.

=== 1901 season ===
In the 1901 season, Tyldesley scored 3,041 runs, finishing as the country's top run-scorer in the county championship. As a result, he was selected as one of the Wisden Cricketers of the Year in the 1902 edition. Wisden commented that he would have done even better but for the unpredictable state of the Old Trafford pitch in the early part of the season.

=== England tour of Australia : 1901–02 ===
Tyldesley was not at his Lancashire best but still had a highscore of 66 in the second Test.

=== Lancashire and England: 1902 to 1903 ===
In the 1902 Ashes J.T. Tyldesley scored 245 runs including a "superb" 138 in four and a half hours at Edgbaston was critical in placing England in a winning position. Almost twenty years later, Jessop remarked on the accuracy of his cutting.

=== England tour of Australia : 1903–04 ===
Tyldesley toured Australia in 1903–04 and, despite again not making a Test hundred, he played an outstanding innings on a "sticky wicket" in the second Test at the Melbourne Cricket Ground. He was dismissed for 97 in England's first innings when they totalled 315 over the first two days of the match. Rain caused the pitch to deteriorate badly on the third day and Australia were all out for 122, of which Victor Trumper scored 74. England struggled to 74/5 at the close with Tyldesley 48 not out. On the morning of the fourth day, he reached 62 before being dismissed with the England score at 90/8. England were all out for 103 and then dismissed Australia for 111 to win the match by 185 runs. England's captain Pelham Warner said of Tyldesley's 62 that "surely a better innings has never been played on a bad wicket".

=== Lancashire and England : 1904 to 1910 ===
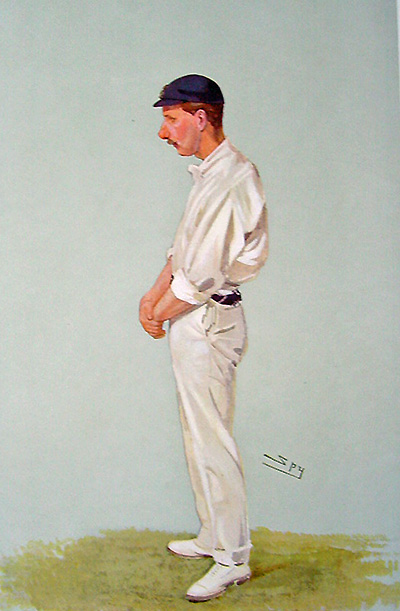
"Forty-six centuries in eleven years." Johnny Tyldesley as caricatured by "Spy" (Leslie Ward) in Vanity Fair, August 1906.

For the rest of the 1900s Tyldesley was, despite the emergence of Hobbs always in the forefront of English professional batting and seldom failed to be near the top of the batting averages. In 1904 he scored 2,237 runs with an average of 69.90, helping Lancashire to their 2nd county Championship title. In the wet summer of 1910 he returned to the top of the batting stats with 1,961 runs and an average of 49.02.

Though the 1905 Ashes series was his most successful with two centuries, from the following year Tyldesley gradually dropped out of the representative scene, playing his last Test in 1909. However, in 1906 against that year County Champions, Kent, Tyldesley made his highest score of 295 not out and would certainly have made a triple hundred had he not ran out of partners. With Reggie Spooner rarely available owing to business calls between 1907 and 1910, and Archie MacLaren declining, Lancashire were much too dependent upon Tyldesley to make a respectable score and he played superbly especially when one considers the fire in Old Trafford pitches in fine weather at that time.

=== Lancashire : 1911 to 1919 ===
For Lancashire he remained a potent force right up to the outbreak of World War I and, in 1919, he made 272 against Derbyshire.

Tyldesley served in the British Army during the war and attained the rank of corporal.

== Style and technique ==
According to Neville Cardus, Tyldesley was one of the greatest of Lancashire batsmen. Cardus agreed with Wisden that Tyldesley was exceptionally quick on his feet and therefore always seemed to have plenty of time in which to play his strokes. Tyldesley was very strong, despite his small size, with quick reflexes and great flexibility in his wrists which assisted both his strokeplay and, when fielding, his throwing. He was especially noted as a batsman for his mastery of the square cut and his fighting qualities in difficult conditions; he played many noted innings on bad wickets.

Tyldesley was an outstanding fielder who specialised in deep positions, mostly at third man or deep long on, and was noted for his speed and ability to quickly gather and accurately return the ball. A. A. Thomson gave the view that Tyldesley and David Denton were the two best outfielders in England.

Lancashire won the Championship twice (1897 and 1904) during Tyldesley's playing career. He also holds the record of most runs in a season for Lancashire with 2,633 achieved in 1901, and is 2nd on total runs scored for Lancashire with 31,949 – his younger brother Ernest Tyldesley has the record with 34,222.

There is an oil painting by Albert Chevallier Tayler titled Kent vs Lancashire at Canterbury of a match at the St Lawrence Ground, Canterbury in August 1906, the season in which Kent won their first official County Championship title. The painting shows Colin Blythe, the pavilion behind him, bowling to Tyldesley who has his back to the artist. Tyldesley is depicted as very still, even though delivery is imminent, with an orthodox stance. Kent won the match by an innings and 195 runs, Tyldesley scoring 19 and 4.

== Coaching ==
At the end of the 1919 season, Tyldesley retired to concentrate on his business but also took a coaching post with Lancashire. He played one match as Lancashire's first professional captain in 1923 but by then his health was declining.Lancashire won the County Championship twice (1897 and 1904) during Tyldesley's playing career, As cricket coach he played a major role in Lancashire's County Championship successes in the late 1920s. While he was coaching, they won the title four times in five seasons from 1926 to 1930, finishing second in 1929. In all he was part of the first 6 County Championship titles 1897, 1904, (as player) 1926, 1927, 1928, 1930 (as coach).

== Family and business ==
A. A. Thomson described Tyldesley as a "skilled, intelligent, well-mannered artisan" who was kindly, studious and without malice. On long journeys, while his colleagues played cards, Tyldesley would read a book. He was a family man with wife Rachel Jane, son Arnold Clifford and daughters Edith Eleanor and Hilda Kathleen. Like some other cricket professionals including Jack Hobbs and Herbert Sutcliffe, Tyldesley went into the sports goods business and opened a shop on Deansgate in central Manchester which he ran through the 1920s. He had been granted a benefit match by Lancashire, against Yorkshire at Old Trafford in 1906, which realised a profit of £3,105.

Wisden recorded in Tyldesley's obituary that he had been in weak health for some years. He died at his home in Monton on the morning of 27 November 1930 after he collapsed whilst putting on his boots before going to work at his shop on Deansgate. He was buried at Worsley Parish Church, his wife and children eventually being laid to rest in the same grave.

His younger brother Ernest Tyldesley (1889–1962), who was a top-class batsman for Lancashire and played in 14 Tests for England, remains Lancashire's most prolific run-getter of all time – he himself is second. His great-great-nephew is the former Yorkshire and England captain turned Cricket Commentator Michael Vaughan.
