= Bob Barber (cricketer) =

English cricketer

Personal information
- Full name: Robert William Barber
- Born: 26 September 1935 (age 91); Withington, Manchester
- Batting: Left-handed
- Bowling: Leg-break

International information
- National side: England
- Test debut: 9 June 1960 v South Africa
- Last Test: 11 June 1968 v Australia

Career statistics
Competition	Test	First-class
Matches	28	386
Runs scored	1,495	17,631
Batting average	35.59	29.43
100s/50s	1/9	17/90
Top score	185	185
Balls bowled	3,426	31,798
Wickets	42	549
Bowling average	43.00	29.46
5 wickets in innings	0	12
10 wickets in match	0	0
Best bowling	4/132	7/35
Catches/stumpings	21/0	210/0
- Source: CricketArchive, 16 August 2022

Robert William "Bob" Barber (born 26 September 1935) is a former English cricketer who played first-class cricket for Cambridge University, Lancashire and Warwickshire from 1954 to 1969. He also played 28 Test matches for England. He was named as one of the five Wisden Cricketers of the Year in 1967. An outstanding schoolboy cricketer at Ruthin School, Barber initially struggled to gain a place whilst at Cambridge after making his debut in 1955. Scoring 1000 runs for the first time in 1959, Barber was made captain of Lancashire.

Hampered by an intrusive committee and hostile crowd, Barber was perceived as not making the best of his own abilities, particularly as a leg spinner, though in a team boasting Test leg spinner Tommy Greenhough and useful allrounders in Grieves and Booth, both of whom were wrist spinners, Barber found it difficult to earn a place. He was replaced by Joe Blackledge in 1962, who met with no greater success as the county endured a difficult season. Joining Warwickshire, Barber was encouraged to play his shots and began to play regularly for England as an opening batsman. His greatest innings, and his only Test century, was made in the Third Test against Australia at the Sydney Cricket Ground in 1965–66. He made 185 off 255 balls and added 234 in even time with Geoff Boycott for the first wicket. It remains the highest score by an Englishman on the opening day of an Ashes Test. E.W. Swanton wrote:

Often in bleak moments do I cast back to Bob Barber's 185 in front of 40,000 on that sunny Friday in January '66. He batted without chance for five hours, starting decorously enough and then hitting the ball progressively harder and with a superb disdain to every corner of the field. One recalls the exceptional vigour of his driving and how he brought his wrists into the cut, making room for the stroke. It made blissful watching to English eyes – to one pair in particular, for by a wonderful chance father Barber had flown in from home that very day.

In 1969 he retired from county cricket although he appeared in the John Player League until 1971. Prominent in the early years of the Gillette Cup, he made little impression in the 40-over game. After retiring from cricket, Barber went into business and lives in Switzerland.
