= Jack Fallows =

English cricketer (1907–1974)

Personal information
- Full name: John Armstrong Fallows
- Born: 25 July 1907; Woodley, Cheshire, England
- Died: 20 January 1974 (aged 66); Macclesfield, Cheshire
- Batting: Right-handed

Domestic team information
- Years: Team
- 1946: Lancashire

Career statistics
Competition	First-class
Matches	25
Runs scored	171
Batting average	8.14
100s/50s	0/0
Top score	35
Catches/stumpings	10/0
- Source: Cricket Archive, 20 July 2014

John Armstrong Fallows (25 July 1907 – 20 January 1974) was a cricketer who played one season of first-class cricket when he captained Lancashire in 1946.

== Life and career ==
Jack Fallows was born in Cheshire and educated at Worksop College. A club cricketer and Minor Counties player for Cheshire before World War II, and a major during the war, he was asked to captain Lancashire in the first season after the war when the appointed captain, Jack Iddon, was killed in a motor accident just before the start of the season. Despite his inexperience and his negligible batting ability he was a popular captain who led the side to third position in the County Championship with 15 victories in 26 matches.

Wisden's report of the Lancashire season noted that "under J.A. Fallows the old stigmas of dullness and lack of imagination were overcome. Whatever his limitations as a batsman, the new captain proved shrewd in the field and inspiring everywhere. Willingness to go out for victory and keen finishes ensured maximum interest and enjoyment." In 2012, assessing the role of the amateur captain in county cricket, Colin Shindler praised Fallows as the archetypal amateur captain:

When only four fresh eggs were available one morning at a London hotel, he awarded them to the bowlers because Lancashire were likely to be fielding all day. His team respected and liked him, and he did exactly what an amateur should: he declared boldly to give the opposition a chance and his bowlers time to take their wickets. The crowds returned to Old Trafford, and the team were slightly unlucky to finish only third.

Despite his success, Fallows was replaced as county captain for 1947 by Ken Cranston. He served on the Somerset committee before returning to Lancashire, where he was elected to the committee in 1964. As chairman of the Cricket Subcommittee he helped the county overcome a period of failure to achieve success under the captaincy of Jack Bond in the late 1960s and 1970s.
