= 1901 County Championship =

English cricket tournament

- Cricket format: First-class cricket (3 days)
- Tournament format: League system
- Champions: Yorkshire (5th title)
- Participants: 15
- Matches: 164
- Most runs: Johnny Tyldesley (2,605 for Lancashire)
- Most wickets: Wilfred Rhodes (196 for Yorkshire)

The 1901 County Championship was the 12th officially organised running of the County Championship, and ran from 6 May to 4 September 1901. Yorkshire County Cricket Club won their fifth championship title, their second title in successive seasons. Middlesex finished in a distant second place.

== Table ==
- One point was awarded for a win, and one point was taken away for each loss. Final placings were decided by dividing the number of points earned by the number of completed matches (i.e. those that ended in a win or a loss), and multiplying by 100.

Team	Pld	W	L	D	A	Pts	Fin	%Fin
Yorkshire	28	20	1	6	1	19	21	90.48
Middlesex	18	6	2	10	0	4	8	50.00
Lancashire	28	11	5	12	0	6	16	37.50
Sussex	24	8	4	12	0	4	12	33.33
Warwickshire	16	7	4	5	0	3	11	27.27
Surrey	28	7	6	14	1	1	13	7.69
Hampshire	18	6	6	6	0	0	12	0.00
Kent	22	7	7	7	1	0	14	0.00
Nottinghamshire	20	5	6	8	1	-1	11	-9.09
Essex	22	4	5	12	1	–1	9	–11.11
Worcestershire	22	7	10	4	1	–3	17	–17.65
Leicestershire	20	4	10	5	1	–6	14	–42.86
Somerset	18	4	10	3	1	–6	14	–42.86
Gloucestershire	24	3	10	11	0	–7	13	–53.85
Derbyshire	20	0	13	7	0	–13	13	–100.00
Source: CricketArchive

== Records ==
Most runs
Aggregate	Average	Player	County
2,605	60.58	Johnny Tyldesley	Lancashire
2,382	74.43	C. B. Fry	Sussex
2,264	50.31	Bobby Abel	Surrey
2,067	76.55	K. S. Ranjitsinhji	Sussex
2,039	58.25	Tom Hayward	Surrey

Most wickets
Aggregate	Average	Player	County
196	13.59	Wilfred Rhodes	Yorkshire
135	16.75	George Hirst	Yorkshire
126	20.00	Fred Tate	Sussex
118	22.56	Frederick Roberts	Gloucestershire
115	23.25	Charlie Llewellyn	Hampshire
