= James Hallows =

English cricketer (1873–1910)

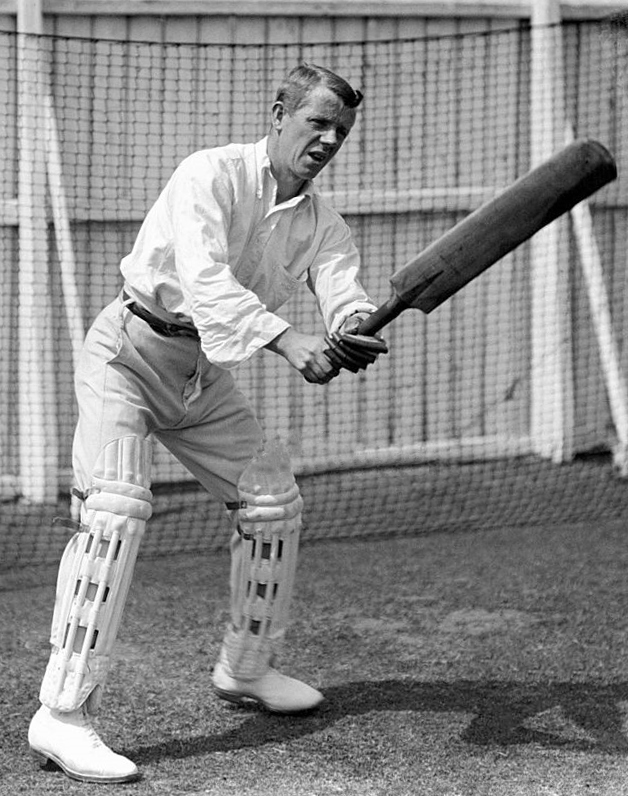

Personal information
- Full name: James Hallows
- Born: 14 November 1873; Little Lever, Lancashire, England
- Died: 20 May 1910 (aged 36); Farnworth, Lancashire, England
- Batting: Left-handed
- Bowling: Left-handed fast
- Role: All-rounder
- Relatives: Charles Hallows (nephew)

Domestic team information
- Years: Team
- 1898–1907: Lancashire
- FC debut: 9 May 1898 Lancashire v MCC
- Last FC: 29 May 1907 Lancashire v Essex

Career statistics
Competition	First-class
Matches	139
Runs scored	5,065
Batting average	28.77
100s/50s	8/23
Top score	137*
Balls bowled	16,694
Wickets	287
Bowling average	23.26
5 wickets in innings	14
10 wickets in match	5
Best bowling	9/37
Catches/stumpings	57/–
- Source: CricketArchive, 14 November 2008

James Hallows (14 November 1873 – 20 May 1910) was an English first-class cricketer, active from 1898 to 1907, who played for Lancashire. He was born at Little Lever, near Bolton and died at Farnworth.

Hallows was a left-handed middle-order batsman and a left-arm bowler who converted early in his career from fast-medium to medium pace. He played a few games for Lancashire from 1898, but played regularly in 1901 with 1,170 runs at an average of more than 31 runs per innings. He was less successful in the two following seasons, but in 1904, a season in which Lancashire were expected to struggle following the departure of Sydney Barnes, Hallows achieved the all-rounders "double" of 1,000 runs and 100 wickets. Lancashire won the County Championship and Hallows was named as one of the Wisden Cricketers of the Year in the 1905 edition of the almanack.

In the 1905 season, though his batting remained useful, his bowling fell away and he played only a handful of matches for the county in 1906 and 1907 as his health grew worse: he had epilepsy.

Hallows was the uncle of Charlie Hallows, the Lancashire and England opening batsman of the 1920s.
