= George Ubsdell =

English cricketer

Personal information
- Born: 4 April 1845; Southampton, Hampshire, England
- Died: 15 October 1905 (aged 60); Liverpool, Lancashire, England
- Height: 5 ft 6 in (1.68 m)
- Batting: Right-handed
- Bowling: Right-arm roundarm medium
- Role: Wicket-keeper

Domestic team information
- Years: Team
- 1864–1870: Hampshire

Career statistics
Competition	First-class
Matches	15
Runs scored	170
Batting average	6.80
100s/50s	–/–
Top score	29
Catches/stumpings	4/13
- Source: Cricinfo, 30 December 2009

George Ubsdell (4 April 1845 — 15 October 1905) was an English first-class cricketer and umpire.

Ubsdell was born at Southampton in April 1845. A professional cricketer, Ubsdell made his debut in first-class cricket for Hampshire against Sussex at Southampton in 1864, which was Hampshire County Cricket Club's inaugural match in first-class cricket. He played first-class cricket for Hampshire until 1870, making fifteen appearances. Playing as a wicket-keeper in the Hampshire side, he took four catches and made thirteen stumpings, an unusual statistic for a wicket-keeper in that they normally end their career with more catches than stumpings. In a match against Surrey in 1865, he made five stumpings in Surrey's second innings. As a batsman, he scored 170 runs at an average of 6.80, with a highest score of 29. Besides playing county cricket, Ubsdell was engaged as a club cricketer at Hampton Wick (1867 and 1869), Gore Court (1868 and 1870–71), Liverpool (1872), and Childwall (1874–76). He was additionally engaged in a coaching capacity by Marlborough College and Exeter College, Oxford. He was further described as a player by Haygarth in Scores and Biographies as "an excellent hitter to all parts of the field, especially to the off, bowls round-armed, middle-paced, and is also a capital wicket-keeper". Following the end of his first-class career, he spent 12 years as a groundsman at Liverpool Cricket Club's Aigburth Ground. Ubsdell later stood as an umpire in a first-class match between Liverpool and District and the touring Australians in 1882. Ubsdell died at the Palatine Hotel in Garston, Liverpool in October 1905.
