= Liverpool Cricket Club =

Cricket club in Liverpool

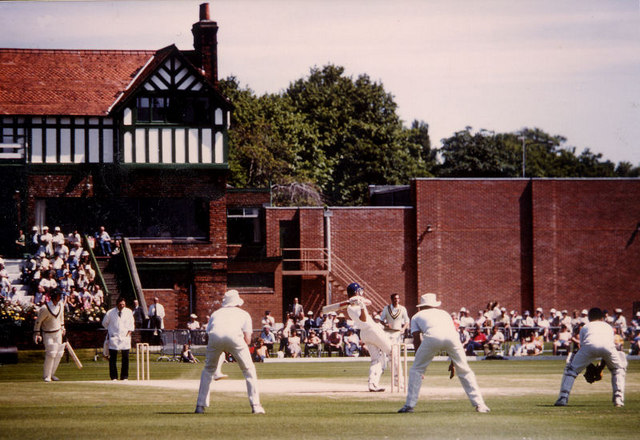
Liverpool Cricket Club

Liverpool Cricket Club is a cricket club in the city of Liverpool, England. The club has had four home grounds and since 1880 has been at Aigburth Cricket Ground.

The club was founded in 1807 and was under the control of the merchants and ship owners of Liverpool, many of whom had been slave traders. The early history of the club was heavily influenced by the slave owner and railway director Hardman Earle.

The club's most famous player is Ken Cranston, the former England Cricket Team captain. Noel Chavasse, a member, died in service during World War I, he was one of only three men to be awarded the Victoria Cross twice.

== Mosslake Field ground ==
Banastre Tarleton, veteran of the American Revolutionary War and Member of Parliament for Liverpool, is credited with introducing cricket to the city in the late 18th century. The first recorded game played in Liverpool was in the year 1800 on a ground known as Mosslake Field which was at Mount Pleasant. The players wore white trousers, linen shirts and a tall black hat known as a Billycock.

The club was formed in 1807 as the Mosslake Field Cricket Society. Membership cost 7 shillings and players were fined six pence for being late to matches. It is apparent from newspaper articles that other clubs existed in Liverpool at this time. The first game reported in a newspaper was written in the Leeds Intelligencer on 30 August 1812. The match between Liverpool and Rochdale concluded in a 42 run victory for the latter.

In 1822, the club was playing other teams such as Chester and Brunswick. The club was under the control of the merchants and ship owners of Liverpool, many of whom had been slave traders or were current owners of slaves in British overseas colonies. In the same year, the members rewrote the rules to ensure they kept control of the club. The members went on to forge close trading links with the city of Manchester, using cricket as a vehicle to do so. When Manchester Cricket Club was formed, Liverpool quickly set up a match.

== Tunnel Road ground ==
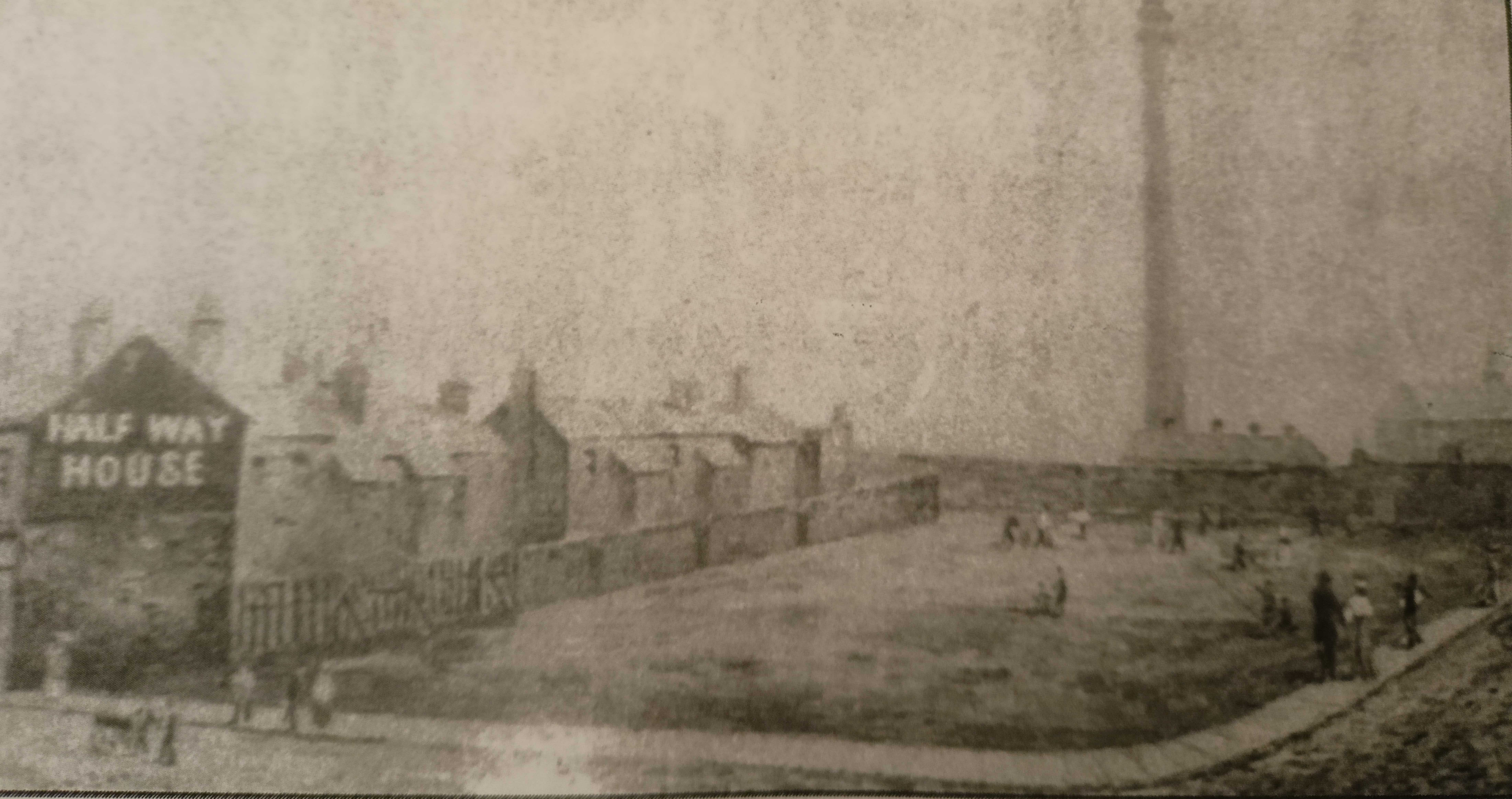
A cricket match at Liverpool's second ground, at Tunnel Road

One of the Liverpool players was Hardman Earle, a railway man, who was involved in the creation of the Liverpool and Manchester Railway line. The Earle family were steeped in the slave trade and were involved in the club from its inception, Hardman Earle owned slave plantations in modern day Guyana. In 1828, the club moved from Mosslake Field to their second ground at Tunnel Road, Edge Hill. The Liverpool and Manchester Railway line opened in 1830, with a station at the club's new ground, most likely placed there by Hardman Earle. In 1846, the railway line was absorbed into the London and North-Western Railway, this allowed perishable goods to be shipped into Liverpool more easily and consequently the ground was sold and became a fruit and vegetable depot.

== Spekefield ground ==
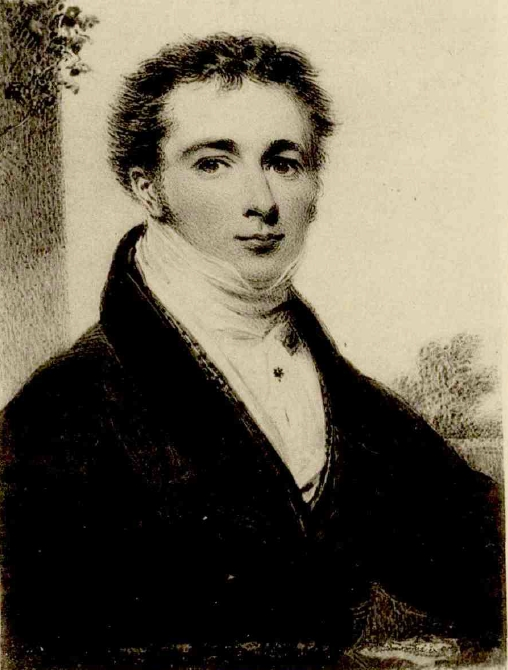
The club played at the estate of Sir Hardman Earle, 1st Baronet, slave owner and railway director

In 1845, the club moved to their third ground, a plot of land leased from Hardman Earle on his Spekefield Estate. The estate had been given to Hardman Earle by his father Thomas Earle, who had been one of Liverpool's most prolific slave traders. The early matches at this ground were between Liverpool and Manchester, or other clubs the members deemed to have a high social standing. The members built a pavilion and employed caterers to cook food, in later years a stone wall was built around the ground allowing spectators to be charged to watch as they came through a gate. In 1847, the fourteen of Liverpool took on a precursor to the England Cricket team, known then as the XI of England, with the match ending in a draw. The members continued to use the club to promote their business interests, many of them were involved in the cotton trade, importing raw cotton from overseas slave colonies, then shipping it to Manchester to be turned into linen for re-export from the Port of Liverpool.

In 1859, their status as Liverpool's leading club was confirmed by a visit from the prestigious Zingari Cricket Club. Zingari visited again in 1861, after this match the satirical magazine Porcupine wrote that the Liverpool team had selected players based upon their social standing rather than their cricketing ability. A rival publication, the Saturday Review, took the opposite opinion writing that the Zingari team had selected players who Lord Sefton had wanted to dine with, as the whole team were staying with him on his estate.

In 1864, the club was involved in the creation of Lancashire County Cricket Club. In 1877, their ground was sold and for three years they had no regular home. William Molyneux, 4th Earl of Sefton, became aware of the club's lack of a ground and offered the use of his own private cricket ground in front of Croxteth Hall while they looked for a permanent home.

== Aigburth ground ==
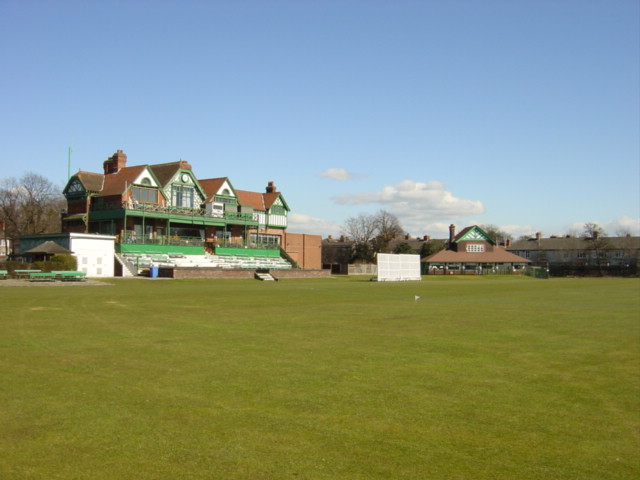
Liverpool Cricket Club's ground in Aigburth

In 1880, with the help of its members, their fourth and current ground was secured in Aigburth. The ground was owned by a company called the Liverpool and South West Lancashire Cricket Company, with Liverpool Cricket Club leasing the ground from them. The owners of the ground included Hardman Earle's son, Sir Thomas Earle Second Baronet, the Earl of Lathom and many other wealthy Liverpool families. This arrangement lasted until 1904 when the owners sold the ground to Liverpool Cricket Club and sent the company into liquidation. The ground was purchased for the sum of £2,000.

In 1881, the club played its first match at the ground against a local team called Dingle. The away team were captained by Henry Miller, a respected all-rounder and former pupil of Uppingham School. The crowd paid six pence to watch. The Liverpool innings was opened by G Dunlop with the match abandoned because of rain. The press recorded the match saying the ground looked admirable. In 1882, the club scored a then record 500 runs in less than five hours. Later in the season, Liverpool and District played the Australia team in a five day match. In 1899, Liverpool played Cambridge University, winning by 200 runs.

== World War I to present day ==
In 1913, Mr H H Hornby, President and member of the club for 65 years passed away. The Hornby family had been members since the club's outset and the death was more keenly felt because the country was on the brink of World War I. A year later, the country was at war and many of its members went off to the front lines. Frederick Harding Turner was the first player who was a casualty. He was shot and killed on 10 January 1915 while supervising a barbed wire arrangement near Ypres in Belgium. The most famous member of Liverpool Cricket Club to die in service was Noel Chavasse, who was one of only three men to be awarded the Victoria Cross twice. The club named the Chavasse Room in the pavilion in his honour.

During World War II the RAF anchored a barrage balloon at the top ground and the Royal Navy occupied the lower ground. The German Luftwaffe attacked Liverpool between 1940 and 1942 and on one occasion they hit the road bridge between the upper and lower grounds. The windows of the pavilion were blown in and the canteen roof destroyed. The club hosted cricket games between military teams to maintain morale.

Liverpool's most celebrated player is Ken Cranston, he was born in Aigburth, Liverpool and came through the junior ranks with the club before moving to Neston CC. He holds the unusual distinction of captaining Lancashire County Cricket Club on his debut. He played eight Test matches for the England cricket team between 1947 and 1948, and captained them twice. In 1993, he became President of Lancashire County Cricket Club.

The pavilion was for men only until 1975, and a sign on the balcony of the pavilion read: 'Dogs and ladies not allowed'. The club is the oldest sporting establishment in the city.

== Sources ==
- Onslow, Tony; Sturgeon, John (2007). Dogs and Ladies Not Allowed: The 200 Year History of Liverpool Cricket Club. Countryvise Limited. ISBN 978-1901231847.
