= Leonard Green (cricketer) =

English cricketer

Leonard Green CB CBE MC TD DL (1 February 1890 – 2 March 1963) was an English cricketer active from 1922 to 1935 who played for Lancashire, and a Territorial Army officer who commanded the 125th (Lancashire Fusiliers) Brigade from 1934 to 1938. He was born and died in Whalley, Lancashire. Green was born in a house built by his Father, Roger Green, who represented the Whalley Cricket Club at the 1864 meeting which led to the foundation of Lancashire County Cricket Club. At the time of his death, he lived in the Manor House which he shared with his brother James.

== Cricketing career ==
He appeared in 160 first-class matches as a righthanded batsman and occasional wicketkeeper who also bowled sometimes, though his bowling arm and style are unrecorded. He scored 3,981 runs with a highest score of 110* among two centuries and held 39 catches. He took twelve wickets with a best analysis of two for 2. He was the Lancashire club captain from 1926 until 1928.

== Military career ==
Green was commissioned in the Territorial Force on 28 April 1910 as a second lieutenant in the 4th Battalion, East Lancashire Regiment, and was promoted to lieutenant on 14 August 1913. The 4th Battalion served in the First World War as part of the 126th (East Lancashire) Brigade, during which time Green was promoted to temporary captain on 17 January 1916 and substantive captain on 26 June 1917, with precedence of 5 June 1917, later backdated to 1 June 1916. He transferred to the Machine Gun Corps (Infantry) as a captain on 25 March 1918, retaining his seniority of 1 June 1916. He was promoted to major in the 4th Battalion East Lancs Regiment on 24 January 1921, and was granted rank as a temporary major in the 4th (Defence Force) Battalion on 9 April 1921. Following the formation of the Territorial Army, Green was confirmed as a major in the 4th/5th Battalion of the regiment on 1 January 1922, and on 16 February 1928 he was promoted to lieutenant-colonel commanding the battalion. He was granted brevet rank as colonel on 16 February 1932 and substantive rank as colonel on 16 February 1934, with seniority from the date of his brevet rank. On 30 September 1934 Green was appointed to command the 125th (Lancashire Fusiliers) Brigade, with the temporary rank of brigadier from 24 November 1937. He relinquished his appointment and temporary rank on 30 September 1938, was made supernumerary to the establishment on 11 April 1945, and having exceeded the age limit, retired from the Territorial Army on 18 June 1948, retaining the rank of colonel.

== Honours ==
Green was awarded the Military Cross on 17 December 1917. His citation read:

For conspicuous gallantry and devotion to duty whilst assisting in extinguishing a fire at the brigade ammunition dump. On hearing than an officer of his company had been severely wounded, he at once went sixty yards across the open, under heavy shell fire, and helped to bring him to the rear aid post, carrying one end of the stretcher himself.

Green received the Territorial Decoration on 5 May 1925, was appointed a Deputy Lieutenant for Lancashire on 2 November 1935, and was made a Companion of the Order of the Bath in the 1937 Coronation Honours. As Commandant of the Lancashire Special Constabulary he was made an Additional Member of the Order of the British Empire in the 1946 New Year's Honours and as Chairman of the Civil Defence Committee, Lancashire County Council, he was advanced to Commander of the Order of the British Empire in the 1959 Birthday Honours. He was High Sheriff of Lancashire in 1954.
