= Lionel Lister =

English cricketer

William Hubert Lionel Lister (11 October 1911 – 29 July 1998) was an English cricketer active from 1933 to 1939 who played for Lancashire. He was born in Formby, Lancashire and died in Bridgnorth, Shropshire. He appeared in 162 first-class matches as a righthanded batsman and an occasional wicketkeeper. He scored 3,709 runs with a highest score of 104* among two centuries and held 74 catches with two stumpings. He was the Lancashire club captain from 1936 until 1939.
