= 1969 English cricket season =

The 1969 English cricket season was the 70th in which the County Championship had been an official competition. The Sunday League (now the National League) began, sponsored by the John Player tobacco company. All matches were played on Sundays with each of the 17 first-class counties playing each other once. Matches were of 40 overs a side. One match each Sunday was televised by the BBC and the idea was a commercial success, though it had its critics among cricket's "traditional" supporters.

One effect of the Sunday League was a reduction in the number of matches played by each team in the County Championship from 28 to 24. Glamorgan won the Championship title. England defeated both West Indies and New Zealand in Test series.

== Honours ==
- County Championship – Glamorgan
- Gillette Cup – Yorkshire
- Sunday League – Lancashire
- Minor Counties Championship – Buckinghamshire
- Second XI Championship – Kent II
- Wisden – Basil Butcher, Alan Knott, Majid Khan, Mike Procter, Don Shepherd

== Test series ==
=== West Indies tour ===
England had a very strong team captained by Ray Illingworth. Other notable England players included John Snow, Geoff Boycott, John Edrich, Alan Knott and Derek Underwood. John Hampshire scored a century on his Test debut versus West Indies at Lord's.

== Leading batsmen ==
John Edrich topped the averages with 2238 runs at 69.93.

Other leading batsmen were Basil Butcher, Mushtaq Mohammed and Barry Richards, who all averaged over 50.

== Leading bowlers ==
Alan Ward was the leading bowler, with an average of 14.82, but he took only 69 wickets, whereas four bowlers took over 100 wickets each. These were Mike Procter, Derek Underwood, Tom Cartwright and Don Wilson, who all averaged less than 17.50.

== Annual reviews ==
- Playfair Cricket Annual 1970
- Wisden Cricketers' Almanack 1970
