= David Hughes (Lancashire cricketer) =

English cricketer

Personal information
- Full name: David Paul Hughes
- Born: 13 May 1947 (age 79); Newton-le-Willows, Lancashire, England
- Batting: Right-handed
- Bowling: Slow left-arm orthodox

Domestic team information
- Years: Team
- 1967–1991: Lancashire
- 1975/76–1976/77: Tasmania
- 1971–1972: MCC

Career statistics
| Competition | First-class | List A |
|---|---|---|
| Matches | 447 | 458 |
| Runs scored | 10,419 | 4,993 |
| Batting average | 21.79 | 20.63 |
| 100s/50s | 8/45 | 0/11 |
| Top score | 153 | 92* |
| Balls bowled | 43,458 | 8,482 |
| Wickets | 655 | 248 |
| Bowling average | 30.31 | 23.55 |
| 5 wickets in innings | 20 | 6 |
| 10 wickets in match | 2 | 0 |
| Best bowling | 7/24 | 6/29 |
| Catches/stumpings | 325/– | 146/– |
- Source: CricInfo, 6 July 2009

David Paul Hughes (born 13 May 1947) is an English former cricketer. David Hughes was a stalwart of the Lancashire side for more than two decades, making 10,419 first-class runs. He batted right-handed and took 655 wickets with his left-arm spin.

Hughes was born in Newton-le-Willows, St Helens, Lancashire. Making his debut in 1967, he was capped in 1970. During the 1971 Gillette Cup semi-final against Gloucestershire on 28 July 1971, Hughes walked out to bat with the time approaching a quarter to nine in the evening and 25 runs still needed from the five remaining overs. There was a suggestion that the umpires would have to abandon play for the day and finish the game the following morning, but, when Hughes queried the light, he was told by umpire Arthur Jepson, "You can see the Moon. How far do you want to see?". Hughes proceeded to hit 24 off a single over bowled by John Mortimore, and set up a Lancashire win. Hughes played for D. H. Robins' XI in South Africa in 1971/72 and for Tasmania in 1975/76 and 1976/77, and accompanied Lancashire on three overseas tours in the mid-1980s, but otherwise stayed at home; of his 447 first-class matches, only ten were not played on British soil. He was captain of Lancashire between 1987 and his retirement in 1991, and in the first of these years Lancashire finished second in the County Championship; in 1988 Hughes was named as a Wisden Cricketer of the Year. As captain he oversaw a successful period for the county in limited-over cricket and they won the Refuge Assurance Cup in 1988, the Refuge Assurance League in 1989, and in 1990 became the first county to win the Benson and Hedges Cup and the NatWest Trophy in the same season. He was given two benefit seasons, in 1981 and 1992, which raised a total of £145,000.
