= 1928 County Championship =

English cricket tournament

- Cricket format: First-class cricket
- Tournament format: League system
- Champions: Lancashire (5th title)

The 1928 County Championship was the 35th officially organised running of the County Championship. Lancashire County Cricket Club won the championship title for a third successive year.

This would be the last instance of where the Championship was decided by calculating the percentage of points gained against possible points available.

== Table ==
- Eight points were awarded for a win
- Four points were awarded for a tie
- Five points for the team leading after the first innings of a drawn match
- Three points for the team losing after the first innings of a drawn match
- Four points for the teams if tied after the first innings of a drawn match
- Four points for a no result on first innings (after more than six hours playing time)
- If the weather reduces a match to less than six hours and there has not been a result on first innings then the match shall be void.

County Championship table
Team	Pld	W	L	DWF	DLF	NR	Pts	%PC
Lancashire	30	15	0	9	3	3	186	77.50
Kent	30	15	5	8	1	1	167	69.58
Nottinghamshire	31	13	3	9	5	1	168	67.96
Yorkshire	26	8	0	8	7	3	137	65.86
Gloucestershire	28	9	6	9	0	4	133	59.37
Surrey	25	5	3	10	6	1	112	56.00
Sussex	30	12	8	4	6	0	134	55.83
Middlesex	24	6	5	7	5	1	102	53.17
Leicestershire	28	6	4	6	11	1	115	51.33
Derbyshire	25	6	6	4	7	2	97	48.50
Warwickshire	28	3	6	10	7	2	103	45.98
Hampshire	28	5	7	5	11	0	98	43.75
Northamptonshire	28	7	13	3	5	0	86	38.37
Somerset	23	4	11	3	5	0	62	33.69
Glamorgan	24	2	9	1	10	2	59	30.72
Essex	28	2	13	5	6	2	67	29.91
Worcestershire	30	0	19	2	8	1	38	15.83
