= 1930 County Championship =

English cricket tournament

- Cricket format: First-class cricket
- Tournament format: League system
- Champions: Lancashire (6th title)

The 1930 County Championship was the 37th officially organised running of the County Championship. Lancashire County Cricket Club won the championship title for the sixth time.

== Table ==
- Eight points were awarded for a win
- Four points were awarded for a tie
- Five points for the team leading after the first innings of a drawn match
- Three points for the team losing after the first innings of a drawn match
- Four points for the teams if tied after the first innings of a drawn match
- Four points for a no result on first innings (after more than six hours of playing time)
- If the weather reduces a match to less than six hours and there has not been a result on first innings then the match shall be void.

County	Played	Won	Lost	First Innings			Points
County	Played	Won	Lost	Won	Lost	No result	Points
Lancashire	28	10	0	8	5	5	155
Gloucestershire	28	15	4	2	6	1	152
Yorkshire	28	11	2	6	4	5	150
Nottinghamshire	28	9	1	10	5	3	149
Kent	28	12	7	5	4	0	133
Essex	28	7	5	7	6	3	121
Sussex	28	7	5	6	8	2	118
Surrey	28	3	4	13	5	3	116
Derbyshire	28	7	8	4	6	3	106
Worcestershire	28	5	9	8	5	1	99
Glamorgan	28	5	9	6	4	4	98
Leicestershire	28	4	10	6	5	3	89
Hampshire	28	5	8	1	14	0	87
Somerset	28	4	11	7	4	2	87
Warwickshire	28	2	9	8	7	2	85
Middlesex	28	3	9	3	10	3	81
Northamptonshire	28	4	12	3	5	4	78

== Notable events ==
- Seymour Clark, keeping wicket for Somerset in five matches, plays nine innings without scoring a single run, still believed to be a first-class record.
