= Frank Watson (cricketer) =

English cricketer

Personal information
- Full name: Frank Bramley Watson
- Born: 17 September 1898; Nottingham, Nottinghamshire, England
- Died: 1 February 1976 (aged 77); Warrington, Lancashire, England
- Batting: Right-handed
- Bowling: Right-arm medium

Domestic team information
- Years: Team
- 1921 to 1937: Lancashire

Career statistics
Competition	First-class
Matches	470
Runs scored	23596
Batting average	36.98
100s/50s	50/111
Top score	300*
Balls bowled	30199
Wickets	407
Bowling average	32.06
5 wickets in innings	5
10 wickets in match	0
Best bowling	5-31
Catches/stumpings	291/0
- Source: Cricinfo, 31 March 2018

Frank Bramley Watson (September 17, 1898 – February 1, 1976) was an English first-class cricketer from St Helens who played for Lancashire.

One of Lancashire's most prolific batsman, Watson originally batted in the middle order before moving up to opener for the latter part of his career. He made 22,833 runs for the county, with a highest score of 300 not out against Surrey in 1928. In that game he set a second-wicket partnership of 371 with Ernest Tyldesley which remains a Lancashire record to this day. He finished the 1928 season with 2,583 runs, his highest tally.
