= Henry Butterworth =

English cricketer

Henry Rhodes Whittle Butterworth (4 February 1909 – 9 October 1958) was an English cricketer active from 1929 to 1937 who played for Lancashire and Cambridge University. He was born in Rochdale and died in Littleborough. He appeared in 47 first-class matches as a righthanded batsman who bowled right arm leg break. He scored 1,014 runs with a highest score of 107 and held 23 catches. He took 80 wickets with a best analysis of six for 50.
