= 1897 County Championship =

English cricket tournament

- Cricket format: First-class cricket (3 days)
- Tournament format: League system
- Champions: Lancashire (1st title)
- Participants: 14
- Matches: 132
- Most runs: Bobby Abel (1,833 for Surrey)
- Most wickets: Tom Richardson (238 for Surrey)

The 1897 County Championship was the eighth officially organised running of the County Championship, and ran from 3 May to 30 August 1897. Lancashire County Cricket Club won the championship for the first time, narrowly beating Surrey.

== Table ==
- One point was awarded for a win, and one point was taken away for each loss. Final placings were decided by dividing the number of points earned by the number of completed matches (i.e. those that ended in win or loss), and multiplying by 100.

Team	Pld	W	L	D	Pts	Fin	%Fin
Lancashire	26	16	3	7	13	19	68.42
Surrey	26	17	4	5	13	21	61.90
Essex	16	7	2	7	5	9	55.56
Yorkshire	26	13	5	8	8	18	44.44
Gloucestershire	18	7	5	6	2	12	16.67
Sussex	20	5	6	9	–1	11	–9.09
Middlesex	16	3	4	9	–1	7	–14.29
Warwickshire	18	3	4	11	–1	7	–14.29
Hampshire	18	4	7	7	–3	11	–27.27
Nottinghamshire	16	2	5	9	–3	7	–42.86
Somerset	16	3	9	4	–6	12	–50.00
Kent	18	2	10	6	–8	12	–66.67
Leicestershire	14	1	10	3	–9	11	–81.82
Derbyshire	16	0	9	7	–9	9	–100.00
Source: CricketArchive

== Leading averages ==
Most runs
Aggregate	Average	Player	County
1,833	50.91	Bobby Abel	Surrey
1,431	43.36	Jack Brown	Yorkshire
1,372	39.20	Ted Wainwright	Yorkshire
1,328	34.05	David Denton	Yorkshire
1,318	42.51	K. S. Ranjitsinhji	Sussex

Most wickets
Aggregate	Average	Player	County
238	14.23	Tom Richardson	Surrey
140	16.38	Johnny Briggs	Lancashire
109	20.38	Frederick Bull	Essex
102	17.77	Willis Cuttell	Lancashire
102	18.52	Jack Hearne	Middlesex
