= Tommy Greenhough =

English cricketer

Personal information
- Full name: Thomas Greenhough
- Born: 9 November 1931; Rochdale, Lancashire, England
- Died: 15 September 2009 (aged 77)
- Batting: Right-handed
- Bowling: Right-arm leg break

International information
- National side: England
- Test debut (cap 393): 4 June 1959 v India
- Last Test: 23 August 1960 v South Africa

Domestic team information
- Years: Team
- 1951–1966: Lancashire

Career statistics
Competition	Test	FC	LA
Matches	4	255	1
Runs scored	4	1,913	0
Batting average	1.33	8.39	–
100s/50s	0/0	0/1	0/0
Top score	2	76*	0*
Balls bowled	1,129	42,219	–
Wickets	16	751	–
Bowling average	22.31	22.37	–
5 wickets in innings	1	34	–
10 wickets in match	0	5	–
Best bowling	5/35	7/56	–
Catches/stumpings	1/–	84/–	0/–
- Source: Cricinfo, 21 October 2009

Thomas Greenhough (9 November 1931 – 15 September 2009) was an English cricketer, who represented Lancashire during the 1950s and 1960s, as well as playing four Tests for England.

After the retirement of Doug Wright, Eric Hollies and Roly Jenkins, together with the disappearance from the county scene of Bruce Dooland and Gamini Goonesena, Greenhough stood as the last county leg spinner of any standing in an era when overgrassed pitches and bowling tactics changing rapidly from the enterprising attack of the 1940s to rigid containment rapidly removed this style of bowling from prominence. Greenhough had nothing like the spin of Wright or Jenkins, but could disguise his googly exceptionally well, although he bowled from a quite long run-up for a slow bowler. During 1959 and 1960, Greenhough formed an extremely valuable complement to Brian Statham – at the time probably the greatest post-war English bowler – but for the remainder of his career a succession of injuries, and form lapses, prevented him reaching the potential those two seasons suggested.

Cricket writer, Colin Bateman, commented that "it was amazing that Tommy Greenhough played Test cricket at all. As a young player with Lancashire, he took a job in a cotton mill during the winter and fell from a gantry. Both ankles were badly broken and his feet ended up different sizes". Bateman went on, "he overcame his handicap to become one of the most inventive leg-break bowlers in the country, performing well when called up in 1959. He could, however, lose confidence, as happened on the 1960 tour of the West Indies, where he did not play a Test."

== Life and career ==
Greenhough first played for Lancashire as early as 1951, after coming from the League club Fieldhouse, but until 1956 he played very little for the first eleven. That season, however, he took 66 wickets for less than eighteen runs apiece, and formed a remarkable trio of spinners with Roy Tattersall and Malcolm Hilton. In 1957, however, Greenhough seemed to lack spin and in 1958 played only eight games out of 28 for the first eleven. It was thus a surprise that, in the dry summer of 1959, Greenhough was able to not only displace both Tattersall and Hilton, but even leap into the Test side against India. Although he did well even when India's lack of batting prowess was taken into account, Greenhough was soon reported for persistently running down the pitch during his follow-through. Once Greenhough corrected this problem he bowled as well as before. Greenhough's record of 93 wickets in 18 county games suggested that, had he not missed five games correcting his run-up, he might have been the leading wicket-taker in England.

In 1960, Greenhough took 111 wickets for Lancashire, and played one Test against South Africa, but 1961 was wiped out by the first of a succession of finger injuries. Even when he had recovered, he again ran into the problem of lacking spin, despite a few good performances as the only recognised slow bowler in a now-weak county side. Despite more finger trouble keeping him out of the Lancashire side for most of 1964, he was awarded a benefit that season and showed when he returned that he still had considerable skill. He achieved a career-best seven for 56 against Worcestershire in the last county match, plus seven for 108 against Marylebone Cricket Club (MCC) in the previous game.

In 1965 Greenhough, though fitter, failed to maintain the promise shown late in 1964, and at the end of July 1966 he was unceremoniously dumped by the county. After being discarded, Greenhough moved back to the South Lancashire League, and was honoured by his original club Fieldhouse with a testimonial in 1977.

Greenhough died, aged 77, in September 2009.
