= Jack Bond (cricketer) =

English cricketer (1932–2019)

- Bond in 1971

Personal information
- Full name: John David Bond
- Born: 6 May 1932; Kearsley, Lancashire, England
- Died: 11 July 2019 (aged 87)
- Batting: Right-handed
- Bowling: Right arm leg break

Domestic team information
- Years: Team
- 1955–1972: Lancashire
- 1974: Nottinghamshire

Career statistics
Competition	First-class	List A
Matches	362	99
Runs scored	12,125	698
Batting average	25.90	12.92
100s/50s	14/54	0/0
Top score	157	43
Balls bowled	67	–
Wickets	0	–
Bowling average	–	–
5 wickets in innings	–	–
10 wickets in match	–	–
Best bowling	–	–
Catches/stumpings	222/–	31/–
- Source: CricketArchive, 8 September 2009

John David Bond (6 May 1932 – 11 July 2019) was an English cricketer who played for Lancashire and Nottinghamshire.

Born in Kearsley, Lancashire, England, Bond began his cricket career playing for Walkden, where he was raised, in the Bolton Cricket League. He was a right-handed middle order batsman and joined Lancashire in 1955, being assured of a regular place in a strong batting line-up in only a few seasons, among them 1962, when he scored 2,125 runs at an average of more than 36. But by the mid-1960s, he was second eleven captain and an irregular first-class cricketer.

Success with the second team, though, led to an unexpected call-up to be first team captain from 1968 and over the next five seasons, Bond led a previously under-achieving side to a run of success in one-day cricket competitions that has not been equalled. Intensely competitive, Bond led by example in the field and often made useful runs, normally batting at No 6 or lower. A mostly young team included future England cricketers such as Barry Wood, David Lloyd, Frank Hayes, Peter Lever and Ken Shuttleworth, and Lancashire recruited proven matchwinners in Clive Lloyd and Farokh Engineer as the overseas stars.

Bond's great ability was to get match-winning performances out of average county players in one-day games, and he was also a pioneer in using spin bowlers as an integral part of a one-day attack. Under him, Lancashire won the Sunday cricket league in its first two seasons, 1969 and 1970, and took the premier one-day trophy, then called the Gillette Cup, for three seasons in a row from 1970 to 1972, a feat that has not been equalled. The county challenged for the County Championship more strongly during Bond's captaincy than for many years, but he did not achieve the same success in the first-class game.

Bond was named as a Wisden Cricketer of the Year for his captaincy in 1971. He also took a memorable catch to dismiss Asif Iqbal, which turned the Gillette Cup Final that year. He retired from Lancashire after the 1972 season, then came back unsuccessfully to first-class cricket as player-manager of Nottinghamshire for a single season in 1974.

In the mid-1970s Bond moved to the Isle of Man, becoming head coach and cricket professional at King William's College. He also revealed himself as a fine table tennis player, leading the KWC team to the top of the Manx leagues and winning the Island championships. He returned to Old Trafford in the 1980s, as the manager of Lancashire.

Bond died on 11 July 2019.

Sporting positions
Preceded by Garfield Sobers	Nottinghamshire County cricket captain 1974	Succeeded by Mike Smedley
