= Ian Austin (cricketer) =

English cricketer

Cricket information
- Batting: Left-handed
- Bowling: Right-arm medium

Career statistics
Competition	ODI	FC	LA
Matches	9	124	315
Runs scored	34	3,778	2,301
Batting average	6.79	27.98	18.11
100s/50s	0/0	2/20	0/4
Top score	11*	115*	97
Balls bowled	475	17,135	15,036
Wickets	6	262	363
Bowling average	60.00	30.35	27.80
5 wickets in innings	0	6	1
10 wickets in match	0	1	0
Best bowling	2/25	6/43	5/56
Catches/stumpings	0/–	35/–	53/–
- Source: CricInfo, 15 May 2019

Ian David Austin (born 30 May 1966, Haslingden, Lancashire) is a retired English first-class cricketer. He made his first-class debut for Lancashire County Cricket Club in 1987 (having played a single Sunday League match for them the previous season) and remained with that county for his entire career, scoring 3,778 runs at 27.98 and taking 262 wickets at 30.35 with his medium-pace seamers in his 124 matches. He also took 363 wickets in List A cricket.

Enormously popular with the Lancashire crowd thanks to his uncomplicated batting style and equally old-fashioned waistline, his most successful period came towards the end of his career. In 1998, he helped his county to both NatWest Trophy and Sunday League success, winning the man of the match award in the final of the former. He then made his One Day International debut against Sri Lanka later in the summer. For these performances he was made one of 1999's Wisden Cricketers of the Year.

Austin was selected for the 1999 World Cup squad, and opened the bowling with Darren Gough in England's opening game, taking 2/25 against Sri Lanka at Lord's. However, his international career was to last just one more match, against Kenya later in the same tournament. He spent the rest of his career at Lancashire, where his benefit in 2000 raised £155,000. Austin played no first-class cricket after early June 2001, but continued to appear in some one-day games for another year.

A useful lower-order batsman, Austin made two first-class centuries. The first of these came in a Roses match in 1991, while batting at no.10. Austin is one of few players to have won the man of the match award in a final of both the NatWest Trophy and the Benson and Hedges Cup, having achieved the latter in 1996.

After some appearances for Cumberland in 2002, and participating in the Lancashire League's Worsley Cup final the following year, Austin retired from first-class cricket at the end of the 2003 season. He returned to the Leagues playing with distinction for St Annes in the Northern Premier League, before returning to his boyhood club, Baxenden and helping them to the Ribblesdale League title, before retiring from all cricket at the end of the 2010 season.
