= Bill Farrimond =

English cricketer

Personal information
- Full name: William Farrimond
- Born: 23 May 1903; Daisy Hill, Lancashire, England
- Died: 15 November 1979 (aged 76); Westhoughton, Lancashire, England
- Batting: Right-handed

International information
- National side: England
- Test debut: 13 February 1931 v South Africa
- Last Test: 29 June 1935 v South Africa

Career statistics
Competition	Test	First-class
Matches	4	153
Runs scored	116	2,908
Batting average	16.57	23.64
100s/50s	0/0	1/16
Top score	35	174
Catches/stumpings	5/2	252/80
- Source: CricketArchive, 7 November 2022

William Farrimond (23 May 1903 – 15 November 1979) was an English cricketer who played in four Test matches from 1931 to 1935. He was born and died at Westhoughton, Lancashire.

Bill Farrimond was widely regarded in the late 1920s and across the 1930s as the second-best wicketkeeper in English first-class cricket, but the man regarded as the best was his Lancashire colleague George Duckworth – and for many years both of them were kept out of the England team by Leslie Ames, who was a much better batsman. The result was that Farrimond played only a handful of county matches each season from 1925 to 1937 before, on the retirement of Duckworth, he finally played two full seasons in 1938 and 1939.

Despite being second-string wicketkeeper at Lancashire, Farrimond played four Tests. In 1930–31, he was picked as second wicketkeeper to Duckworth on the tour of South Africa, and played in two matches when Duckworth was injured. Four years later, he toured the West Indies and played one Test, with regular keeper Les Ames playing just as a batsman in that match. His only home Test match was the game at Lord's in 1935 against South Africa, when Ames again played as a batsman only.

An unobtrusive wicketkeeper, unlike Duckworth, Farrimond was the second wicketkeeper, after Tiger Smith, to make seven dismissals in an innings, then the world record. A useful lower-order batsman, he made his one first-class century for the Minor Counties side in 1934.

He played one first-class match in 1945, a friendly "Roses" match, but at 42 years of age, he did not play again when regular cricket resumed after the Second World War.
