= Aigburth Cricket Ground =

Cricket ground

Coordinates: 53°21′47″N 2°55′09″W

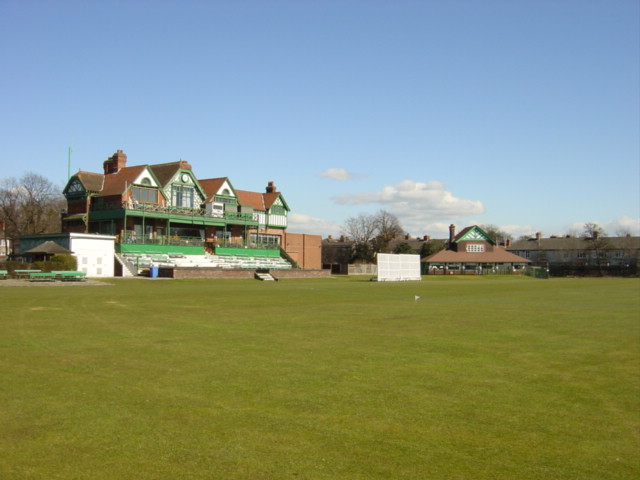
- Interactive map of Aigburth Cricket Ground

Ground information
- Location: Aigburth, Liverpool
- Country: England
- Establishment: 1881
- Capacity: 3,000
- End names
- Aigburth Road; Riversdale Road

International information
- Only women's ODI: 18 July 1973: International XI v Trinidad and Tobago
- As of 23 May 2012; Source: CricketArchive

Aigburth Cricket Ground in Liverpool, England, is the home of Liverpool Cricket Club. The ground, the fourth that Liverpool have used, was created in 1880. Designed by Thomas Harnett Harrison, the pavilion is the oldest remaining at a first-class cricket ground and was granted listed status in June 2023.

== First-class games ==
The ground hosted its maiden first-class cricket match in 1881, a fixture between Lancashire and Cambridge University.

The first Women's Cricket World Cup was held in England in 1973. During the tournament Aigburth hosted its only Women's One Day International, a match between International XI Women and Trinidad and Tobago Women. The West Indies cricket team toured England in 1984 and played a tour match against Lancashire at Aigburth. A 7,633-strong crowd watched the match. Lancashire lost by 56 runs, and Gordon Greenidge scored 186 while opening the batting. The innings was the second of three one-day centuries scored at the ground and remains the highest score in the format at Aigburth, and Greenidge's highest score.

While Old Trafford Cricket Ground was undergoing a renovation in 2011, Lancashire played more cricket at Aigburth, playing five matches at the ground. The move away from Old Trafford coincided with Lancashire winning the County Championship for the first time since 1950, and Lancashire won four out of their six matches at Aigburth. The ground has hosted 198 first-class matches to 2014, eighteen List A matches to 2017 and, as confirmed by the Wisden and Playfair annuals, two Twenty20 matches to 2017.

The ground was kept by the former first-class cricketer George Ubsdell for a 12-year period following the end of his first-class career.

== Football ==
Aigburth Cricket Ground hosted an international exhibition game between England and Ireland on 24 February 1883, which England won 7–0.

== Tennis ==
The ground also co-hosted the prestigious Northern Championships in 1882, then for many years alternating with the Northern Lawn Tennis Club at Didsbury, Manchester. It was also host to the Liverpool Cricket Club Lawn Tennis Tournament (1881-1883).

== Statistics ==
First-class

Category	Information
Highest team score	Gloucestershire (514 v. Lancashire, 1932)
Lowest team score	Glamorgan (22 v. Lancashire, 1924)
Best batting performance	Wally Hammond (264 runs for Gloucestershire v. Lancashire, 1932)
Best bowling performance	Alex Kennedy (9/33 for Hampshire v. Lancashire, 1920)

List A

Category	Information
Highest team score	West Indies (297/6 in 55 overs v. Lancashire, 1984)
Lowest team score	No team has been bowled out for less than 100 on this ground
Best batting performance	Gordon Greenidge (186 runs for West Indies v. Lancashire, 1984)
Best bowling performance	Sajid Mahmood (5/16 for Lancashire v. Sri Lanka A, 2007)
