= Frank Hayes (cricketer) =

English cricketer

Personal information
- Full name: Frank Charles Hayes
- Born: 6 December 1946 (age 79); Preston, Lancashire, England
- Batting: Right-handed
- Bowling: Right-arm medium
- Role: Batsman

International information
- National side: England
- Test debut (cap 458): 26 July 1973 v West Indies
- Last Test: 27 July 1976 v West Indies
- ODI debut (cap 18): 18 July 1973 v New Zealand
- Last ODI: 18 June 1978 v Australia

Domestic team information
- Years: Team
- 1970–1984: Lancashire

Career statistics
Competition	Test	ODI	FC	LA
Matches	9	6	272	232
Runs scored	244	128	13,018	4,857
Batting average	15.25	25.60	35.86	25.97
100s/50s	1/0	0/1	23/67	1/24
Top score	106*	52	187	102
Catches/stumpings	7/–	0/–	176/–	57/–
- Source: CricketArchive, 27 December 2008

Frank Charles Hayes (born 6 December 1946) is a former English cricketer, who played in nine Test matches and six One Day Internationals from 1973 to 1976. He made an unbeaten 106 in his first Test appearance, becoming the thirteenth man to score a century on debut for England, but in eight further Tests (all against the West Indies) his highest score was a mere 29.

For Lancashire he had more success. He made 94 on his first-class debut in the 1970 season, seven years later hit Malcolm Nash for 34 runs in an over (6-4-6-6-6-6) and captained the Lancashire side from 1978 to 1980. He retired in 1984.

Hayes was later director of cricket at Oakham School.
