= Charlie Hallows =

English cricketer (1895–1972)

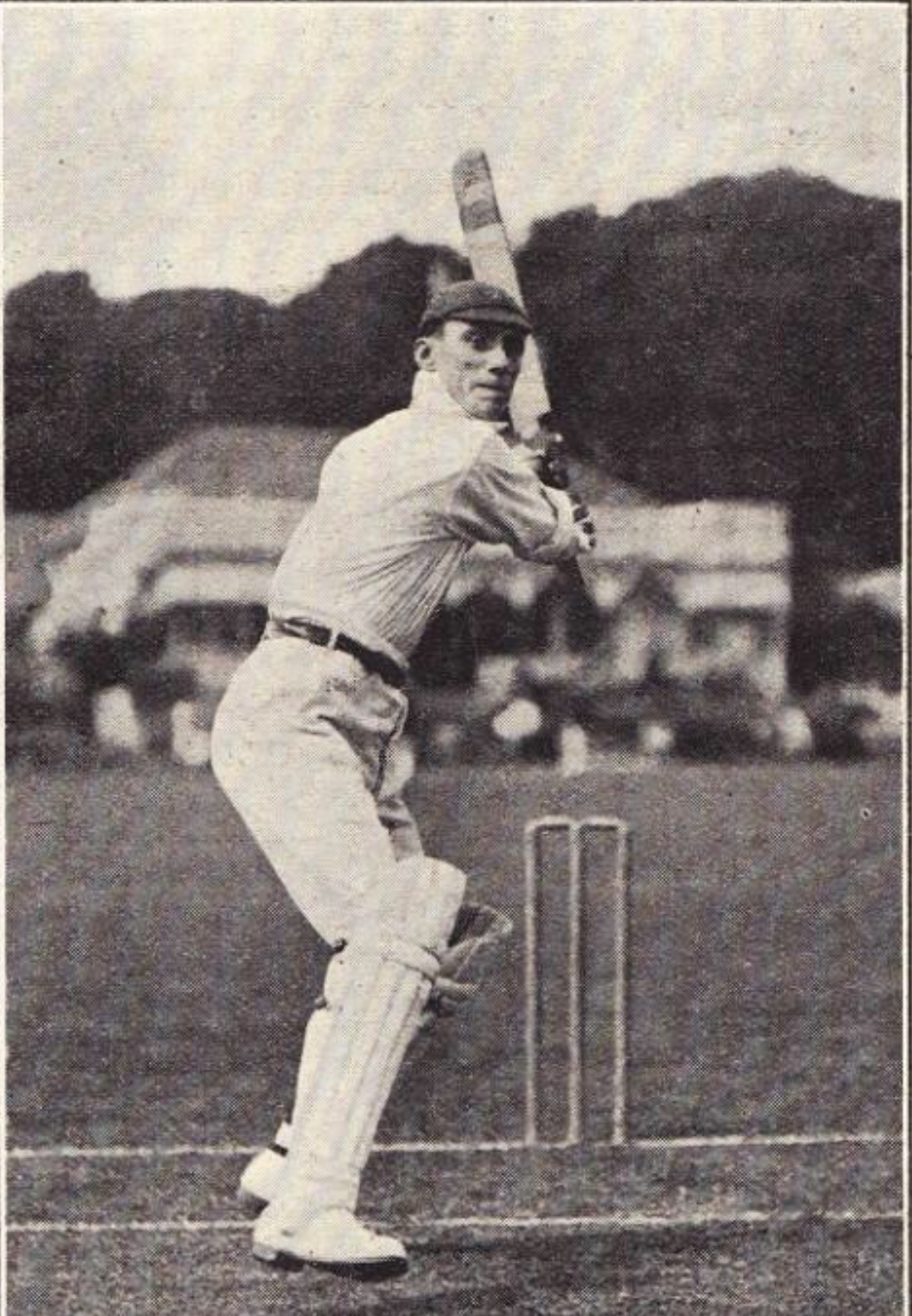
- Hallows in 1921

Personal information
- Born: 4 April 1895; Little Lever, Lancashire, England
- Died: 10 November 1972 (aged 77); Bolton, Lancashire, England
- Batting: Left-handed
- Bowling: Slow left-arm orthodox

International information
- National side: England

Domestic team information
- Years: Team
- 1914 to 1932: Lancashire

Career statistics
Competition	Tests	First-class
Matches	2	383
Runs scored	42	20926
Batting average	42.00	40.24
100s/50s	0/0	55/94
Top score	26	233*
Balls bowled	–	1583
Wickets	–	19
Bowling average	–	39.47
5 wickets in innings	–	0
10 wickets in match	–	0
Best bowling	–	3/28
Catches/stumpings	0/–	142/–
- Source: Cricinfo

Charles Hallows (4 April 1895 – 10 November 1972) was an English first-class cricketer who played for Lancashire and England.

A tall left-handed opening batsman, Hallows provided the attacking flair in the successful Lancashire side in the 1920s. In the County Championship-winning years of 1927 and 1928, he was among the top half-dozen batsmen in England and his career average was more than 40 runs per innings. Yet he played only twice for England, once in 1921 and then again once in the inaugural Tests against the West Indies in 1928, scoring 42 runs in all and being dismissed only once. He was also a fine fieldsman with a superb throw.

In 1928, Hallows scored more than 1,000 runs in the month of May, a feat previously achieved only by W. G. Grace and Wally Hammond and never since. He needed 232 runs to complete 1,000 in his last innings in May. He made that score and was out the next ball. But within four years, he had drifted out of the Lancashire team at the age of 37, taking up a series of professional appointments with league cricket clubs in England, Scotland, Ireland and Wales.

He coached at Merchant Taylors' Boys' School, Crosby, Belvedere College, Dublin, and Kimberley High School in South Africa, before being appointed coach at Worcestershire in 1957. He later took up the same role at Lancashire, retiring at the age of 74 in 1969. David Lloyd says that he was headhunted by the county.

He was a Wisden Cricketer of the Year in 1928.
