= Joe Blackledge =

English cricketer

Personal information
- Full name: Joseph Frederick Blackledge
- Born: 15 April 1928; Chorley, Lancashire, England
- Died: 19 March 2008 (aged 79); Southport, Merseyside, England
- Batting: Right-handed

Domestic team information
- Years: Team
- 1962: Lancashire

Career statistics
Competition	First-class
Matches	26
Runs scored	569
Batting average	15.37
100s/50s	0/2
Top score	68
Balls bowled	18
Wickets	–
Bowling average	–
5 wickets in innings	–
10 wickets in match	–
Best bowling	–
Catches/stumpings	9/0
- Source: Cricinfo, 30 January 2016

Joseph Frederick Blackledge (15 April 1928 – 19 March 2008) was a first-class cricketer who played for Lancashire. He played for just one season – 1962 – captaining the team as an amateur in the year before the players and gentlemen distinction was formally abolished.

A fine all-round sportsman at Repton, Joe Blackledge joined the Army and played much cricket for it in Germany. On leaving the Army, he captained Lancashire's second XI and was a successful batsman for Chorley in the Northern League. He was the second-top scorer in the league in 1961.

The Lancashire team he led in 1962 was one of the weakest in the club's long history and finished second from bottom in the table, losing 16 matches and winning only two. Blackledge hit 33 and 68 in the first match against Glamorgan, but contributed little with the bat thereafter, finishing with 548 runs at 15.65 in the Championship. He returned to running the family textile business at the end of the season.

He later served on the Lancashire committee for many years and was president of the club in 2001.

He was the uncle of the former England rugby union captain Bill Beaumont, who took over the family textile business from him.
