= Ken Cranston =

English cricketer

Personal information
- Full name: Kenneth Cranston
- Born: 20 October 1917; Liverpool, Lancashire, England
- Died: 8 January 2007 (aged 89); Southport, Lancashire, England
- Batting: Right-handed
- Bowling: Right-arm medium

International information
- National side: England

Career statistics
| Competition | Tests | First-class |
|---|---|---|
| Matches | 8 | 78 |
| Runs scored | 209 | 3099 |
| Batting average | 14.92 | 34.82 |
| 100s/50s | -/- | 3/18 |
| Top score | 45 | 156* |
| Balls bowled | 1010 | 11688 |
| Wickets | 18 | 179 |
| Bowling average | 25.61 | 27.84 |
| 5 wickets in innings | – | 10 |
| 10 wickets in match | – | 1 |
| Best bowling | 4/12 | 7/43 |
| Catches/stumpings | 3/- | 46/- |

Kenneth Cranston (20 October 1917 – 8 January 2007) was an English amateur cricketer, who played first-class cricket for Lancashire and eight times for England, in 1947 and 1948. He retired from playing cricket to concentrate on his career as a dentist.

== Life and career ==
=== Early life ===
Cranston was born in Aigburth, Liverpool, where his father Henry Selby Cranston was a dentist. He and his elder brother Ronald were educated at Liverpool College, but Ronald died aged 23 after showing early cricketing talent. Ken Cranston played for the Lancashire Second XI in the Minor Counties Championship before World War II. He served as a dental officer in the Royal Navy during the war. He played cricket for the Royal Navy and Combined Services, and played club cricket in Lancashire after the war. He also played hockey for the county.

=== Cricket career ===
Cranston was appointed captain of Lancashire in 1947, replacing acting captain Jack Fallows. He was an all-rounder who bowled fast-medium and batted in the middle of the batting order. He made his first-class debut on 14 May as captain of Lancashire, in the match against Oxford University. He was immediately successful in first-class cricket, and made his Test cricket debut in the Third Test against South Africa at Old Trafford on 5 July, less than eight weeks after his first-class debut. In the Fourth Test at Headingley, he took four wickets in six balls (w.w.ww) to end the South African second innings.

He was selected as vice-captain of the relatively weak Marylebone Cricket Club (MCC) side that toured West Indies in 1947–48. He captained England once, in the first Test against the West Indies at Bridgetown, as Gubby Allen had pulled a muscle on board the boat carrying them there. The match was drawn, but England ended up losing the four-match series 2–0. He was dropped from the Test side at the start of the following summer, but played one final Test later in 1948, when he was selected for the Fourth Test in the Ashes series against Australia's Invincibles, in which the tourists scored 404 on the final day to win the match.

Cranston led Lancashire to third place in the County Championship in 1947, with the team losing only one match. The team was fifth in 1948. Cranston himself scored over 1,000 runs in each year, and took 84 and then 79 wickets. He also played in two Gentlemen v Players matches in 1947, at Lord's and Scarborough, and again at Lord's in 1948. He resigned as captain of Lancashire at the end of his second season to concentrate on his dental practice in Liverpool. He played for the North of England against the South in 1947, 1949 and 1950, and played his last first-class match in 1950.

=== Later life ===
Cranston practised as a dentist in Aigburth until 1990. He was president of Lancashire County Cricket Club in 1993–94, and was a president of the Lancashire Former Players' Association.

He married twice. He first married Mary Joyce Harrison in 1942. They had a daughter and a son, but were divorced in 1964. He married Joanne Legg later that year; they had a son.

He became the oldest living former English Test cricketer on 28 December 2006, on the death of Norman 'Mandy' Mitchell-Innes. Following his own death eleven days later in Southport, that distinction passed to Arthur McIntyre.
