= Ken Grieves =

Australian cricketer and soccer player

Personal information
- Full name: Kenneth James Grieves
- Born: 27 August 1925; Burwood, New South Wales, Australia
- Died: 3 January 1992 (aged 66); Rawtenstall, Lancashire, England
- Batting: Right-handed
- Bowling: Legbreak googly

Domestic team information
- Years: Team
- 1945–47: New South Wales
- 1949–64: Lancashire

Career statistics
Competition	First-class	List A
Matches	490	7
Runs scored	22,454	210
Batting average	33.66	42.00
100s/50s	29/138	0/2
Top score	224	62*
Balls bowled	17,666	1
Wickets	242	0
Bowling average	29.78	–
5 wickets in innings	8	–
10 wickets in match	0	–
Best bowling	6/60	–
Catches/stumpings	607/4	5/–
- Source: CricketArchive, 5 December 2022
Association football career
- Position: Goalkeeper
Senior career*
Years	Team	Apps	(Gls)
1947–1950	Bury	59	(0)
1950–1951	Wigan Athletic	7	(0)
1951–1956	Bolton Wanderers	49	(0)
1957–1958	Stockport County	39	(0)
- * Club domestic league appearances and goals

Kenneth James Grieves (27 August 1925 – 3 January 1992) was an Australian first class cricketer who played for Lancashire. A middle order batsman, he made 452 first-class appearances for Lancashire and made a county record 555 catches. He often fielded at first slip and in 1951 he took eight catches in a match against Sussex, six of them in one innings.

Grieves was born in Sydney, Australia, and made his first-class cricket debut for New South Wales in 1945. He moved to England in 1947 where he pursued a football career. He played for Bury, Bolton Wanderers and Stockport County, making a total of 147 Football League appearances as a goalkeeper between 1947 and 1958. He also played for Wigan Athletic in 1951–52, appearing seven times in the Lancashire Combination.

His attention soon turned to cricket and he joined Lancashire in 1949. He had previously played some games with New South Wales when in Australia. In his 16-year career he captained Lancashire in 1963 and 1964.
