= Jack Iddon =

English cricketer (1902–1946)

Personal information
- Full name: John Iddon
- Born: 8 January 1902; Mawdesley, Lancashire
- Died: 17 April 1946 (aged 44); Madeley, Staffordshire
- Batting: Right-handed
- Bowling: Slow left arm orthodox
- Role: All-rounder

International information
- National side: England
- Test debut (cap 279): 8 January 1935 v West Indies
- Last Test: 18 June 1935 v South Africa

Domestic team information
- Years: Team
- 1924–1945: Lancashire
- 1927: North
- 1931: Players

Career statistics
Competition	Test	First-class
Matches	5	504
Runs scored	170	22,681
Batting average	28.33	36.76
100s/50s	0/2	46/112
Top score	73	222
Balls bowled	66	38,555
Wickets	0	551
Bowling average	–	26.90
5 wickets in innings	0	14
10 wickets in match	0	2
Best bowling	–	9/42
Catches/stumpings	0/–	218/–
- Source: CricketArchive, 6 October 2022

John Iddon (8 January 1902 – 17 April 1946) was an English professional cricketer who played for Lancashire County Cricket Club from 1924 to 1945, and in five Test matches for England in 1935. He was born at Mawdesley, Lancashire, and died following a motor accident at Madeley, Staffordshire.

Iddon was an all-rounder who played in 504 first-class matches. As a right-handed batsman, he scored 22,681 career runs at an average of 36.76 runs per completed innings with a highest score of 222 as one of 46 centuries. He was a slow left arm orthodox bowler and took 551 first-class wickets with a best return of 9/42. He took five wickets in an innings fourteen times and ten wickets in a match twice. His best match return was 10/85. Generally an outfielder, he held 218 career catches.

== Early years ==
Jack Iddon was born in Mawdesley, Lancashire, on 8 January 1902 and was raised by a cricketing family as his father was the resident professional at Lancaster Cricket Club for many years. Iddon played for the works team at Leyland Motors as a young man and reportedly did well.

=== First season with Lancashire ===
He had joined Lancashire County Cricket Club by the beginning of the 1923 season as he is first recorded playing for the club's Second XI against Yorkshire Second XI in the Minor Counties Championship on 21–22 May that year. The two-day match was played at the old Vicarage Ground in North Ormesby, near Middlesbrough. Iddon, then aged 21, was number 10 in the batting order and was run out for 18 in Lancashire's first innings. They scored 142 all out and Yorkshire replied with 144. Iddon bowled five overs, took 1/28 and held one catch. He opened Lancashire's second innings and scored 12. Lancashire declared on 236/7 but Yorkshire batted out time with 92/2 for the match to end in a draw. One of Iddon's team mates in the match was 22-year-old George Duckworth, the future England wicket-keeper. Iddon made four further appearances for the Second XI between May and August 1923.

=== First-class and County Championship debuts ===
Iddon made his first-class debut in May 1924 and gained an established place in the Lancashire team as the 1924 season progressed. He began in a three-day match against Oxford University at the University Parks ground on 7–9 May. Lancashire won by an innings and 99 runs. Iddon did not bowl in the match and he scored 12 in his only innings. He made his County Championship debut two weeks later, playing against Middlesex at Lord's on 21–23 May. Batting at number 7, he scored 18 and 21* but did not bowl. The match was drawn.

== Test matches ==
Iddon had been a first-class player for eleven seasons before he had the opportunity of playing in international cricket. He was part of an under-strength and much-criticised party of fourteen players that Marylebone Cricket Club (MCC) sent to the West Indies for the 1934–35 Test series. The team was captained by Bob Wyatt and included established Test players in Wally Hammond, Patsy Hendren, Les Ames and Maurice Leyland, but the bowling was weak. Wisden commented on "the lack of real pace (and) a shortage of spin bowlers". Iddon was himself a good spin bowler but he was selected in all four Tests as a specialist batsman and bowled only eleven overs in the entire series.

His Test debut was in the first match of the series at the Kensington Oval in Bridgetown, Barbados on 8–10 January 1935, and it was one of the most remarkable Tests ever played. Wyatt won the toss but, realising that the pitch had been affected by rain, put West Indies in to bat. This was the right choice because, other than the great George Headley, the West Indian batsmen could not cope with the conditions. They were all out for 102, of which Headley scored 44 before he was run out. England struggled too and relied on their own great batsman, Hammond, to pull them through. Iddon joined Hammond at 54/5 and they managed to stay together until the close when England were 81/5.

There was torrential rain overnight and the second day's play could not start until after tea. Then, Leslie Hylton took the wickets of Hammond and Errol Holmes in the first over of the day. Seeing how bad the pitch was for batting, Wyatt boldly declared the innings closed even though England were still 21 behind, Iddon not out 14. West Indies reached 33/3 at the close, a lead of 54. Again, there was a downpour overnight and the pitch was waterlogged. Play on the third day was delayed till 15:30 and West Indies struggled to 51/6 at tea whereupon their captain Jackie Grant emulated Wyatt by a bold declaration, setting England a target of 73 in conditions that were, according to Wisden, "making the ball rise in disconcerting fashion". Thanks mainly to Hammond, England scored 75/6 to win by 4 wickets. Iddon did not bat in the second innings.

== Later years and legacy ==
Iddon was 37 when the 1939 season was terminated, so the Second World War effectively ended his career. Since 1929, he had been the technical representative of a Manchester company which specialised in vehicle brake-linings. He continued this work through and after the war, but hoped to play cricket as an amateur when normal fixtures recommenced in the 1946 season. Shortly before the season began, Iddon was killed in a motor accident at Madeley, Staffordshire, on 17 April 1946. He had been to a business meeting at the Rolls-Royce works in Crewe and was on his way home when he was involved in the fatal collision. His wife, left with two children, was awarded compensation damages of £9,801 at Stafford Assizes. Iddon's grave is in the grounds of St Andrew's Parish Church in Leyland, Lancashire.

In his profile of Iddon, Dave Livermore wrote that his all-round skill made him "an important part of a successful Lancashire team". Iddon's "hard hitting" was complemented by his left-arm spin that was "particularly effective on worn pitches". This was especially the case when he took his career-best 9/42 in the second innings of the 1937 Roses match, which ended with Lancashire's first win over Yorkshire in five years.

Lancashire won the County Championship five times while Iddon was their regular all-rounder: in the 1926, 1927, 1928, 1930 and 1934 seasons. In his book The County Cricket Championship (published in 1958), Roy Webber said Lancashire had been one of the three leading county teams of the 20th century thus far, along with Yorkshire and Surrey. He then included Iddon in a list of twenty Lancashire players of whom he said: "Lancashire have certainly supplied their quota of great names to cricket".

== Sources ==
- Webber, Roy (1958). The County Cricket Championship. London: Sportsman's Book Club. ASIN B0043JJ7T4.
