= Lancashire County Cricket Club =

English cricket club

Lancashire Cricket Club
- Twenty20 name: Lancashire Lightning

Personnel
- Captain: TBA (FC); George Balderson (LA)
- Coach: Steven Croft
- Overseas player(s): Chris Green; Marcus Harris

Team information
- Colours
- Founded: 1864; 162 years ago
- Home ground: Old Trafford Cricket Ground
- Capacity: 19,000

History
- First-class debut: Middlesex in 1865 at Old Trafford
- Championship wins: 9 (including 1 shared)
- Pro40 wins: 5 (joint record)
- FP Trophy wins: 7 (record)
- Twenty20 Cup wins: 1
- B&H Cup wins: 4 (record)
- Official website: Lancashire Cricket
First-class
One-day
T20

Lancashire County Cricket Club represents the historic county of Lancashire (except the Furness area, which is part of Cumbria County Cricket Club) in English cricket. The club has held first-class status since it was founded in 1864. Lancashire's home is Old Trafford Cricket Ground, although the team also play matches at other grounds around the county. Lancashire was a founder member of the County Championship in 1890 and has won the competition nine times. Lancashire has won 26 major honours in its history. The club's limited overs team is called Lancashire Lightning.

Lancashire was widely recognised as the Champion County four times between 1879 and 1889. It won its first two County Championship titles in the 1897 and 1904 seasons. Between 1926 and 1934, it won the championship five times. Throughout most of the inter-war period, Lancashire and its neighbours Yorkshire had the best two teams in England and the Roses Matches between them were usually the highlight of the domestic season. In 1950, Lancashire shared the title with Surrey. The County Championship was restructured in 2000 with Lancashire in the first division. They won the 2011 County Championship, a gap of 77 years since the club's last outright title in 1934.

In 1895, Archie MacLaren scored 424 in an innings for Lancashire, which remains the highest score by an Englishman in first-class cricket. Johnny Briggs, whose career lasted from 1879 to 1900, was the first player to score 10,000 runs and take 1,000 wickets for Lancashire. Ernest Tyldesley, younger brother of Johnny Tyldesley, is the club's leading run-scorer with 34,222 runs in 573 matches for Lancashire between 1909 and 1936. Fast bowler Brian Statham took a club record 1,816 wickets in 430 first-class matches between 1950 and 1968. England batsman Cyril Washbrook became Lancashire's first professional captain in 1954.

The Lancashire team of the late 1960s and early 1970s, captained by Jack Bond and featuring the West Indian batsman Clive Lloyd, was successful in limited overs cricket, winning the Sunday League in 1969 and 1970 and the Gillette Cup four times between 1970 and 1975. Lancashire won the Benson and Hedges Cup in 1984, three times between 1990 and 1996, and the Sunday League in 1989, 1998 and 1999. They won the Twenty20 Cup for the first time in 2015.

== Honours ==
=== First XI honours ===
- County Championship (8) – 1897, 1904, 1926, 1927, 1928, 1930, 1934, 2011; shared (1) – 1950

Division Two champions (3) – 2005, 2013, 2019

- NatWest T20 Blast (1) – 2015
- Gillette/NatWest/C&G/FP Trophy (Note: Formerly known as the Gillette Cup (1963–1980), NatWest Trophy (1981–2000) and C&G Trophy (2001–2006).) (7) – 1970, 1971, 1972, 1975, 1990, 1996, 1998
- Sunday/National/Pro40 League (Note: Formerly known as the Sunday League (1969–1998).) (5) – 1969, 1970, 1989, 1998, 1999

Division Two champions (1) – 2003

- Benson and Hedges Cup (4) – 1984, 1990, 1995, 1996

=== Second XI honours ===
- Second XI Championship (4) – 1964, 1986, 1997, 2017; shared (1) – 2013
- Minor Counties Championship (7) – 1907, 1934, 1937, 1948, 1949, 1960, 1964

=== Other honours ===
- Refuge Cup (1) – 1988
- Lambert and Butler Floodlit Competition (1) – 1981

== Earliest cricket in Lancashire ==
Cricket may not have reached Lancashire until the 18th century. As advised by the Association of Cricket Statisticians (ACS), the earliest known reference to the sport being played in the county has been found in the Manchester Journal dated Saturday, 1 September 1781. It concerned an eleven-a-side match played the previous Monday, 27 August, at Brinnington Moor between a team of printers and one representing the villages of Haughton and Bredbury, who were the winners. As Bredbury was then in Cheshire, the match is the earliest reference for that county too.

In 1816, the Manchester Cricket Club was founded and soon became the main north country rivals of Nottingham Cricket Club and Sheffield Cricket Club. On 23–25 July 1849, the Sheffield and Manchester clubs played each other at Hyde Park in Sheffield but the fixture was styled Yorkshire v Lancashire. It was the first match to involve a team using Lancashire as its name and is sometimes reckoned to have been the first Roses Match. Yorkshire won by five wickets. Teams called Yorkshire, though based on the Sheffield club, had been active since 1833. The Roses Match is one of cricket's oldest and most famous rivalries. In 1857, the Manchester club moved to Old Trafford, which has been the home of Lancashire cricket ever since.

== History of the county club ==
=== Origin ===
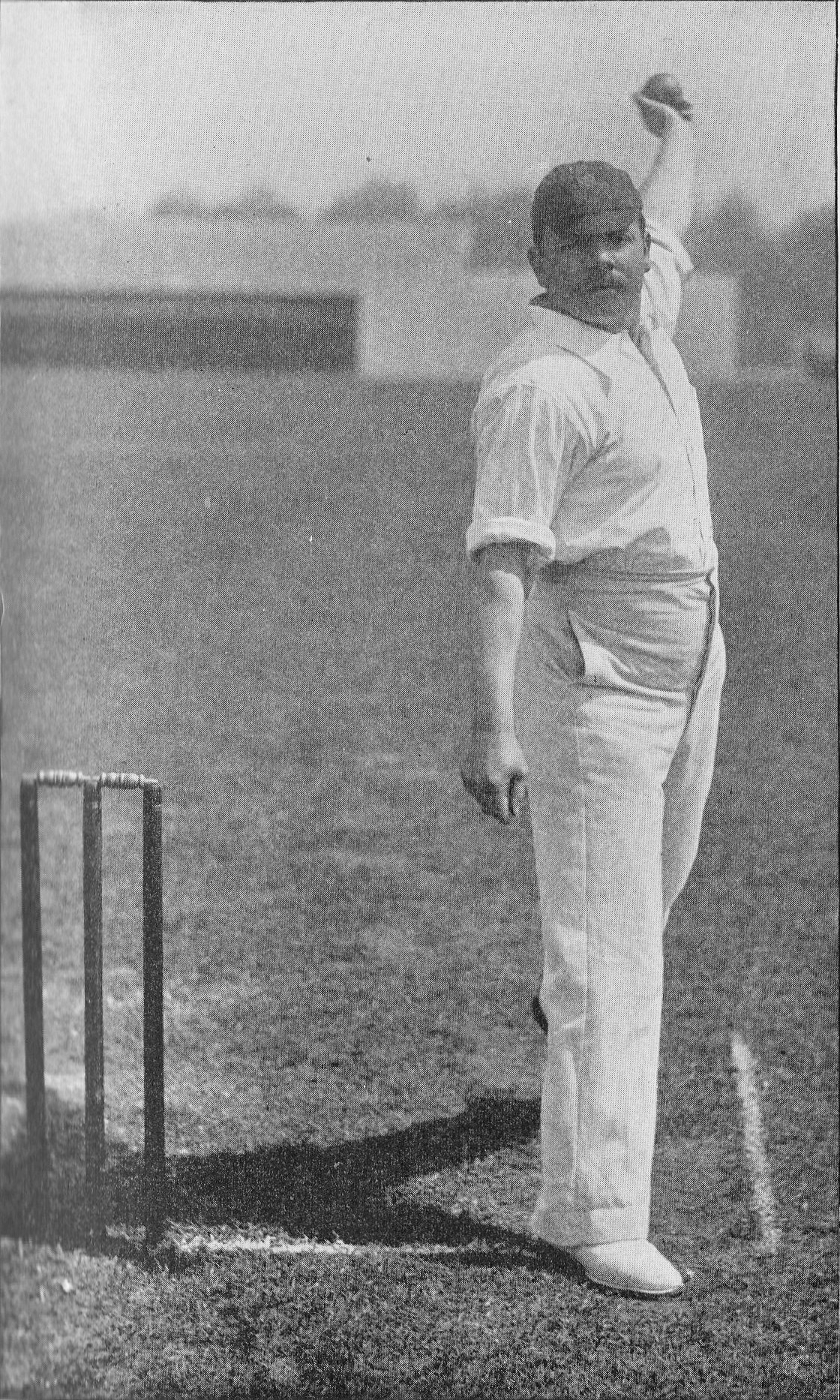
Johnny Briggs played for Lancashire between 1879 and 1900 and is the only player to have scored 10,000 runs and taken 1,000 wickets for the club in first-class cricket

On 12 January 1864, Manchester Cricket Club organised a meeting at the Queen's Hotel in Manchester for the purpose of forming a club to represent the county. Thirteen local clubs were represented: Broughton, Longsight, Manchester and Western from the Manchester area; Huyton, Liverpool and Northern from Merseyside; Accrington, Ashton, Blackburn, Oldham, Whalley and Wigan from other towns. Lancashire County Cricket Club was founded with the object of, it was said, "spreading a thorough knowledge and appreciation of the game throughout Lancashire". It was intended to stage home matches alternately at Old Trafford, Aigburth, Preston, Blackburn and at "other places to help introduce good cricket throughout the county".

The new county club played its first-ever official game at Warrington against Birkenhead Park on Wednesday, 15 June 1864 but that was not a first-class match. The first inter-county match, which was first-class, was played in 1865 at Old Trafford against Middlesex; Lancashire won the match by 62 runs, although Middlesex's V. E. Walker took all ten wickets in Lancashire's second innings.

=== Early successes ===
The early Lancashire team was reliant upon amateurs, which led to problems; although they were happy to play at Old Trafford, they were less willing to travel to away fixtures. During the early 1870s, the team was dominated by A. N. Hornby's batting. The team's standard of cricket improved with the arrival of two professional players, Dick Barlow and Alex Watson. The impact of Barlow and Hornby was such that their batting partnership was immortalised in the poem At Lord's by Francis Thompson. The team was further enhanced by A. G. Steel, an amateur sometimes considered second only to W. G. Grace as the country's best all rounder; Johnny Briggs, a professional from Sutton-in-Ashfield and the only player to score 10,000 runs and take 1,000 wickets for Lancashire; and wicket-keeper Dick Pilling, who in 1891 was rated by Wisden Cricketers' Almanack as the second-best wicket-keeper in the world behind Jack Blackham. As Lancashire's consistency improved, so did their support: in 1878, 28,000 over three days watched Lancashire play Gloucestershire.

The club's first success came in 1879, when the majority of the cricket press – except for Wisden – agreed that Lancashire and Nottinghamshire were joint champions. Lancashire was the champion county in 1881 and again shared the title with Nottinghamshire in 1882.

Dick Barlow carried his bat for just 5 not out in Lancashire's total of 69 in two and a half hours against Nottinghamshire on a treacherous, rain-affected Trent Bridge pitch in July 1882. Barlow and his longtime opening partner Hornby are the opening batsmen immortalised in the famous poem by Francis Thompson. In 1884, Old Trafford became the second ground, after The Oval, to stage a Test match in England. Though it rained on the first day, 12,000 spectators attended on the second; the match between England and Australia resulted in a draw.

Controversy emerged during the 1880s; Kent and Nottinghamshire objected to the bowling actions of John Crossland and George Nash. Nottinghamshire even went as far as refusing to play against Lancashire. Although the 1880s was a period of controversy and modest results for the club, it was also a time in which some club records were established. In 1885 George Kemp (later 1st Baron Rochdale) scored Lancashire's first century in a Roses Match. In that same year Johnny Briggs and Dick Pilling set a first-class record partnership for the tenth wicket of 173 that stood until 1899 and has not been bettered by Lancashire. The club shared the title of champions with Surrey in 1889.

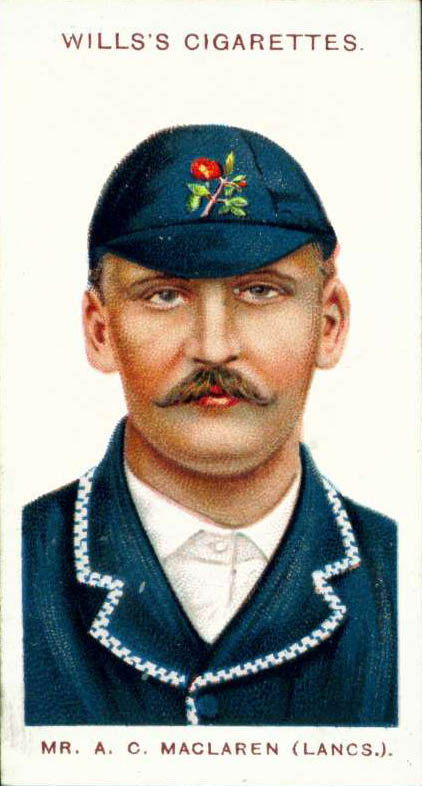
A 1908 cigarette card of Archie MacLaren who captained the club from 1894 to 1896 and holds the record for the highest first-class score by an Englishman.

The County Championship was founded in 1890, and champions were decided by points rather than the press as had happened previously. Lancashire was one of the eight founding teams of the championship along with Gloucestershire, Kent, Middlesex, Nottinghamshire, Surrey, Sussex and Yorkshire. The team was runner up in 1890 and 1891. Archie MacLaren was appointed captain in 1894, four years after making his debut whilst still captain of Harrow. In 1895 MacLaren made his record-breaking innings of 424 against Somerset at Taunton; his innings remained the highest first-class score for an Englishman, was the first first-class quadruple century, and was the highest score in first-class cricket until Bill Ponsford scored 429 in February 1923. Again, Lancashire was runner up in 1895, despite Arthur Mold taking 192 wickets in the season, a feat bettered only twice for the club. The current pavilion was constructed in 1895 and cost £10,000 (£1,140,000 in 2025); it replaced the earlier pavilion, dating from 1857 when Old Trafford was originally built.

Lancashire won its first county championship in 1897, a productive bowling attack made up of Johnny Briggs, Willis Cuttell, Albert Hallam, and Arthur Mold took 420 wickets between them. In 1898 Lancashire bought the ground and some adjoining land from the de Traffords for £24,732 (£2,780,000 in 2025). In 1902, amateur and professional players began walking onto the field side by side in a break with tradition. Lancashire won its second championship title in 1904, going undefeated throughout the season; Wisden described the season as "the brightest in the history of Lancashire cricket". That season, James Hallows completed the feat of 1,000 runs and 100 wickets in the season. During the late 1900s and early 1910s, players such as Walter Brearley, Harry Dean, and Bill Huddleston were the mainstays of Lancashire bowling. The club began to experience financial problems during this same period; the increased popularity of other sports was blamed for the dip in attendances. In 1914, Lancashire sank to its lowest position of eleventh, whilst during World War I the pavilion was used by the Red Cross and 1,800 patients were treated there.

=== The golden era ===
After the war Lancashire developed a very strong batting team, including Ernest Tyldesley and Johnny Tyldesley, both Test batsmen. In 1920, Lancashire finished runner up and bowlers Harry Dean and Lawrence Cook took 274 wickets between them. During 1921, interest in cricket reached an all-time high, with over 250,000 people attending Old Trafford and over 4,500 members. 1922 was a year of contradictions, a strong team winning seven out of fifteen matches by an innings, but still managing to lose seven and finish 5th; that season Cec Parkin and Lawrence Cook mustered 308 wickets between them and Ernest Tyldesley scored over 2,000 runs. Lancashire's steady progress was capped by a hat trick of championship titles between 1926 and 1928 under the captaincy of Leonard Green. In the 1926 victory, Ernest Tyldesley and Harry Makepeace each scored over 2,000 runs. In 1927, Charlie Hallows scored six centuries and the bowling attack was led by Dick Tyldesley and Ted McDonald with support from Frank Sibbles. In 1928, Frank Watson and Ernest Tyldesley scored over 2,000 runs each and George Duckworth claimed 107 victims and earned recognition as one of Wisden's five Cricketers of the Year. At the end of the season Leonard Green decided to retire with a record of three successive championships and 42 wins against just three defeats.

Under the captaincy of Peter Eckersley, Lancashire finished second in the championship in 1929 and reclaimed the title in 1930, with ten victories and no defeats that season. After four titles in five seasons, the early 1930s saw a number of retirements including McDonald and Dick Tyldesley in 1931 and Ernest Tyldesley in 1935: no Lancashire batsman has matched Tyldesley's 100 centuries in first-class cricket. Lancashire won the championship outright for the last time in 1934, the same year that Len Hopwood performed the double of 1,000 runs and 100 wickets (a feat he repeated in 1935) and Cyril Washbrook began to work his way into the team. The captain, Peter Eckersley, retired in 1935 to become an MP. The later half of the 1930s was a period of rebuilding up until the war, with the opening partnership of Cyril Washbrook and Eddie Paynter the highlight. Paynter scored 322 in five hours for Lancashire against Sussex in 1937 having come down on the sleeper train from the victorious Old Trafford Test against New Zealand. He put on 268 in 155 minutes with Cyril Washbrook and celebrated his innings that evening at Brighton's Ice Palace.

=== Post-war ===
When play began in 1946, after World War II, things started badly for Lancashire when the captain and veteran player, Jack Iddon, was killed in a car accident just before the start of the season. Jack Fallows stood in as captain for the season. His successor, Ken Cranston, was an unusual choice as he had no prior first-class experience; despite this his captaincy was not unsuccessful as Lancashire finished third and fifth during his two years in charge. In 1947 Cyril Washbrook and Winston Place both scored over 2,500 runs and scored 19 centuries between them. Washbrook's benefit took place in August 1948 and was watched by 50,000 people; he received £14,000 (£440,000 in 2025), beating the previous record by over £10,000. Despite finishing 11th in 1949, in 1950 – under the captaincy of Nigel Howard – Lancashire shared the county championship with Surrey, winning 16 matches; Roy Tattersall and Malcolm Hilton claimed nearly 300 wickets between them. The 1950 season marked the emergence of Brian Statham. In the following three seasons, Lancashire finished third each time.

With the retirement of Nigel Howard in 1954, Lancashire appointed its first professional captain, Cyril Washbrook, who would captain the club for the next six years. In 1954 Geoff Pullar, Ken Grieves and Alan Wharton all scored over 2,000 runs, whilst Brian Statham, Ken Higgs and Tommy Greenhough all took over 100 wickets; despite this, Lancashire managed to finish only 5th. Lancashire came close to reclaiming the county championship in 1960 under a new captain, Bob Barber. Five batsmen scored more than 1,000 runs in the season, and Statham, Higgs and Greenhough all took over 100 wickets; Lancashire finished runner up due to a poor run of form towards the end of the season: losing four and drawing two of the last six matches after topping the table in August. The following year, however, Lancashire dropped to 13th, due in part to Barber's inexperience and Statham's and Geoff Pullar's England commitments. Things declined further in 1962, under the leadership of Joe Blackledge, who had had no previous first-class experience, as Lancashire dropped to second last, winning only two matches. After a period of unrest, Brian Statham was appointed captain between 1965 and 1967 and Lancashire's results improved. Statham retired in 1968 with 1,816 first-class wickets, a record for the club.

=== Limited-overs success ===
Jack Bond became Lancashire captain in 1968 and remained in the position until 1972. During his tenure, Lancashire performed well in the championship, finishing third in 1970 and 1971. His biggest triumph as captain was the five one day trophies he secured during his five-year captaincy. Farokh Engineer joined Lancashire in 1968, and Clive Lloyd joined in 1969; together Lloyd and Engineer helped establish Lancashire as one of the best one day teams in England. The silverware included a hat-trick of Gillette Cups (1970–72) and the Sunday League twice in successive seasons (1969–1970). Mainstays of the successful one day team included Clive Lloyd, David Lloyd, Barry Wood, Harry Pilling, Frank Hayes, Peter Lever, Ken Shuttleworth, David Hughes and Jack Simmons. In the Gillette Cup semi-final against Gloucestershire in 1971, David Hughes walked to the crease at 8.45pm and hit 24 from an over in near darkness to win the match. David Lloyd was captain from 1973 to 1977 and secured Lancashire's fourth Gillette Cup in 1975, and coming runners up in 1974 and 1976. However, in the late 1970s, the team that had been so dominant in the one day format began to break up. Despite boasting international players such as Lloyd and Engineer, Lancashire's first-class performances never matched the success of the limited overs team.

It wasn't until 1984, under the captaincy of John Abrahams, that the club won more silverware, this time in the Benson & Hedges Cup. Despite a resurgence in limited overs matches, Lancashire finished in the bottom six of the county championship. After suffering defeat in the final of the 1986 Nat West Trophy, David Hughes was appointed captain. Towards the end of the 1980s, Lancashire's team began to develop, with Graeme Fowler and Gehan Mendis building a productive opening partnership, while David Hughes and Neil Fairbrother provided support in the middle order. The bowlers were led by Patrick Patterson and Paul Allott with support from David Hughes, Mike Watkinson and Jack Simmons. In 1987 after eleven successive years in the bottom six, Lancashire finished second in the championship, their highest position in 27 years. Mike Atherton made his Lancashire debut in 1987 – scoring 600 runs in the second half of the season – and Wasim Akram first played for the team in 1988. Lancashire defeated Worcestershire in the final of the Refuge Cup in 1988. The following year the club won the Sunday League on the last day of the season in 1989 and finished fourth in the championship. At the age of 48, in 1989 Jack Simmons retired after having taken 985 first-class wickets for the county.

In 1990, Lancashire won both the Nat West Trophy and Benson & Hedges Cup finals at Lord's. This was the first time any county had won both competitions in the same year; Lancashire narrowly missed out on a treble, finishing runners-up in the Sunday League. Lancashire's consistency continued, and the team finished second in the Sunday League and B&H Cup. Paul Allott and Graeme Fowler were released at the end of the 1992 season. The team lost the B&H final to Derbyshire in 1993. In 1994, young bowlers Peter Martin and Glen Chapple took 50 wickets each. The batting too looked promising, with John Crawley scoring two double centuries and Jason Gallian steadily improving. In 1995, Lancashire again won the Benson & Hedges Cup. In 1996, Lancashire again won the double of the NatWest Trophy and Benson & Hedges Cup. In 1998, with Wasim Akram as captain, Lancashire won the NatWest Trophy and Axa League, and finished second in the championship despite losing only five games in all competitions throughout the season. Apart from the National League second division title in 2003, this was the last time Lancashire won a trophy. 1999 was an eventful year for Lancashire with the debut of Muttiah Muralitharan, the departure of coach Dav Whatmore after just two years with the club and again the team finished second in the championship and won the National League.

=== New century ===
The team that had been so successful in the 1990s began to break up at the start of the 2000s. Since winning their last trophy in 1998, the team has lost eight semi-finals and two finals. In 2008 Lancashire managed to finish second in the County Championship. The competition was divided into two divisions for the 2000 season, with Lancashire in the first division. Lancashire's one day form began to fluctuate in 2000, losing to Gloucestershire in the semi-finals of both the B&H Cup and the NatWest Trophy, and being relegated in the National League. In 2001, Lancashire avoided relegation by just 5 points and were not promoted in the National League. The end of the season saw the retirement of Ian Austin from first-class cricket and of Mike Atherton from all forms of cricket. John Crawley left the club in the winter after not being retained as captain. Between 2001 and 2002 saw the squad change significantly, with players recruited from Essex, Northamptonshire, Worcestershire, and Yorkshire; the most notable additions to the squad were Stuart Law and David Byas – the Yorkshire captain of the previous season. After a quiet 2001 season – finishing mid-table in the county championship and again failing to secure promotion in the National League – 2002 was far more encouraging. Mike Watkinson was appointed cricket manager, and Stuart Law and Alec Swann both scored over 1,000 first-class runs and Peter Martin and Glen Chapple both took more than 50 wickets; the find of the season was that of James Anderson, who burst onto the scene with 50 wickets in the second half of the season, earning him a promotion to the England team. At the end of the season, Lancashire stalwarts Neil Fairbrother and Graham Lloyd retired.

2003 was a promising year, and Lancashire were genuine contenders for the county championship. Mark Chilton, Carl Hooper and Mal Loye all scored over 1,000 runs and Stuart Law was player of the year with 1,820 runs. Altogether, 28 championship centuries were scored for Lancashire, the second highest total in a season for the club. Gary Keedy was lead wicket taker with 60 wickets, supported by Martin and Chapple who took 41 and 49 respectively. They were promoted from the second division of the National League, lost in the semi-final of the C&G Trophy, and finished second in the county championship.

In 2004, Lancashire were relegated to the second division of the County Championship for the first time since the competition was restructured into two divisions. This was despite starting the season as the bookmarkers' favourite to win the competition. At one point in the season, the team was without eight bowlers, with James Anderson, Andrew Flintoff, and Sajid Mahmood on international duty, while Glen Chapple, Dominic Cork, Kyle Hogg, Peter Martin, and all-rounder Carl Hooper were all injured. Their problems were not blamed solely on the injuries, Watkinson said "quite simply the opposition have done the basics better than us. In addition we've one or two who are out of form on top of the injury list which ripped us to pieces". Despite being relegated in the County Championship, the team managed finish as runners up in the National League and were expected to be promoted back to the first division of first-class cricket in the 2005 season. While Watkinson expected backlash from the fans, he said that "they were tremendously understanding about the injury situation". The squad underwent changes, with six players leaving – including Martin and Chris Schofield – and six joining, as well as a change of captain from wicket-keeper Warren Hegg to batsman Mark Chilton; Chilton was the club's first Yorkshire-born captain. Between 1864 and 2004, Lancashire played 2,790 matches, winning 1,034, losing 583, drawing 1,170, with three tied matches. In this period, no other team had drawn more matches. The team's percentage of wins was 37.06%, third behind Yorkshire (44.05%) and Surrey (39.74%).

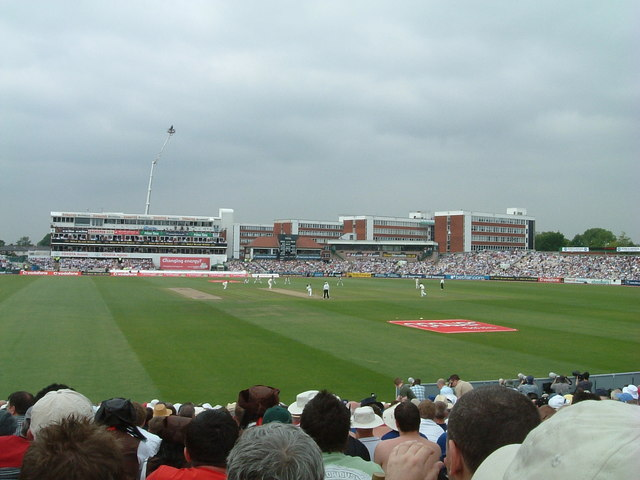
Old Trafford in 2007, before the ground was renovated

Lancashire were promoted back to the first division of the county championship in 2005, winning the second division title in the process. They stayed up in the National League, progressed to the finals' day of the Twenty20 Cup and were knocked out in the semi-final of the C&G Trophy. Despite winning the second division title, there were concerns that the squad may have been getting too old and that there were limited opportunities for the younger players. Of Lancashire's performance over the season, Watkinson said "I was not happy about our batting and, although we have achieved what we set out to do – get promoted – our performance left a lot to be desired". Lancashire are one of three teams, along with Middlesex and Surrey, never to have finished bottom in the County Championship. On their return to the first division in the 2006 season, Lancashire finished second in the Championship. They also finished as runners-up in the NatWest Trophy.

In 2007, although they led the table before the final round of matches, Lancashire were again runners-up in the County Championship. After being knocked out of the Twenty20 competition in the group states and performing poorly in the other one-day competitions early in the season, supporters started to become discontented with the captain and coach. Sussex ended up winning the title as Lancashire lost their final match of the competition against Surrey. Chris Adams, the Sussex captain, said "you played well, you had a hard season, there's no shame in your performance and you nearly did it". After the match against Surrey, Chilton was in tears and said "I'm extremely proud of what our guys have achieved though. As captain I'm privileged to have seen the efforts they have put in. To get close to our target was a phenomenal effort but the lads are just broken. Our players have risen to an almighty challenge and to come so close is an enormous effort". After three years as captain, Mark Chilton stepped down in October 2007 and was replaced by Stuart Law who is the most successful captain in Australian domestic cricket. However his captaincy lasted for just one season, and Lancashire again failed to claim any silverware. At the end of the season Law and veteran player Cork were released, with Chapple replacing Law as captain. In December 2008, Watkinson's job as cricket manager was changed to that of director of cricket – a job which would focus solely on aspects of cricket, rather than the traditional all-encompassing job of general team management. The move was explained by the club chairman as an effort to modernise.

In February 2009, it was announced that Peter Moores – who had been sacked as England coach the previous month – would be Lancashire's new coach and had a three-year contract. In 2011 Chapple and Moores took Lancashire to their first outright first-class county championship title since 1934, although they had shared the title with Surrey in 1950. Despite being reigning champions in 2012, Lancashire had a poor season and were relegated to the Second Division. In 2013 they bounced straight back to Division 1 by winning the second division championship with a game to spare. They were once again relegated to Division 2 on the last day of the 2014 season after failing to win a tightly fought game against Middlesex. Ashley Giles (formerly of Warwickshire and England) was appointed as Director of Cricket and Head Coach after Mike Watkinson stepped down from the role in October 2014.

Lancashire gained immediate promotion in 2015, finishing as Division Two runners-up behind Surrey, and enjoyed the bonus of winning the T20 Cup for the first time. They were well served that season by overseas players Kyle Jarvis and Ashwell Prince. They finished seventh in 2016 and then improved to finish second in 2017, though they were a long way behind the runaway winners Essex. The team struggled in 2018 and were relegated. In 2019, the team went unbeaten in Division 2 to comfortably win promotion back up to Division 1.

On 30 March 2020, the chairman of the club David Hodgkiss died at the age of 71 due to coronavirus disease 2019 complications during the coronavirus pandemic. am

On 10 May 2024, it was announced that The King, as Duke of Lancaster, had agreed to become the club's patron, taking over from the previous Duke, Queen Elizabeth II.

== Ground ==
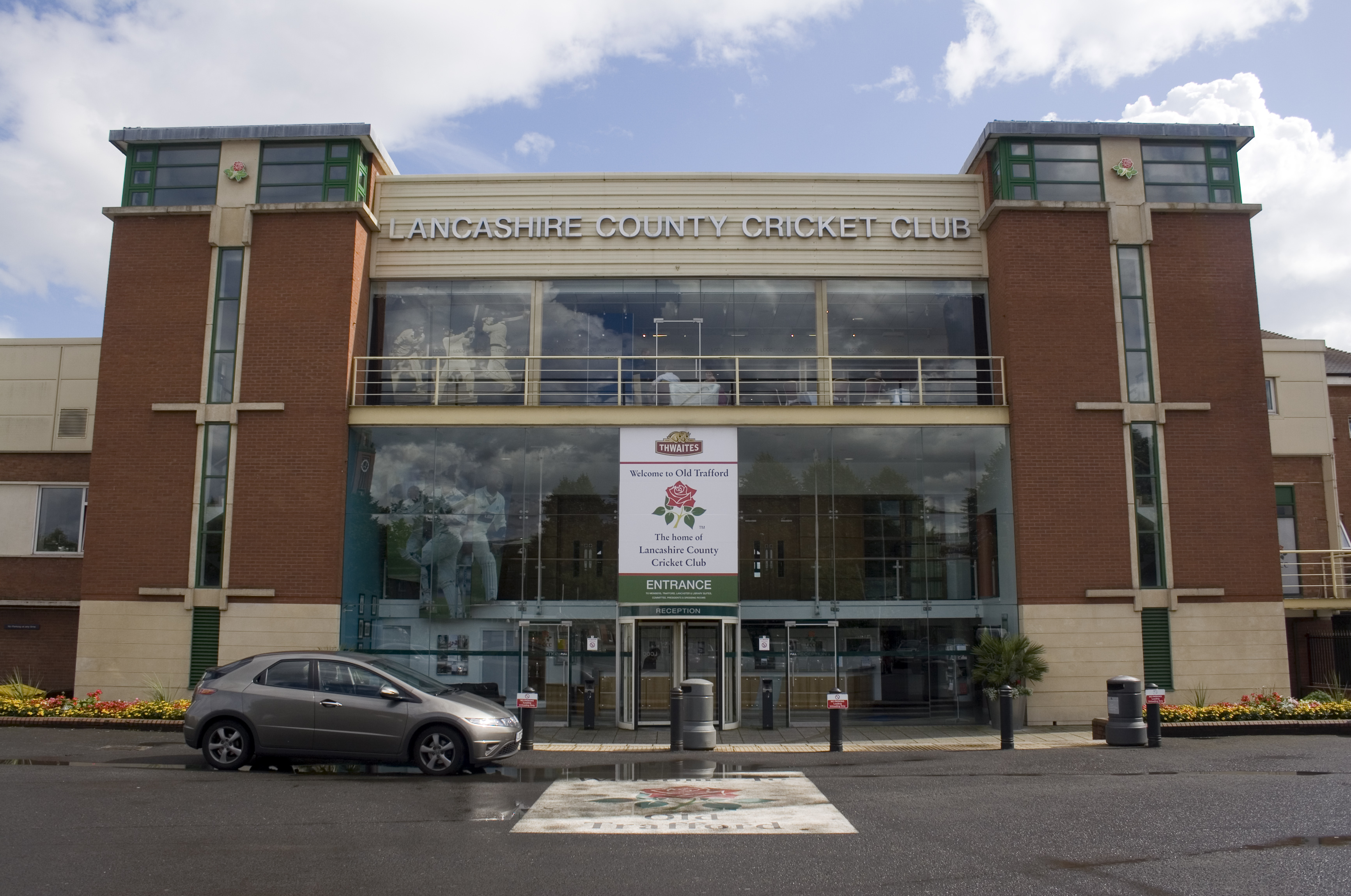
The ground's main entrance

Since its formation, Lancashire has played home matches at Old Trafford Cricket Ground, west of Manchester city centre. Old Trafford has played host to international matches since 1884.

Lancashire also play matches at Blackpool Cricket Club, Liverpool Cricket Club, Southport and an annual fixture at Sedbergh School. The club's official second base at Farington opened in 2026.

== Finances ==
Lancashire Cricket Club has a record of strong finances which has been attributed to several factors including its diverse facilities and having the largest membership in the country. The Old Trafford Lodge is a hotel which is part of the ground and the ground has been used for conference facilities and has staged music concerts. Another source of income is opening the ground's car park during Manchester United F.C.'s home matches. Between 2004 and 2006, the club made record profits, each year getting progressively better and in 2006 recorded a profit of £747,370. While in 2009 more than half of the 18 counties were in profit, 15 in 2010 experienced financial losses, Lancashire included. The total losses of the 18 counties amounted to over £9 million. Lancashire suffered losses of £2.1 million for 2010, primarily because of the club's investment in rebuilding Old Trafford, particularly the construction of The Point. The absence of Test cricket and legal action related to the ground's redevelopment also contributed to the financial loss.

== Players ==
=== Current squad ===
- No. denotes the player's squad number, as worn on the back of their shirt.
- ‡ denotes players with international caps.
- * denotes a player who has been awarded a county cap.

No.	Name	Nat	Birth date	Batting style	Bowling style	Notes
Batsmen
1	Keaton Jennings* ‡	England	19 June 1992 (age 34)	Left-handed	Right-arm medium	
11	Rocky Flintoff	England	7 April 2008 (age 18)	Right-handed	Right-arm medium	
12	Marcus Harris* ‡	Australia	21 July 1992 (age 34)	Left-handed	—	Overseas player
20	Josh Bohannon*	England	9 April 1997 (age 29)	Right-handed	Right-arm medium	
23	Liam Livingstone* ‡	England	4 August 1993 (age 33)	Right-handed	Right-arm leg break	White ball contract
44	Michael Jones ‡	Scotland	5 January 1998 (age 28)	Right-handed	Right-arm off break	
All-rounders
3	Luke Wells*	England	29 December 1990 (age 35)	Left-handed	Right-arm leg break	
10	George Balderson*	England	11 October 2000 (age 26)	Right-handed	Right-arm medium	Captain (List A)
18	Arav Shetty	England	26 June 2004 (age 22)	Right-handed	Right-arm off break	
19	Ben Walkden	England	19 September 2002 (age 24)	Right-handed	Right-arm fast-medium	
33	Paul Coughlin	England	23 October 1992 (age 34)	Right-handed	Right-arm fast-medium	
93	Chris Green* ‡	Australia	1 October 1993 (age 33)	Right-handed	Right-arm off break	Overseas player
—	Ben Charlesworth	England	19 November 2000 (age 25)	Left-handed	Right-arm fast-medium	
Wicket-keepers
6	Jos Buttler* ‡	England	8 September 1990 (age 36)	Right-handed	—	England central contract
7	Phil Salt* ‡	England	28 August 1996 (age 30)	Right-handed	Right-arm off break	England central contract
21	Matthew Hurst	England	10 December 2003 (age 22)	Right-handed	—	
24	Joe Moores	England	15 September 2008 (age 18)	Left-handed	—	
Bowlers
2	Tom Hartley* ‡	England	3 May 1998 (age 28)	Right-handed	Slow left-arm orthodox	
4	Jack Blatherwick	England	4 June 1998 (age 28)	Right-handed	Right-arm fast-medium	
5	Charlie Barnard	England	5 November 2004 (age 21)	Right-handed	Slow left-arm orthodox	
8	Tom Bailey*	England	21 April 1991 (age 35)	Right-handed	Right-arm fast-medium	
13	Tom Aspinwall	England	13 March 2004 (age 22)	Right-handed	Right-arm fast-medium	
14	Luke Wood ‡	England	2 August 1995 (age 31)	Left-handed	Left-arm fast-medium	White ball contract
22	Ollie Sutton	England	25 January 2000 (age 26)	Left-handed	Left-arm fast-medium	
25	Saqib Mahmood* ‡	England	25 February 1997 (age 29)	Right-handed	Right-arm fast	England central contract; White ball contract
38	Mitchell Stanley	England	17 March 2001 (age 25)	Right-handed	Right-arm fast	England development contract
39	Ajeet Singh Dale	England	2 July 2000 (age 26)	Right-handed	Right-arm fast-medium	
77	Luke Hands	England	14 November 2008 (age 17)	Right-handed	Right-arm fast-medium	
—	George Brown	England	15 January 2008 (age 18)	Right-handed	Right-arm fast-medium	
Source: Updated: 27 September 2026

== Captains ==
Name	Years as Captain
Jimmy Anderson	2025
Marcus Harris	2025
Keaton Jennings	2023–2025
Dane Vilas	2019–2022
Liam Livingstone	2018
Steven Croft	2016–2017
Tom Smith	2015
Glen Chapple	2009–2014
Stuart Law	2008
Mark Chilton	2005–2007
Warren Hegg	2002–2004
John Crawley	1999–2001
Wasim Akram	1998
Mike Watkinson	1994–1997
Neil Fairbrother	1992–1993
David Hughes	1987–1991
Clive Lloyd	1981–1983, 1986
John Abrahams	1984–1985
Frank Hayes	1978–1980
David Lloyd	1973–1977
Jack Bond	1968–1972
Brian Statham	1965–1967
Ken Grieves	1963–1964
Joe Blackledge	1962
Bob Barber	1960–1961
Cyril Washbrook	1954–1959
Nigel Howard	1949–1953
Ken Cranston	1947–1948
Jack Fallows	1946
Jack Iddon	1946 (Note: captain-elect; killed in RTA pre-season)
WWII: No County Cricket	1939–1945
Lionel Lister	1936–1939
Peter Eckersley	1929–1935
Leonard Green	1926–1928
Jack Sharp	1923–1925
Myles Noel Kenyon	1919–1922
WW1: No County Cricket	1914–1918
A. H. Hornby	1879–1893, 1897–1898, 1908–1914
Archie MacLaren	1894–1896, 1899–1906
Edmund Rowley	1866–1879

== Records ==
=== Player records ===
Batting

	Player	Information
Highest scores	1. Archie MacLaren; 2. Neil Fairbrother; 3. Eddie Paynter	424 v. Somerset, County Ground, Taunton, 1895; 366 v. Surrey, The Oval, London, 1990; 322 v. Sussex, County Ground, Hove, 1937
Most runs in season	1. Johnny Tyldesley; 2. Eddie Paynter; 3. Charlie Hallows	2,633, 1901; 2,626, 1937; 2,564, 1928

Bowling

	Player	Information
Best bowling (innings)	1. William Hickton; 2. Johnny Briggs; 3. Bob Berry	10–46 v. Hampshire, Old Trafford, Manchester, 1870; 10–55 v. Worcestershire, Old Trafford, Manchester, 1900; 10–102 v. Worcestershire, Stanley Park, Blackpool, 1953
Best bowling (match)	1. Harry Dean; 2. Walter Brearley; 3. Harry Dean	17–91 v. Yorkshire, Aigburth, Liverpool, 1913; 17–137 v. Somerset, Old Trafford, Manchester, 1905; 16–103 v. Somerset, Recreation Ground, Bath, 1910
Most wickets in season	1. Ted McDonald; 2. Cecil Parkin; 3. Arthur Mold	198, 1925; 194, 1924; 192, 1895

Wicket-keeping

	Player	Information
Most victims in innings	1. Bill Farrimond; 2. Warren Hegg	7 v. Kent, Old Trafford, Manchester, 1930; 7 v. Derbyshire, Queen's Park, Chesterfield, 1989
Most victims in season	1. George Duckworth; 2. Geoff Clayton	97, 1928; 92, 1962

Most first-class runs for Lancashire
Qualification – 20,000 runs

Player	Runs
Ernest Tyldesley	34,222
Johnny Tyldesley	31,949
Cyril Washbrook	27,863
Harry Makepeace	25,207
Frank Watson	22,833
Jack Sharp	22,015
Jack Iddon	21,975
Ken Grieves	20,802
Charlie Hallows	20,142

Most first-class wickets for Lancashire
Qualification – 1,000 wickets

Player	Wickets
Brian Statham	1,816
Johnny Briggs	1,696
Arthur Mold	1,541
Dick Tyldesley	1,449
Alexander Watson	1,309
Harry Dean	1,267
Roy Tattersall	1,168
Ted McDonald	1,053
Ken Higgs	1,033
Dick Pollard	1,015

=== Team totals ===
Highest total for – 863 v. Surrey, The Oval, London, 1990

Highest total against – 707 for 9 Dec by Surrey, The Oval, London, 1990

Lowest total for – 25 v. Derbyshire, Old Trafford, Manchester, 1871

Lowest total against – 20 by Essex, County Cricket Ground, Chelmsford, Chelmsford, 2013

=== Partnership record for each wicket ===
Wicket	Score	Batting partners	Opposition	Venue	City	Year
1st	368	Archie MacLaren and Reggie Spooner	Gloucestershire	Aigburth	Liverpool	1903
2nd	371	Frank Watson and Ernest Tyldesley	Surrey	Old Trafford	Manchester	1928
3rd	501	Alviro Petersen and Ashwell Prince	Glamorgan	Penrhyn Avenue	Colwyn Bay	2015
4th	358	Stephen Titchard and Graham Lloyd	Essex	County Ground	Chelmsford	1996
5th	360	Stuart Law and Carl Hooper	Warwickshire	Edgbaston	Birmingham	2003
6th	278	Jack Iddon and Henry Butterworth	Sussex	Old Trafford	Manchester	1932
7th	248	Graham Lloyd and Ian Austin	Yorkshire	Headingley	Leeds	1997
8th	187	Luke Wood and Danny Lamb	Kent	St Lawrence Ground	Canterbury	2021
9th	142	Les Poidevin and Alexander Kermode	Sussex	The Saffrons	Eastbourne	1907
10th	173	Johnny Briggs and Dick Pilling	Surrey	Aigburth	Liverpool	1885

== See also ==
- Lancashire County Cricket Club in 2005
- List of cricket grounds in England and Wales
- List of Test cricket grounds
