= List of Lancashire County Cricket Club players =

This is a list in alphabetical order of cricketers who have played for Lancashire County Cricket Club in top-class matches since the club was founded in 1864. Lancashire have held first-class status since their inaugural match in 1865. The details are the player's usual name followed by the seasons in which he was active as a Lancashire player. The list excludes Second XI and other players who did not play for the club's first team; and players whose first team appearances were in minor matches only.

Many players represented other top-class teams besides Lancashire and some played for the old Manchester Cricket Club before 1864. Eight of those represented a Manchester team styled Lancashire in 1864 before going on to play in first-class matches for the new club from 1865. Players who represented the county before 1865 are included if they also played for the county club but excluded if not. The list has been updated to August 2026.

As of 3 August 2026

== A ==
- John Abrahams (1973–1988)
- Andrea Agathangelou (2011–2014)
- Thomas Ainscough (1894–1906)
- Jerry Ainsworth (1899)
- Ralph Alderson (1946–1949)
- Finn Allen (2021)
- Paul Allott (1978–1992)
- James Anderson (2001–2026)
- Arthur Appleby (1864–1887)
- James Arnold (1896)
- Robert Arrowsmith (1975–1979)
- John Ashworth (1871–1873)
- Tom Aspinwall (2023–2026)
- Nathan Astle (2006)
- Michael Atherton (1987–2001)
- Graham Atkinson (1967–1969)
- Ian Austin (1986–2001)

== B ==
- David Bailey (1968–1969)
- Tom Bailey (2012–2026)
- George Baker (1887–1899)
- George Balderson (2020–2026)
- Stanley Banham (1939)
- Horatio Barber (1866–1867)
- John Barber (1874–1876)
- Bob Barber (1954–1962)
- Harry Barchard (1888)
- Peter Barcroft (1956)
- Robert Bardsley (1910–1920)
- Gerald Bardswell (1894–1902)
- Alfred Barlow (1947–1951)
- Edwin Barlow (1932)
- Dick Barlow (1871–1892)
- Charlie Barnard (2024–2026)
- John Barnes (1919–1930)
- Sydney Barnes (1899–1903)
- Alex Barnett (1992–1994)
- Ben Barrell (1911–1923)
- Bill Barron (1945)
- Frederick Baucher (1903)
- Arthur Baxter (1933–1934)
- Fred Beattie (1932)
- Douglas Beckett (1980–1981)
- Mike Beddow (1962–1966)
- George Bell (2022–2026)
- Albert Bennett (1932–1933)
- Henry Bennett (1894)
- Bob Bennett (1962–1966)
- Charles Benton (1892–1901)
- Bob Berry (1948–1954)
- George Biddolph (1885)
- George Bigg (1887)
- George Bird (1880)
- Morice Bird (1907)
- Francis Birley (1870–1872)
- Alexander Birtwell (1937–1939)
- Jack Blatherwick (2021–2026)
- Joe Blackledge (1962)
- Richard Blackstock (1865)
- Wilfred Blake (1877)
- Edward Bleackley (1919)
- Benjamin Blomley (1903–1922)
- Robert Boddington (1913–1924)
- Reginald Boden (1907)
- Josh Bohannon (2018–2026)
- Alan Bolton (1957–1963)
- Jack Bond (1955–1972)
- Arthur Booth (1950–1951)
- Brian Booth (1956–1963)
- Frank Booth (1927–1937)
- Edwin Bousfield (1865–1878)
- Ernest Bowden (1914)
- William Bower (1885–1886)
- John Bowes (1938–1948)
- Kenneth Bowling (1954)
- Richard Bowman (1957–1959)
- Josh Boyden (2024)
- Richard Boys (1877)
- Thomas Bradbury (1881)
- James Braddock (1873)
- Steven Bramhall (1990)
- Walter Brearley (1902–1911)
- Tom Brierley (1946–1948)
- Johnny Briggs (1879–1900)
- Jack Briggs (1939)
- John Brocklebank (1939)
- Francis Brooke (1912–1913)
- Abraham Brooks (1877)
- John Broughton (1901–1902)
- Karl Brown (2006–2018)
- William Brown (1894)
- Billy Brown (1919–1922)
- Tom Bruce (2024)
- Nathan Buck (2015–2016)
- Leslie Bulcock (1946) (Note: Bulcock, who was born at Colne in 1911 and educated at Park School in the town, played a single first-class match for the county during the 1946 season. Opening both the batting and bowling against Sussex, he scored a single run in his only innings and took two wickets in the match. He played league cricket for Colne Cricket Club from 1929 until 1952, turning professional after the 1936 season. As a professional he played for several teams in both Yorkshire and Staffordshire leagues, as well as making single appearances for Lancashire League teams Nelson in 1953 and Burnley in 1956. During World War II Bulcock served in the British Army and played a number of wartime cricket matches for services teams as well as for Derbyshire and Nottinghamshire teams. His son Brian Bulcock later played for Colne CC, father and son playing together in a match during the 1952 season. He died at Colne in 2001 aged 88.)
- John Bullough (1914–1919)
- Joe Burns (2019)
- George Burrows (2020)
- William Burrows (1867–1873)
- Clifford Burton (1956)
- Henry Butterworth (1931–1936)
- Wilfred Butterworth (1875–1882)
- Jos Buttler (2014–2026)
- David Byas (2001–2002)

== C ==
- George Campbell (1866)
- Frederick Carlisle (1869)
- Edmund Chadwick (1875–1881)
- Mark Chadwick (1983–1987)
- Albert Champion (1886)
- Shivnarine Chanderpaul (2010–2018)
- Ian Chappell (1963)
- Glen Chapple (1992–2015)
- Steven Cheetham (2007–2011)
- Mark Chilton (1997–2011)
- Jordan Clark (2015–2018)
- Charles Clarke (1905)
- Geoff Clayton (1959–1964)
- Ian Cockbain (1979–1983)
- Terence Cole (1904)
- Roy Collins (1954–1962)
- Lawrence Cook (1907–1923)
- William Cook (1905–1907)
- Noel Cooke (1958–1959)
- Fred Cooper (1946)
- Billy Copeland (1885)
- Dominic Cork (2004–2008)
- Samuel Corlett (1871–1875)
- Taylor Cornall (2021)
- Paul Coughlin (2026)
- Josiah Coulthurst (1919)
- Cornelius Coward (1865–1876)
- Frederick Coward (1867–1868)
- Michael Cownley (1962)
- Frederick Crabtree (1890)
- Herbert Crabtree (1902–1908)
- James Cragg (1908)
- Edward Craig (1961–1962)
- Walter Craig (1874)
- Ken Cranston (1947–1950)
- John Crawley (1990–2001)
- Mark Crawley (1990)
- Colin Croft (1977–1982)
- Steven Croft (2005–2024)
- Andrew Crook (2004–2006)
- Steven Crook (2003–2005)
- Frederick Crooke (1865)
- Sydney Crosfield (1883–1899)
- Gareth Cross (2005–2013)
- Jack Crossland (1878–1885)
- Henry Cudworth (1900)
- Jim Cumbes (1963–1971)
- Mark Currie (2002–2004)
- Willis Cuttell (1896–1906)

== D ==
- Ian Davidson (1985–1987)
- Tim David (2022)
- Alex Davies (2011–2021)
- Donny Davies (1924–1925)
- Harry Dean (1906–1921)
- Phillip DeFreitas (1988–1993)
- Colin de Grandhomme (2023)
- John Deighton (1948–1950)
- Nick Derbyshire (1994)
- Charles de Trafford (1884)
- Robert Dewhurst (1872–1875)
- Tom Dickinson (1950–1951)
- James Dixon (1878)
- Percy Dobell (1886–1887)
- George Dockrell (2024)
- Harold Douthwaite (1920–1921)
- Ryan Driver (2000–2002)
- George Duckworth (1923–1939)
- George Dunlop (1868) (Note: Dunlop was the son of Alexander Dunlop of Clober in Scotland and was educated at The Edinburgh Academy where he was a notable batsman. He moved to the Liverpool area and played for Cheshire in 1865. He made his only first-class appearance in June 1868 in a match against Surrey, scoring 17 runs in total. Dunlop was born at Edinburgh in 1846 and died at Crichton Royal Hospital in Dumfries in 1929 after having been hospitalised for his own safety for three years. His nephew, Thomas Dunlop played first-class cricket for Scotland in 1911.)
- Faf du Plessis (2008–2009)
- Arthur Durandu (1887)
- Jack Dyson (1954–1964)

== E ==
- Alexander Eccles (1898–1907)
- Henry Eccles (1885–1886)
- Joseph Eccles (1886–1889)
- Peter Eckersley (1923–1935)
- Cyril Edge (1936–1938)
- Harold Edge (1913)
- James Edmonds (1975)
- George Edwards (2014–2016)
- Eric Edrich (1946–1948)
- Geoff Edrich (1946–1958)
- Harold Elliott (1930)
- Jeremy Ellis (1891–1898)
- Stanley Ellis (1923–1924)
- Walker Ellis (1920–1923)
- Steve Elworthy (1995–1996)
- Farokh Engineer (1968–1976)
- Robert Entwistle (1962–1966)

== F ==
- Neil Fairbrother (1982–2002)
- Peter Fairclough (1911–1923)
- John Fallows (1946)
- Bill Farnsworth (1919)
- Harry Farrar (1955)
- Hubert Farrar (1904)
- Bill Farrimond (1924–1945)
- James Faulkner (2015–2019)
- Jonathan Fielding (1994)
- William Findlay (1902–1906)
- Dexter Fitton (1987–1993)
- Stuart Fletcher (1992–1993)
- Andrew Flintoff (1995–2014)
- Rocky Flintoff (2024–2026)
- Ian Folley (1982–1990)
- Keshana Fonseka (2024–2025)
- Graeme Fowler (1978–1992)

== G ==
- Frederick Gaddum (1884)
- Jason Gallian (1989–1997)
- Sourav Ganguly (2000)
- Gordon Garlick (1938–1947)
- Harold Garnett (1899–1914)
- Arthur Gibson (1887)
- Richard Gleeson (2018–2022)
- Peter Gooch (1968–1970)
- Antony Good (1973–1976)
- Freddie Goodwin (1954–1956)
- Francis Goodwin (1894)
- Keith Goodwin (1960–1974)
- Chris Green (2024–2026)
- David Green (1959–1967)
- Leonard Green (1922–1935)
- Richard Green (1995–2000)
- Eric Greenhalgh (1935–1938)
- Tommy Greenhough (1951–1966)
- Peter Greenwood (1948–1952)
- William Gregson (1906)
- Ken Grieves (1949–1964)
- Gavin Griffiths (2014–2016)
- George Grimshaw (1864–1868)
- Brooke Guest (2018–2019)
- Martin Guptill (2016)

== H ==
- Stell Haggas (1884–1885)
- Walter Haggas (1903)
- Charles Haigh (1879–1887)
- Alf Hall (1923–1925)
- Albert Hallam (1895–1900)
- Thomas Halliday (1925–1929)
- Charlie Hallows (1914–1939)
- James Hallows (1898–1907)
- Haseeb Hameed (2015–2019)
- Luke Hands (2025)
- Frank Hardcastle (1869)
- Walter Hardcastle (1869–1874)
- Fred Hargreaves (1881)
- George Harper (1883–1884)
- Marcus Harris (2025–2026)
- Frank Harrison (1936)
- J. Harrop (1874) (Note: Harrop played a single first-class match for the county in 1874, scoring five runs against Derbyshire. He is known to have played club cricket for Broughton in Manchester between 1964 and 1878 and for Manchester Clifford in 1884 and was educated at Bramham College in Tadcaster, but no other biographical details are known.)
- Frank Harry (1903–1908)
- Alfred Hartley (1900–1914)
- Charlie Hartley (1897–1909)
- Fred Hartley (1924–1945)
- George Hartley (1871–1872)
- Tom Hartley (2020–2026)
- Mark Harvey (1994–1999)
- Baron Harwood (1877)
- Hasan Ali (2022)
- Clifford Hawkwood (1931–1935)
- Frank Hayes (1970–1984)
- Kevin Hayes (1980–1986)
- Andy Hayhurst (1985–1989)
- Jamie Haynes (1996–2004)
- Francis Head (1868–1869)
- John Heap (1884)
- James Heap (1903–1921)
- Warren Hegg (1986–2005)
- Søren Henriksen (1985–1986)
- Joseph Hewitson (1890)
- William Heys (1957)
- Henry Hibbard (1884)
- George Hibberd (1867)
- William Hibbert (1900–1901)
- William Hickmott (1923–1924)
- William Hickton (1864–1871)
- Ken Higgs (1958–1969)
- Edward Highton (1948–1951)
- Peter Higson (1928–1931)
- Thomas Higson junior (1929–1946)
- Thomas Higson senior (1889–1923)
- Lyonel Hildyard (1884–1885)
- Rowland Hill (1871)
- John Hillkirk (1871–1877)
- Colin Hilton (1957–1963)
- Jim Hilton (1952–1953)
- Malcolm Hilton (1946–1961)
- Sid Hird (1939)
- Brad Hodge (2005–2008)
- Geoffrey Hodgson (1965)
- Gordon Hodgson (1928–1933)
- Kyle Hogg (2001–2014)
- Willie Hogg (1976–1980)
- Cecil Holden (1890)
- Michael Holding (1981)
- Gideon Holgate (1864–1867)
- John Holland (1900–1902)
- Frank Hollins (1902–1904)
- John Hollins (1914–1919)
- Edwin Holroyd (1878)
- John Holroyd (1927–1939)
- Carl Hooper (2003–2004)
- Len Hopwood (1923–1939)
- A. H. Hornby (1899–1914)
- A. N. Hornby (1867–1903)
- Cecil Hornby (1877)
- Edgar Hornby (1885–87)
- Leonard Horridge (1927–1929)
- Richard Horrocks (1880–1882)
- Bill Horrocks (1931–1933)
- Paul Horton (2003–2015)
- William Houldsworth (1893–1894)
- Gerard Houlton (1961–1963)
- Barry Howard (1946–1951)
- Kenneth Howard (1960–1966)
- Nigel Howard (1946–1953)
- Rupert Howard (1922–1933)
- Richard Howe (1876–1877)
- Theodore Hubback (1892)
- Bill Huddleston (1899–1914)
- Bennett Hudson (1886–1888)
- George Hudson (1936)
- David Hughes (1967–1991)
- Campbell Hulton (1869–1882)
- Harrington Hulton (1868)
- Matthew Hurst (2023–2026)
- Liam Hurt (2019–2022)

== I ==
- Shreyas Iyer (2021)
- Venkatesh Iyer (2024)
- Roger Iddison (1865–1870)
- William Iddison (1867–1868)
- Jack Iddon (1924–1945)
- Jack Ikin (1939–1957)
- Charles Ingleby (1899)
- Ronnie Irani (1989–1993)
- Frederic Isherwood (1881)

== J ==
- Edward Jackson (1871–1885)
- John Jackson (1867)
- Tom Jaques (1937)
- Kyle Jarvis (2013–2017)
- Sanath Jayasuriya (2007)
- Stephen Jefferies (1983–1985)
- Keaton Jennings (2018–2026)
- William Jervis (1874)
- Trevor Jesty (1987–1991)
- Henry John (1881)
- William Jolley (1947)
- Charles Jones (1876–1888)
- James Jones (1910)
- Michael Jones (2025–2026)
- Rob Jones (2016–2023)
- John Jordan (1955–1957)
- George Jowett (1885–1889)
- Junaid Khan (2011–2017)

== K ==
- Kabir Ali (2014)
- Murali Kartik (2005–2006)
- Simon Katich (2010–2013)
- Joseph Kaye (1867)
- Gary Keedy (1995–2012)
- Edward Kelly (1957)
- John Kelly (1947–1949)
- Arthur Kemble (1885–1894)
- George Kemp, 1st Baron Rochdale (1885–1892)
- Andrew Kennedy (1970–1982)
- Richard Kentfield (1888)
- Myles Noel Kenyon (1919–1925)
- Alexander Kermode (1902–1908)
- Simon Kerrigan (2008–2017)
- John Kershaw (1877–1885)
- Joseph Kevan (1875)
- Edward Kewley (1875)
- Phil King (1946–1947)
- Arthur Knowles (1888–1895)
- Gerald Knox (1964–1967)
- Brian Krikken (1966–1967)

== L ==
- Danny Lamb (2018–2023)
- John l'Anson (1896–1908)
- Oswald Lancashire (1878–1889)
- Tom Lancaster (1894–1899)
- Charles Landon (1874–1875)
- Jack Latchford (1930–1932)
- George Lavelle (2020–2024)
- Stuart Law (2002–2008)
- Geoff Lawson (1979)
- Albert Lawton (1912–1914)
- Bill Lawton (1948)
- V. V. S. Laxman (2007–2009)
- Cecil Leach (1923–1924)
- Harold Leach (1881)
- John Leach (1866–1877)
- Robert Leach (1868–1876)
- Roger Leach (1885)
- William Leach (1874–1885)
- Peter Lee (1972–1982)
- Charles Leese (1911)
- Ernest Leese (1880–1884)
- Joseph Leese (1865–1881)
- Jake Lehmann (2019)
- James Leigh (1887–1889)
- Toby Lester (2015–2018)
- Edwin Leventon (1867)
- Peter Lever (1960–1983)
- Arron Lilley (2012–2018)
- Lionel Lister (1933–1939)
- George H. Littlewood (1902–1904)
- George W. Littlewood (1885)
- Liam Livingstone (2015–2026)
- Clive Lloyd (1968–1987)
- David Lloyd (1965–1983)
- Graham Lloyd (1988–2002)
- Dickie Lloyd (1921–1922)
- Geoff Lomax (1948–1953)
- Mal Loye (2003–2009)
- Tom Lungley (2009)
- John Lyon (1973–1979)
- Nathan Lyon (2024)

== M ==
- Mitchell McClenaghan (2013)
- Nathan McCullum (2010)
- Ben McDermott (2026)
- Ted McDonald (1924–1931)
- Les McFarlane (1982–1984)
- Hugh McIntyre (1884)
- William McIntyre (1872–1880)
- Pat McKeown (1996–2000)
- Donald MacKinnon (1870–1871)
- Archie MacLaren (1890–1914)
- Frederic MacLaren (1903)
- Geoffrey MacLaren (1902)
- James MacLaren (1891–1894)
- Ryan McLaren (2017)
- K. G. MacLeod (1908–1913)
- Ken McLeod (1987)
- Roy MacNairy (1925)
- Keshav Maharaj (2018)
- Farveez Maharoof (2011)
- Sajid Mahmood (2002–2018)
- Saqib Mahmood (2015–2026)
- Gregor Maiden (2003)
- Harry Makepeace (1906–1930)
- David Makinson (1984–1988)
- Joseph Makinson (1865–1874)
- Mick Malone (1979–1980)
- Walter Marchbank (1869–1870)
- Peter Marner (1952–1964)
- Charles Marriott (1919–1921)
- Simon Marshall (2005–2008)
- Peter Martin (1989–2004)
- William Massey (1883)
- Chris Matthews (1988)
- Dudley Matthews (1936–1938)
- Glenn Maxwell (2019)
- James Mayall (1885)
- Chris Maynard (1982–1986)
- Francis Melhuish (1877)
- John Melling (1874–1876)
- Horace Mellor (1874–1875)
- Gehan Mendis (1986–1993)
- Joe Mennie (2018)
- Frank Miller (1904)
- Henry Miller (1880–1881)
- Josiah Mills (1889)
- Walter Mills (1871–1877)
- Robert Milne (1882) (Note: Milne, who was born in 1852 at Prestwich, played a single match for the county, scoring 7 not out in his only innings against Somerset in June 1882. He was the son of William Henry Milne, a Manchester cotton manufacturer, and was wealthy enough to not be required to work. He played a number of non-first class matches, including for the Gentlemen of Warwickshire between 1871 and 1878, Warwickshire County Cricket Club between 1876 and 1879, before the county had first-class status, and MCC between 1879 and 1892. He had three sons and died at Lemington Spa in 1927 aged 74.)
- Daryl Mitchell (2023)
- Arthur Mold (1889–1901)
- Dinesh Mongia (2004)
- Gary Montgomery (2010)
- Frederick Moore (1954–1958)
- Stephen Moore (2009–2013)
- Joe Moores (2025–2026)
- Tom Moores (2016)
- Edward Moorhouse (1873–1875)
- Lewis Moorsom (1865)
- Jack Morley (2020–2024)
- Danny Morrison (1992)
- Ralph Mortimer (1891)
- Ed Moulton (2020)
- Francis Mugliston (1906–1908)
- Steven Mullaney (2006–2009)
- Muttiah Muralitharan (1999–2007)
- Tony Murphy (1985–1988)
- Francis Musson (1914–1921)
- Phil Mustard (2015)

== N ==
- John Napier (1888)
- Naqaash Tahir (2012)
- George Nash (1879–1888)
- Nasir Zaidi (1983–1984)
- John Nelson (1913)
- Oliver Newby (2003–2013)
- Victor Norbury (1919–1922)
- Marcus North (2005)
- Albert Nutter (1935–1945)
- Ezra Nutter (1885) (Note: Nutter played a single match for the county in 1885, scoring 18 runs in his only innings against Derbyshire. He was born at Marsden near Colne in 1858 and died at Nelson in 1903 at the age of 44.)

== O ==
- William Oakley (1893–1894)
- Buddy Oldfield (1935–1939)
- Alfred Ollivant (1873–1874)
- Graham Onions (2018–2019)
- William Openshaw (1879–1882)
- Alan Ormrod (1984–1985)
- Timothy Orrell (1991)
- Steve O'Shaughnessy (1980–1987)

== P ==
- Septimus Palmer (1879–1880)
- Wilfred Parker (1904)
- Cec Parkin (1914–1932)
- Reginald Parkin (1931–1939)
- Herbert Parkinson (1922–1923)
- Leonard Parkinson (1932–1936)
- Matt Parkinson (2016–2023)
- Frank Parr (1951–1954)
- Henry Parr (1872–1876)
- Stephen Parry (2007–2020)
- Patrick Patterson (1984–1990)
- William Patterson (1874–1882)
- Arthur Paul (1889–1900)
- James Payne (1898)
- John Payne (1883)
- Eddie Paynter (1926–1945)
- Harry Pennington (1900)
- William Perry (1865)
- Alviro Petersen (2015–2016)
- Alfred Pewtress (1919–1925)
- Anderson Phillip (2024–2025)
- William Phillips (1904–1908)
- Eddie Phillipson (1933–1948)
- Charles Pilkington (1895)
- Harry Pilling (1962–1982)
- Dick Pilling (1877–1889)
- William Pilling (1891)
- Winston Place (1937–1955)
- Les Poidevin (1904–1908)
- Dick Pollard (1933–1950)
- Edward Porter (1874–1882)
- George Potter (1902)
- Thomas Potter (1866)
- William Potter (1870)
- Daren Powell (2010)
- Stephen Preston (1928–1930)
- Alfred Price (1885)
- Eric Price (1946–1947)
- Ashwell Prince (2009–2015)
- Luke Procter (2009–2017)
- Geoff Pullar (1954–1968)

== R ==
- George Radcliffe (1903–1906)
- Lees Radcliffe (1897–1905)
- Neal Radford (1980–1984)
- Robert Rae (1945)
- Sonny Ramadhin (1964–1965)
- Henry Ramsbottom (1868)
- Edgar Ratcliffe (1884)
- Bob Ratcliffe (1972–1980)
- Elisha Rawlinson (1867)
- William Rawlinson (1870–1871)
- George Rawstorne (1919)
- Luis Reece (2012–2016)
- Tim Rees (2002–2003)
- Bernard Reidy (1973–1982)
- Frederick Reynolds (1865–1874)
- Albert Rhodes (1922–1924)
- Cecil Rhodes (1937–1938)
- William Richmond (1868)
- James Ricketts (1867–1877)
- Wilfred Rickman (1876)
- Paul Ridgway (1997–1999)
- David Ritchie (1924)
- John Roberts (1957)
- R. S. Roberts (1872–1874) (Note: Roberts played 10 matches for the county, the only first-class matches he is known to have played, scoring 100 runs and, as a wicket-keeper, taking nine catches and making five stumpings. In James Lillywhite's Cricketers' Annual he was recorded as RS Roberts in 1873 and in 1875 described as an amateur player who was "a very good bat and field". It is possible that his first name was Richard and that he played for Accrington Cricket Club, although this is uncertain.)
- Timothy Roberts (2000–2002)
- William Roberts (1939–1949)
- Paul Robinson (1979)
- Walter Robinson (1880–1888)
- George Rogerson (1923)
- Edward Roper (1876–1886)
- Daniel Rowland (1868)
- Leslie Rowlands (1903–1910)
- Alexander Rowley (1865–1871)
- Ernest Rowley (1893–1898)
- Edmund Rowley (1864–1881)
- Vernon Royle (1873–1891)
- Frank Rushton (1928–1929)
- Thomas Rushton (1870)
- Frederick Rutter (1868)

== S ==
- Phil Salt (2022–2026)
- Lancelot Sanderson (1884)
- Richard Sanderson (1870)
- John Savage (1967–1969)
- Charles Sawyer (1884)
- Chris Schofield (1998–2004)
- James Schofield (1876)
- Frank Scholfield (1911)
- Sandford Schultz (1877–1882)
- Chris Scott (1977–1982)
- William Scott (1874)
- Joe Scuderi (1999–2001)
- Alfred Seymour (1869)
- Shadab Khan (2026)
- Darren Shadford (1994–1999)
- Ajmal Shahzad (2012)
- Jack Sharp (1899–1925)
- Marcus Sharp (1991)
- George Shelmerdine (1919–1939)
- Arav Shetty (2025–2026)
- Charles Shore (1886)
- Ken Shuttleworth (1964–1975)
- Frank Sibbles (1925–1937)
- Peter Siddle (2015)
- William Silcock (1899–1902)
- Jack Simmons (1968–1990)
- Ajeet Singh Dale (2026)
- Harry Singh (2024–2026)
- Arthur Sladen (1903–1904)
- R. Slater (1865) (Note: Slater's only first-class match was Lancashire's second match after the formation of the county club, an 1865 fixture against Middlesex. He recorded a pair. It is considered likely that he played for Longsight Cricket Club and Bolton Cricket Club, but no other biographical details are known.)
- J. Smalley (1869) (Note: Smalley played twice for Lancashire in 1869, recording a pair in his first match against Surrey in May before scoring 7 and 17 against Sussex in August. He is known to have played for Enfield Cricket Club between 1869 and 1886 as an amateur, usually keeping wicket, but no other biographical details are known.)
- Michael Smethurst (1998–2002)
- Alfort Smith (1867–1871)
- Arthur Smith (1886–1895)
- Charles Smith (1893–1902)
- Colin Stansfield Smith (1951–1957)
- Donald Smith (1951–1952)
- John Smith (1865–1869)
- Reginald Smith (1889–1893)
- Sidney Smith (1952–1956)
- Thomas Smith (1867)
- Tom Smith (2005–2016)
- Ken Snellgrove (1965–1974)
- Gary Speak (1981–1985)
- Nick Speak (1986–1996)
- Helm Spencer (1914)
- Archibald Spooner (1906–1909)
- Reggie Spooner (1899–1921)
- Kenneth Standring (1955–1959)
- Mitchell Stanley (2024–2026)
- Henry Stanning (1906–1909)
- John Stanning (1900–1904)
- John Stanworth (1983–1994)
- Brian Statham (1950–1968)
- Michael Staziker (1970)
- A. G. Steel (1877–1893)
- Douglas Steel (1876–1887)
- Ernest Steel (1884–1903)
- Harold Steel (1883–1896)
- Frederick Stephenson (1875–1877)
- Wilfred Stoddart (1898–1899)
- Donald Stone (1949–1950)
- Enoch Storer (1865–1878)
- Frank Sugg (1887–1899)
- John Sullivan (1963–1976)
- Washington Sundar (2022)
- Iain Sutcliffe (2003–2008)
- Richard Sutcliffe (1978)
- Luke Sutton (2006–2010)
- Ollie Sutton (2024–2026)
- Alec Swann (2001–2004)
- Samuel Swire (1864–1868)
- Andrew Symonds (2005)

== T ==
- Roy Tattersall (1948–1960)
- Roger Tattersall (1971)
- Frank Taylor (1874–1888)
- Fred Taylor (1920–1922)
- James Taylor (1871–1873)
- Malcolm Taylor (1924–1931)
- Robert Taylor (1898)
- Timothy Taylor (1981–1982)
- Kevan Tebay (1961–1963)
- Alfred Teggin (1886)
- Hector Tennent (1865–1870)
- William Tennent (1867)
- Alan Thomas (1966)
- Richard Thomas (1894–1902)
- Greg Thompson (2005)
- Harry Thornber (1874)
- Sidney Tindall (1894–1898)
- Alfred Tinsley (1890–1895)
- Henry Tinsley (1894–1896)
- Stephen Titchard (1989–1998)
- Enoch Tranter (1875–1876)
- Geoffrey Trim (1975–1980)
- Ashton Turner (2025)
- John Turner (2025)
- Ernest Tyldesley (1909–1936)
- Harry Tyldesley (1914–1922)
- James Tyldesley (1910–1922)
- Johnny Tyldesley (1895–1925)
- Dick Tyldesley (1919–1931)
- William Tyldesley (1908–1914)

== U ==
- James Unsworth (1871)
- Usman Khawaja (2014)

== V ==
- David van der Knaap (1967)
- David Varey (1984–1987)
- Dane Vilas (2017–2023)
- Lou Vincent (2008)

== W ==
- Ernest Wadsworth (1871–1879)
- Neil Wagner (2016)
- Roger Walker (1874–1879)
- Henry Wall (1877)
- Thomas Wall (1864–1868)
- William Wall (1877)
- Mark Wallwork (1982)
- George Walsh (1874–1879)
- Matthew Walton (1867)
- Leslie Warburton (1929–1938)
- Albert Ward (1889–1904)
- Frank Ward (1884–1896)
- Michael Ward (1991)
- Charles Wardle (1867–1872)
- Cyril Washbrook (1933–1959)
- Wasim Akram (1988–1998)
- Stuart Waterton (1990)
- Mike Watkinson (1982–2000)
- Alexander Watson (1871–1895)
- Frank Watson (1920–1937)
- Roger Watson (1982–1985)
- Mark Watt (2018)
- Sidney Webb (1899–1903)
- Fred Webster (1925–1927)
- Luke Wells (2021–2026)
- George Wharmby (1894)
- Alan Wharton (1946–1960)
- Thomas Whatmough (1871)
- John Whewell (1921–1927)
- Wayne White (2012–2014)
- Ralph Whitehead (1908–1914)
- Thomas Whitehead (1884)
- Peter Whiteley (1953–1958)
- John Whiteside (1888–1891)
- David Whittaker (1884–1888)
- Edwin Whittaker (1865–1868)
- Len Wilkinson (1937–1947)
- Will Williams (2022–2025)
- Alan Wilson (1948–1962)
- George Winder (1869)
- Barry Wood (1966–1979)
- James Wood (1956)
- John Wood (2000–2004)
- Luke Wood (2020–2026)
- Nathan Wood (1996–2000)
- Reginald Wood (1880–1884)
- Albert Woolley (1926)
- Alan Worsick (1978) (Note: Worsick's only match for Lancashire came in the 1978 John Player League against Essex, in a contest reduced to 20 overs he took 4/26 before scoring 12 not out in an unsuccessful run chase. He appeared in club cricket for Accrington over many seasons.)
- Duncan Worsley (1960–1967)
- William Worsley (1903–1913)
- Egerton Wright (1905–1910)
- Frank Wright (1864–1875)

== Y ==
- Yasir Arafat (2012)
- Calvert Yates (1882–1885)
- Gary Yates (1989–2003)
- George Yates (1885–1894)
- Mohammad Yousuf (2008)

== Z ==
- Zahir Khan (2018)

== See also ==
- List of Lancashire County Cricket Club captains
