= Alfred Ollivant =

Alfred Ollivant may refer to:

- Alfred Ollivant (bishop) (1798–1882), academic and bishop of Llandaff
- Alfred Ollivant (writer) (1874–1927), English novelist
- Alfred Ollivant (cricketer) (1839–1906), English cricketer

== See also ==
- Ollivant (disambiguation)
