= Donald Stone =

Donald Stone may refer to:

- Don Stone (publisher), DJ, publisher and businessman
- Donnie Stone (born 1937), American football player
- Donald Stone (cricketer) (born 1927), English cricketer
