= Frederick Crabtree =

Frederick Crabtree may refer to:

- Frederick Crabtree (Lancashire cricketer) (1867–1893), English cricketer
- Frederick Crabtree (Cambridge University cricketer) (1872–1951), English cricketer
