= Frederick Stephenson =

Frederick Stephenson may refer to:

- Frederick Stephenson (British Army officer) (1821–1911)
- Frederick Stephenson (English cricketer) (1853–1927)
- Frederick Stephenson (New Zealand cricketer) (1871–1944)
