= Thornber =

Thornber is a surname. Notable people with the surname include:

- Catherine Thornber (c. 1813–1894), Australian headmistress
- Harry Thornber (1851–1913), British cricketer
- Kraig Thornber (born 1961), British actor, singer and choreographer
- Richard Thornber (1867–1911), British footballer
- Steve Thornber (born 1965), British footballer
- William Thornber (1803–1885), British minister and historian
