= Whatmough =

Whatmough is a surname. Notable people with the surname include:

- Colin Whatmough (1950–2011)
- Francis Whatmough (1856–1904), English cricketer
- Jack Whatmough (born 1996), English footballer
- Joshua Whatmough (1897–1964), English linguist, professor, and writer
- Thomas Whatmough (1844–1911), English cricketer
