= Stanworth =

Stanworth is a surname. Notable people with the surname include:

- David Stanworth (fl. early 21st century), maintainer of Snafu Comics
- Jim Stanworth (1871–1955), Australian rules footballer
- John Stanworth (born 1960), English cricketer
