= Marchbank =

Marchbank is an English surname. Notable people with the surname include:

- Bill Marchbank (1887–1941), Australian rules footballer
- Brian Marchbank (born 1958), Scottish golfer
- Caleb Marchbank (born 1996), Australian rules footballer
- Jim Marchbank (1878–1959), Australian rules footballer
- John Marchbank (1883–1946), Scottish trade unionist
- Peter Marchbank, British conductor
- Walter Marchbank (1838–1893), English cricketer

== See also ==
- James Marchbanks,
