= Edward Porter =

Edward Porter may refer to:

- Edward F. Porter (1858–1915), American politician
- Edward Guss Porter (1859–1929), Canadian politician
- Edward Porter (Labour politician) (1880–1960), British Labour Party Member of Parliament for Warrington 1945–1950
- Ned Porter, Irish hurler
- Edward Porter (cricketer) (1846–1918), English cricketer
- Edward S. Porter (1848–1902), physician in Louisville, Kentucky
