= William Rawlinson =

William Rawlinson may refer to:

- William Rawlinson (cricketer)
- William Rawlinson (Commissioner)
- William Rawlinson (rugby union)
