= Samuel Swire =

Samuel Swire may refer to:

- Samuel Swire (cricketer)
- Samuel Swire (businessman)
