= Harry Pennington =

Harry Pennington may refer to:

- Harry Pennington (wrestler) (1902–1995), British wrestler
- Harry Pennington (cricketer) (1880–1961), English cricketer
- Harry Pennington (footballer) (1873–?), English footballer
