= Stephen Preston =

Stephen Preston may refer to:

- Stephen Preston (flautist) (born 1945), English flautist
- Stephen Preston (footballer) (1879–?), English footballer
- Stephen W. Preston (born 1957), American lawyer
- Stephen Preston (cricketer) (1905–1995), English cricketer

== See also ==
- Steve Preston (born 1960), American businessman and civil servant
