= Reginald Smith =

Reginald, Reg or Reggie Smith may refer to:

== Sports ==
=== American football ===
- Reggie Smith (wide receiver) (born 1956), American football player
- Reggie L. Smith (born 1962), American football player
- Reggie Smith (defensive back) (born 1986), American football player

=== Association football (soccer) ===
- Reg Smith (footballer, born 1903) (1903–after 1932), English footballer with Brighton & Hove Albion
- Reg Smith (1912–2004), English footballer and manager
- Reg Smith (footballer, born 1916) (1916–?), English footballer with Bristol City, Wolves, Tranmere

=== Other sports ===
- Reginald Smith (cricketer) (1868–1943), English cricketer
- Reg Smith (Australian footballer) (1902–1963), Australian rules footballer with Fitzroy
- Reg Smith (rugby union) (born 1948), Australian rugby union player
- Hooley Smith (Reginald Joseph Smith, 1903–1963), Canadian ice hockey player
- Reggie Smith (born 1945), American baseball player and coach
- Reggie Smith (basketball) (born 1970), American basketball player
- Reggie Smith (Northeastern Illinois basketball) (born c. 1970/71), American basketball player

== Others ==
- Reginald Allender Smith (1873–1940), British archaeologist, Keeper of British and Medieval Antiquities at the British Museum 1927–1938
- Reginald Heber Smith (1889–1966), American lawyer, recipient of the American Bar Association Medal
- Reginald Smith-Rose (1894–1980), English physicist
- R. D. Smith (Reginald Donald Smith, 1914–1985), English lecturer and radio producer
- Reginald A. Smith (Canadian politician) (born 1928), Canadian politician
- Marty Wilde (Reginald Leonard Smith, born 1939), English singer and songwriter
- Reginald Arthur Smith (fl. 1941), British author
- Reggie Smith (Texas politician) (born 1969), American politician

== See also ==
- Reg Smythe
