= Wharmby =

Wharmby is a surname. Notable people with the surname include:

- George Wharmby (1870–1951), English cricketer
- Gordon Wharmby (1933–2002), British television actor

== Fictional characters ==
- John Wharmby, role in British soap opera Hollyoaks (see: List of Hollyoaks characters (2011))
