= Victor Cannings =

English cricketer

Personal information
- Full name: Victor Henry Douglas Cannings
- Born: 3 April 1919; Bighton, Hampshire, England
- Died: 27 October 2016 (aged 97); Datchet, Berkshire, England
- Batting: Right-handed
- Bowling: Right-arm medium

Domestic team information
- Years: Team
- 1947–1949: Warwickshire
- 1950–1959: Hampshire
- 1959: Marylebone Cricket Club

Career statistics
| Competition | First-class |
|---|---|
| Matches | 285 |
| Runs scored | 2,660 |
| Batting average | 10.85 |
| 100s/50s | –/1 |
| Top score | 61 |
| Balls bowled | 55,256 |
| Wickets | 927 |
| Bowling average | 22.73 |
| 5 wickets in innings | 42 |
| 10 wickets in match | 4 |
| Best bowling | 7/52 |
| Catches/stumpings | 103/– |
- Source: Cricinfo, 11 January 2010

Victor Henry Douglas Cannings (3 April 1919 – 27 October 2016) was an English cricketer, cricket coach and colonial police officer. Born in Hampshire in April 1919, Cannings joined the Palestine Police Force in 1938 and spent World War II in its service. After the war he secured a contract in county cricket with Warwickshire, playing first-class cricket for the county from 1947 to 1949, at which point he had fallen out of favour at Warwickshire. He was signed by Hampshire in 1950 and played first-class cricket for the county until 1959, forming a potent bowling partnership with Derek Shackleton. He took 834 wickets for Hampshire, the eighth most taken by any Hampshire player. Following his retirement, Cannings took up numerous coaching roles, most prominently at Eton College, where he spent 24 years.

== Early life and war service ==
The son of Fred Cannings, a farm carter, he was born in the Hampshire village of Bighton in April 1919, where he was educated locally at Old Alresford. He moved to Farnham in his teens, where he continued his education at the Farnham West School. From there he gained a scholarship to Guildford Technical College. While studying at Guildford, Cannings played cricket for the Young Players of Surrey, a side which featured the Bedser twins, Alec and Eric. His early club cricket was played for Farnham Cricket Club. After finding employment working on a high-speed lathe, Cannings joined the Palestine Police Force in 1938, serving with them throughout World War II. While in Palestine he continued to play cricket, touring neighbouring Egypt and Lebanon, where he met many future Test cricketers. He also played football while in Palestine. Cannings returned to England in May 1946.

== County cricketer ==
=== Warwickshire ===
Following his return from Palestine, Cannings attempted to secure a contract in county cricket, having trials with Hampshire, Middlesex and Glamorgan; though he impressed Hampshire, they could not afford to offer him a contract. He was recommended by a major that he had served alongside at Nazareth to Warwickshire, who signed for Cannings for the 1947 season, with his £5 per week deal being completed at Paddington station. His made his debut in first-class cricket in the County Championship against Northamptonshire at Northampton, taking 2 wickets with his medium pace bowling. His first season with Warwickshire was a success, with Cannings taking 61 wickets at an average of 29.57, with three five wicket hauls. However, after his first season his returns with the ball were not as successful, with 16 and 9 wickets in 1948 and 1949 respectively. With competition for places in the Warwickshire side stiff, Cannings found himself largely out of the Warwickshire team by 1949, with Tom Pritchard and Charles Grove preferred over him. He left for Hampshire at the end of season, having made 53 first-class appearances for Warwickshire, in which he took 88 wickets. He also scored 755 runs, which included one half century score of 61, which was to be the only time in his career that he would pass fifty.

=== Hampshire ===
Cannings was signed by Hampshire as a replacement for veteran bowlers George Heath and Lofty Herman, who had recently retired. He made his debut for Hampshire against Middlesex at Lord's in the 1950 County Championship. He formed an opening bowling partnership with Derek Shackleton, with the two sharing six wickets in Middlesex's first innings of 103 all out. His dismissal of Denis Compton during the match was to become the first of many, with Compton becoming known as Cannings' 'rabbit'. His move to Hampshire revitalised his bowling, with him taking 83 wickets in his debut season at an average of under 25; he took three five wicket hauls, which included what were to be his best career figures of 7 for 52. Cannings continued his bowling partnership with Shackleton into 1951, with Barclays World of Cricket describing them as "already one of the best opening attacks in the country". In 1951, he took exactly 100 wickets and followed the feat up with 100 wickets or more in 1952, 1953 and 1954. He played a pivotal role in Hampshire finishing third in the 1955 County Championship, then their highest finish, with Cannings taking 94 wickets. Although he did not pass the 100 wickets in a season mark after 1954, he remained a consistent bowler for Hampshire and took over 50 wickets each season from 1955 to 1957. During his time at Hampshire, he was notable for dismissing Bill Johnston when Hampshire played the touring Australians in 1953; it was the first time he had been dismissed in sixteen first-class innings on the tour. He gained a reputation as a late match-winner, dismissing Kent's Doug Wright to secure victory off the last ball of the match when the sides met in 1955, while the following year against Oxford University, Hampshire won by one run when Cannings took the last two Oxford wickets off the final two balls of the match.

He retired in 1959, taking a benefit season which raised £3,787. Amongst the events organised for his benefit was a football match by Winchester City. His contributions to Hampshire cricket were celebrated in August 1959 with a dinner and dance at the Savoy Ballroom in Southsea. Cannings played his final match for Hampshire against Derbyshire at Bournemouth in the County Championship. In 230 first-class matches for Hampshire, Cannings took 834 wickets at an average of 21.69; he took 39 five wicket hauls and took ten wickets in a match on four occasions. His 834 wickets place him eighth on the list of most first-class wicket takers for Hampshire. As a tailend batsman he scored 1,888 runs at an average of 9.88. He had notable moments with the bat, including in 1950 when he and Charles Knott steered Hampshire from 141 for 9 to 152 all out to record a tied match, the 26th such occurrence in first-class cricket at the time. Cannings was once more involved in a tied match in 1955 against Sussex, coming to wicket with Peter Sainsbury when Hampshire were 84 for 8 in pursuit of 140 for victory. The pair guided Hampshire to 139 before the final two Hampshire wickets were, with Cannings the last man out leaving the match tied. On the debit side, Cannings in 1957 and 1958 was dismissed in six consecutive innings for a duck, equalling the world record for most consecutive ducks last suffered by William Worsley in 1907.

Cannings made additional first-class appearances in the 1950s for T. N. Pearce's XI against Essex at Chelmsford in 1952, and for the Marylebone Cricket Club against Scotland at Edinburgh in 1959. His overall first-class career saw Cannings take 927 wickets and score 2,660 runs.

== Later life ==
After leaving Hampshire, Cannings coached in the Caribbean, having previously coached during the English winter in Argentina, Pakistan, South Africa and Trinidad. While in the Caribbean in 1960, he received two letters in the space of a week offering him coaching roles at Eton College and Tonbridge School, with Cannings choosing Eton. He would coach cricket at Eton for 24 years, retiring in 1984, where he was replaced by John Rice. He coached both John Barclay and England One Day International player Matthew Fleming at Eton. After his retirement from Eton, Cannings was asked to return to coach first year pupils on a part-time basis, which he did until 1993. While coaching at Eton, he played minor counties cricket for Buckinghamshire making ten appearances in the 1960 Minor Counties Championship and two in the 1962 Minor Counties Championship. Cannings also coached in Northern Ireland for the Northern Cricket Union in April 1962. In 1963, he stood as an umpire in a single Minor Counties Championship match between Berkshire and Devon. In retirement he became a keen golfer, playing at the Army Golf Club at Aldershot.

Cannings died on 27 October 2016 at the age of 97. At the time of his death, he was the second oldest living Hampshire cricketer, behind John Manners, who was 102 at the time. Cannings was married to Joan, with the couple living in Datchet, Berkshire. They had a son, Gerry, who in February 2016 won the second largest amount to be won on the National Lottery in the United Kingdom.
