= George Radcliffe =

George Radcliffe may refer to:

- Sir George Radcliffe (politician) (1593–1657), English politician
- George L. P. Radcliffe (1877–1974), U. S. Senator
- George Radcliffe (footballer), English footballer
- George Radcliffe (cricketer) (1877–1951), English cricketer

== See also ==
- George Ratcliffe (disambiguation)
