= John Heap =

John Heap may refer to:

- John Heap (geographer) (1932–2006), English polar scientist
- John Heap (athlete) (1907–2000), English athlete who competed for Great Britain in the 1928 Summer Olympics
- John Heap (cricketer) (1857–1931), English cricketer
- John Heap (Klutter!), character
