= Roger Watson =

Roger Watson may refer to:

- Roger Watson (cricketer) (born 1964), English cricketer
- Roger Watson (academic) (born 1955), British nurse academic
