= Whewell (disambiguation) =

William Whewell (1794–1866) was an English polymath and Master of Trinity College, Cambridge.

Whewell may also refer to:

== People with the surname ==
- John Whewell (1887–1948), English cricketer
- Tim Whewell, British journalist

== Other ==
- Mount Whewell, a 2,945 m peak in the Admiralty Mountains, Victoria Land, Australia
- Whewell (crater), a crater on the Moon to the west of the Mare Tranquillitatis
- Whewell equation, an equation relating to the tangential angle of a curve
