= Gerald Hornby =

English cricketer and educator

Personal information
- Full name: Gerald Frederick Hornby
- Born: 9 June 1862; Wavertree, Lancashire, England
- Died: 9 February 1890 (aged 27); Tarporley, Cheshire, England
- Batting: Right-handed
- Bowling: Right-arm fast
- Relatives: Edgar Hornby (brother); Alan Hornby (nephew)

Domestic team information
- Years: Team
- 1882: Oxford University

Career statistics
Competition	First-class
Matches	1
Runs scored	1
Batting average	0.50
100s/50s	–/–
Top score	1
Balls bowled	36
Wickets	0
Bowling average	–
5 wickets in innings	–
10 wickets in match	–
Best bowling	–
Catches/stumpings	–/–
- Source: Cricinfo, 14 May 2020

Gerald Frederick Hornby (9 June 1862 – 9 February 1890) was an English first-class cricketer and educator.

The son of Henry Hugh Hornby, he was born in June 1862 at Wavertree. He was educated at Winchester College, before going up to Corpus Christi College, Oxford. While studying at Oxford, he made a single appearance in first-class cricket for Oxford University against the Marylebone Cricket Club at Lord's in 1882. Batting twice in the match, he was dismissed without scoring by Billy Barnes in the Oxford first innings, while in their second innings he was dismissed for a single run by Wilfred Flowers.

After graduating from Oxford, Hornby became a schoolmaster, being employed firstly at a school in Hillingdon in 1885, before proceeding to Bilton Grange in 1887. Hornby died in February 1890 at Tarporley, Cheshire. His brother Edgar and nephew Alan Hornby both played first-class cricket.
