= William Oakley =

William Oakley may refer to:

- Bill Oakley (born 1966), American television writer and producer
- Bill Oakley (comics) (1964–2004), letterer for comic books
- G. William Oakley (1937–2010), American theatrical producer-director-actor
- William Oakley (footballer) (1873–1934), English footballer
- William Oakley (Medal of Honor) (1860–1918), American soldier
- William Oakley (cricketer) (1868–?), English cricketer
- William Oakeley (MP) for Bishop's Castle in the 17th century
- William Oakeley (1635–1695), English landowner and politician
- William Edward Oakeley (1828–1912), quarry owner
- William Oakley (Better Call Saul), fictional character
