= William Richmond =

William Richmond or variants may refer to:

- William Richmond (politician) (1821–1895), New Zealand politician
- William Blake Richmond (1842–1921), English painter and decorator
- William Henry Richmond (1821–1922), American coal mine operator
- William Richmond (biochemist) (1941–2010), British biochemist and medical researcher
- William Richmond (cricketer) (1843–1912), English cricketer for Lancashire
- Will Richmond (born 2000), American soccer player
- Bill Richmond (1763–1829), British boxer
- Bill Richmond (writer) (1921–2016), American film and television comedy writer and producer
- Bill Richmond (director) (born 1958), television producer, director and editor
