= Gerald Sanderson =

English cricketer

Cricket information
- Batting: Right-handed

Career statistics
Competition	First-class
Matches	2
Runs scored	16
Batting average	8.00
100s/50s	0/0
Top score	16
Catches/stumpings	0/–
- Source: Cricinfo, 8 November 2022

Gerald Barry Sanderson (12 May 1881 – 3 October 1964) was an English first-class cricketer who played two first-class matches, these coming almost 22 years apart. He batted in only one innings in each.

His first game was for Warwickshire against London County in 1901; he was run out for nought. His second appearance, for Worcestershire against Northamptonshire in 1923, again ended with him being run out, this time for 16.

Sanderson was born in Liverpool; he died aged 83 in Westminster, London.

His father Richard had played once for Lancashire in 1870.
