= Henry Hibbard =

Henry Hibbard may refer to:

- Harry Hibbard, American politician
- Henry Hibbard (cricketer), English cricketer
