= Frank Harrison =

Frank Harrison may refer to:

- Frank Harrison (academic) (1913–2013), American academic
- Frank Harrison (cricketer) (1909–1955), English cricketer
- Frank Harrison (politician) (1940–2009), member of the U.S. House of Representatives from Pennsylvania
- Frank Llewellyn Harrison (1905–1987), Irish musicologist
- J. Frank Harrison III, American heir and businessman
- Frank Harrison, a plaintiff in the Native American voting rights case Harrison v. Laveen
