= James Edmonds =

James Edmonds may refer to:

- James Barker Edmonds (1832–1900), American lawyer and politician
- James Edward Edmonds (1861–1956), British Army officer and military historian
- James Edmonds (cricketer) (1951–2011), English cricketer
- James Edmonds (rower) (born 1938), American Olympic rower

== See also ==
- Jim Edmonds (born 1970), baseball player
- James M. Edmunds (1810–1879), politician
