= Richard Sutcliffe =

Richard Sutcliffe may refer to:

- Richard Sutcliffe (engineer) (1849–1930), Irish-born mining engineer and inventor
- Richard Sutcliffe (cricketer) (born 1954), English cricketer
- Rick Sutcliffe (born 1956), baseball player
- Dick Sutcliffe (1918–2008), animator
