= Horridge =

Horridge is a surname, once most common in Lancashire and Yorkshire. Notable people with the surname include:

- Adrian Horridge (1927–2024), Australian neuroscientist
- Roland Horridge (born 1963), English cricketer
- John Horridge (1893–1951), British Liberal Party politician
- Thomas Gardner Horridge (1857–1938), judge of the High Court of England and Wales and Liberal politician
- Leonard Horridge (1907–1976), English cricketer
