= James Schofield =

James Schofield may refer to:

- James Schofield (cricketer, born 1978), English cricketer
- James Schofield (cricketer, born 1854) (1854–?), English cricketer
- James Hargrave Schofield (1866–1938), politician in British Columbia, Canada
- James Schofield, a character in the TV series Hotel Babylon
