= George Potter =

George Potter may refer to:

- George Potter (trade unionist) (1832–1893), English trade unionist
- George Potter (politician) (1883–1945), Australian politician
- George Potter (cricketer) (1878–?), English cricketer
- George Potter (footballer) (born 1946), Scottish footballer
- George William Potter (1831–1919), builder, estate agent and surveyor in Hampstead, London
- George Richard Potter (1900–1982), British historian
- George Potter (MP for West Looe), member of parliament for West Looe
