= Gaddum =

Gaddum is a surname. Notable people with the surname include:

- Emily Gaddum (born 1985), New Zealand field hockey player
- Frederick Gaddum (1860–1900), English cricketer
- John Gaddum (1900–1965), English pharmacologist
- R. P. Gaddum (1898–1957), Tea planter in Ceylon and a member of parliament from 1952 to 1956
