= George Ratcliffe =

George Ratcliffe may refer to:

- George Ratcliffe (footballer) (1876–1944), English footballer
- George Ratcliffe (cricketer, born 1856) (1856–1928), English cricketer
- George Ratcliffe (cricketer, born 1882) (1882–1949), English cricketer
- George Ratcliffe Woodward (1848–1934), English composer

== See also ==
- George Radcliffe (disambiguation)
