= Henry Wall (cricketer) =

English cricketer

Personal information
- Full name: Henry Wall
- Born: 20 April 1852; Wigan, Lancashire, England
- Died: 13 October 1914 (aged 62); Southport, Lancashire, England
- Batting: Right-handed
- Bowling: Right-arm roundarm fast
- Relatives: William Wall (brother); Thomas Wall (brother)

Domestic team information
- Years: Team
- 1877: Lancashire

Career statistics
Competition	First-class
Matches	3
Runs scored	24
Batting average	6.00
100s/50s	–/–
Top score	15
Balls bowled	–
Wickets	–
Bowling average	–
5 wickets in innings	–
10 wickets in match	–
Best bowling	–
Catches/stumpings	2/–
- Source: Cricinfo, 18 March 2015

Henry Wall (20 April 1852 – 13 October 1914) was an English cricketer. Born at Wigan, Lancashire, he was a right-handed batsman and right-arm roundarm fast bowler who made three appearances in first-class cricket.

The son of Thomas Wall, the founder of the Wigan Observer, Wall played the majority of his club cricket for Wigan (but did briefly play for Sefton Park in 1881), with Wall making his first-class cricket debut for Lancashire in 1877 against Sussex at Old Trafford. He made two further first-class appearances in 1877 for Lancashire, against Sussex at Hove and Kent at Maidstone. He scored a total of 24 runs in his three matches, with a high score of 15.

Local parish records indicate that he was by profession a mining engineer. He died at Southport, Lancashire on 13 October 1914. His brothers, William and Thomas, both played first-class cricket.
