= William Wall (cricketer) =

English cricketer

Personal information
- Full name: William Wall
- Born: 8 January 1854; Wigan, Lancashire, England
- Died: 18 April 1922 (aged 68); Southport, Lancashire, England
- Batting: Right-handed
- Role: Wicket-keeper
- Relatives: Henry Wall (brother); Thomas Wall (brother)

Domestic team information
- Years: Team
- 1877: Lancashire

Career statistics
| Competition | First-class |
|---|---|
| Matches | 1 |
| Runs scored | 17 |
| Batting average | 17.00 |
| 100s/50s | –/– |
| Top score | 17* |
| Balls bowled | – |
| Wickets | – |
| Bowling average | – |
| 5 wickets in innings | – |
| 10 wickets in match | – |
| Best bowling | – |
| Catches/stumpings | 2/2 |
- Source: Cricinfo, 18 March 2015

William Wall (8 January 1854 – 18 April 1922) was an English cricketer. Born at Wigan, Lancashire, he was a right-handed batsman and wicket-keeper who made one appearance in first-class cricket.

The son of Thomas Wall, the founder of the Wigan Observer, Wall played his club cricket for Wigan, before making his only appearance in first-class cricket for Lancashire in 1877 against Derbyshire at Derby. Batting in the lower-order, Wall scored an unbeaten 17 in Lancashire's first-innings, but was dismissed without scoring in their second-innings by John Platts. In his capacity as wicket-keeper he took two catches and made two stumpings.

Local parish records indicate that he was by profession a collier. He died at Southport, Lancashire on 18 April 1922. His brothers, Henry and Thomas, both played first-class cricket.
