= George Grimshaw =

English cricketer

George Henry Grimshaw (26 January 1839 – 21 January 1898) was an English cricketer. He played first-class cricket for Lancashire. He was born in Audenshaw and died in Grafton, Herefordshire.

Grimshaw played club cricket with Ashton-under-Lyne from 1863 onwards. He made his first and only first-class appearance in 1868 against Marylebone Cricket Club. He scored a duck in the first innings as a lower-order batsman. Opening the batting in the second innings, he scored 11 runs.
