= Henry Tinsley =

English cricketer

Henry James Tinsley (20 February 1865 – 10 December 1938) was an English first-class cricketer, who played nine matches for Yorkshire County Cricket Club in 1890 and 1891, four games for Lancashire from 1894 to 1896, and one match for the North of England in 1890. He also appeared for Staffordshire in 1906.

Born in Welham Grange, Malton, Yorkshire, England, Tinsley was a right arm fast bowler, who took four first-class wickets at 14.25, with a best of 3 for 15 against Lancashire. He scored 122 runs at 5.80, with a highest score of 18 against Middlesex. He took four catches in the field.

Tinsley died in December 1938, in Heworth, York. His brother, Alfred Tinsley, played fifty eight matches for Lancashire.
