= Ollivant =

Ollivant is a surname, and may refer to:

- Alfred Ollivant (bishop) (1798–1882), academic and bishop of Llandaff
- Alfred Ollivant (writer) (1874–1927), English novelist
- Alfred Ollivant (cricketer) (1839–1906), English cricketer
- Charles Ollivant (1846 - at least 1902), senior member of the Indian Civil Service
- Douglas Ollivant (born 1967), American academic and military adviser

== See also ==
- Ollivant Point, the westernmost point of Saunders Island, South Sandwich Islands
