= Matt Watson (cricketer) =

English cricketer

Personal information
- Full name: Matthew John Corbett Watson
- Born: 4 April 1987 (age 39); Barnet, London, England
- Batting: Right-handed
- Bowling: Leg break

Domestic team information
- Years: Team
- 2006–2015: Buckinghamshire
- 2009–2010: Oxford UCCE

Career statistics
Competition	First-class
Matches	6
Runs scored	69
Batting average	13.80
100s/50s	0/0
Top score	22
Balls bowled	390
Wickets	4
Bowling average	67.75
5 wickets in innings	0
10 wickets in match	0
Best bowling	4/78
Catches/stumpings	1/–
- Source: Cricinfo, 4 May 2011

Matthew John Corbett Watson (born 4 April 1987), is an English cricketer. Watson is a right-handed batsman who bowls leg breaks. He was born in Barnet, London and educated at Dr Challoner's Grammar School in Amersham before studying at Oxford Brookes University.

Watson made his debut for Buckinghamshire County Cricket Club in the 2007 MCCA Knockout Trophy against Hertfordshire. He played Minor counties cricket for Buckinghamshire between 2007 and 2015, which included 17 Minor Counties Championship matches and 16 MCCA Knockout Trophy matches. Watson made his first-class cricket debut for Oxford UCCE against Worcestershire in 2009. He played a further five first-class fixtures spread over 2009 and 2010, the last coming against Middlesex.

Roger Watson, his uncle, played two first-class cricket matches for Lancashire.
