= Wilfred Rickman =

Australian cricketer

Personal information
- Born: 1849; South Yarra, Australia
- Died: 6 June 1911 (aged 61–62); Melbourne, Australia

Domestic team information
- Years: Team
- 1876: Lancashire
- 1881: Victoria
- Source: Cricinfo, 22 July 2015

Wilfred Rickman (1849 – 6 June 1911) was an Australian cricketer. He played one first-class cricket match for Lancashire in 1876 and one match for Victoria in 1881.

== See also ==
- List of Victoria first-class cricketers
- List of Lancashire County Cricket Club players
