= Don Stone (publisher) =

Don Stone is the founder of numerous long-running publications in Atlanta, Georgia; former Atlanta radio general manager (WAEC, 860AM) (1979-1994) and Savannah, Georgia WSAV-TV news weatherman (1974-1976).

Publications

- The Atlanta Christian Business Directory (since 1983)
- Atlanta Christian Magazine and E-Blast Newsletter (since 1987)
- The Georgia Tech Express sports magazine and E-Blast Newsletter (since 1989)
- The Braves Express magazine and E-Blast Newsletter (since 1991)
- Healthy Living Atlanta magazine, website and E-Blast Newsletter (since 1996)
- Football Atlanta magazine (since 1998)
- Georgia Football magazine (since 1996)
- The Stripers Express Website & E-Blast Newsletter covering the Gwinnett Stripers (AAA) team (since 2009)
- Atlanta Christian Media Group (since 1994)
- Kennesaw State Sports E-Blast Newsletter (since 2015)
- Country Music Atlanta Website and E-Blast Newsletter (Since 2018)
- Creator of
- www.AtlantaChristianWeb.com
- GeorgiaTechExpress.com
- FootballAtlanta.com
- Georgia-Football.com
- Braves-Express.com
- StripersExpress.com]
- KennesawStateSports.com
- http://www.HealthLivingAtlanta.com
- http://www.CountryMusicAtlanta.com

Formerly disk jockey (WRAJ-AM/FM Anna, Illinois 1972-1974), TV weatherman at WSAV-TV in Savannah, GA (1974-1977) and general manager of LOVE 86, WAEC Radio in Atlanta (1979-1994). Don Stone is an alumnus of Southern Illinois University (1970-1974), Meramec Community College (1968-1970) Florissant Valley Community College (1969) Missouri University (1969) and University City High School in St. Louis (1968).
