= Joseph Hewitson =

English cricketer

Joseph Hewitson (27 October 1865 – 4 December 1925) was an English cricketer active in 1890 who played for Lancashire. He was born and died in Bolton. He appeared in four first-class matches as a lefthanded batsman who bowled slow left arm orthodox. He scored 99 runs with a highest score of 56 and held one catch. He took 14 wickets with a best analysis of six for 57.
