= Paul Ridgway =

English cricketer

Personal information
- Full name: Paul Matthew Ridgway
- Born: 13 February 1977 (age 49); Airedale, Yorkshire, England
- Batting: Right-handed
- Bowling: Right-arm fast-medium

Domestic team information
- Years: Team
- 1997–1999: Lancashire

Career statistics
Competition	First-class
Matches	5
Runs scored	48
Batting average	12.00
100s/50s	–/–
Top score	35
Balls bowled	396
Wickets	9
Bowling average	50.16
5 wickets in innings	–
10 wickets in match	–
Best bowling	3/51
Catches/stumpings	–/–
- Source: Cricinfo, 10 June 2012

Paul Matthew Ridgway (born 13 February 1977) is a former English cricketer. Ridgway is a right-handed batsman who bowls right-arm fast-medium. He was born at Airedale, Yorkshire.

Ridgway made his first-class debut for Lancashire against Kent at Old Trafford in the 1997 County Championship. He made just four further first-class appearances for the county, the last of which came against Warwickshire at the Trafalgar Road Ground, Southport in the 1999 County Championship. In his five first-class appearances, he scored a total of 48 runs at an average of 12.00, with a high score of 35. With the ball, he took 6 wickets at a bowling average of 50.16, with best figures of 3/51.

Outside of the first-class game he played club cricket for East Lancashire and Enfield in the Lancashire League.
