= Ernest Wadsworth =

English cricketer (1850–1918)

Ernest Wadsworth (30 September 1850 – 7 January 1918) was an English cricketer and pipe organ builder, active as a sportsman from 1871 to 1879, who played for Lancashire. He was born in Manchester and died in Hale, Cheshire. He appeared in seven first-class matches as a righthanded batsman, scoring 69 runs with a highest score of 30 and held one catch.
