= William Houldsworth (cricketer) =

English cricketer

William Harry Houldsworth (6 April 1873 – 19 April 1909) was an English cricketer active from 1893 to 1894 who played for Lancashire. He was born in Levenshulme, Manchester and died in Flixton, Lancashire. He appeared in ten first-class matches, scoring 156 runs with a highest score of 21 and held two catches.
