= Frederic Isherwood =

English cricketer

Frederic Isherwood (13 August 1858 – 20 February 1927) was an English cricketer, who played for Lancashire. He was born in Darwen, Lancashire and died in Blackley, Manchester.

Isherwood made a single first-class appearance for the team in the 1881 season. Isherwood also worked as a draper at Longsight. Such was the significance to him of his only appearance for the county, that until the end of his life, he kept safe the letter which called him up to the top level.
