= Michael Cownley =

English cricketer

John Michael Cownley (24 February 1929 – 7 November 1998) was an English first-class cricketer, who played two matches for Yorkshire in 1952, and most unusually, two more first-class games for Lancashire ten years later.

Cownley was born near Sheffield, Yorkshire, England, and played against both Oxford University and Cambridge University for Yorkshire, then reappeared a decade later for Lancashire against the Pakistan tourists, taking 2 for 36. His only County Championship match then came against Warwickshire, in which he made his best score of 25. A left-handed batsman, he scored 64 runs at 12.80 in all games, and took three wickets with his right arm medium pace and occasional leg breaks.

He played for Yorkshire Second XI in 1951 and 1952, for Cheshire in 1961, and then for the Lancashire Second XI from 1962 to 1964.

A graduate of Sheffield University, he had also competed as an amateur light-heavyweight boxer in his youth.
