= Robert Taylor (cricketer, born 1873) =

English cricketer

Cricket information
- Batting: Right-handed
- Bowling: Right arm medium

Career statistics
Competition	First-class
Matches	3
Runs scored	7
Batting average	1.40
100s/50s	0/0
Top score	6
Balls bowled	388
Wickets	2
Bowling average	68.50
5 wickets in innings	0
10 wickets in match	0
Best bowling	1/25
Catches/stumpings	0/–
- Source: Cricinfo, 7 November 2022

Robert Joseph Taylor (born 1 November 1873) was an English first-class cricketer, who played in three matches, two for Lancashire in June 1898 and one for Worcestershire in August 1900. He also played for Lancashire Second XI between 1897 and 1899.

Taylor took two first-class wickets, both for Lancashire: his victims were Frederick Holland and Gregor MacGregor.
