= Ralph Alderson =

English cricketer (1919–1988)

Personal information
- Born: 7 June 1919
- Died: 2 April 1988 (aged 68)
- Batting: Right-handed

Career statistics
Competition	First-class
Matches	2
Runs scored	55
Batting average	27.50
100s/50s	0/1
Top score	55
Catches/stumpings	0/–
- Source: CricketArchive, 6 December 2022

Ralph Alderson (7 June 1919 – 2 April 1988) was an English first-class cricketer. He was a right-handed batsman who played first-class cricket for Lancashire. He was born in Newton-le-Willows and died in Glazebury.

Alderson began his cricketing career playing for the Lancashire Second XI in the 1946 Minor Counties Championship season. He played extensively through the 1947 and 1948 seasons, and it was thanks to his good form during the 1948 season that he was given a chance to play for the Lancashire team for the first time against Oxford University. Alderson scored a duck in the one and only innings that time and the weather permitted him to play, with Oxford University able to make just 2-2 from their first nine overs of the first innings before the match was abandoned and designated a draw.

Alderson played his first and only County Championship match for Lancashire against Kent the following year, making a half-century in the first innings with backup from team-mate Geoff Edrich. The match ended in an innings victory for Lancashire, but Alderson was never to play again for the side.

Alderson later took charge of one Second XI Championship and over 30 in the Minor Counties Championship as an umpire.
