= Leonard Parkinson =

English cricketer (1908–1969)

Leonard Wright Parkinson (15 September 1908 – 16 March 1969) was an English cricketer active from 1932 to 1936 who played for Lancashire. He was born in Salford and died in Manchester. He appeared in 88 first-class matches as a righthanded batsman who bowled right arm leg break. He scored 2,132 runs with a highest score of 93 and held 45 catches. He took 192 wickets with a best analysis of six for 112.
