= Harry Farrar =

English cricketer (1930–2020)

Harry Farrar (14 March 1930 – 2020) was an English cricketer. He was a left-handed batsman and a left-arm medium-fast bowler who played for Lancashire. He was born in Radcliffe, near Bury, Lancashire.

Farrar made a single first-class appearance for Lancashire during the 1955 season against Scotland. He bowled thirteen overs during the game, but did not bat as the game was washed out after the first day. He did not play for the first team again.

Farrar represented the Lancashire Second XI in three Minor Counties Championship games later in the season.

Farrer died in Bury, Lancashire in 2020.
