= Arthur Sladen =

English cricketer

Arthur Redman Sladen (22 July 1877 – 25 July 1934) was an English cricketer active from 1900 to 1904 who played for Lancashire. He was born in Bradford and died in Lake Side, Lancashire. He appeared in five first-class matches and bowled slow left arm orthodox. He scored ten runs with a highest score of 5 and held two catches. He took 19 wickets with a best analysis of five for 50.
