= John Hillkirk =

English cricketer

John Ritson Hillkirk (25 June 1845 – 8 October 1921) was an English cricketer active from 1871 to 1877 who played for Lancashire. He was born in Manchester and died in Cowes, Isle of Wight. He appeared in 31 first-class matches as a righthanded batsman and occasional wicketkeeper. He scored 607 runs with a highest score of 56* and held 18 catches with one stumping.
