= William Brown (cricketer, born 1866) =

English cricketer

William Brown (13 June 1866 – unknown) was an English cricketer active from 1894 to 1914 who played for Lancashire. He was born in Brierley Hill, Staffordshire; details of his death are unknown. He appeared in two first-class matches as a righthanded batsman, scoring 17 runs with a highest score of 7, and held one catch.
