= Rowland Hill (cricketer) =

English cricketer

- Born: 5 September 1851
- Died: 29 August 1912 (aged 60)
- Citizenship: India
- Occupation: cricketer

Rowland Wright Davenport Hill (5 September 1851 – 29 August 1912) was an English cricketer active in 1871 who played for Lancashire. He was born in Hajepoor, India and died in Sydney. He appeared in one first-class match as a righthanded batsman, scoring eight runs with a highest score of 5 and held one catch. He changed his name to Rowland Wright Davenport-Hill in 1877.
