= Jim Stanworth =

Australian rules footballer

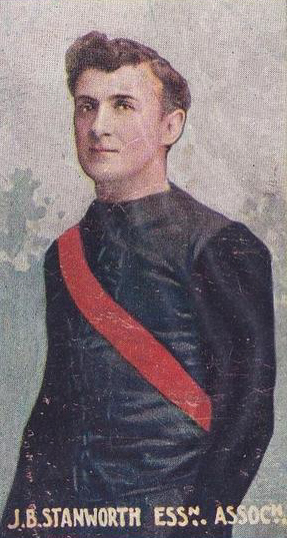
- Cigarette card of Stanworth in 1906

Personal information
- Full name: James Benjamin Stanworth
- Born: 20 July 1871; Campbells Creek, Victoria
- Died: 7 December 1955 (aged 84); Bowden, South Australia
- Original team: Queenstown

Playing career^{1}
Years	Club	Games (Goals)
1902	South Melbourne	1 (0)
- ^{1} Playing statistics correct to the end of 1902.

James Benjamin Stanworth (20 July 1871 – 7 December 1955) was an Australian rules footballer who played with South Melbourne in the Victorian Football League (VFL).
