= Michael Staziker =

English cricketer (born 1947)

Michael William Staziker (born 7 November 1947) is a former English cricketer. He was a right-handed batsman and a right-arm medium-fast bowler who played for Lancashire. He was born in Croston, near Chorley, Lancashire.

Staziker had represented the Lancashire Second XI in the Minor Counties Championship and the Second XI Championship since 1966; his first-team cricket was restricted to the month of June 1970 when he appeared in one limited-overs and two first-class games. He later played as a professional for Lancaster in the Northern League.
