= William Bower (cricketer) =

English cricketer

William Henry Bower (17 October 1857 – 31 January 1943) was an English first-class cricketer, who played for both Yorkshire and Lancashire. He played only five first-class matches, scoring 55 runs at 6.87.

Born in Bradford, Yorkshire, England, Bower made his debut and only appearance for Yorkshire in 1883, but then moved over the Pennines to appear for the Red Rose county. He made his best score of 23 in the Roses Match of 1885, one of two such fixtures he played in.

He died aged 85 in Nelson, Lancashire, in January 1943.
