= William Silcock =

English cricketer

Personal information
- Full name: William Silcock
- Born: 22 February 1868; Croston, Lancashire, England
- Died: 30 July 1933 (aged 65); Leyland, Lancashire, England
- Batting: Unknown
- Bowling: Unknown

Domestic team information
- Years: Team
- 1899–1902: Lancashire

Career statistics
Competition	First-class
Matches	6
Runs scored	82
Batting average	13.66
100s/50s	–/–
Top score	43
Balls bowled	798
Wickets	5
Bowling average	73.40
5 wickets in innings	–
10 wickets in match	–
Best bowling	2/62
Catches/stumpings	5/–
- Source: Cricinfo, 5 April 2015

William Silcock (22 February 1868 – 30 July 1933) was an English cricketer. Born at Croston, Lancashire, he made six appearances in first-class cricket.

Silcock made his first-class cricket debut for Lancashire in 1899 against Warwickshire at Edgbaston. It wasn't until 1902 that he next appeared in first-class cricket, making a further five appearances in the 1902 County Championship. He scored a total of 82 runs in his six matches, with a high score of 43. With the ball he took 5 wickets, with best figures of 2/68, although he did a distinctively high bowling average of 73.40. He later played club cricket in the Lancashire League for Church between 1903–1909.

He died at Leyland, Lancashire on 30 July 1933.
