= George Jowett =

English cricketer

George Edwin Jowett (20 August 1863 – 19 May 1928) was an English cricketer active from 1885 to 1889 who played for Lancashire. He was born in Prescot, Lancashire and died in Eccles. He appeared in 19 first-class matches as a righthanded batsman, scoring 507 runs with a highest score of 58 and holding eleven catches.
