= Herbert Parkinson =

English cricketer

Personal information
- Full name: Herbert Black Parkinson
- Born: 11 September 1892; Barrow-in-Furness
- Died: 27 April 1947 (aged 54); Barrow-in-Furness

Domestic team information
- Years: Team
- Lancashire County Cricket Club

Herbert Black Parkinson (11 September 1892 – 27 April 1947) was an English cricketer active from 1922 to 1923 who played for Lancashire. He was born and died in Barrow-in-Furness. He appeared in 15 first-class matches as a righthanded batsman and wicketkeeper. He scored 34 runs with a highest score of 8 and held 14 catches with three stumpings.
