= Colin Whatmough =

Colin Whatmough (1950 – January 4, 2011) was a creator of loudspeaker designs and the proprietor of Whatmough Monitors, an Australian manufacturer of audio equipment.

Whatmough began dissecting loudspeakers and studying the physics of sound re-production at the age of fourteen. In 1976 he founded Whatmough Monitors with the launch of the Whatmough Monitors Mk II (a large transmission line/open baffle hybrid). The Mk II was the first speaker to incorporate a lead dampening lining in its construction. In 2014, Whatmough's head office is located in Clayton, Victoria and the brand is being sold in most states of Australia.

Whatmough's speaker designs have won the company many recognition from publications such as Sound & Image and various Audiophile Websites, in both Stereo and Multi-Channel categories. Whatnough speakers have been praised for tonal accuracy, extended frequency range, good transient response, and accurate integration.

Whatmough designed speaker prototypes using computer programmes. The prototypes were then tested using Audiophile Studio Recordings of Jazz, Blues and Classical music, because of their wide variety of instruments and high dynamic range. The prototypes were then modified as many times as necessary to achieve the desired result.

== Speaker designs ==
Some of Whatmough's design innovations:

- 201/202 in 1980- First Leadlined Bookshelf Speakers
- Ondine in 1984- A pyramidal design with open rear baffle
- Focal Point in 1986- Tri-cabinet design
- Duo in 1991- An unusual design that was noted through the industry
- 301/303 in 1996- The first Floor Standing "Signature" speakers
- 502/505 in 1999- A speaker which stood the longest test of time
- Magnum in 2000- The first of the 5.1 configured speaker line up
- Classic Series in 2001- More additions to the 5.1 category
- Performance Series in 2002- The most popular series in the range
- Paragon in 2003- The flagship model, weighing 140 kg each speaker
- Synergy 2 in 2004- first of the "audiophile" sub/satellite systems
- Impulse in 2006- Introduction of an audiophile Subwoofer.
- Performance P33 in 2007- A very popular model during that time
- Signature P33i in 2009- One of the two most popular models in the current range
- Signature P15-SE in 2012- Designed by Colin and released after his death

Whatmough also kept a number of finished models, awaiting timely release.

Colin Whatmough died on January 4, 2011, leaving Kee, his widow, as proprietor of the company.
