= Wilfred Butterworth =

English cricketer

Wilfred Selkirk Butterworth (11 October 1855 – 9 April 1908) was an English cricketer active from 1876 to 1882 who played for Lancashire. He was born and died in Rochdale. He appeared in nine first-class matches as a righthanded batsman and wicketkeeper. He scored 73 runs with a highest score of 22 and held four catches with no stumpings.
