= Walter Hardcastle =

English cricketer

Walter Mitchel Hardcastle (10 February 1843 – 27 April 1901) was an English cricketer active from 1869 to 1874 who played for Lancashire. He was born and died in Bolton. He appeared in four first-class matches as a righthanded batsman, scoring 33 runs with a highest score of 11 and held one catch.
