= Edgar Ratcliffe =

English cricketer

Personal information
- Full name: Edgar Ratcliffe
- Born: 19 January 1863; Liverpool, Lancashire, England
- Died: 29 July 1915 (aged 52); Birmingham, Warwickshire, England
- Batting: Unknown
- Bowling: Unknown

Domestic team information
- Years: Team
- 1884: Lancashire

Career statistics
Competition	First-class
Matches	4
Runs scored	67
Batting average	9.57
100s/50s	–/–
Top score	28
Balls bowled	47
Wickets	1
Bowling average	43.00
5 wickets in innings	–
10 wickets in match	–
Best bowling	1/10
Catches/stumpings	2/–
- Source: Cricinfo, 18 March 2015

Edgar Ratcliffe (19 January 1863 – 29 July 1915) was an English cricketer. Born at Liverpool, Lancashire, he made four appearances in first-class cricket.

Ratcliffe played the majority of his club cricket for Sefton Park, before making his first-class cricket debut for Lancashire in 1884 against Kent at Old Trafford, in what was his only appearance for Lancashire. He made further first-class appearances for the Liverpool and District cricket team, playing against the touring Australians in 1886, and twice against Yorkshire in 1887 and 1889. He scored a total of 67 runs in his four first-class matches, with a top score of 28, as well as taking a single wicket.

He died at Birmingham, Warwickshire on 29 July 1915.
