= Mark Wallwork =

English cricketer (born 1960)

Mark Andrew Wallwork (born 14 December 1960) is a former English cricketer active from 1980 to 1982 who played for Lancashire. He was born in Urmston, Lancashire. He appeared in one first-class match as a righthanded batsman and wicketkeeper. He scored no runs and held three catches.
