= Reginald Boden =

English cricketer

Personal information
- Full name: Reginald George Boden
- Born: 13 September 1884; Ashby-de-la-Zouch, Leicestershire, England
- Died: 11 February 1966 (aged 81); Bowness-on-Windermere, Cumberland, England
- Batting: Unknown

Domestic team information
- Years: Team
- 1907: Lancashire

Career statistics
Competition	First-class
Matches	1
Runs scored	8
Batting average	4.00
100s/50s	–/–
Top score	5
Balls bowled	–
Wickets	–
Bowling average	–
5 wickets in innings	–
10 wickets in match	–
Best bowling	–
Catches/stumpings	–/–
- Source: Cricinfo, 18 September 2012

Reginald George Boden (13 September 1884 – 11 February 1966) was an English cricketer. Boden's batting style is unknown. He was born at Ashby-de-la-Zouch, Leicestershire.

Boden made a single first-class appearance for Lancashire against Cambridge University at Fenner's in 1907. Cambridge University won the toss and elected to bat first, making 366 all out. Lancashire were then dismissed for just 97 in their first-innings, with Boden being dismissed for 5 runs by Harold Goodwin. Forced to follow-on in their second-innings, Lancashire were dismissed for just 65, with Boden scoring 3 runs before he was again dismissed by Goodwin. Cambridge University won the match by an innings and 204 runs. This was his only major appearance for Lancashire.

He died at Bowness-on-Windermere, Cumberland, on 11 February 1966.
