= William Burrows (cricketer) =

English cricketer

William Burrows (31 December 1844 – unknown) was an English cricketer active from 1867 to 1873 who played for Lancashire. He was born in Preston; details of his death are unknown. He appeared in 14 first-class matches as a righthanded batsman, scoring 255 runs with a highest score of 39, and held two catches.
