= Charles Haigh =

English cricketer

Charles Henry Haigh (26 September 1854 – 15 March 1915) was an English cricketer active from 1879 to 1887 who played for Lancashire. He was born in Rochdale and died in Bollington, Cheshire. He appeared in 24 first-class matches as a righthanded batsman, scoring 435 runs with a highest score of 80 and held eleven catches.
