= George Rogerson =

English cricketer (1896–1961)

Personal information
- Full name: George Henry Rogerson
- Born: 13 March 1896; Monks Coppenhall, Cheshire, England
- Died: 29 May 1961 (aged 65); Crewe, Cheshire, England
- Batting: Right-handed

Domestic team information
- Years: Team
- 1923: Lancashire

Career statistics
| Competition | First-class |
|---|---|
| Matches | 12 |
| Runs scored | 340 |
| Batting average | 17.89 |
| 100s/50s | –/– |
| Top score | 47* |
| Balls bowled | – |
| Wickets | – |
| Bowling average | – |
| 5 wickets in innings | – |
| 10 wickets in match | – |
| Best bowling | – |
| Catches/stumpings | 3/– |
- Source: Cricinfo, 6 April 2015

George Henry Rogerson (13 March 1896 – 29 May 1961) was an English cricketer. Born at Monks Coppenhall, Cheshire, he made twelve appearances in first-class cricket.

Having played for the Lancashire Second XI since 1921, Rogerson made his first-class cricket debut for Lancashire in 1923 against Oxford University at Oxford. He made eleven further appearances in first-class cricket in 1922, playing his final match for Lancashire in the County Championship against Hampshire. He scored a total of 340 runs in his twelve matches, with a high score of 47 not out and a batting average of 17.89.

He died at Crewe, Cheshire on 29 May 1961.
