= George Winder =

English cricketer

George Alexander Winder (16 July 1850 – 1 February 1913) was an English cricketer active from 1869 to 1871 who played for Lancashire. He was born in Bolton and died in Ottery St Mary. He appeared in four first-class matches as a righthanded batsman, scoring 64 runs with a highest score of 22 and held one catch. His cricket career was ended by a shooting accident in January 1872 in which he lost his left hand when his gun exploded.

Winder was educated at Rossall School and Christ's College, Cambridge. After graduating from Cambridge he attended the Royal Agricultural College, Cirencester. He was land agent to Sir Ivor Guest and then to Sir John Kennaway.
