= Wilfred Blake =

English cricketer

Wilfred Blake (29 November 1854 – 28 November 1931) was an English first-class cricketer, who had the distinction of playing for both Yorkshire County Cricket Club and Lancashire County Cricket Club in his brief three match career.

== Biography ==
Blake was born in Embsay, Skipton, Yorkshire, and was a right-handed batsman and right arm, roundarm, medium pace bowler. He made his debut for Lancashire in the Roses Match at Fartown, Huddersfield in 1877. Batting at number 9 in Lancashire's first innings he made a creditable 26, before being bowled by Armitage in a match won by Lancashire by nine wickets. This proved to be his only game for the red rose county, and he re-appeared in 1880 for Yorkshire against Derbyshire on the same ground. He scored 16 in a match won by Yorkshire by an innings.

His final first-class game was against Gloucestershire at the Clifton College Close Ground in August 1880. He was bowled by W. G. Grace for seven in the first innings, and bowled by his brother G. F. Grace in the second for 21, as Gloucestershire ran out winners by six wickets.

Blake then vanished from the first-class scene. He was the professional at Settle, Yorkshire, in 1893 and still holds the club record for most wickets in a season - 118. He died in Burnley under the name of Wilfred Blake Uttley

Overall, he scored 70 first-class runs at an average of 17.5. He took one wicket for seventeen runs for Yorkshire.
