= Benjamin Blomley =

English cricketer

Benjamin Blomley (10 June 1879 – 12 March 1949) was an English cricketer active from 1903 to 1922 who played for Lancashire. He was born and died in Chadderton. He appeared in 70 first-class matches as a righthanded batsman and wicketkeeper. He scored 316 runs with a highest score of 41 and claimed 143 wicketkeeping victims with 110 catches and 33 stumpings.
