= Charles Benton (cricketer) =

English cricketer

Charles Henry Benton (8 January 1868 – 19 May 1918) was an English cricketer who was active from 1892 to 1901. He was born in Glossop and died in Knutsford. He made his first-class debut in 1892 and appeared in 29 matches as a right-handed batsman who bowled left arm medium pace, playing for Lancashire. He scored 663 runs with a highest score of 68 and took no wickets. In 1918, fearing his health was deteriorating, Benton killed himself with a shotgun at his home.
