= Thomas Smith (cricketer, born 1848) =

English cricketer

Thomas Smith (born 26 August 1848) was an English cricketer. He was a right-handed batsman and a right-arm medium-pace round-arm bowler who played first-class cricket for Lancashire. He was born in Glossop.

Playing his club cricket with Cheetham Hill, Smith made two first-class appearances in 1867. His first, against Surrey, saw him score twelve runs in the single innings in which Lancashire were called to bat, and saw him bowl 15 overs.

Smith's second and final appearance came as an opening batsman in a defeat against Marylebone Cricket Club, in which he bowled economically, but failed to impress with the bat.

Smith later umpired two games during the 1880 season.
