= Tom Lancaster =

English cricketer

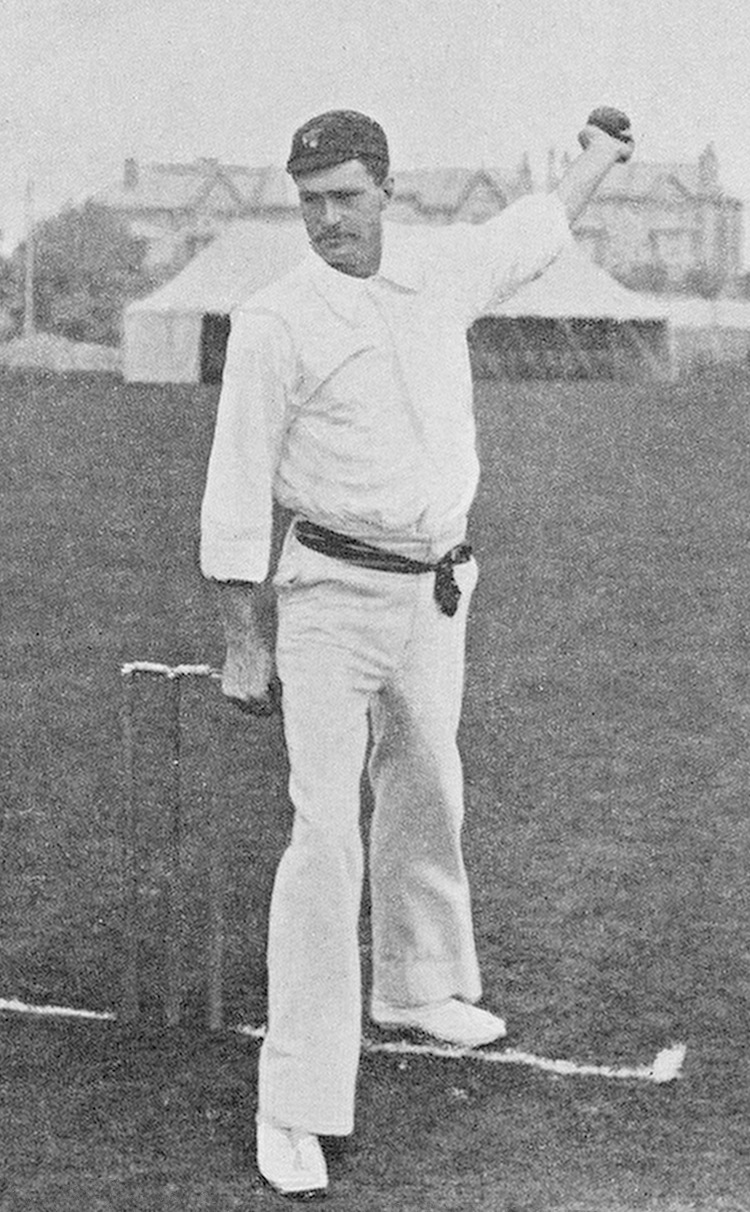

Personal information
- Full name: Thomas Lancaster
- Born: 11 February 1863; Dalton, Huddersfield, Yorkshire, England
- Died: 12 December 1935 (aged 72); Blackburn, Lancashire, England
- Batting: Left-handed
- Bowling: Left-arm slow

Domestic team information
- Years: Team
- 1894–1899: Lancashire

Career statistics
Competition	First-class
Matches	27
Runs scored	554
Batting average	19.10
100s/50s	0/2
Top score	66
Balls bowled	3,903
Wickets	66
Bowling average	22.06
5 wickets in innings	5
10 wickets in match	0
Best bowling	7/25
Catches/stumpings	6/–
- Source: CricketArchive, 12 September 2012

Thomas Lancaster (11 February 1863 – 12 December 1935) was an English cricketer who played first-class cricket for Lancashire from 1894 to 1899.
