= Wilfred Parker =

English cricketer

Wilfred Parker (23 July 1871 – 1 January 1939) was an English cricketer active in 1904 who played for Lancashire. He was born in Cheetham Hill, Manchester and died in Pendleton, Lancashire. He appeared in two first-class matches. It is not known if he was right- or left-handed but he bowled fast-medium pace. He scored 66 runs with a highest score of 40 and took four wickets with a best analysis of two for 47.
