= Arthur Knowles =

English cricketer and industrialist

Arthur Knowles (10 April 1858 – 10 July 1929) was an English industrialist and cricketer, active from 1888 to 1896, who played for Lancashire. He was born in Manchester and died in Cheshire. He appeared in five first-class matches as a right-handed batsman, scoring 83 runs with a highest score of 16, and held two catches. On 26 March 1902, he was appointed a deputy lieutenant of Lancashire. In 1896, he opened Alvaston Hall
