= Arthur Durandu =

English cricketer

Arthur Durandu (25 December 1860 – 4 February 1903) was an English cricketer who played for Lancashire. He was born and died in Liverpool.

Durandu made his only County Match appearance against Kent in June 1887 - scoring all five of his career runs in the first innings in which he played. He played one further first-class match later in the same month, against Liverpool and District, scoring two ducks, but taking two catches in the outfield.

He played rugby union for Liverpool and in 1886 represented the North in the annual North v South fixture which was seen as a trial for the England team. He played as a wing three-quarter.
