= Tom Jaques =

English cricketer

Tom Jaques (9 November 1911 – 13 August 1976) was an English cricketer active from 1936 to 1937 who played for Lancashire. He was born in Auckland, Durham and died in Denbigh. He appeared in two first-class matches as a righthanded batsman who bowled right arm medium pace. He scored four runs with a highest score of 2 and held one catch. He took one wickets with a best analysis of one for 45.
