= Francis Melhuish =

English cricketer

Personal information
- Born: May 17, 1857; Birkenhead, England
- Died: Unknown
- Batting: Right-handed

Domestic team information
- Years: Team
- 1877: Lancashire

Francis Melhuish (17 May 1857 – unknown) was an English cricketer active in 1877 who played for Lancashire. He was born in Birkenhead. He appeared in three first-class matches as a righthanded batsman, scoring 32 runs with a highest score of 13 and held no catches.
