= Walter Mills (cricketer) =

English cricketer

Walter George Mills (2 June 1852 – 6 January 1902) was an English cricketer active from 1871 to 1877 who played for Lancashire. He was born in London and died in Chorlton-cum-Hardy. He appeared in six first-class matches as a righthanded batsman who bowled right arm fast with a roundarm action. He scored 57 runs with a highest score of 26 and held four catches. He took six wickets with a best analysis of three for 52.
