= Frederick Stephenson (New Zealand cricketer) =

New Zealand cricketer

Personal information
- Full name: Frederick Charles Stephenson
- Born: 1871; Dunedin, Otago, New Zealand
- Died: 21 April 1944 (aged 72–73); Wellington, New Zealand
- Bowling: Right-arm off-spin
- Role: Bowler

Domestic team information
- Years: Team
- 1890/91: Otago
- 1891/92: Wellington
- 1895/95–1896/97: Canterbury
- 1897/98–1904/05: Wellington

Career statistics
Competition	First-class
Matches	14
Runs scored	155
Batting average	7.38
100s/50s	0/0
Top score	34
Balls bowled	1,521
Wickets	27
Bowling average	25.37
5 wickets in innings	3
10 wickets in match	1
Best bowling	7/58
Catches/stumpings	11/–
- Source: Cricinfo, 12 December 2017

Frederick Stephenson (1871 – 21 April 1944) was a New Zealand cricketer. He played first-class cricket for Canterbury, Otago and Wellington between the 1890–92 and 1904–05 seasons.

Stephenson was born at Dunedin in Otago in 1871 and was educated in the city. He worked for 50 years for Bing, Harris and Company, a soft good firm, moving from Dunedin, to Invercargill and then to Christchurch before settling in Wellington. A right-arm off-spin bowler, he made his senior representative debut in January 1891, playing for Otago against Canterbury at Christchurch. During the following season he played one first-class match for Wellington and between 1893–94 and 1894–95 played other matches for Southland before the team held first-class status.

After moving to Christchurch for work, he played for Canterbury during the 1895–96 and 1896–97 seasons, before moving to play for Wellington. In 14 first-class matches Stephenson took 27 wickets. His best bowling figures were 7 for 58 (all bowled) and 5 for 28 in Wellington's loss to Canterbury in 1902–03.

As well as cricket, Stephenson played rugby union. He and his wife had two sons and an adopted daughter. He died at Wellington in April 1944.
