= Thomas Potter (cricketer) =

English cricketer (1844–1909)

Thomas Owen Potter (10 September 1844 – 27 April 1909) was an English cricketer active in 1866 who played for Lancashire. He was born in Calcutta and died in Hoylake. He appeared in one first-class match and scored 39 runs with a highest score of 39.
