= Dudley Matthews =

English cricketer

Dudley Muir Matthews (11 September 1916 – 3 December 1968) was an English cricketer active from 1936 to 1938 who played for Lancashire. He was born in Rainhill and died in Bangkok. He appeared in seven first-class matches as a lefthanded batsman, scoring 130 runs with a highest score of 46 and held one catch.
