= Michael Ward (cricketer) =

English cricketer

Michael John Paul Ward (born 12 September 1971) was an English cricketer. He was a right-handed batsman and a right-arm off-break bowler. He was born in Oldham, Lancashire.

Ward made one first-class cricketing appearance for Lancashire against Oxford University during the 1991 season.

Ward continued to represent Lancashire's Second XI until the end of the 1991 season. During 1996, he made two Minor Counties appearances for Norfolk, as well as an appearance in the first round of the NatWest Trophy. However, he made no impact with the bat in the competition, falling LBW to the bowling of one-time Test cricketer John Stephenson.
