= Thomas Rushton =

English cricketer (1845–1903)

Thomas Henry Rushton (14 May 1845 – 1 July 1903) was an English cricketer active in 1870 who played for Lancashire. He was born in Horwich and died in Garstang. He appeared in one first-class match, scoring seven runs.
