= Hector Tennent =

Australian cricketer

Hector Norman Tennent (6 April 1842 – 19 April 1904) was an Australian cricketer active from 1865 to 1878 who played for Lancashire. He was born in Hobart and died in Westminster. He appeared in 19 first-class matches as a righthanded batsman who scored 344 runs with a highest score of 45 not out.
