= Robert Rae (cricketer) =

English cricketer (1912–1981)

Robert Burns Rae (23 July 1912 – 1981) was an English first-class cricketer active 1934–1947 who played for Lancashire. He was born in Littleborough; died in Ulladulla, New South Wales. He was a right-handed batsman and a right-arm fast bowler. Rae was a Second XI player at Lancashire and appeared only once for the first team. That was in the 1945 Hedley Verity memorial match against Yorkshire at Bradford Park Avenue and, in his sole first-class innings, he scored 74 runs.
