= George Bigg =

English cricketer

George Bigg (24 July 1861 – 27 October 1931) was an English cricketer who played for Lancashire. He was born and died in Barrow-in-Furness.

Bigg made just one first-class appearance, for Lancashire against Derbyshire. In the only innings in which he batted, he scored 16 runs from the lower order. He also recorded a bowling analysis of 1–13.
