= William Heys =

English cricketer

William Heys (19 February 1931 – 21 May 2016) was an English cricketer active from 1955 to 1958 who played for Lancashire. He was born in Oswaldtwistle, Lancashire. He appeared in five first-class matches as a righthanded batsman and wicketkeeper. He scored 74 runs with a highest score of 46 and held five catches with three stumpings.
