= Gary Speak =

English cricketer

Personal information
- Full name: Gary John Speak
- Born: 26 April 1962 (age 64); Chorley, Lancashire, England
- Batting: Right-handed
- Bowling: Right-arm fast-medium

Domestic team information
- Years: Team
- 1981–1982: Lancashire

Career statistics
Competition	First-class
Matches	5
Runs scored	27
Batting average	13.50
100s/50s	–/–
Top score	15*
Balls bowled	408
Wickets	1
Bowling average	230.00
5 wickets in innings	–
10 wickets in match	–
Best bowling	1/78
Catches/stumpings	3/–
- Source: Cricinfo, 14 June 2012

Gary John Speak (born 26 April 1962) is a former English cricketer. Speak was a right-handed batsman who bowled right-arm fast-medium. He was born at Chorley, Lancashire.

Speak made his first-class debut for Lancashire against the touring Sri Lankans in 1981. He made a further appearance in the 1981 County Championship against Essex. He made three further first-class appearances in 1982, against Cambridge University, Derbyshire and Surrey. In his five first-class appearances, he bowled a total of 68 overs, taking just a single wicket, having conceded 230 runs. With the bat, he scored 27 runs at a batting average of 13.50, with a high score of 15 not out.
