= Bob Bennett (cricketer) =

English cricketer (born 1940)

Robert Bennett (born 16 June 1940, Bacup) is a former English cricketer who was active from 1958 to 1968. He made his first-class debut in 1962 and appeared in 49 matches as a right-handed batsman who scored 1,814 runs with a highest score of 112.

In 1973 he was elected to the Lancashire County Cricket Club Committee, on which he served for over 30 years. As Chairman between 1987 and 1997, the Club enjoyed one of its most successful periods winning several "One Day" trophies.

He was also involved with the National game as a Tour Manager starting in 1990 when he embarked with the England "A" team to Kenya and Zimbabwe.

Then a second "A" tour to Pakistan and Sri Lanka the following winter at a time of great international tension in the Middle East The Gulf War forced the team to leave Pakistan after less than three weeks, moving ahead of schedule to Sri Lanka.

A full England tour to New Zealand and the World Cup in 1992 followed. The team was captained by Graham Gooch and his leadership helped take England to the World Cup Final in Melbourne. Pakistan won the final in a tournament that has the reputation of being one of the very best in the history of One Day Internationals.

The tour to India the next winter proved a quite different challenge. An airline pilots strike meant the team only travelled once on schedule. Long train journeys, several over night, caused all sorts of problems. A severe chest infection ran for weeks and hit the majority of the team at some point. Compared to the previous winter, which had been a success, this tour whilst interesting and challenging proved to be much less successful.

Another "A" tour to South Africa followed and visits to three Townships were a highlight and also ground breaking at that time.

A final tour to the West Indies with Michael Atherton as Captain in 1998 was Bennett's last trip as Tour Manager. The first Test Match was abandoned within an hour due to an unfit pitch, so the touring party were quickly moved to Trinidad where two Test matches were played back to back. West Indies won the Test Series by three matches to one.
