= John I'Anson =

English cricketer

John I'Anson (26 October 1868 – 14 September 1936) was an English cricketer active from 1896 to 1908 who played for Lancashire. He was born in Scorton, North Yorkshire and died in Chester. He appeared in 57 first-class matches as a righthanded batsman who bowled right arm fast medium pace. He scored 986 runs with a highest score of 110* and held 29 catches. He took 148 wickets with a best analysis of seven for 31.
