= James Heap =

English cricketer

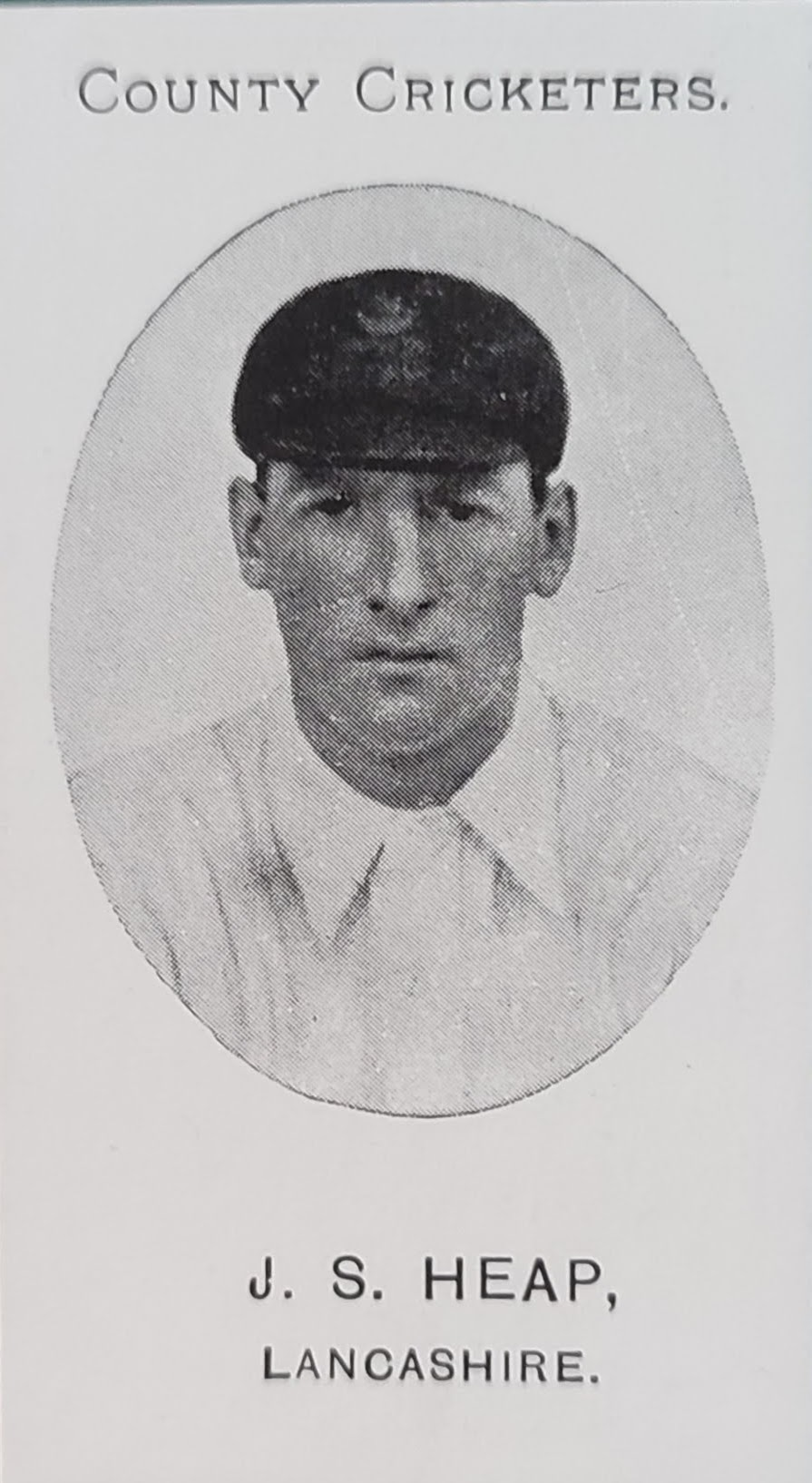
- James Heap from a collection of English county cricketers cigarette cards

Personal information
- Full name: James Sutcliffe Heap
- Born: 12 August 1882; Burnley, Lancashire, England
- Died: 30 January 1951 (aged 68); Stoneclough, Bolton, Lancashire, England
- Batting: Left-handed
- Bowling: Slow left-arm orthodox

Domestic team information
- Years: Team
- 1903–1921: Lancashire

Career statistics
Competition	First-class
Matches	210
Runs scored	5,146
Batting average	18.98
100s/50s	1/27
Top score	132 not out
Balls bowled	23,458
Wickets	412
Bowling average	23.08
5 wickets in innings	25
10 wickets in match	5
Best bowling	9/43
Catches/stumpings	76/–
- Source: Cricinfo, 23 August 2023

James Sutcliffe Heap (12 August 1882 – 30 January 1951) was an English cricketer who played for Lancashire from 1903 to 1921 after graduating from the Lancashire League where he played for his hometown club, Lowerhouse.

Heap appeared in 210 first-class matches as a slow left-arm orthodox spin bowler who batted left-handed in the lower or middle order. He had a "beautiful natural action". He often suffered from severe lumbago, which affected his bowling. Neville Cardus wrote:

James Heap was a slow left-hand spinner with a charming action, a little jump, right hand pointing to heaven, side to the batsman, then a "swing-through" of easeful rhythm. On a "sticky" wicket he could bowl as dangerously as Rhodes himself; but his misfortune was lumbago.

Heap scored 5,146 runs at an average of 18.98 with a highest score of 132 not out and held 74 catches. He took 412 wickets with a best analysis of 9 for 43 (after 5 for 50 in the first innings) against Northamptonshire at Northampton in 1910. He saved some of his best performances for the Roses Match – in 1909 he recorded match figures of 11 for 95 at Bradford, and 11 for 39 at Manchester in the first match of the 1913 season. Lancashire organised a benefit for him in his final season, 1921, which realised £1,804.
