= Gerald Knox =

English cricketer

Gerald Keith Knox (born 22 April 1937) is a former English cricketer active from 1957 to 1967 who played for Lancashire. He was born in North Shields. He appeared in 52 first-class matches as a righthanded batsman who bowled right arm medium pace. He scored 1,698 runs with a highest score of 108, one of three first-class centuries, and held 38 catches. He took two wickets with a best analysis of one for 10.
