= Frederic MacLaren =

English cricketer (1875–1952)

Frederic Grahame MacLaren (5 November 1875 – 10 May 1952) was an English cricketer active from 1903 to 1910 who played for Lancashire. He was born in Worsley and died in Bowdon. He appeared in one first-class match, scoring 19 runs with a highest score of 19.
