= Richard Blackstock =

English cricketer

Personal information
- Full name: Richard Blackstock
- Born: 13 July 1838; Oxton, Birkenhead, Cheshire, England
- Died: 3 July 1893 (aged 54); Oxton, Cheshire, England
- Batting: Right-handed
- Bowling: Unknown
- Role: Wicket-keeper

Domestic team information
- Years: Team
- 1865: Lancashire

Career statistics
| Competition | First-class |
|---|---|
| Matches | 4 |
| Runs scored | 154 |
| Batting average | 22.00 |
| 100s/50s | –/– |
| Top score | 47 |
| Balls bowled | 36 |
| Wickets | 1 |
| Bowling average | 11.00 |
| 5 wickets in innings | – |
| 10 wickets in match | – |
| Best bowling | 1/11 |
| Catches/stumpings | 3/1 |
- Source: Cricinfo, 9 November 2013

Richard Blackstock (13 July 1838 – 3 February 1893) was an English cricketer active in first-class cricket, making four appearances in the 1850s and 1860s. Born at Oxton, Birkenhead, Cheshire, Blackstock was a right-handed batsman who played as a wicket-keeper.

== Career ==
A club cricketer for Birkenhead Park Cricket Club, keeping wicket for the club when William Lockhart was unavailable. Blackstock made his first-class debut in 1858 at The Oval when he played for the Gentlemen of the North against the Gentlemen of the South. His next appearance in first-class cricket came five years later in 1863, when he played two matches for the North in the North v South fixture. Two years later he made a single first-class appearance for Lancashire in its inaugural first-class match against Middlesex, with Blackstock opening the batting and therefore having the distinction of being the first Lancashire batsman to face a delivery in first-class cricket. (Note: This was Lancashire County Cricket Club's debut in first-class cricket.) Across his four first-class appearances, Blackstock scored a total of 154 runs at an average of 22.00, with a high score of 47.

Outside of cricket he was a builders merchant. He died at Oxton on 3 February 1893.
