= Bennett Hudson =

English cricketer (1851–1901)

Bennett Hudson (29 June 1851 – 11 November 1901) was an English first-class cricketer, who played three matches for Yorkshire County Cricket Club in 1880.
