= William Scott (cricketer, born 1845) =

English cricketer

William Ainslie Scott (c. 1845 – 17 June 1899) was an English cricketer active in 1874 who played for Lancashire. He died in Bolton. He appeared in one first-class match, scoring 14 runs with a highest score of 9.
