= Leslie Warburton =

English cricketer

Leslie Warburton (30 April 1910 – 11 February 1984) was an English cricketer active from 1929 to 1938 who played for Lancashire. He was born in Haslingden and died in Gloucester. He appeared in eight first-class matches as a righthanded batsman who bowled right arm fast-medium pace. He scored 171 runs with a highest score of 74* and held one catch. He took seven wickets with a best analysis of three for 47.
