= Albert Woolley =

English cricketer (1902–1987)

Albert Woolley (26 September 1902 – 5 January 1978) was an English cricketer active in 1926 who played for Lancashire. He was born in Salford and died in Doncaster. He appeared in seven first-class matches as a righthanded batsman who bowled right arm fast-medium pace. He scored 61 runs with a highest score of 24 and held nine catches. He took eleven wickets with a best analysis of four for 56.
