= Ashton Club Ground =

Cricket ground in Ashton-under-Lyne, England

- Interactive map of Ashton Club Ground

Ground information
- Location: Ashton-under-Lyne, Lancashire
- Country: England
- Coordinates: 53.4890°N 2.1031°W
- Establishment: 1863 (first recorded match)

Team information
Cambridgeshire/Yorkshire	(1865)
- As of 5 September 2010; Source: profile

Ashton Club Ground was a cricket ground in Ashton-under-Lyne, Lancashire. The first recorded match on the ground was in 1863, when Ashton-under-Lyne played All England Eleven.

In 1865, the ground acted as a neutral venue when it held its only first-class match between Cambridgeshire and Yorkshire, with the match ending in a draw.
