= Leslie Rowlands =

English cricketer

Leslie Samuel Rowlands (29 August 1880 – 1 October 1947) was an English cricketer active from 1903 to 1910 who played for Lancashire. He was born in Birmingham and died in Clapham Common. He appeared in seven first-class matches as a righthanded batsman who bowled right arm medium pace. He scored 33 runs with a highest score of 9 and held two catches. He took 18 wickets with a best analysis of four for 29.
