= Richard Howe (cricketer) =

British cricketer (1853–1914)

Richard Howe (17 February 1853 – 21 January 1914) was an English cricketer active from 1876 to 1877 who played for Lancashire. He was born in Denton, Manchester and died in Alderley Edge, Cheshire. He appeared in four first-class matches as a righthanded batsman, scoring 38 runs with a highest score of 14 and held four catches.
