= William Potter (cricketer, born 1847) =

English cricketer (1847–1920)

William Henry Potter (20 August 1847 – 10 April 1920) was an English cricketer active in 1870 who played for Lancashire. He was born in Gufsey, India, and died in Borehamwood. He appeared in one first-class match, scoring 23 runs with a highest score of 12.
