= Frederick Crabtree (Cambridge University cricketer) =

English cricketer

Frederick Lane Crabtree (13 September 1872 – 19 August 1951) was an English first-class cricketer active 1894–98 who played for Cambridge University. He was born in Darlington and died in Canterbury. He appeared in three first-class matches.
