= Charles Wardle (cricketer) =

English cricketer

Charles Wardle (20 February 1836 – 10 August 1907) was an English cricketer active from 1867 to 1872 who played for Lancashire. He was born and died in Arnold, Nottinghamshire. He appeared in three first-class matches as a righthanded batsman, scoring 25 runs with a highest score of 7* and held four catches.
