= Paul Robinson (cricketer) =

South African cricketer (1956–2013)

Paul Andrew Robinson (16 July 1956 – 6 August 2013) was a South African cricketer active from 1977 to 1988 who played for Northern Transvaal and Lancashire. He was born in Boksburg, Transvaal and died in Durban. He appeared in 34 first-class matches as a righthanded batsman who bowled right arm fast medium pace. He scored 567 runs with a highest score of 49 and held ten catches. He took 86 wickets with a best analysis of six for 46.
