= Albert Rhodes (Lancashire cricketer) =

English cricketer

Personal information
- Full name: Albert Rhodes
- Born: 9 April 1889; Saddleworth, England
- Died: 10 March 1970 (aged 80); Blackpool, Lancashire, England
- Batting: Right-handed
- Bowling: Right-arm slow-medium

Domestic team information
- Years: Team
- 1922–1924: Lancashire

Career statistics
Competition	First-class
Matches	17
Runs scored	382
Batting average	17.36
100s/50s	–/2
Top score	70
Balls bowled	1,097
Wickets	15
Bowling average	31.66
5 wickets in innings	–
10 wickets in match	–
Best bowling	2/24
Catches/stumpings	9/–
- Source: Cricinfo, 13 August 2012

Albert Rhodes (9 April 1889 – 10 March 1970) was an English cricketer. Rhodes was a right-handed batsman who bowled right-arm slow-medium. He was born in Saddleworth in the former West Riding of Yorkshire.

Rhodes made his first-class debut for Lancashire against Warwickshire at Edgbaston in the 1922 County Championship. He made sixteen further first-class appearances for the county, the last of which came against Essex at the County Ground, Leyton, in the 1924 County Championship. In his seventeen first-class appearances, Rhodes scored 382 runs at an average of 17.36, with a high score of 70. One of two half centuries he made, this score came against the touring West Indians in 1923. With the ball, he took 15 wickets at a bowling average of 31.66, with best figures of 2/24.

He also played cricket for Haslingden in the Lancashire League, who played for from 1919 to 1935. He died at Blackpool, Lancashire, on 10 March 1970.
