= Frank Rushton =

English cricketer (1906–1975)

Frank Rushton (21 April 1906 – 15 October 1975) was an English cricketer active from 1928 to 1929 who played for Lancashire. He was born and died in Bolton. He appeared in six first-class matches as a righthanded batsman who bowled right arm fast-medium pace. He scored 59 runs with a highest score of 28 and held two catches. He took ten wickets with a best analysis of four for 30.
