= Edward Moorhouse =

English cricketer

Edward Moorhouse (11 April 1851 – 10 March 1927) was an English cricketer active from 1873 to 1875 who played for Lancashire. He was born in Haslingden and died in Chorlton-cum-Medlock. He appeared in five first-class matches as a righthanded batsman and wicketkeeper. He scored 75 runs with a highest score of 34 and held eight catches with three stumpings.
