= Thomas Whitehead (cricketer) =

English cricketer (1853–1937)

Thomas Whitehead (31 March 1853 – 2 November 1937) was an English cricketer active in 1884 who played for Lancashire. He was born and died in Preston. He appeared in one first-class match, scoring eight runs with a highest score of 8.
