= Thomas Bradbury (cricketer) =

English cricketer

Thomas Thornhill Bradbury (20 November 1859 – 23 August 1917) was an English cricketer active in 1880 who played for Lancashire. He was born in Haydock and died in Brighton. He appeared in one first-class match, scoring six runs and held one catch.
