= Ben Barrell =

English cricketer

Personal information
- Full name: Ben Barrell
- Born: 14 May 1885; Orford, Suffolk, England
- Died: 14 July 1969 (aged 84); Bootle, England
- Batting: Right-handed
- Bowling: Right-arm fast-medium

Domestic team information
- Years: Team
- 1911–1923: Lancashire
- First-class debut: 19 June 1911 Lancashire v Indians
- Last First-class: 11 July 1923 Lancashire v Essex

Career statistics
| Competition | First-class |
|---|---|
| Matches | 3 |
| Runs scored | 45 |
| Batting average | 22.50 |
| 100s/50s | 0/0 |
| Top score | 25 |
| Balls bowled | 378 |
| Wickets | 9 |
| Bowling average | 15.00 |
| 5 wickets in innings | 0 |
| 10 wickets in match | 0 |
| Best bowling | 3–10 |
| Catches/stumpings | 1/– |
- Source: , 1 April 2012

Ben Barrell (14 May 1885 – 14 July 1969) was an English first-class cricketer who represented Lancashire. A right-handed batsman and right-arm fast-medium bowler, he played three first-class matches for the county between 1911 and 1923.

Barrell made his Lancashire debut on 19 June 1911 against an Indian representative side as part of the Indian team's tour of England and took three wickets for 10 runs. Two months later he was selected to play his first County Championship match as Lancashire recorded an innings victory against Hampshire. Barrell next played for the county almost 12 years later, making his final first-class appearance in the draw with Essex in July 1923. In this match he recorded his highest score of 25.

Aside from representing Lancashire, Barrell also played in the Minor Counties Championship for Cheshire and played club cricket for Enfield.
