= Roger Tattersall =

English cricketer (1952–2020)

Personal information
- Full name: Roger Hartley Tattersall
- Born: 12 March 1952; Nelson, Lancashire, England
- Died: 24 April 2020 (aged 68); Trawden, Lancashire, England
- Batting: Left-handed
- Bowling: Left-arm medium

Domestic team information
- Years: Team
- 1971: Lancashire

Career statistics
Competition	First-class	List A
Matches	2	1
Runs scored	–	1
Batting average	–	–
100s/50s	–/–	–/–
Top score	–	1*
Balls bowled	294	36
Wickets	1	–
Bowling average	219.00	–
5 wickets in innings	–	–
10 wickets in match	–	–
Best bowling	1/44	–
Catches/stumpings	–/–	–/–
- Source: Cricinfo, 16 June 2012

Roger Tattersall (12 March 1952 – 24 April 2020) was an English cricketer. Tattersall was a left-handed batsman who bowled left-arm medium pace. He was born at Nelson, Lancashire, and was educated at The Leys School.

Tattersall made two first-class appearances for Lancashire in 1971, against Warwickshire at Old Trafford, and Sussex at the County Ground, Hove. He wasn't called upon to bat in either match, while with the ball he took just one wicket. In that same season he also made a single List A appearance against Middlesex at Lord's in the John Player league, scoring one run and going wicketless with the ball.

He also played in the Lancashire League for Nelson.
