= Richard Thornber =

English footballer

Personal information
- Full name: Richard Thornber
- Date of birth: June 1866
- Place of birth: Darwen, England
- Date of death: 1911 (aged 44–45)
- Position: Half back

Senior career*
| Years | Team | Apps | (Gls) |
| 1891–1892 | Darwen | 18 | (3) |
| 1892–1893 | Preston North End | 3 | (0) |
- * Club domestic league appearances and goals

Richard Thornber (June 1866 – 1911) was an English footballer who played in the Football League for Darwen and Preston North End.
