= Calvert Yates =

English cricketer

Calvert Yates (28 November 1851 – 10 June 1904) was an English cricketer who played for Lancashire. He was born in Oswaldtwistle, Lancashire and died in Church, Lancashire.

Yates made his first and only first-class appearance for Lancashire in an 1882 match against Yorkshire. He scored 28 runs with the bat in two innings.

Yates made two appearances in miscellaneous matches in August 1885, against Cheshire and Essex - in the first of which, he hit an innings of 76, the highest score amongst the Lancashire team.
