= William Perry (cricketer) =

English cricketer (1830–1913)

Personal information
- Full name: William Perry
- Born: 12 August 1830; Oxford, Oxfordshire, England
- Died: 15 March 1913 (aged 82); Thatcham, Berkshire, England
- Batting: Unknown
- Bowling: Unknown
- Role: Wicket-keeper

Domestic team information
- Years: Team
- 1865: Lancashire

Career statistics
Competition	First-class
Matches	2
Runs scored	27
Batting average	–
100s/50s	–/–
Top score	16
Balls bowled	28
Wickets	–
Bowling average	–
5 wickets in innings	–
10 wickets in match	–
Best bowling	–
Catches/stumpings	3/1
- Source: Cricinfo, 16 June 2012

William Perry (12 August 1830 – 15 March 1913) was an English cricketer. Perry's batting and bowling styles are unknown, though it is known he fielded as a wicket-keeper. He was born at Oxford, Oxfordshire.

Perry initially played for early teams representative of Oxfordshire and Berkshire, and then moved to the north-west of England, where he played for Liverpool Cricket Club. He made his first-class debut for the North against the South in 1856 at Broughton Cricket Club Ground. The North batted first, making 219 all out, with Perry ending the innings unbeaten on 11. The South then reached 46/3 in their first-innings, at which point poor weather intervened and the match ended as a draw. He continued to play for Liverpool Cricket Club as an effective bowler over the next decade, before being selected to play in Lancashire's inaugural first-class match against Middlesex at Old Trafford in 1865. Winning the toss and electing to bat first, Lancashire made 243 all out, with Perry being dismissed for 16 by William Catling. In response, Middlesex made the same total in their first-innings, during which Perry took two catches and made a single stumping while keeping-wicket, as well as bowling seven overs. In its second-innings, Lancashire were dismissed for 178 all out, with Perry dismissed for a duck by Vyell Walker. Chasing 199 for victory, Middlesex were dismissed for 116, with Perry taking a single catch during their chase.

Perry also stood as an umpire in four first-class matches between 1859 and 1866. He died at Thatcham, Berkshire, on 15 March 1913.
