= Edmund Chadwick =

English cricketer

Personal information
- Full name: Edmund Leach Chadwick
- Born: 31 August 1847
- Died: 6 August 1918 (aged 70)

Edmund Leach Chadwick (31 August 1847 – 6 August 1918) was an English cricketer who played for Lancashire County Cricket Club. He appeared in 13 first-class matches as a right handed batsman, scoring 254 runs with a highest score of 42, and held two catches.

Chadwick was born at Rochdale in 1847, the son of Thomas Chadwick, a woolen manufacturer from London who had been born in Scotland. He was educated at Bruce Castle School in Tottenham and then at Marlborough College, although he did not play cricket for the college team. He played club cricket for the Castleton club in Rochdale, including against the touring Australian Aboriginal team in 1868 and in 1875 made his first-class debut, playing for Lancashire against MCC at Lord's.

Playing only occasionally for the county team when business allowed him to do so, Chadwick made 13 appearances for the team, with his final first-class match played in 1881. In club cricket he scored 213 runs not out in a match for Castleton in 1877. He was considered "in his day a very good batsman", although unable to establish himself at first-class level.

Professionally Chadwick established a textile manufacturing business in Rochdale. By 1901 he was manufacturing flannel cloth. He married and had at least three children. Chadwick died in 1918 at Parkstone in Dorset. He was aged 70.
