= Edward Bleackley =

English cricketer

Edward Overall Bleackley (10 March 1898 – 17 February 1976) was an English cricketer active in 1919 who played for Lancashire and Marylebone Cricket Club (MCC). He was born in Salford and died in Ealing. He appeared in three first-class matches, scoring 31 runs with a highest score of 21.

He was educated at Harrow School for whom he played cricket.
