= Stell Haggas =

English cricketer

Personal information
- Born: 18 April 1856; Keighley, Yorkshire
- Died: 14 March 1926 (aged 69); Oldham, Lancashire
- Batting: Right-handed

Career statistics
Competition	First-class
Matches	34
Runs scored	537
Batting average	10.95
100s/50s	0/0
Top score	43
Catches/stumpings	10/0
- Source: Cricinfo, 8 November 2022

Stell Haggas (18 April 1856 – 14 March 1926) was an English first-class cricketer, who played 31 times for Yorkshire County Cricket Club from 1878 to 1882, and reappeared in three more games for Lancashire in 1884 and 1885.

Born in Keighley, Yorkshire, England, Haggas was a right hand batsman and occasional wicket-keeper, who scored 537 runs at 10.95, with a best of 43 against Surrey, and who took 10 catches.

Haggas died in March 1926 in Werneth, Oldham, Lancashire.

His son, Walter Haggas, played two games for Lancashire.
