= Walter Haggas =

English cricketer

Walter Haggas (1 April 1881 – 14 November 1959) was an English cricketer. He was a wicket-keeper who played first-class cricket for Lancashire. He was born in Werneth, Oldham, Lancashire and died in Macclesfield, Cheshire.

Haggas made two first-class appearances for the side, within a week of each other in May 1903. He made six runs in two innings as a tail-end batsman and took three catches behind the wicket.

His father, Stell, appeared for Yorkshire and Lancashire between 1878 and 1885.
