= Hubert Farrar =

English cricketer

Hubert Lister Farrar (2 April 1881 – 4 July 1939) was an English cricketer. He was a right-handed batsman who played first-class cricket for Lancashire. He was born in Broughton Park, Salford and died in Bowdon, Altrincham.

Farrar made a single first-class appearance, against a team of touring South Africans in 1904. He scored 25 runs in the first innings of the match, but only three in the second, and he was never chosen again for the Lancashire first team.

Farrar made a handful of Second XI appearances between 1903 and 1905.
