= Geoffrey Trim =

English cricketer (born 1956)

Geoffrey Edward Trim (born 6 April 1956) is a former English cricketer active from 1974 to 1980 who played for Lancashire. He was born in Openshaw, Manchester. He appeared in 15 first-class matches as a righthanded batsman who bowled right arm leg break. He scored 399 runs with a highest score of 91 and held ten catches. He took no wickets with a best analysis of none for 13.
