= George Shelmerdine =

English cricketer

George Owen Shelmerdine (7 September 1899 – 31 July 1967) was an English cricketer active from 1919 to 1925 who played for Lancashire and Cambridge University. He was born in Pendleton and died in Brighton. He appeared in 53 first-class matches as a righthanded batsman who bowled right arm medium-fast pace. He scored 1,614 runs with a highest score of 105 and held 19 catches. He took three wickets with a best analysis of two for 24.
