= Charles Shore =

English cricketer

Charles Shore (21 November 1858 – 5 June 1912) was an English cricketer active from 1881 to 1887 who played for Lancashire, Liverpool and District and Nottinghamshire. He was born and died in Sutton-in-Ashfield. He appeared in 13 first-class matches as a lefthanded batsman who bowled slow left arm orthodox. He scored 159 runs with a highest score of 42* and held nine catches. He took 41 wickets with a best analysis of five for 36.
