= Percy Dobell =

English cricketer

Percy Dobell (29 April 1864 – 5 January 1903) was an English cricketer active from 1886 to 1887 who played for Lancashire. He was born in Huyton and died in Liverpool. He appeared in ten first-class matches as a righthanded batsman, scoring 142 runs with a highest score of 28, and held four catches. In 1903, Dobell killed himself with a self-inflicted gunshot wound to the head from a revolver inside his offices.
