= Richard Thomas (cricketer, born 1867) =

English cricketer (1867–1918)

Richard Thomas (15 July 1867 – 18 December 1918) was an English cricketer active from 1894 to 1902 who played for Lancashire. He was born in Wales and died in Oldham. He appeared in 20 first-class matches as a righthanded batsman and wicketkeeper. He scored 60 runs with a highest score of 17 and held 22 catches with eight stumpings.
