= Kenneth Bowling =

English cricketer

Kenneth Bowling (10 November 1929 – 7 December 1997) was an English cricketer active from 1953 to 1956 who played for Lancashire. He was born and died in Preston. He appeared in one first-class match, scoring seven runs with a highest score of 4*.
