= William Pilling =

English cricketer (1857–1924)

William Pilling (5 November 1857 – 27 March 1924) was an English cricketer active in 1891 who played for Lancashire. He was born in Church, Lancashire and died in Manchester. He appeared in one first-class match as a wicketkeeper. He scored nine runs with a highest score of 9* and held one catch with one stumping.
