= William Brown (cricketer, born 1889) =

English cricketer

William ("Billy") Brown (17 January 1889 – unknown) was an English cricketer active from 1919 to 1923 who played for Lancashire. He was born in Accrington; details of his death are unknown. He appeared in ten first-class matches. It is not known if he was right or lefthanded, but he bowled at fast medium pace. He scored 239 runs with a highest score of 39 and held ten catches. He took 22 wickets with a best analysis of four for 22.
