= Henry Ramsbottom =

English cricketer

Henry John Ramsbottom (21 October 1846 – 9 April 1905) was an English cricketer. He was a right-handed batsman and right-arm medium-pace bowler who played for Lancashire. He was born in Enfield, Lancashire and died in Clayton-le-Moors. Despite being a middle-order batsman for Enfield Cricket Club in the Lancashire League, Ramsbottom played as an opening batsman in his only first-class game for Lancashire, though he scored just a single run in the two innings in which he batted.

Ramsbottom bowled three overs in the match, conceding 11 runs in a match which Lancashire lost by an innings margin.
