= Darren Shadford =

English cricketer (born 1975)

Personal information
- Full name: Darren James Shadford
- Born: 4 March 1975 (age 51); Oldham, England
- Batting: Right-handed
- Bowling: Right-arm medium-fast

Domestic team information
- Years: Team
- 1998: Lancashire Cricket Board
- 1994–1998: Lancashire

Career statistics
| Competition | First-class | List A |
|---|---|---|
| Matches | 11 | 12 |
| Runs scored | 120 | 3 |
| Batting average | 15.00 | 3.00 |
| 100s/50s | –/– | –/– |
| Top score | 30 | 2 |
| Balls bowled | 1,258 | 372 |
| Wickets | 23 | 11 |
| Bowling average | 42.73 | 31.63 |
| 5 wickets in innings | 1 | – |
| 10 wickets in match | – | – |
| Best bowling | 5/80 | 3/30 |
| Catches/stumpings | 5/– | 4/– |
- Source: Cricinfo, 12 June 2012

Darren James Shadford (born 4 March 1975) is a former English cricketer. Shadford is a right-handed batsman who bowls right-arm medium-fast. He was born in Oldham, Greater Manchester.

Shadford made his debut for Lancashire in a List A match against Gloucestershire in the 1994 Axa Equity & Law League. He made two further appearances in that season's competition, against Nottinghamshire and Durham. He made his first-class debut the following season against Essex in the County Championship, with Shadford making a further first-class appearance in 1995 against Surrey. He didn't appear for Lancashire in 1996, but did feature for the county in 1997, making eight first-class and eight List A appearances. However, in 1998 he made just a single first-class appearance against Essex in the County Championship, as well as making a single List A appearance against Sussex in the AXA League. It was also in 1998 that he made a single appearance for the Lancashire Cricket Board in the MCCA Knockout Trophy against Shropshire.

He left Lancashire at the end of the 1999 season. Since his debut for the county in 1994, Shadford made eleven first-class appearances for the county, taking 23 wickets at an average of 42.73, with best figures of 5/80. This was his only five wicket haul and came against Warwickshire in 1997. With the bat, he scored 120 runs at a batting average of 15.00, with a high score of 30. In List A cricket, he made twelve appearances, taking 11 wickets at an average of 31.63, with best figures of 3/30. His batting in that format consisted of three innings and was negligible.
