= Frank Scholfield =

English cricketer

Frank Beaumont Scholfield (16 November 1886 – 1 March 1950) was an English cricketer active from 1911 to 1912 who played for Lancashire. He was born in Whitefield and died in Chelsea. He appeared in one first-class match, scoring 17 runs with a highest score of 17.
