= Frederick Baucher =

English cricketer

Frederick William Baucher (6 November 1878 – 7 June 1947) was an English cricketer. He was a right-handed batsman and wicket-keeper who played for Lancashire. He was born in Wigan and died in Blundellsands.

Baucher made a single first-class appearance for the side, during the 1903 season, against Sussex. From the tailend, he scored 8 runs in the first innings in which he batted, and 4 runs in the second.
