= Edwin Whittaker =

English cricketer

Edwin Whittaker (4 December 1834 – 25 June 1880) was an English cricketer active from 1863 to 1868 who played for Lancashire. He was born in Ashton-under-Lyne and died in Matlock. He appeared in 14 first-class matches as a righthanded batsman who sometimes kept wicket. He scored 291 runs with a highest score of 39 and completed four catches.
