= Fred Hartley (cricketer) =

English cricketer

Fred Hartley (24 April 1906 – 24 December 1976) was an English cricketer active from 1923 to 1945 who played for Lancashire. He was born and died in Bacup. He appeared in two first-class matches as a righthanded batsman who bowled slow left arm orthodox. He scored two runs and took one wickets.
