= Alfred Pewtress =

English cricketer

Alfred William Pewtress (27 August 1891 – 21 September 1960) was an English cricketer active from 1919 to 1925 who played for Lancashire. He was born in Rawtenstall and died in Brighton. He appeared in 50 first-class matches as a righthanded batsman, scoring 1,483 runs with a highest score of 89 and held 16 catches.
