= James Mayall =

English cricketer

James Mayall (8 January 1856 – 13 September 1916) was an English cricketer. He was a wicket-keeper who played for Lancashire. He was born and died in Oldham, Lancashire.

Mayall made his only first-class appearance against Gloucestershire in 1885. A tailend batsman, he was bowled out for a duck in the only innings in which he batted. He made one catch and two stumpings.

Mayall also played for several Oldham teams in miscellaneous matches between 1878 and 1886.
