= Septimus Palmer =

Australian cricketer

Septimus Palmer (23 August 1858 – 14 December 1935) was an Australian cricketer active from 1879 to 1880 who played for Lancashire. He was born in Collingwood, Melbourne and died in Kensington. He appeared in six first-class matches, scoring 28 runs with a highest score of 8 and held four catches.
