= George Biddolph =

English cricketer

George Henry Biddolph (28 March 1858 – 21 April 1937) was an English cricketer who was active in 1885. He was born in Manchester and died in Melbourne. He made his first-class debut in 1885 and appeared in one match as a right-handed batsman who bowled right arm medium pace, playing for Lancashire. He scored 19 runs with a highest score of 18 and took no wickets.
