= George Radcliffe (cricketer) =

English cricketer

George Radcliffe (25 September 1877 – 27 October 1951) was an English cricketer active from 1903 to 1906 who played for Lancashire. He was born and died in Dukinfield. He appeared in seven first-class matches as a righthanded batsman, scoring 171 runs with a highest score of 60 and held two catches.
