= William Worsley (cricketer, born 1869) =

English cricketer (1869–1918)

Bill Worsley
Personal information
- Born: 11 September 1869
- Died: 13 November 1918 (aged 49)

William Worsley (11 September 1869 – 13 November 1918) was an English cricketer, active from 1903 to 1913, who played for Lancashire. He was born in Wandsworth, and died in Accrington. Worsley was a coal miner who played for Church in the Lancashire League.

Worsley was a wicket-keeper, and he appeared in 136 first-class matches, holding 239 catches and completing 45 stumpings. As a batsman, he was a right-handed tail-ender, scoring 628 career runs with a highest score of 37*. In 1907, Worsley equalled the still-unbeaten world record of being dismissed without scoring in six consecutive innings.

Cricket writer and journalist Neville Cardus related the story of Worsley’s debut for Lancashire at Edgbaston. He celebrated his call up with a crême de menthe before standing up to the stumps for the fast bowling of Walter Brearley, and holding two "brilliant" catches down the leg side.

== Bibliography ==
- Cardus, Neville (2019). Field of Tents and Waving Colours. London: Safe Haven Books. ISBN 978-19-16045-30-9. OCLC 1086559810.
