= Edward Porter (cricketer) =

English cricketer

Edward Horatio Porter (13 October 1846 – 31 October 1918) was an English cricketer active from 1874 to 1883 who played for Lancashire. He was born in Liverpool and died in Hooton, Cheshire. He appeared in 20 first-class matches as a righthanded batsman who bowled right arm medium pace with a roundarm action. He scored 374 runs with a highest score of 61 and held 13 catches. He took three wickets with a best analysis of three for 28.
