= Frederick Crabtree (Lancashire cricketer) =

British cricketer

Frederick Crabtree (10 March 1867 – 28 November 1893) was an English cricketer active in 1890 who played for Lancashire. He was born in Shipley and died in Nelson, Lancashire. He appeared in one first-class match, scoring one run and held one catch.
