= Stephen Preston (cricketer) =

English cricketer (1905–1995)

- Born: 11 August 1905; Heywood, Lancashire
- Died: 30 June 1995 (aged 89); Hambleton near Blackpool, Lancashire

Stephen Preston (11 August 1905 – 30 June 1995) was an English cricketer active from 1928 to 1930 who played for Lancashire. He was born in Heywood and played for his home town club before joining the Lancashire ground staff. He died in Hambleton near Blackpool. He appeared in five first-class matches as a righthanded batsman who bowled right arm medium pace. He scored 46 runs with a highest score of 33 and held one catch. He took six wickets with a best analysis of two for 42.
