= James Edmonds (cricketer) =

English cricketer

Personal information
- Full name: James William Edmonds
- Born: 4 June 1951; Smethwick, Staffordshire, England
- Died: 14 June 2011 (aged 60); Sutton Coldfield, Warwickshire, England
- Batting: Right-handed
- Bowling: Left-arm fast-medium

Domestic team information
- Years: Team
- 1975: Lancashire

Career statistics
Competition	First-class
Matches	1
Runs scored	–
Batting average	–
100s/50s	–/–
Top score	–
Balls bowled	215
Wickets	3
Bowling average	27.33
5 wickets in innings	–
10 wickets in match	–
Best bowling	3/52
Catches/stumpings	–/–
- Source: Cricinfo, 16 June 2012

James William Edmonds (4 June 1951 – 14 June 2011) was an English cricketer. Edmonds was a right-handed batsman who bowled left-arm fast-medium. He was born at Smethwick, Staffordshire.

Edmonds made a single first-class appearance for Lancashire against Cambridge University at Fenner's in 1975. Cambridge University won the toss and elected to bat first, making 232 all out in their first-innings, during which Edmonds bowled 20.5 overs for 52, taking the wickets of Richard Smyth, Stephen Wookey, and Mark Allbrook. Lancashire then made 409 declared in their first-innings, during which Edmonds wasn't required to bat. Cambridge University reached 240/6 in their second-innings, at which point the match was declared a draw. This was his only major appearance for Lancashire.

He died at Sutton Coldfield, Warwickshire, on 14 June 2011.
