= Reginald Smith (cricketer) =

English cricketer

Reginald Smith (1 May 1868 – 5 October 1943) was an English cricketer active in 1893 who played for Lancashire. He was born in Warrington and died in Scarborough. He appeared in one first-class match, scoring six runs with a highest score of 6.
