= Henry Hibbard (cricketer) =

English cricketer

Henry Hibbard (1853 – 12 February 1902) was an English cricketer active in 1884 who played for Lancashire. He was born in Barlborough, Derbyshire and died in Liverpool. He appeared in one first-class match and scored seven runs with a highest score of 4. He took two wickets with a best analysis of two for 35.
