= Samuel Swire (cricketer) =

English cricketer

Samuel Henry Swire (3 January 1839 – 29 December 1905) was an English cricketer active from 1865 to 1868 who played for Lancashire. He was born in Ashton-under-Lyne and died in Southport. He appeared in five first-class matches as a righthanded batsman who scored 93 runs with a highest score of 18 not out.
