= Harry Pennington (cricketer) =

English cricketer (1880–1961)

Harry Pennington (21 April 1880 – 17 March 1961) was an English cricketer active in 1900 who played for Lancashire. He was born in Salford and died in Moston. He appeared in four first-class matches as a righthanded batsman and wicketkeeper. He scored 41 runs with a highest score of 29* and held two catches with three stumpings.
