= Frederick Gaddum =

English cricketer (1860–1900)

Frederick Ducange Gaddum (28 June 1860 – 14 October 1900) was an English cricketer active from 1880 to 1884 who played for Cambridge University and Lancashire. He appeared in eleven first-class matches as a lefthanded batsman who bowled slow left arm orthodox. He scored 87 runs with a highest score of 16 and held nine catches. He took 21 wickets with a best analysis of four for 34.

Gaddum was born in Didsbury (now a suburb of Manchester) and educated at Uppingham, Rugby and St John's College, Cambridge. After graduating from Cambridge he became a merchant in Manchester. He died in Stockport from the result of a bicycle accident.
