= William Oakley (cricketer) =

English cricketer

William Oakley (6 May 1868 – unknown) was an English cricketer active in first-class play from 1892 to 1894 who played for Lancashire.

He was born in Shrewsbury.

He appeared in 24 first-class matches as a bowler of left arm medium pace. He scored 144 runs with a highest score of 24 and held 21 catches. He took 55 wickets with a best analysis of six for 50.

Below first-class cricket, Oakley also played for the Liverpool and District teams as well as at county level for Shropshire between 1891 and 1905, playing in 34 matches where he made a total 394 runs and took 239 wickets. He was engaged as a professional player for the cricket clubs of Sefton in Liverpool, Todmorden and Scarborough.
