= William Rawlinson (cricketer) =

English cricketer

William Rawlinson (5 September 1850 – 12 May 1919) was an English cricketer active from 1870 to 1871 who played for Lancashire. He was born and died in Burnley. He appeared in three first-class matches, scoring 24 runs with a highest score of 10 and held one catch.
