= Richard Sutcliffe (cricketer) =

English cricketer (born 1954)

Richard John Sutcliffe (born 18 September 1954) is an English former cricketer active from 1977 to 1979 who played for Lancashire. He was born in Rochdale. He appeared in one first-class match as a righthanded batsman who bowled right arm medium pace. He scored 10 runs with a highest score of 10* and took one wicket with a best analysis of one for 37.
