= Alfred Tinsley =

English cricketer

Alfred Tinsley (12 March 1867 – 25 September 1933) was an English cricketer active from 1890 to 1895 who played for Lancashire. He was born in Malton and died in Musselburgh. He appeared in 58 first-class matches as a righthanded batsman, scoring 1,348 runs with a highest score of 65 and held 27 catches.
