= Frank Harrison (cricketer) =

English cricketer

Frank Harrison (1909 – 9 June 1955) was an English cricketer active from 1936 to 1952 who played for Lancashire. He was born in England (town unknown) and died in York. He appeared in three first-class matches and bowled right arm leg break. He scored four runs with a highest score of 2* and held three catches. He took four wickets with a best analysis of two for 30.
