= William Richmond (cricketer) =

English cricketer (1843–1912)

William Richmond (1 December 1843 – 11 November 1912) was an English cricketer.

Richmond was born at Burnley in Lancashire, the son of a grocer. He won awards for athletics as a young man and played club cricket for Burnley Cricket Club, considered as a powerful batsman. He played in a single first-class cricket match for Lancashire County Cricket Club in 1868, scoring a single run in his two innings.

Richmond was in business in Burnley as a textile machinist. He was a freemason and organist at a non-conformist chapel in the town. He died in 1912 aged 68.
