= George Wharmby =

English cricketer

George Edward Wharmby (7 December 1870 – 15 November 1951) was an English cricketer active from 1891 to 1894 who played for Lancashire and Nottinghamshire. He was born in Sutton-in-Ashfield and died in Rustington. He appeared in ten first-class matches as a righthanded batsman who bowled right arm medium pace. He scored 36 runs with a highest score of 11 and held four catches. He took nine wickets with a best analysis of three for 35.
