= Roger Watson (cricketer) =

English cricketer (born 1964)

Roger Graeme Watson (born 14 January 1964) is an English former cricketer active from 1980 to 1985 who played for Lancashire. He was born in Rawtenstall, Lancashire. He appeared in two first-class matches as a left-handed batsman and scored 33 runs with a highest score of 18. His nephew, Matt Watson played first-class cricket for Oxford UCCE.
