= John Whewell =

English cricketer

John William Whewell (8 May 1887 – 2 July 1948) was an English cricketer active from 1921 to 1927 who played for Lancashire. He was born in Rishton and died in Blackpool. He appeared in 14 first-class matches as a righthanded batsman and wicketkeeper. He scored 54 runs with a highest score of 25 and held 14 catches with seven stumpings.
