= Frederick Stephenson (English cricketer) =

English cricketer

Personal information
- Full name: Frederick Stephenson
- Born: 24 April 1853; Todmorden, Yorkshire, England
- Died: July 1927 (aged 74); England
- Batting: Left-handed
- Bowling: Left-arm roundarm fast

Domestic team information
- Years: Team
- 1875–1877: Lancashire

Career statistics
Competition	First-class
Matches	2
Runs scored	0
Batting average	0.00
100s/50s	–/–
Top score	0*
Balls bowled	32
Wickets	1
Bowling average	17.00
5 wickets in innings	–
10 wickets in match	–
Best bowling	1/17
Catches/stumpings	2/–
- Source: Cricinfo, 15 March 2015

Frederick Stephenson (24 April 1853 – July 1927) was an English cricketer active from 1875 to 1877 who played for Lancashire. He was born in Todmorden. He appeared in two first-class matches as a lefthanded batsman who bowled left arm fast with a roundarm action. He scored no runs and held two catches. He took one wicket with a best analysis of one for 17.

Stephenson made his debut in first-class cricket for Lancashire against Kent at the Catford Bridge in 1875. A second and final first-class appearance for Lancashire came against Derbyshire at Derby in 1877.

He died in July 1927, aged 74.
