= John Heap (cricketer) =

English cricketer (1857–1931)

John Garsden Heap (5 January 1857 – 20 April 1931) was an English cricketer active in 1884 who played for Lancashire. He was born in Accrington and died in Blackpool. He appeared in two first-class matches, scoring no runs and held two catches.
