= Leonard Horridge =

English cricketer (1907–1976)

Personal information
- Full name: Leonard Horridge
- Born: 18 August 1907; Adlington, Lancashire, England
- Died: 1 September 1976 (aged 69); Preston, Lancashire, England
- Batting: Right-handed
- Bowling: Right-arm off break

Domestic team information
- Years: Team
- 1928–1930: Minor Counties
- 1927–1929: Lancashire

Career statistics
Competition	First-class
Matches	5
Runs scored	57
Batting average	11.40
100s/50s	0/0
Top score	15
Balls bowled	174
Wickets	3
Bowling average	26.33
5 wickets in innings	0
10 wickets in match	0
Best bowling	2/46
Catches/stumpings	4/–
- Source: Cricinfo, 26 May 2012

Leonard Horridge (18 August 1907 – 1 September 1976) was an English cricketer. Horridge was a right-handed batsman who bowled right-arm off break. He was born in Adlington, Lancashire.

Horridge made two first-class appearances for Lancashire in the 1927 County Championship, against Northamptonshire and Leicestershire, and a further first-class appearance against the Minor Counties in 1930, scoring a total of 33 runs at an average of 16.50, while with the ball he took 3 wickets at a bowling average of 26.33, with best figures of 2/46. Although these were his only first-class appearances for the county, he did represent the county Second XI in the Minor Counties Championship, making 42 appearances from 1927 to 1930. This also allowed him to be selected for a combined Minor Counties team, making two first-class appearances for it, against the touring West Indians in 1928 and Lancashire in 1930, scoring a total of 24 runs.

He died at Preston, Lancashire, on 1 September 1976.
