= Edgar Hornby =

English cricketer

Edgar Christian Hornby (14 September 1863 – 2 April 1922) was an English cricketer active from 1885 to 1894 who played for Lancashire. He was born in Liverpool and died in Claygate, Surrey. He appeared in 13 first-class matches as a lefthanded batsman who bowled slow left arm orthodox. He scored 360 runs with a highest score of 82 and held ten catches. He took six wickets with a best analysis of two for 23.
