= James Schofield (cricketer, born 1854) =

English cricketer

Personal information
- Full name: James Schofield
- Born: 1854; Rochdale, Lancashire, England
- Died: Unknown
- Batting: Unknown
- Role: Wicket-keeper

Domestic team information
- Years: Team
- 1876: Lancashire

Career statistics
Competition	First-class
Matches	4
Runs scored	27
Batting average	6.75
100s/50s	–/–
Top score	11
Balls bowled	–
Wickets	–
Bowling average	–
5 wickets in innings	–
10 wickets in match	–
Best bowling	–
Catches/stumpings	7/1
- Source: Cricinfo, 4 September 2012

James Schofield (1854 – date of death unknown) was an English cricketer. Schofield's batting style is unknown, but it is known he played as a wicket-keeper. He was born at Rochdale, Lancashire.

Schofield made his first-class debut for Lancashire against Derbyshire at Old Trafford in 1876. He made three further first-class appearances for Lancashire in 1876, against Kent, Derbyshire and Sussex. In his four first-class appearances, he scored 27 runs at an average of 6.75, with a high score of 11. Behind the stumps he took seven catches and made a single stumping.
