= Donald Stone (cricketer) =

English cricketer

Donald Harry Stone (9 January 1927 – 2016) was an English cricketer active from 1949 to 1951 who played for Lancashire. He was born in Manchester. He appeared in six first-class matches as a lefthanded batsman who bowled right arm fast medium pace. He scored 86 runs with a highest score of 46 and held one catch. He took nine wickets with a best analysis of four for 30.
