= John Stanworth =

English cricketer (born 1960)

John Stanworth (born 30 September 1960) is a former English cricketer active from 1979 to 1992 who played for Lancashire. He was born in Oldham. He appeared in 44 first-class matches as a righthanded batsman and wicketkeeper. He scored 266 runs with a highest score of 50* and held 63 catches with 10 stumpings.
