= Harry Thornber =

English cricketer

Personal information
- Full name: Harry Thornber
- Born: 9 November 1851; Manchester, Lancashire, England
- Died: 28 July 1913 (aged 61); St Pancras, London, England
- Batting: Right-handed

Domestic team information
- Years: Team
- 1874: Lancashire

Career statistics
Competition	First-class
Matches	1
Runs scored	0
Batting average	0.00
100s/50s	–/–
Top score	0
Balls bowled	–
Wickets	–
Bowling average	–
5 wickets in innings	–
10 wickets in match	–
Best bowling	–
Catches/stumpings	–/–
- Source: Cricinfo, 17 March 2015

Harry Thornber (9 November 1851 – 28 July 1913) was an English cricketer. Born in Manchester, Lancashire, he was a right-handed batsman who made one appearance in first-class cricket.

Thornber played club cricket for Manchester and Sale before making his appearance in first-class cricket for Lancashire in 1874 against Kent at Maidstone. He opened the batting alongside Dick Barlow in Lancashire's first innings but was dismissed for a duck by James Fellowes, while in their second innings, he batted lower in the order and was again dismissed for a duck, this time run out. He was described as a steady middle-order batsman with a sound defense.

Outside cricket, Thornber was a merchant trading with the East Indies. He died in St Pancras, London on 28 July 1913.
