= Richard Sanderson (cricketer) =

English cricketer (1847–1906)

Richard Withington Bromiley Sanderson (15 January 1847 – 26 April 1906) was an English cricketer active in 1870 who played for Lancashire. He was born in Manchester and died in Rhode Island. He appeared in one first-class match, scoring seven runs with a highest score of 6.
