= Thomas Whatmough =

English cricketer

Thomas Whatmough (26 March 1844 – 19 March 1911) was an English cricketer active in 1871 who played for Lancashire. He was born and died in Manchester. He appeared in two first-class matches as a righthanded batsman who bowled right arm fast with a roundarm action. He scored 42 runs with a highest score of 28* and held one catch. He took three wickets with a best analysis of two for 52.
