= George Potter (cricketer) =

English cricketer

George Potter (3 October 1878 – unknown) was an English cricketer active in 1902 who played for Lancashire. He was born in Runcorn. He appeared in ten first-class matches as a righthanded batsman, scoring 449 runs with a highest score of 86 and held three catches.
