= Walter Marchbank =

English cricketer

Walter James Marchbank (2 November 1838 – 9 August 1893) was an English cricketer active from 1869 to 1870 who played for Lancashire. He was born and died in Preston. He appeared in four first-class matches as a batsman and wicketkeeper. He scored 20 runs with a highest score of 15 and held one catch with two stumpings.
