= Alfred Ollivant (cricketer) =

English cricketer

Personal information
- Full name: Alfred Ollivant
- Born: 4 January 1839; Manchester, Lancashire, England
- Died: 26 May 1906 (aged 67); Bowdon, Cheshire, England
- Batting: Unknown

Domestic team information
- Years: Team
- 1873–1874: Lancashire

Career statistics
Competition	First-class
Matches	2
Runs scored	38
Batting average	18.00
100s/50s	–/–
Top score	24*
Balls bowled	–
Wickets	–
Bowling average	–
5 wickets in innings	–
10 wickets in match	–
Best bowling	–
Catches/stumpings	–/–
- Source: Cricinfo, 22 September 2012

Alfred Ollivant (4 January 1839 – 26 May 1906) was an English cricketer. Ollivant's batting style is unknown. He was born at Manchester, Lancashire.

Ollivant made his first-class debut for Lancashire against Derbyshire in 1873 at the County Ground, Derby. He made a second first-class appearance in 1874 against the same opposition at Old Trafford. He scored a total of 36 runs from his two matches, with a high score of 24 not out.

He died at Bowdon, Cheshire, on 26 May 1906.
