= Thomas Wall (cricketer) =

English cricketer

Thomas Wall (27 November 1841 – 19 April 1875) was an English cricketer active in 1868 who played for Lancashire. He was born and died in Wigan. He appeared in two first-class matches as a righthanded batsman and occasional wicketkeeper who also bowled right arm slow-paced roundarm. He scored 48 runs with a highest score of 37 and held one catch, but took no wickets.
