= Leach (surname) =

Leach is a surname, originally denoting a physician (in reference to the medical practice of bloodletting). Notable people with the surname include:

== A-G ==
- Al Leach (1935–2024), Canadian transportation executive and politician
- Anne Winship Bates Leach (1896–1977), American heiress and philanthropist
- Archie Leach (1904–1986), real name of English-American actor Cary Grant
- Aubrey Leach (born 1996), American softball player
- Ben Leach (born 1969), player in English pop group The Farm
- Bernard Leach (1887–1979), British studio potter and art teacher
- Bobby Leach (1858–1926), English circus performer, went over Niagara Falls in a barrel
- Buddy Leach (1934–2022), American politician
- Britt Leach (born 1938), American character actor
- Cecil Leach (1894–1973), English cricketer
- Dewitt C. Leach (1822–1909), U.S. Representative from Michigan
- David Leach (disambiguation)
- Dominique Leach, American chef
- Edmund Leach (1910–1989), British anthropologist
- Sir Edward Pemberton Leach (1847–1913), Irish general in the British Army, recipient of the Victoria Cross
- Edward G. Leach, American politician
- Elizabeth Eva Leach, British medievalist, musicologist and academic
- Ellie Leach (born 2001), English actress
- Ethel Leach (1850 or 1851 – 1936), British politician
- Esther Leach (1809–1843), English-Indian actress
- Foss Leach (1942- ), New Zealand anthropologist
- Francis Leach (born 1968), Australian radio announcer
- Garry Leach (1954–2022), British comics artist and publisher
- George Leach (musician), Canadian musician and actor
- George E. Leach (1876–1955), United States Army general and politician

== H-M ==
- Helen Leach (1945–2026), New Zealand anthropologist
- Henry Leach (British Army officer) (1870–1936), British Army general
- Sir Henry Leach (1923–2011), Royal Navy admiral
- Henry Goddard Leach (1880–1970), American Scandinavian studies scholar
- Howard H. Leach, American diplomat
- Jack Leach, English cricketer
- Jalal Leach (born 1969), American baseball player
- James Madison Leach (1815–1891), American politician from North Carolina
- James Leach (soldier) (1892–1957), British soldier and Victoria Cross holder
- Jan E. Leach (born 1952/1953), American plant pathologist
- Jason Leach (born 1982), American football player
- Jasper Leach (born 1986), American musician, writer, and recording engineer
- Jesse Leach (born 1978), American musician
- Jim Leach (1942–2024), American politician from Iowa
- Joe Leach (born 1990), English cricketer
- John Leach (disambiguation)
- Joshua A. Leach (1843–1919) — founder of the Brotherhood of Locomotive Firemen
- Julian Gilbert Leach (1894–1972), American plant pathologist
- Karoline Leach (born 1967), British playwright and author
- Kimberly Leach (1965–1978), murder victim of Ted Bundy
- Lillian Leach (1936–2013), American singer
- Mandy Leach (born 1979), Zimbabwean freestyle swimmer
- Marc Leach (born 1994), English professional boxer
- Martin Leach (executive) (1957–2016), British businessman and engineer
- Martin Leach (Australian murderer) (born 1959), Australian convicted murderer and rapist
- Mary Leach (disambiguation), multiple people
- Mick Leach (1947–1992), English soccer player
- Mike Leach (tennis) (born 1960), American tennis player
- Mike Leach (American football coach) (1961–2022), American football coach
- Mike Leach (long snapper) (born 1976), American football player

== N-W ==
- Neil Leach, British architect and theorist
- Nicole Leach (born 1979), American actress and singer
- Penelope Leach (born 1937), British child psychologist and parenting author
- Reggie Leach (born 1950), Canadian professional ice hockey player
- Rick Leach (born 1964), American tennis player and coach
- Rick Leach (baseball) (born 1957), American baseball and football player
- Robert M. Leach (1879–1952), United States Representative from Massachusetts
- Robert E. Leach (1911–1993), Republican judge in the U.S. State of Ohio
- Robin Leach (1941–2018), English entertainer
- Rosemary Leach (1935–2017), English stage, television and film actress
- Sheryl Leach (born 1952), American children's TV show creator and author, known for the series Barney & Friends
- Steve Leach (ice hockey) (born 1966), American ice hockey player
- Steve Leach (cricketer) (born 1993), English cricketer
- Terry Leach (born 1954), former Major League Baseball player
- Tommy Leach (1877–1969), Major League Baseball player
- Vonta Leach (born 1981), American football fullback for the Houston Texans
- William Leach (disambiguation), multiple people

== See also ==
- Leach (disambiguation)
- Leech (disambiguation)
