= John Leach (cricketer) =

English cricketer

Personal information
- Born: 17 October 1846; Rochdale, Lancashire, England
- Died: 1 February 1893 (aged 46); Rochdale, Lancashire, England
- Batting: Right-handed
- Relatives: William Leach (brother); Harold Leach (brother); Robert Leach (brother); Roger Leach (brother)

Domestic team information
- Years: Team
- 1866–1877: Lancashire

Career statistics
| Competition | First-class |
|---|---|
| Matches | 5 |
| Runs scored | 103 |
| Batting average | 11.44 |
| 100s/50s | 0/0 |
| Top score | 34 |
| Catches/stumpings | 1/– |
- Source: Cricinfo, 18 September 2012

John Leach (17 October 1846 – 1 February 1893) was an English cricketer. Leach was a right-handed batsman. He was born at Rochdale, Lancashire.

Leach made his first-class cricket debut for Lancashire County Cricket Club against Middlesex in 1866 at Old Trafford. He made two further first-class appearances in 1866, against Middlesex in the return fixture at the Cattle Market Ground, Islington, and Surrey at The Oval. He made his next first-class appearance ten years later against Kent at Castleton Cricket Club Ground, Rochdale and a final appearance the following season against MCC at Lord's. In his five first-class matches, he scored a total of 103 runs at an average of 11.44, and a highest score of 34 runs.

His died at the town of his birth on 1 February 1893. His brothers, William, Harold, Robert and Roger, all played first-class cricket.
