= Harold Leach =

English cricketer

Personal information
- Full name: Harold Leach
- Born: 3 March 1862; Rochdale, Lancashire, England
- Died: 15 February 1928 (aged 65); Widcombe, Somerset, England
- Batting: Right-handed
- Bowling: Right-arm slow
- Relatives: William Leach (brother); Roger Leach (brother); Robert Leach (brother); John Leach (brother); Neil Smith (great-nephew)

Domestic team information
- Years: Team
- 1881: Lancashire

Career statistics
Competition	First-class
Matches	3
Runs scored	101
Batting average	25.25
100s/50s	–/–
Top score	46
Catches/stumpings	2/–
- Source: Cricinfo, 23 November 2014

Harold Leach (3 March 1862 – 15 February 1928) was an English cricketer active in the 1880s and 1890s. Born at Rochdale, Lancashire, Leach was a right-handed batsman and right-arm slow bowler who made three appearances in first-class cricket.

Educated at Marlborough College, where he played for the college cricket team, Leach made his debut in first-class cricket for Lancashire against Surrey at Old Trafford in 1881, in what was his only appearance for the county. At club level Leach played for Liverpool, and in 1884 he was selected to play for Liverpool and District in a first-class match against the touring Australians at Aigburth. He made a third and final first-class appearance in 1891, when playing for Liverpool and District against Yorkshire. He scored a total of 101 runs in his three first-class matches, top-scoring with 46 and averaging 25.25.

Leach came from a substantial cricketing family; four brothers (William, Roger, Robert and John) all played first-class cricket, as did his great-nephew Neil Smith. A number of other brothers who did not play first-class cricket were pioneers of cricket in Argentina. Outside of cricket, Leach worked as a stockbroker. He died at Widcombe, Somerset on 15 February 1928.
