= Lakes High School =

Coordinates: 47.162°N 122.575°W

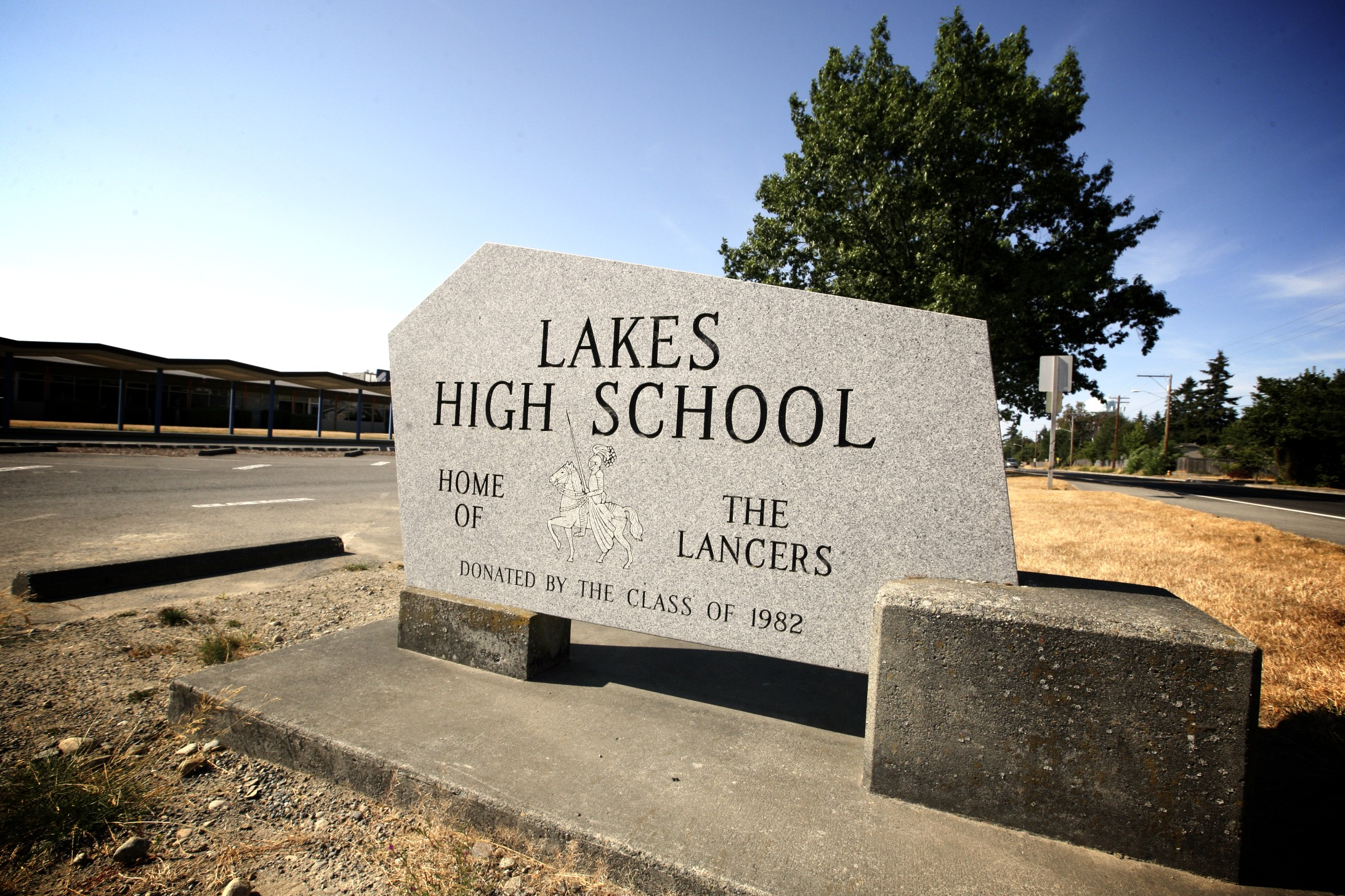
- 10320 Farwest Dr. SW; Lakewood, Washington 98498

Information
- Type: Public
- Motto: "Once a Lancer Always a Lancer!"
- Established: 1962
- School district: Clover Park School District
- Principal: Ray Kurtz
- Staff: 60.00 (FTE)
- Grades: 9-12
- Enrollment: 1,195 (2023-2024)
- Student to teacher ratio: 19.92
- Colors: Orange & Blue
- Athletics: Football, Soccer, Volleyball, Cross Country, Swimming, Tennis, Golf, Basketball, Baseball, Softball, Track, Wrestling, Water Polo, Bowling, Dance
- Athletics conference: WIAA
- Mascot: Lancers
- Rival: Clover Park High School
- Information: 253-583-5550
- Website: Link

Lakes High School is located in Lakewood, Washington. It serves students from 9th grade to 12th grade. It is one of the two major high schools in the Clover Park School District.

== Daffodil Festival ==
Every year, Lakes participates in the Pierce County Daffodil Festival. A competition is held in house to select the Lakes Princess, who goes on to compete against other regional schools, for the Daffodil Festival Queen title. The Queen title is considered the highest honor of the regional festival. The Lakes Band accompanies the float through various towns and 4 stops throughout areas such as Tacoma in Western Washington. The Lakes Army Junior Reserve Officers' Training Corps also attends as well, showing up in a similar way in Uniform.

== Football ==
The Lakes football team has had several championship-level seasons. The team won the state championship in 1997, was a state champion runner-up in 2000, placed third in 3A WIAA State playoffs in 1999, 2002, 2008, 2009, 2010, and 2015. The Lancers also produced a regular season winning streak of 45 games during 1999-2003, before losing to Clover Park High School. The football team won the league championship in 1970, 1973, 1974, 1990, 1992, 1993, 1994, 1997, 1999, 2000, 2001, 2002, 2003, 2004, 2006, 2008, 2009, 2010, and 2011.

NFL football player Zach Banner attended Lakes High School, where he was a two-time football All-American offensive lineman on the Lancers football team. As a junior in 2010, he made USA Today All-USA first team. His 2011 honors as a senior included USA Today All-USA first team, Super Prep All-American, and Sports Illustrated All-American first team. Regarded as a five-star recruit by Rivals.com, he was ranked as the No. 2 offensive tackle in his class. Banner also played center in basketball for Lakes High School, averaging 18.6 points and 17.3 rebounds, while guiding Lakes to the 2011 Washington State Class 3A championship in his junior year. In addition, he was the Lakes class president.

== Choral Programs ==
Lakes' choral program was organized in the fall of 1962 by Edward R. Harmic.

== Notable alumni ==
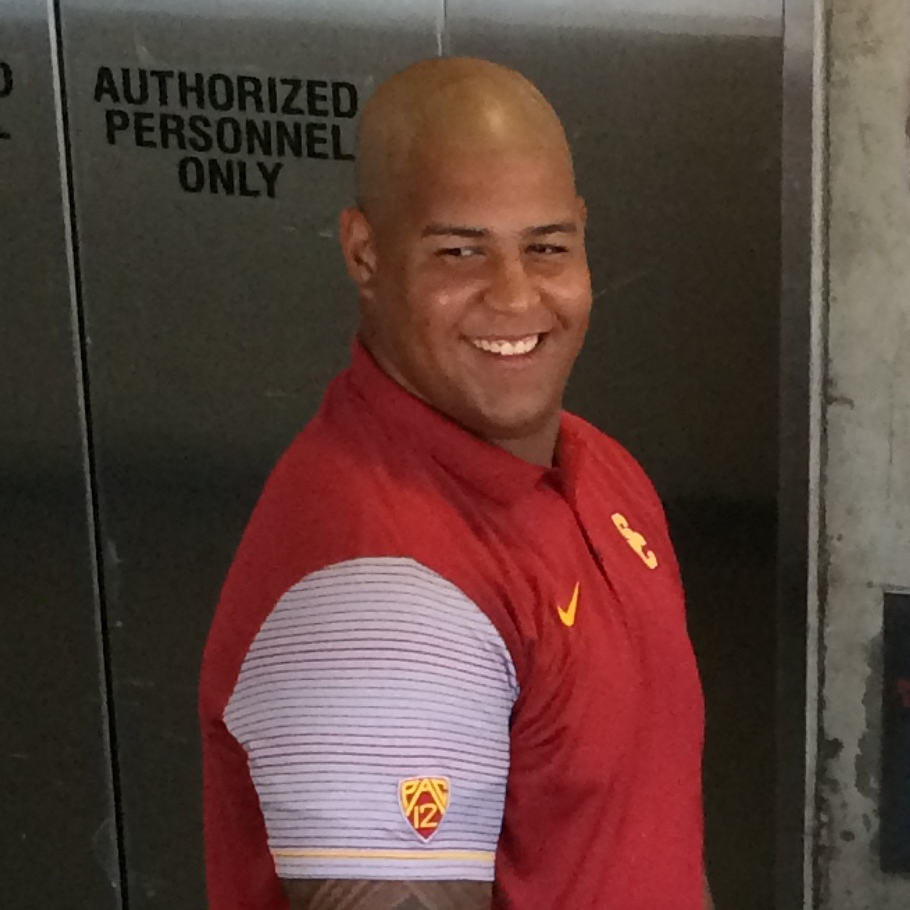
Zach Banner

- Rick Austin – Former MLB player (Cleveland Indians, Milwaukee Brewers)
- Zach Banner – NFL football offensive tackle for the Pittsburgh Steelers
- Robert Cray – Blues musician/guitarist
- Joseph Edward Duncan – serial killer
- Donald Glaude – Electronic music artist
- Georgeann Hawkins – Daffodil Princess and murder victim
- Fletcher Jenkins – Former defensive lineman for the Baltimore Colts.
- Jermaine Kearse – Former NFL wide receiver
- Drew Miller – American football player
- Benning Potoa'e – Defensive end for the Tampa Bay Buccaneers
- Anthony Russo – Wide receiver for the University of Washington and Seattle Seahawks
- William A. Ryan III – US Army major general
- Kate Starbird – Former WNBA player (Sacramento Monarchs, Utah Starzz, Seattle Storm, and Indiana Fever)
- Wanz - Grammy-winning hip hop artist
- Reggie Williams – Former wide receiver for the Seattle Seahawks and Jacksonville Jaguars.
- Steve Wilson – Local TV actor, director, and comedian on Almost Live!
