= Enoch Tranter =

English cricketer

Personal information
- Full name: Enoch Tranter
- Born: 27 April 1842; Old Park, Shropshire, England
- Died: 23 September 1910 (aged 68); Donnington Wood, Shropshire, England
- Height: 5 ft 7 in (1.70 m)
- Batting: Left-handed
- Bowling: Left-arm roundarm fast

Domestic team information
- Years: Team
- 1875–1876: Lancashire

Career statistics
| Competition | First-class |
|---|---|
| Matches | 3 |
| Runs scored | 9 |
| Batting average | 1.80 |
| 100s/50s | –/– |
| Top score | 5 |
| Balls bowled | 236 |
| Wickets | 3 |
| Bowling average | 31.33 |
| 5 wickets in innings | – |
| 10 wickets in match | – |
| Best bowling | 2/11 |
| Catches/stumpings | 2/– |
- Source: Cricinfo, 15 March 2015

Enoch Tranter (27 April 1842 – 23 September 1910) was an English cricketer active in the mid-1870s. Born at Old Park, Shropshire, Tranter was a left-handed batsman and left-arm roundarm fast bowler who made three appearances in first-class cricket.

During the 1870s Tranter played his club cricket for Sefton Park in Liverpool, and was selected to play for Lancashire in 1875, making his debut in first-class cricket against Derbyshire at Old Trafford. He made two further first-class appearances for Lancashire, one in 1875 against the Marylebone Cricket Club at Lord's, and against Kent at Rochdale in 1876. Tranter took 3 wickets with his roundarm bowling, with best figures of 2/11. When fielding he would often field at slip.

His occupation outside of cricket was as a coal miner. He died at Donnington Wood, Shropshire on 23 September 1910.
