= Roger Leach =

Roger Leach may refer to:

- Roger Leach (actor) (1948–2001), English-Australian actor
- Roger Leach (cricketer) (1853–1889), English cricketer
