= Robert Leach =

Robert Leach may refer to:

- Bob Leach (1914–2008), American journalist and screenwriter
- Robert E. Leach (1911–1993), Republican judge in the U.S. State of Ohio
- Robert M. Leach (1879–1952), U.S. Representative from Massachusetts
- Robert Leach (cricketer) (1849–1939), English cricketer
