= Edward Leach =

Edward Leach may refer to:

- Edward Pemberton Leach (1847–1913), VC recipient
- Edward Leach (bowls) (1880–1949), New Zealand lawn bowls player
- Edward Leach (cricketer), formerly the presumed identity of Cecil Leach (1894–1973), English cricketer
- Edward G. Leach, American politician

== See also ==
- Edward Leech (disambiguation)
