= Zach Banner =

American football player (born 1993)

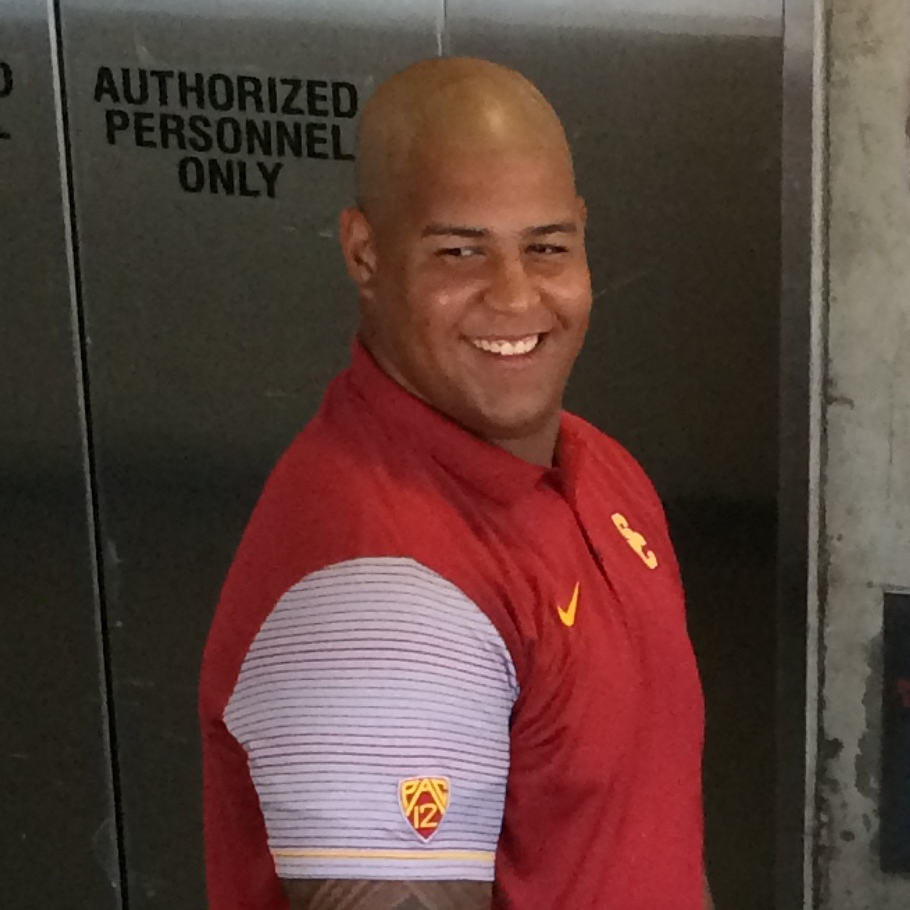
- Banner in 2016

No. 77, 72
- Position: Offensive tackle

Personal information
- Born: December 25, 1993 (age 32); Seattle, Washington, U.S.
- Listed height: 6 ft 8 in (2.03 m)
- Listed weight: 335 lb (152 kg)

Career information
- High school: Lakes (Lakewood, Washington)
- College: USC (2013–2016)
- NFL draft: 2017: 4th round, 137th overall pick

Career history
- Indianapolis Colts (2017)*; Cleveland Browns (2017); Carolina Panthers (2018)*; Pittsburgh Steelers (2018–2021); Houston Roughnecks (2025)
- * Offseason or practice squad member only

Awards and highlights
- 2× First-team All-Pac-12 (2015, 2016)

Career NFL statistics
- Games played: 30
- Games started: 2
- Stats at Pro Football Reference

Zachery Samuel Banner (born December 25, 1993), nicknamed "the Hulk", is an American former professional football player who was an offensive tackle in the National Football League (NFL). He played tackle in college football for the USC Trojans, where he was a two-time All-American and first-team All-Pac-12. Banner was selected by the Indianapolis Colts in the fourth round of the 2017 NFL draft, and made his NFL debut with the Cleveland Browns the same year. He was also a member of the Carolina Panthers and Pittsburgh Steelers.

== Early life ==
Banner is a native of Tacoma, Washington, where he grew up on the East Side, and has also lived in Puyallup, Washington He is the biological son of former National Football League (NFL) Pro Bowl offensive tackle and College Football Hall of Famer, Lincoln Kennedy, who had dated his mother but never married her. However, he was raised by Ron Banner, the superintendent of the Clover Park School District in Lakewood, who married his mother when he was eight years old and legally adopted him the following year. His mother, Vanessa, is Chamorro (the indigenous people of the Mariana Islands), was born in Fort Lewis, Washington, and works as a middle school administrator. Banner had no idea who Lincoln Kennedy was, or that he was his real father, until he was a seventh grader.

He is of Chamorro and African-American descent. Banner was already 5 feet (1.52 m) tall in second grade, 6 ft 4 in (1.93 m) in the seventh grade, 6 ft 6 in (1.98 m) the following year, and 6 ft 7 in (2.01 m) and over 300 pounds (140 kilograms) his first year of high school. His maternal grandfather was Rafael "Ralph" Mendiola Sukola, of Agana Heights and Dededo, Guam. His younger brother, Xavier, played football at Eastern Washington University as a linebacker, and his sister, Mia, is a high school soccer goalie.

== High school ==
Banner attended Lakes High School, where he was a two-time football All-American offensive lineman on the Lancers football team, and played two seasons at left tackle. He was named the Lancers' Most Inspirational Player when he was a freshman, and still a bench player. As a junior in 2010, he made USA Today All-USA first team, Max Preps All-American second team, Max Preps All-American Medium Schools first team, Max Preps Junior All-American first team, and All-State 3-A first team.

His 2011 honors as a senior included USA Today All-USA first team, Super Prep All-American, Prep Star All-American, Sports Illustrated All-American first team, Max Preps All-American second team, Max Preps All-American Medium Schools first team, Prep Star Top 150 Dream Team, ESPNU 150, Super Prep All-Farwest, Prep Star All-West, Tacoma News Tribune Western 100, Seattle Times All-State, Orange County Register Fab 15 first team, Tacoma News Tribune Northwest Nuggets, and Tacoma News Tribune All-Area first team. He was a finalist for the 2012 Watkins Award, by the National Alliance of African American Athletes, honoring the top African-American student athlete in the nation. Regarded as a five-star recruit by Rivals.com, he was ranked as the No. 2 offensive tackle in his class, behind only D. J. Humphries. He was rated the 16th-best prospect in the country by Rivals.com.

Banner also played center in basketball for Lakes High School, averaging 18.6 points and 17.3 rebounds, while guiding Lakes to the 2011 Washington State Class 3A championship in his junior year.

He was also the Lakes class president, logged 373 community service hours, and had a 3.6 grade point average. His nicknames in high school were "Big Daddy" and "The Diesel."

== College career ==
Banner had more than 20 college scholarship offers. Ultimately, he chose USC over Oklahoma and Washington.

Banner played tackle at both positions in college football for the USC Trojans from 2013 to 2016 under head coaches Steve Sarkisian and Clay Helton. He played 39 games, and started 37 of them.

He red-shirted in 2012. Banner played only two games during his red-shirted freshman 2013 season, as the back-up offensive tackle against Hawaii and Boston College, before being ruled out for the season due to an injury to both hips that required two hip surgeries. He had been born with a condition known as femoroacetabular impingement (FAI) that involved extra bone growth on his hips, that prevented him from squatting past 90 degrees, and had corrective hip surgery to address the problem.

In 2014 as a sophomore Banner played every game at right tackle and was College Football News Sophomore All-American honorable mention. In 2015 as a junior he was First Team All-Pac-12 Conference, Associated Press All-Pac 12 second-team, Phil Steele's All-Pac-12 second-team, CollegeSportsMadness.com All-American third-team, and won USC's Offensive Lineman of the Year Award. He started all 14 games and his main position was at right tackle, but he started two games at left tackle during his junior year against Utah and Wisconsin. In 2015 he allowed only nine total pressures on 426 pass attempts, according to Pro Football Focus, which graded him as the season's top pass-blocking right tackle, and the 15th-best run-blocking right tackle.

As a senior in 2016, and captain of the team, he was again All-Pac-12 first-team, was CollegeSportsMadness.com All American first-team, Senior CLASS Award All-American first-team, Phil Steele All-Pac-12 first-team, a finalist for the Senior CLASS Award (given to the nation's top senior excelling in community/classroom/character/competition), and was the team's Co-Offensive Lineman of the Year. He was the largest player in college football; at one point in 2015 the 6 ft 9 in (2.06 m) Banner weighed 385 pounds (175 kilograms). He played in the Senior Bowl in January 2017.

Banner also played basketball for USC in 2013, but did not see any playing time. Banner joined the historically Jewish, fraternity Zeta Beta Tau, whose members reflected a broad range of ethnicities and races, and majored in Sociology. He won the USC Trojans' community service award.

=== Statistics ===
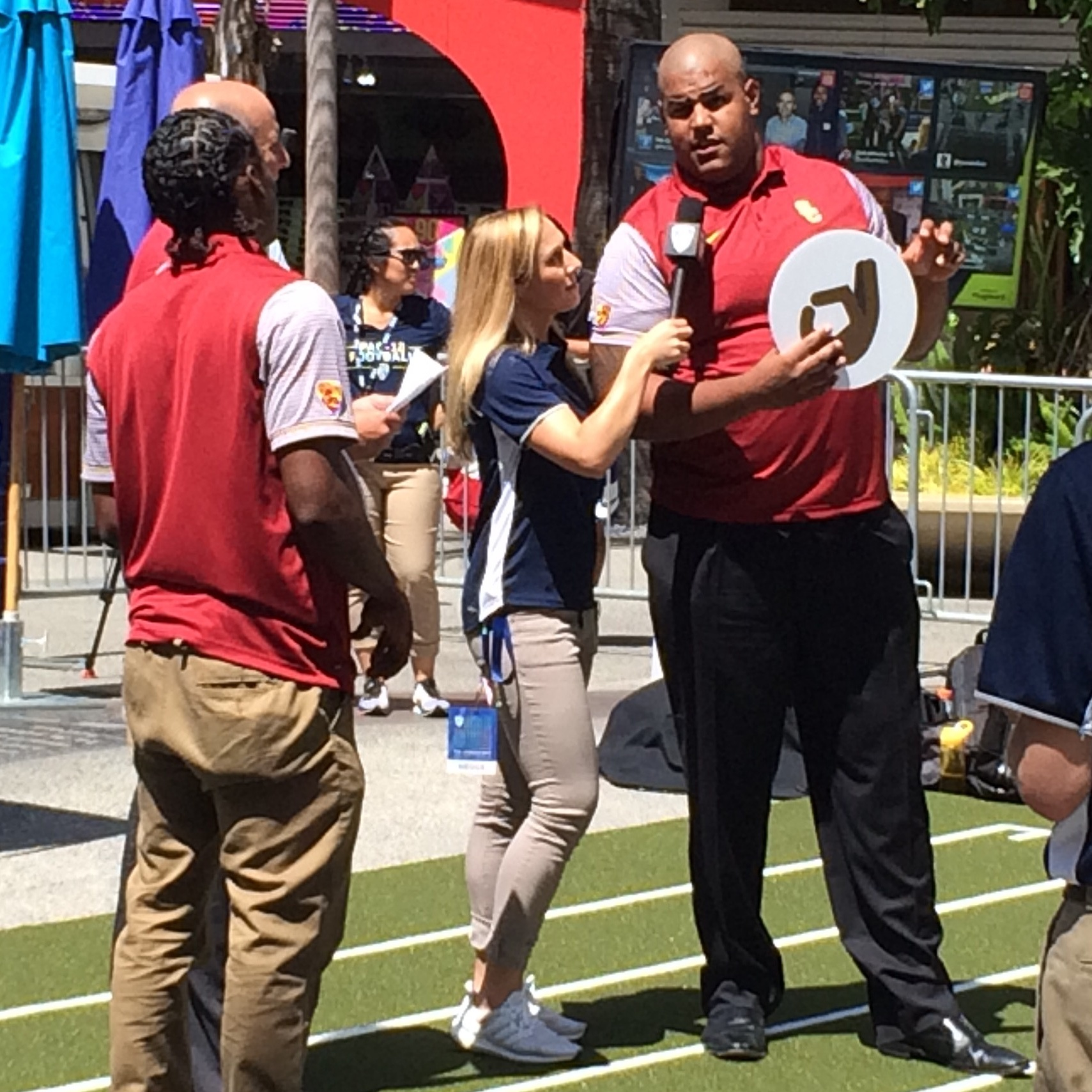
Banner at the 2016 Pac-12 Conference Media Days with then teammate Adoree' Jackson and head coach Clay Helton.

Year	Team	G	GS	Defense	
Year	Team	G	GS	Solo	Total
2013	USC	2	0	0	0
2014	USC	13	13	1	1
2015	USC	14	14	1	1
2016	USC	10	10	0	0
Career		39	37	2	2

== Professional career ==
Pre-draft measurables
Height	Weight	Arm length	Hand span	Wingspan	40-yard dash	10-yard split	20-yard split	20-yard shuttle	Three-cone drill	Vertical jump	Broad jump	Bench press
6 ft 8 3/8 in (2.04 m)	353 lb (160 kg)	34 7/8 in (0.89 m)	10 3/4 in (0.27 m)	6 ft 10 5/8 in (2.10 m)	5.58 s	1.92 s	3.19 s	5.21 s	8.31 s	23.5 in (0.60 m)	7 ft 8 in (2.34 m)	22 reps
All values from NFL Scouting Combine

=== Indianapolis Colts ===
Banner was selected by the Indianapolis Colts in the fourth round (137th overall) of the 2017 NFL draft. He became the first Chamorro selected in an NFL draft. He also was the tallest lineman drafted since Maryland's Jared Gaither (6-9, 340) in 2007. He was easily the biggest lineman on the Colts' roster. Rob Rang, a senior NFL draft analyst from NFLDraftScout.com, observed: "He is a massive, massive human being. To be that big, and also that light on his feet, is rare." The Colts had obtained the pick used to select Banner by trading tight end Dwayne Allen to the New England Patriots. Chuck Pagano, the Colts' coach, said: "It's like an eclipse. He's a giant. It's scary how big this guy is. He can barely fit into the locker room." After weeks of training camp, Banner made the Colts' 53-man roster. However, one day later, after other waived players from other teams became available, on September 3, 2017, Banner was waived by the Colts.

=== Cleveland Browns ===
On September 4, 2017, less than 24 hours after he was waived, Banner was claimed off waivers by the Cleveland Browns. Banner played in Cleveland's last 8 games, taking a combined 27 snaps on offense and 18 snaps on special teams. He was released on March 15, 2018.

=== Carolina Panthers ===
On March 16, 2018, Banner was claimed off waivers by the Carolina Panthers. He was waived by the Panthers on May 31, 2018.

=== Pittsburgh Steelers ===
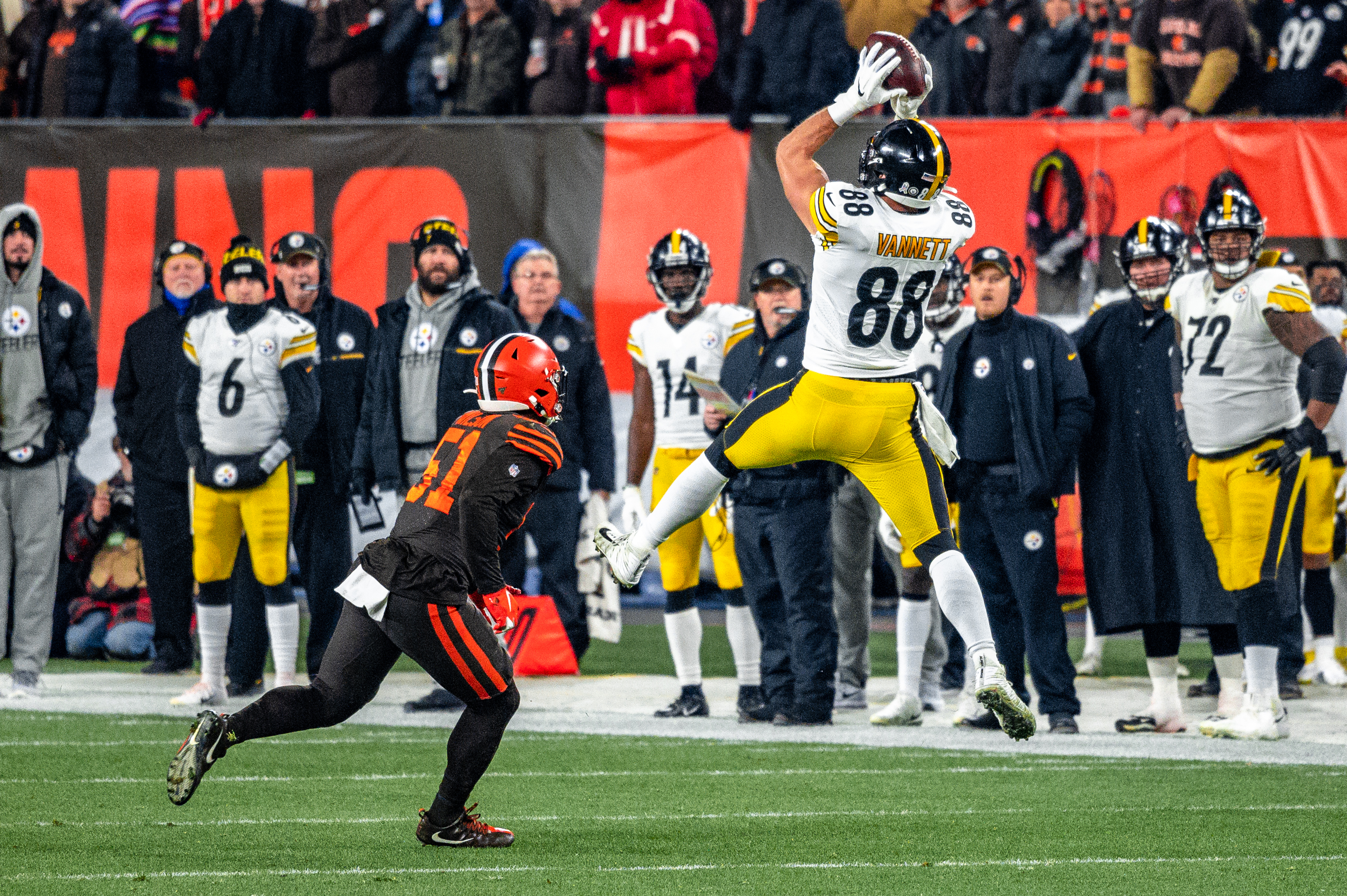
Banner (#72) on the sideline, 2019

Banner was signed by the Pittsburgh Steelers on August 12, 2018. He played 22% of offensive snaps for the Steelers, in 14 games (one start, in Week 12), in 2019. He played his first game for the Steelers on September 15 against the Seattle Seahawks, and made his first NFL start on November 24 against the Cincinnati Bengals. He had 24 pass protection reps, during which he did not allow a single pressure, quarterback sack, hurry, or quarterback hit. Banner became a cult hero who was featured in viral videos showing the team's largest player running downfield and flattening linebackers and defensive backs who got in his way, known to many fans as "No. 72" because he would be announced as "No. 72 is reporting as eligible" at home games, which was met with increasingly loud cheers and ovations throughout the season.

Banner re-signed with the Steelers for a one-year, $1.75 million contract on March 18, 2020. Paul Zeise of the Pittsburgh Post-Gazette opined that it was one of the Steelers' most underrated moves, as Banner could compete for right tackle as he "has good feet, he's athletic ... and he definitely has size.... He has a chance to be an excellent tackle if he keeps working at it.... run blocking is what he clearly does well." He entered the 2020 season as the Steelers starting right tackle. He suffered a torn ACL in Week 1 and was placed on season-ending injured reserve on September 16, 2020.

On March 18, 2021, Banner signed a two-year contract with the Steelers. He was placed on injured reserve on September 1, 2021. He was activated on October 16.

On March 16, 2022, Banner was released by the Steelers.

=== Houston Roughnecks ===
On March 6, 2025, Banner signed with the Houston Roughnecks of the United Football League (UFL).

=== Retirement ===
Banner announced his retirement in early 2026

== Personal life ==
Banner is married to Alexandra Banner, the lead writer for CNN's daily morning newsletter, 5 Things. The offensive lineman proposed on Mount Washington in Pittsburgh, Pennsylvania in December 2021.

Banner created the B3Foundation in 2017. It supports students in Guam, Tacoma, Washington, and Los Angeles both academically and athletically.

Banner posted an emotional video in response to an anti-Semitic Instagram post by fellow NFL player DeSean Jackson on Twitter, becoming one of the first NFL players to speak out on the issue. He received a great deal of praise for speaking out in the video, which has been viewed more than 790,000 times. In the video he explains that his friends from USC taught him about the Jewish community. He was a member of Zeta Beta Tau, a historically Jewish fraternity, and credits his fraternity brothers with sharing their families' experiences as part of his learning about the Jewish community. He said: "We need to understand that Jewish people deal with the same amount of hate and similar hardships and hard times. I'm not trying to get emotional right now but I want to preach to the Black and Brown community that we need to uplift them and put our arms around them just as much. When we talk about Black Lives Matter and talk about elevating ourselves, we can't do that while stepping on the back of other people to elevate ourselves. Change your heart, put your arm around people, and let's all uplift each other." He added: "We shouldn't be blind to other groups' history ... and other stuff they have gone through, some of the things that have set them back. If you don't know what the Holocaust is, you're really just failing yourself."

Banner's words gained traction on social media, and he received messages from people who felt the impact of his words on a personal level, sharing that his message made them cry. One donor, Stephen Feingold, the grandson of a Jewish immigrant from Lithuania who lived in Mississippi, in the 1910s purchased a cotton farm based on share cropping, the way that the South continued its racist policies after the Civil War. Feingold stated that he felt a moral obligation to give money to help the black community.

Banner's B3 Foundation, which supports Black and Brown youth in Tacoma, Los Angeles, and Guam, quickly received an outpouring of support, receiving more than $60,000 in donations, most in increments of $18, a Jewish tradition honoring the numeric value assigned to Hebrew letters that mean "life" (chai). Banner said: "It's just really, really powerful to know that in response to sticking my neck out, they have not only put their arm around me and said, 'We appreciate it. We got your back as well'. I'm ready for that challenge, to be able to stand in solidarity with the Jewish community as I am also trying to uplift my own through the Black Lives Matter, and the Black and brown people." Jews across the nation invited him to Shabbat dinners, and a number sent him fresh baked challah bread in the mail. He said: "I made the video to defend my friends. I didn't expect the whole Jewish community to have my back." He added: "I'm talking to rabbis and going downtown to the Tree of Life synagogue that had the shooting, to look at the kids and say, 'Hey, I got your back.' That's my job, as Zach Banner, moving forward."
