= William Leach =

William Leach may refer to:

- William Elford Leach (1791–1836), English zoologist and marine biologist
- William Leach (politician) (1870–1949), British Labour Party politician, minister in the first Labour government
- William Turnbull Leach (1805–1886), Canadian clergyman and academic
- William Leach (canoeist) (born 1946), American sprint canoer
- William Leach (cricketer, born 1851) (1851–1932), English cricketer
- William Leach (cricketer, born 1883) (1883–1969), English cricketer
- William Leach (Canadian Army officer) (1942–2015)
- William Leach (historian), American historian
