= Edward Leech =

Edward Leech may refer to:

- Edward Leech (MP) (1572–1652), English politician
- Edward O. Leech (1850–1900), director of the United States Mint

== See also ==
- Edward Leach (disambiguation)
