= John Leach =

John Leach is the name of:

- John Leach (judge) (1760–1834), English judge
- John Leach (Royal Navy officer) (1894–1941), Royal Navy captain
- John Albert Leach (1870–1929), Australian ornithologist
- Johnny Leach (1922–2014), British table tennis player
- John Leach (MP), British Member of the UK Parliament for West Surrey (1832)
- John Leach (footballer) (1866–1931), English footballer
- John Leach (cricketer) (1846–1893), English cricketer
- John Leach (studio potter) (1939–2021)

== See also ==
- John Leech (disambiguation)
