= Murder of Kimberly Leach =

1978 child murder in Florida, United States

Kimberly Leach
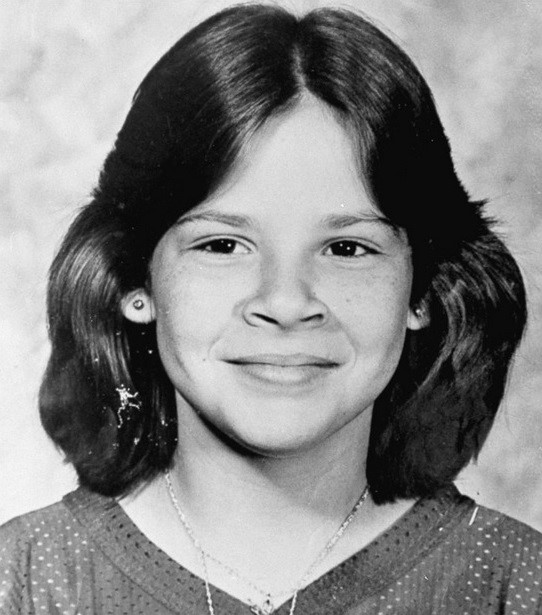
- Kimberly Leach, c. 1978
- Born: Kimberly Dianne Leach; October 28, 1965; Lake City, Columbia County, Florida, U.S.
- Died: February 9, 1978 (aged 12); Live Oak, Suwannee County, Florida, U.S.
- Cause of death: Homicidal violence to neck region. Possible strangulation accompanied by one or more penetrative wound
- Body discovered: April 7, 1978
- Resting place: Memorial Cemetery, Lake City, Florida, U.S. 30.19376°N 82.64738°W (approximate)

Kimberly Diane Leach (October 28, 1965 – February 9, 1978) was a 12-year-old American student in the seventh grade who was kidnapped from her school and subsequently murdered by serial killer Ted Bundy (November 24, 1946 – January 24, 1989) on February 9, 1978, in Lake City, Florida. Her remains were found on April 7, approximately 30 mi (48 km) west of Lake City.

Only weeks before Leach's murder, Bundy escaped from jail in Aspen while awaiting a murder trial and fled to Florida. On the day of Leach's disappearance, multiple eyewitnesses came forward and claimed they saw a white van circling around the school, and that they saw an adult man leading a young girl to the van and driving off. Bundy was arrested six days later in Pensacola for driving a stolen car and attempting to evade a police officer, and was quickly connected to Leach's disappearance.

Her mummified remains were discovered nearly two months later in an abandoned hog shed approximately 30 mi (48 km) west of Lake City. In 1980, Bundy was eventually convicted of Leach's kidnapping and murder, for which he was executed on January 24, 1989. Despite years of denial, on the eve of his execution, Bundy confessed to killing Leach.

== Background ==
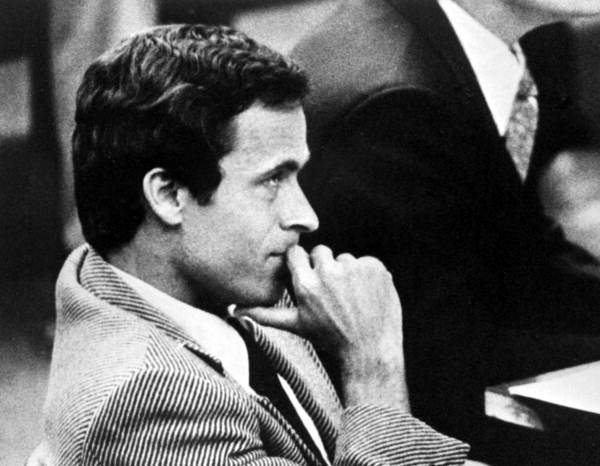
Ted Bundy in 1979

Ted Bundy is believed to have murdered at least 30 young women between 1974 and 1978, across several states, including Washington, Oregon, Utah, Colorado, Idaho and Florida. His modus operandi typically consisted of luring his victims to his Volkswagen Beetle while wearing an arm sling or cast under false pretext; such as helping him carry books or load a sailboat, before rendering them unconscious, often by bludgeoning them with a crowbar, then driving them to a pre-selected secluded area to be sexually assaulted and killed. Bundy frequently revisited his victims' bodies to perform further acts of necrophilia.

=== 1974 ===
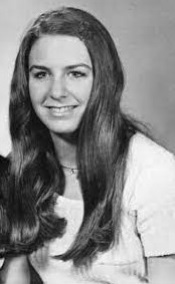
Lynda Ann Healy, Bundy's first known fatal victim

Beginning in early 1974, young women began disappearing at an alarming rate in Washington, starting with 21-year-old UW undergraduate Lynda Ann Healy in Seattle on February 1, followed by 19-year-old Evergreen student Donna Gail Manson in Olympia on March 12 and 18-year-old Susan Elaine Rancourt in Ellensburg on April 17. On May 6, 21-year-old Oregon State University student Roberta Kathleen Parks vanished in Corvallis, followed by 22-year-old Brenda Carol Ball in Burien on June 1, and 18-year-old Georgann Hawkins in Seattle on the night of June 11. The Washington disappearances ultimately culminated on July 14, when two women–23-year-old Janice Ann Ott and 19-year-old Denise Marie Naslund–vanished within four hours at Lake Sammamish State Park. The disappearances of Ott and Naslund generated significant media frenzy, as witnesses came forward stating they were approached by a man with his arm in a sling, asking them to help him load his sailboat onto his car. They all claimed he introduced himself as "Ted" and had a slight British accent.

In the summer of 1974, Bundy moved to Salt Lake City as a law student at the University of Utah, where, over a span of five weeks, he murdered four more victims: 16-year-old Nancy Wilcox in Holladay, 17-year-old Melissa Smith in Midvale, 17-year-old Laura Ann Aime in Lehi, and 17-year-old Debra Jean Kent in Bountiful. Several hours prior to Kent's disappearance, Bundy also kidnapped 18-year-old Carol DaRonch in Murray by impersonating a police officer, though DaRonch managed to escape from his car and flag an oncoming vehicle.

=== 1975 ===
In 1975, Bundy murdered another five victims: three in Colorado, one in Idaho, and another in Utah. On January 12, he murdered 23-year-old Caryn Campbell, a nurse from Dearborn, Michigan in a Wildwood Inn in Snowmass Village as she vacationed with her fiancé and two children. She disappeared after taking the elevator up to their room as her family waited for her in vain in the hotel lobby. Two months later on March 15, Bundy abducted and murdered 26-year-old Julie Cunningham in Vail, Colorado, then on April 6, he kidnapped 24-year-old Denise Oliverson from Grand Junction and killed her in a secluded location. A month later, on May 6, 12-year-old Lynette Dawn Culver vanished in Pocatello, Idaho. Bundy later confessed to abducting the girl and killing her in his motel room. On the night of June 27, 15-year-old Susan Curtis disappeared in Provo, Utah as she walked home from a banquet. Although Curtis's body was never found, Bundy confessed to killing her on the eve of his execution.

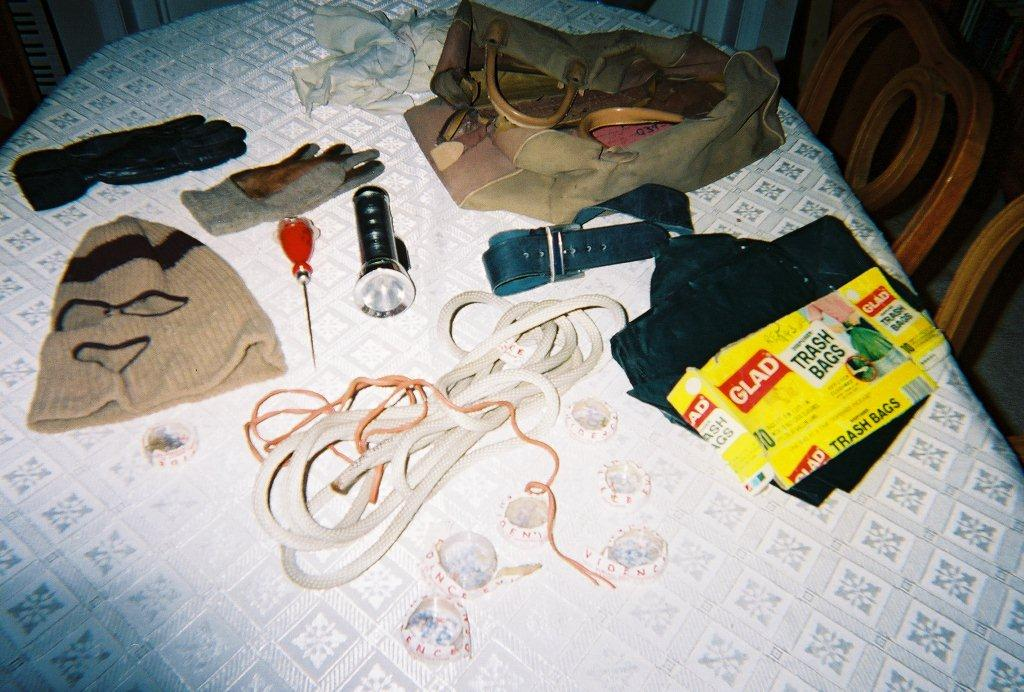
Items found in Bundy's car following his arrest in 1975

Bundy was first arrested in the early hours of August 16, 1975, in Granger by Utah Highway Patrol Sergeant Bob Hayward, for evading an officer. Hayward's suspicions about Bundy only increased when he discovered the passenger's seat of Bundy's car missing and when he found what he initially thought was a burglary kit inside Bundy's gym bag, containing rope, a ski mask, a pair of gloves, a crowbar, a panty hose with holes cut out for eyes and nose, one ice pick, and a pair of handcuffs. On October 2, Bundy was charged with the aggravated kidnapping of Carol DaRonch after she identified him in a line-up. By this point, the sheriffs from neighboring counties, including those in Washington, suspected Bundy of being responsible for the string of murders of the young women in 1974.

=== 1976 ===
Due to the heightened media presence at the trial, Bundy requested a bench trial, which began on February 23 and concluded a week later. The case of the prosecution primarily relied on the testimony of Carol DaRonch and Bob Hayward. On March 1, Bundy was found guilty of aggravated kidnapping and was subsequently sentenced to 1 to 15 years in prison. In early October 1976, Bundy was charged by Colorado authorities with the murder of Caryn Campbell.

=== 1977 ===
In late January 1977, Bundy was extradited to Colorado to stand trial for the murder of Campbell, where he was held in Garfield County Jail in Glenwood Springs. He had pleaded not guilty and acted as his own attorney. The preliminary hearing for Bundy's trial started in early April 1977 and lasted for several weeks, before Bundy escaped during court recess on June 7 by leaping out of the second-floor window of the Pitkin County Courthouse and running to the mountains. He was captured six days later in Aspen after stealing a car. Exhausted and hungry, Bundy spent the six days wandering aimlessly in the wilderness, before returning to town early on June 13. Six months later, Bundy made his second escape on the night of December 30, by breaking through the ceiling and then into a jailer's closet, stealing his clothes and walking out of the front gate. After driving a stolen car to Denver, he flew to Chicago and then traveled to Ann Arbor, Michigan, by train.

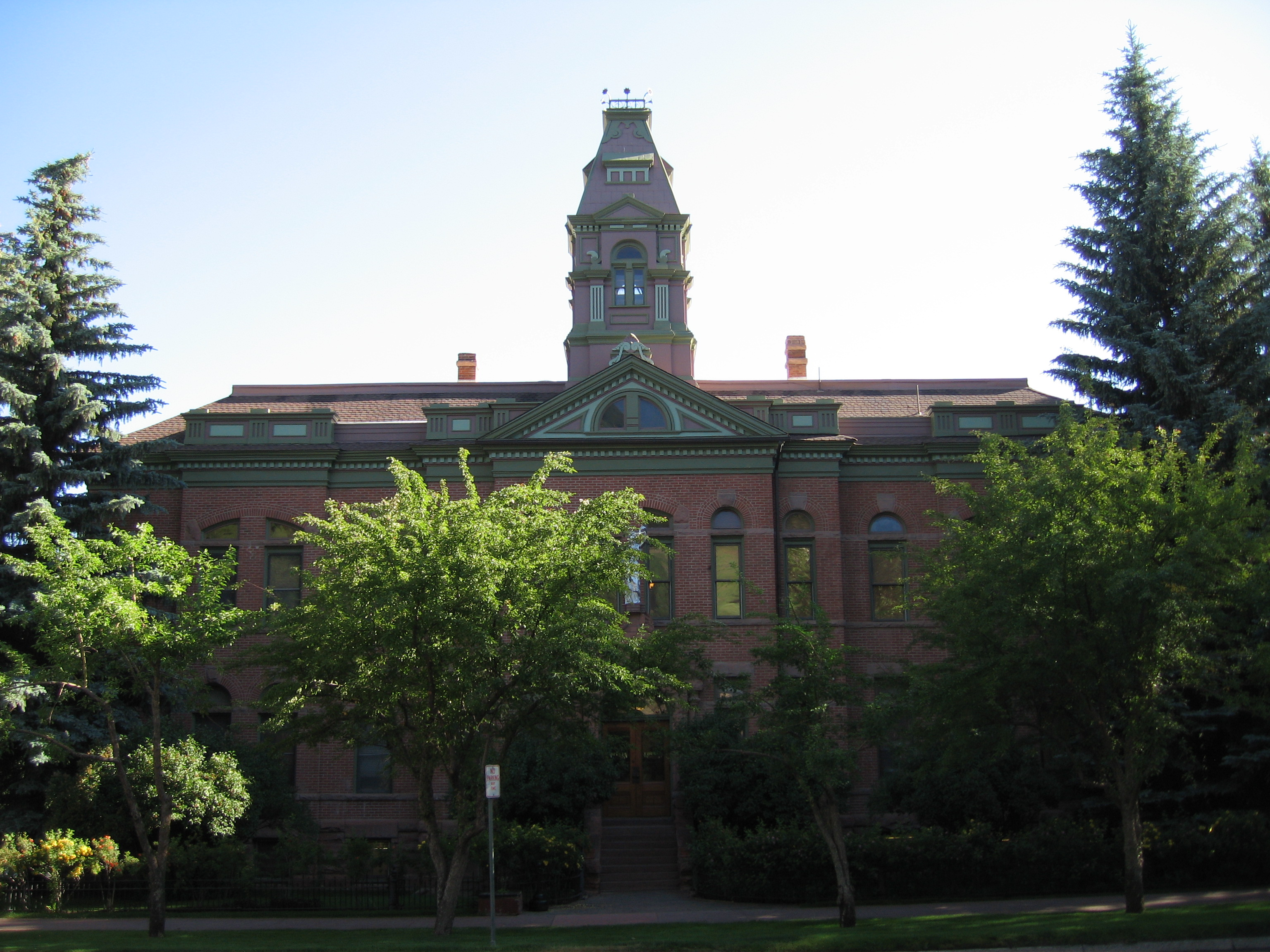
The Pitkin County Courthouse, from which Bundy escaped in June 1977

=== 1978 ===
After arriving in Michigan early on January 1, 1978, Bundy drove a stolen car to Atlanta, from where he traveled by bus to Florida, reaching Tallahassee on January 8. Seven days after arriving in Tallahassee, in the early hours of January 15, Bundy entered the Chi Omega Sorority House through a rear door armed with a wooden log he had taken from a woodpile outside. He bludgeoned 21-year-old Margaret Bowman and 20-year-old Lisa Levy to death and severely injured two more sorority sisters before fleeing the house, after which he entered a house on Dunwoody Street, located approximately four blocks west of Chi Omega, and then bludgeoned the sleeping 23-year-old Cheryl Thomas with the same weapon.

The attacks in Tallahassee had sparked a moral panic, particularly amongst female college students, who were advised to walk in groups and to lock their doors. Three weeks later, Bundy stole a white van from the parking lot of the Florida State University campus and initially headed for Jacksonville, where he attempted to kidnap a teenage victim, but to no avail, before driving to Lake City, where he spent the night of February 8 in a Holiday Inn.

== Murder ==
=== Disappearance ===
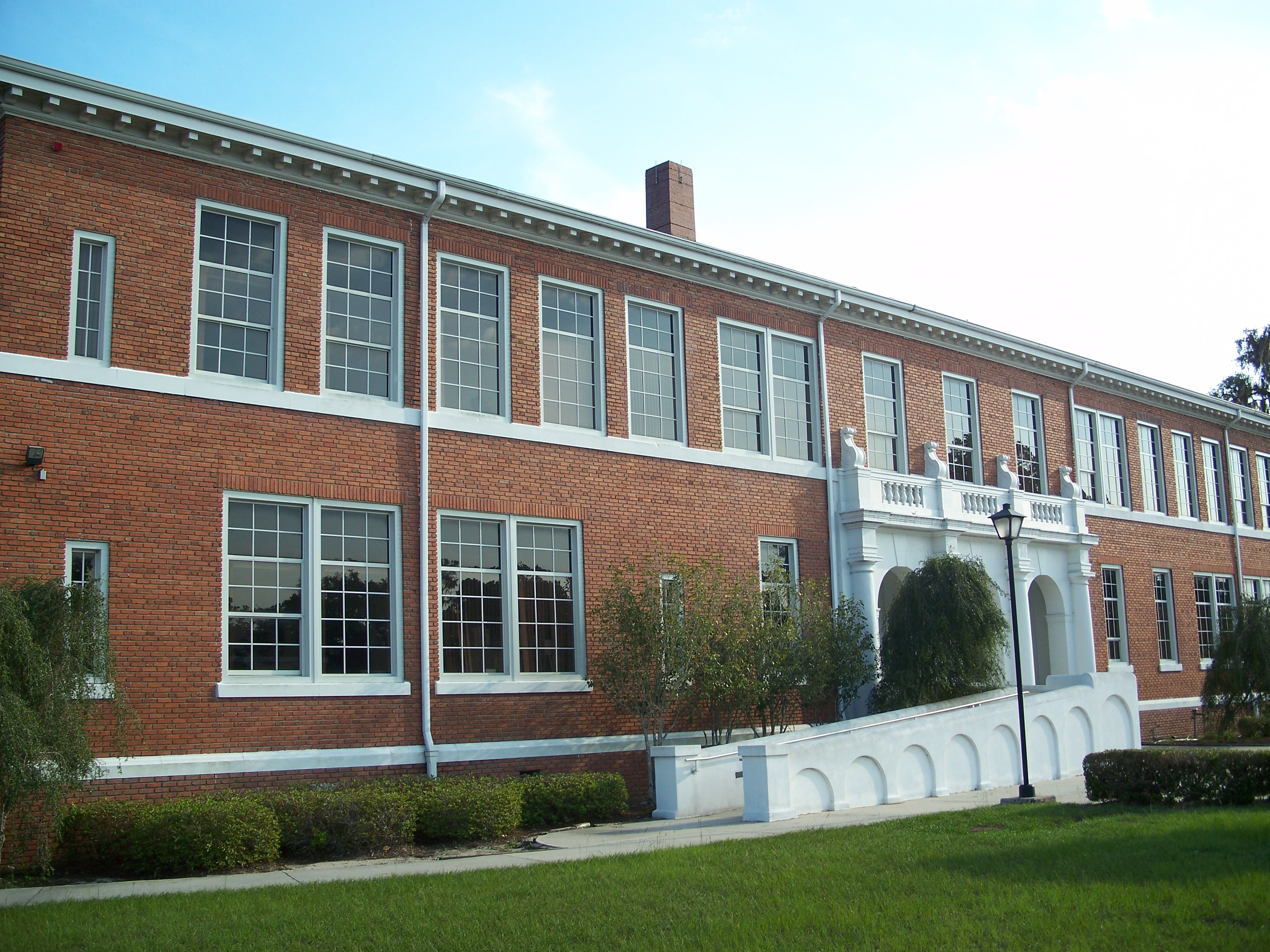
Columbia County High School (formerly Lake City Junior High School), from where Leach was abducted

Kimberly Leach was driven to Lake City Junior High School on the morning of February 9, 1978, by her mother Freda. She was wearing a royal blue football jersey – which bore a number "83" and her name above – blue jeans, and a fur coat, due to the cold and rainy weather. After briefly meeting her friend, 12-year-old Elaine Hendricks, Leach left for her first period as the first bell rang, planning to meet Hendricks again the next period during P.E. As the first period began, Leach was sent back to her homeroom to retrieve her purse that she had left there. A student later reported seeing a white male in his mid-30s outside of the school, slim and with his hair unkempt.

Leach was headed for the homeroom to retrieve her purse, but she never made it there. By the end of the day, the teachers realized Leach had essentially vanished during first period and called Leach's mother to ask her if she had seen her at all that day, initially suspecting Leach of skipping school. At approximately 2:30 p.m., Freda and her husband Tom drove to the school and picked up Leach's older brother Michael. The three then searched the school grounds together with the help of the assistant principal, but to no avail. After Leach had not returned by 5:30 p.m., Freda called the police.

=== Investigation ===
The investigation commenced on February 10, the same day Bundy was officially added to the FBI's Ten Most Wanted List. The disappearance caused an uproar in Lake City and had subsequently become the main subject in the media in the following weeks. Police Chief Paul Philpot addressed the media on February 14, stating they were "working around the clock following every lead", that a search party had been formed, and that they'd discredited the possibility that Leach ran away from home. The following day, Sheriff Glenn Bailey announced a $500 USD reward for information about Leach, as the search party completed a third sweep around the school. On February 16, Philpot assigned the case to a six-man investigation team, erroneously telling the media all the leads they'd received so far "had been futile".

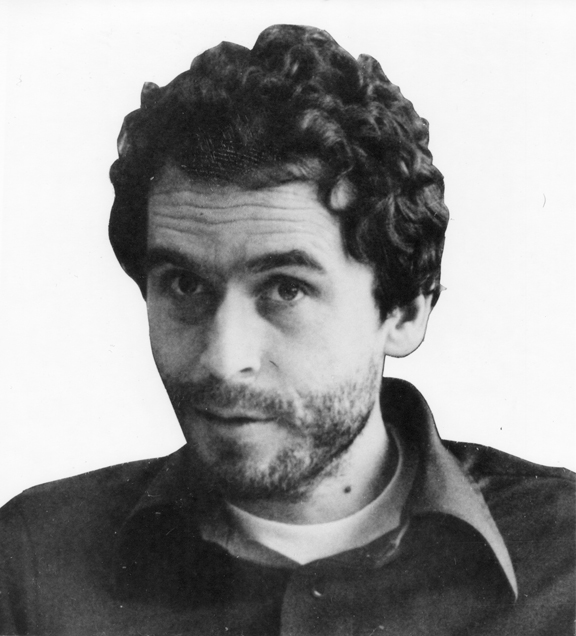
FBI's photo of Bundy after he was placed on the Ten Most Wanted list in 1978

During the investigation, multiple eyewitnesses came forward and claimed they saw Leach on February 9. The crossing guard near the junior high school, Clinch Edenfield told the authorities he noticed a white van driving slowly on Duval Street and "staring long and hard" at the school at approximately 7:30 a.m. He stated that he saw the van again 30 minutes later and then again at 8:15 a.m. Each of these times the driver was staring hard at the school, and he looked to be between 30 and 35 years with medium build. Lieutenant Andy Anderson, an EMT with the city's fire department, claimed that at approximately 8:30 a.m., he saw a white van blocking the traffic westbound on Duval Street before a man in his mid-30s emerged, leading a young girl to the passenger side of the van. Anderson said the man appeared to be clean-shaven and had wavy brown hair, and the girl appeared to be 12 or 13, with long brown hair parted in the middle and a football jersey with the number "63" or "83" on the back. Anderson also said the girl appeared to be distraught and upset. However, Anderson, not wanting to get involved, waited six months before reporting the sight to the authorities. Another eyewitness, Jacqueline Moore, came forward in mid-February and stated she was heading eastbound on U.S. 90 when a white van "nearly ran her off the road". She claimed that the driver, who appeared to be a white male, was looking down at something, with his jaw slack and head bobbing repeatedly.

In the early hours of February 15, Bundy – en route to Alabama – was pulled over in Pensacola by Patrolman David Lee for driving with his headlights off. After noticing that the car was stolen, Lee ordered Bundy out of the car and attempted to restrain him when Bundy punched Lee in the face, knocking him off balance, before running away. Lee followed closely, aiming his revolver at Bundy while shouting at him to stop running. After firing a single shot and seeing Bundy collapse, Lee believed he had incapacitated him, but as Lee approached him, Bundy grabbed Lee's gun in an attempt to disarm him. During the brief struggle, Lee pistol-whipped Bundy three times and managed to restrain him. During the drive to the police station, Bundy told Lee: "I wish you had just killed me."

Following his arrest, Bundy identified himself as "Kenneth Misner", and was initially interrogated about the credit cards and documents belonging to Kenneth Misner that they found in his possession. However, when they started asking him about Lake City and Tallahassee, Bundy revealed his real identity to the investigators in exchange for a phone call to his girlfriend in Seattle. Although he didn't confess to killing Leach, the investigators were confident Bundy had killed her. When implored by Detective Norman Chapman to help them find her body, Bundy replied: "I cannot do that to you because the site is too horrible to look at". The Lake City press closely followed the news of Bundy's arrest, and public interest increased after Philpot told the press that Bundy had stayed at a Lake City motel the night before Leach's disappearance.

On February 21, Philpot addressed the media once again, in reference to Bundy's connection to Leach, he said that Bundy had used a credit card to check out of the motel on the morning of February 9. By this point, Bundy was already linked to the attempted abduction of the teenage girl in Jacksonville. Around this time, Sheriff Ken Katsaris became involved in the Leach case, telling the media the Florida Department of Law Enforcement (FDLE) Crime Lab in Tallahassee was conducting tests in relation to the Leach case, and that they found blood inside the white van which had been connected to Bundy. They'd also discovered that sand was tossed on the large bloodstain found on the van's carpet; the investigators reasoned that, after killing Leach, Bundy tried to conceal the bloodstain by covering it with sand. This also gave them the idea that the soil had come from a river flood plain.

=== Discovery of body ===
At approximately 12:36 p.m. on April 7, 1978, a Florida Highway Patrol trooper observed a run-down hog shed near the Suwannee River State Park during a routine search for Leach and then, after approaching the shed closer, he also noticed a shoe resembling to the one worn by Leach, as well as a human leg and a bone. Leach's body was completely nude except for a turtleneck; the rest of her clothing was laid right next to her body. The autopsy report was finished on the morning of April 8 by Dr. Peter Lipkovic. Due to the extensive decomposition of the corpse, it was difficult to establish Leach's exact cause of death, aside from Lipkovic's vague description of "homicidal violence around the neck area."

Although Lipkovic was unable to establish Leach's cause of death nor the instrument used to kill her, the wounds inflicted to Leach's groin and neck led him to believe her death was at least partly accompanied by "copious bleeding", due to the fact that the flesh on her neck and groin was missing, meaning whatever instrument was used to kill her had torn the flesh. Ultimately, the medical examiners concluded that Leach was raped at least twice before having her genitals mutilated and her throat slashed. This theory was corroborated by the fact that a man named John Farhat claimed to have sold Bundy a large hunting knife on the evening of February 8.

== Legal proceedings ==
Although Leach's body had been discovered, the investigators could not yet connect Bundy to her murder. In April 1978, the Columbia County prosecutors, led by George R. Dekle, Sr., who were prosecuting Bundy for the Leach murder, started cooperating with the Leon County prosecutors who were trying Bundy for the Chi Omega killings and the Dunwoody Street assault. They agreed that Bundy was to stand trial for the Tallahassee crimes first, which was to be held in Miami due to heightened media presence back in Tallahassee, shortly after which the indictment for Leach's murder would follow.

As Bundy prepared to undergo trial in Miami, the Columbia County task force sought to connect Bundy to Leach's abduction and murder, which included taping a statement from Farhat, the owner of a Jacksonville sporting goods store, who claimed he sold Bundy a Buck knife for $26.00 on February 8. The investigators also matched Leach's blood to the bloodstain found in the van. Similarly, they matched the semen found on Leach's panties to Bundy's blood type. The most convincing piece of evidence, however, was the fiber examination of the van's carpet in comparison to Leach's clothing; the investigators ended up finding numerous fibers all over articles of Leach's clothing which matched the van, including her socks, jeans, bra and her purse.

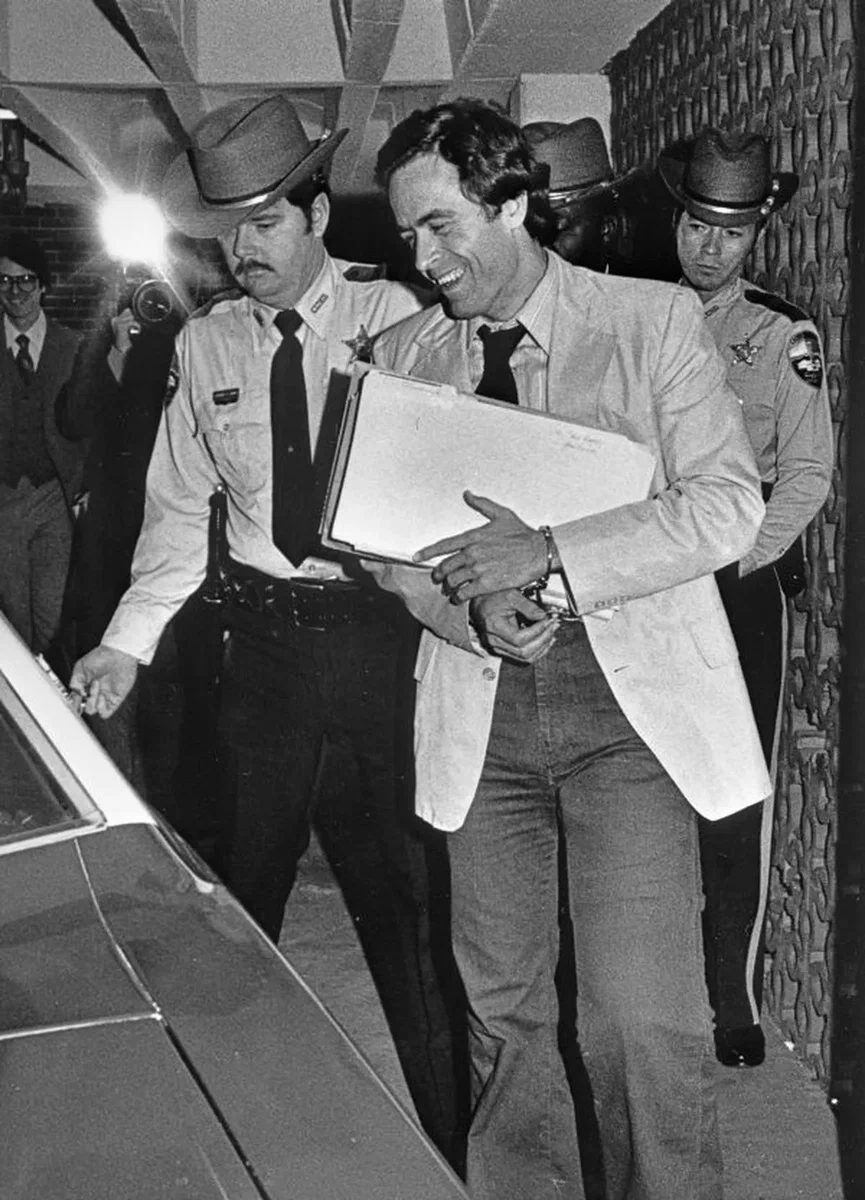
Bundy departing a preliminary hearing in 1979

Bundy's trial in Miami concluded on July 24, 1979; he was found guilty on all counts, including murder, attempted murder and burglary and was subsequently given two death sentences a week later. The pretrial hearings for Bundy's trial for the kidnapping and murder of Leach, which would go down in Orlando, started in September 1979.

=== Trial ===
Bundy's trial for the kidnapping and murder of Kimberly Leach, although initially scheduled to take place in Live Oak commenced in Orlando on January 7, 1980. During the opening statements, Bundy's lawyer Julius Africano spent most of his time finding weaknesses in the prosecution's case, calling their case a "chain of circumstances", while the prosecutors had Freda Leach, Kimberly's mother, testify about the day of her daughter's disappearance, before calling Jacques Moore, one of their three eyewitnesses who saw Bundy near Lake City Junior High School on the day of Leach's disappearance. The other two were Anderson and Edenfield.

During the second week of the trial, Dr. Peter Lipkovic, who performed Leach's autopsy, testified for the prosecution and was cross-examined by Africano, who attempted to undermine his conclusion that Leach's death was caused by "homicidal violence in the neck region." The following day, David Lee, the Pensacola officer who arrested Bundy in February 1978, and Norman Chapman, a Pensacola detective who interrogated Bundy following his arrest testified and were also cross-examined by Africano, who unsuccessfully tried to suppress Lee's testimony, which was detrimental to their case.

The prosecution eventually gained the upper hand when they had one of the investigators who had conducted the fiber examinations testify to the fact that the fibers matching the van's carpet were found across multiple articles of Leach's clothing, and also when she showed Leach's turtleneck that was taken off of her body, revealing a large bloodstain on the neck and chest of the shirt. The prosecution did the same with the van's carpet and its large bloodstain. The investigator finished her testimony by saying that it was "probable" that Bundy's clothes came in contact with Leach's clothes, that it was "very probable" that Bundy's clothes came in contact with the van's carpet and that it was "extremely probable" that Leach's clothes came in contact with the van's carpet according to her fiber examination.

The state rested their case that afternoon, as the defense tried to get Bundy acquitted, going as far as claiming Bundy was in another white van that day. During the closing arguments, the prosecution showed a chart they designed which connected Bundy to Leach, which included the fact that Bundy bought gas in Lake City on February 7, the fact that he'd spent the night in Lake City on February 8. It also included the blue wool fibers found on Leach's jeans which matched the ones on the blue blazer Bundy was wearing at the time and the traces of semen found on Leach's panties. Bundy was ultimately found guilty on both counts after seven hours of deliberation.

The sentencing phase for the trial was set for February 9, 1980, on the second anniversary of Leach's murder, during which Bundy was sentenced to death for a third time in total. After being sentenced to death, Bundy rose from his seat and exclaimed loudly: "Tell the jury they were wrong!" During the sentencing phase, Bundy, while acting as his own attorney, exchanged vows with his friend Carole Ann Boone while she was on the stand, and the two were officially married.

== Aftermath and execution ==
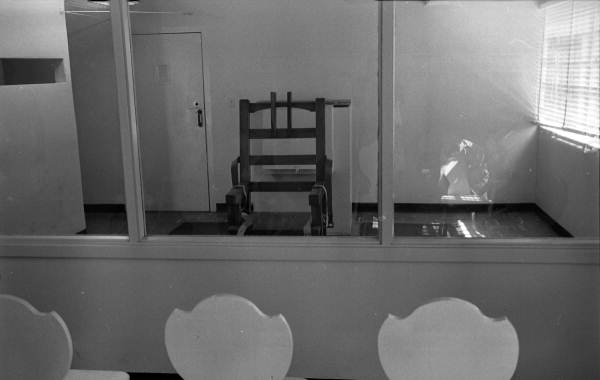
Florida State Prison's electric chair, where Bundy was executed for Leach's murder.

Throughout the years, Bundy appealed both of his sentences multiple times, albeit unsuccessfully. Numerous journalists came to Florida State Prison to speak to Bundy on death row throughout the 1980s, including detective Robert Keppel, Stephen Michaud, Hugh Aynesworth and FBI profiler William Hagmeier. In the mid-1980s, Bundy started confessing to the crimes after years of denial, eventually starting to withhold vital information regarding the location of the bodies to delay his execution, known as "Ted's bones-for-time strategy".

After his appeals were exhausted and after several setbacks and delays, on January 17, 1989, Bundy's final death warrant was signed by Governor Rob Martinez. Between January 20 and January 23, Bundy conducted a series of interviews, including one with Keppel, during which he confessed to 30 murders across seven states and, for the first time ever, spoke about his necrophilia, but refused to talk about killing Leach. On January 23, hours before his execution, Bundy conducted a taped interview with Reverend James Dobson, during which he blamed pornography for "shaping the personality" which urged him to kill.

Bundy's last-minute clemency request was rejected, and he was executed by electric chair at 7:16 a.m. on January 24, 1989, for the murder of Kimberly Leach.

== See also ==
- Ted Bundy
- Murder of Georgann Hawkins
- List of murdered American children

== General and cited sources ==
- Sullivan, Kevin M. (2009). The Bundy Murders: A Comprehensive History (Paperback ed.). Jefferson, North Carolina: McFarland and Co. ISBN 978-0-7864-4426-7.
- Dekle, George R. Sr. (2011). The Last Murder: The Investigation, Prosecution, and Execution of Ted Bundy (Hardcover ed.). Santa Barbara, California: Praeger (Imprint of ABC-CLIO). ISBN 978-0-313-39743-1.
- Rule, Ann (2009). The Stranger Beside Me (Paperback; updated 2009 ed.). New York City: Pocket Books. ISBN 978-1-4165-5959-7.
