= Donnington Wood =

Donnington Wood is a suburb of Donnington in the borough of Telford and Wrekin and ceremonial county of Shropshire, England.

First-class cricketer and coal miner Enoch Tranter (1842–1910), player for Lancashire, died at Donnington Wood.

Jockey Sir Gordon Richards was born in Donnington Wood at Ivy Row, part of a new demolished row of cottages on whose site are the apartment blocks 'Gordon House' and 'Richards House'. A local pub in nearby Donnington was named after him: "The Champion Jockey". This was replaced firstly by a Netto supermarket which itself in 2011 became a Morrisons' supermarket, which then turned into a Home Bargains shop in 2015.
