= Mary Leach =

Mary Leach may refer to:

- Mary Ethel Leach (1850/1851–1936), British politician
- Mary Frances Leach (1858–1939), American chemist
- Mary Jane Leach (born 1949), American composer
