= John Leech =

John Leech may refer to:

- John Leech (jurist) (fl. 1330s), English medieval professor of canon law
- John Leech (caricaturist) (1817–1864), English caricaturist and illustrator
- John Henry Leech (1862–1900), British entomologist
- John Leech (mathematician) (1926–1992), British mathematician, discoverer of the Leech Lattice
- John Leech (politician) (born 1971), British Liberal Democrat Councillor in Manchester and former Member of Parliament
- John Leech (art dealer), founder of New Zealand's John Leech Gallery

== See also ==
- John Leach (disambiguation)
