= Murder of Georgann Hawkins =

Victim of Ted Bundy (1955–1974)

Georgann Hawkins
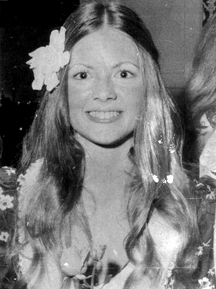
- Hawkins, pictured in 1974
- Born: August 20, 1955; Tacoma, Washington, U.S.
- Disappeared: June 11, 1974 (aged 18); Seattle, Washington, U.S.
- Status: Missing for 52 years, 5 months and 6 days; presumed dead
- Education: Lakes High School; University of Washington
- Occupation: Student
- Height: 5 ft 2 in (157 cm)
- Parent(s): Edith Hawkins and Warren B. Hawkins

Georgann Hawkins (August 20, 1955 – disappeared June 11, 1974) was an American college student from Tacoma, Washington, who disappeared from an alley behind her sorority house at the University of Washington in Seattle.

Serial killer Ted Bundy confessed to Hawkins's abduction and murder shortly before his 1989 execution. Bundy claimed that partial skeletal remains belonging to Hawkins were recovered from one of his many crime scenes on September 6, 1974. According to Bundy, the sections of Hawkins's body he had not buried were recovered in Issaquah alongside the bodies of two other victims he had murdered on July 14.

Bundy's statement regarding the identity of the partial skeletal remains being those of Georgann Hawkins has never been confirmed. Although Hawkins is presumed dead, she is still officially listed as a missing person and no public records indicate that she has been declared legally dead in absentia.

== Early life and education ==
Georgann Hawkins was born on August 20, 1955, in Tacoma, Washington. She was the second of two daughters born to Warren B. Hawkins and his wife, Edith "Edie" Hawkins. She and her older sister, Patti, were raised in an upper-middle class Episcopalian household in Sumner, Washington. As a child, Hawkins was reported to be a spirited, vivacious, and outgoing individual. Her mother later described her younger daughter as a "wiggle worm" who was unable to sit still and who had a talkative nature. These observations were well-documented in report cards that her parents received from her grade-school teachers. Adored by her peers, Hawkins's mother dubbed her "the Pied Piper". Her mother later recalled of her daughter, "she had quite a following but she was not the kind of person who stuck to one group or clique. She had friends among everybody, older than her and younger than her. She was a very self-confident little girl ... she wasn't vain, she wasn't arrogant and she wasn't snooty. That's why kids liked her."

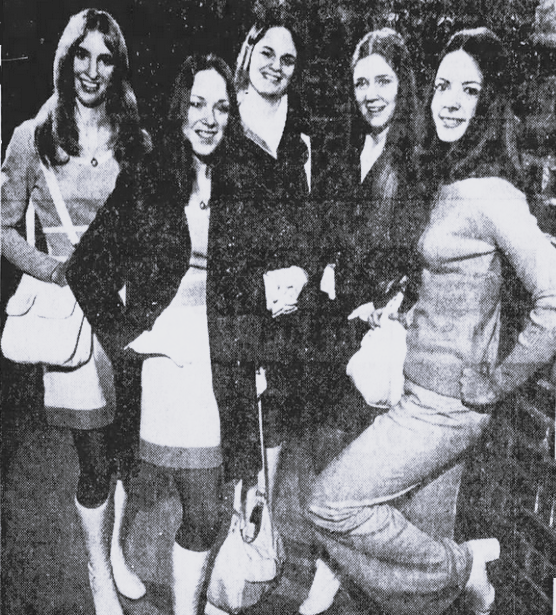
Hawkins (right), pictured in February 1973 at the annual Washington Daffodil Festival.

At one stage in her childhood, Hawkins had a brief bout with Osgood-Schlatter disease which left a few small bumps visible just below her patellae. Despite this, she was a star athlete and swam competitively throughout grade school and won numerous AAU swimming medals. She later transitioned to cheerleading as a teenager, and was a member of the Lakes High cheerleading squad for four consecutive years. In addition to being a star athlete, Hawkins was an honors student and maintained a straight A record throughout her school years. She was a graduate of Lakes High School in Lakewood, Washington, class of 1973.

During her senior years of 1972 and 1973, she was named a princess to the royal court of the annual Washington Daffodil Festival. As a Daffodil Princess, Hawkins traveled around the state of Washington with the other court princesses, regularly being featured in newspapers, attending concerts, meeting children, riding in parades, and signing autographs at charity events. A highlight for Hawkins was in the spring of 1973 where she made a speech addressing lawmakers at the Washington state Legislature.

== University of Washington ==
Hawkins's elder sister, Patti, attended Central Washington University in Ellensburg, 120.6 miles away from their hometown of Tacoma. When Georgann announced her intentions to enroll at college, her mother did not want her to move as far afield as her elder sister had. At her mother's request, Georgann enrolled at the University of Washington in Seattle, which was only 30 miles from her hometown. Hawkins's parents paid for her tuition, books, room and board; she worked all summer to pay for other expenditures, and occasionally returned to her family home at weekends. Georgann last saw her parents on the Mother's Day weekend of 1974.

During her freshman year, Hawkins joined the on-campus sorority Kappa Alpha Theta. After her experiences as a Daffodil Princess and having observed the ongoing news media coverage of the hearings relating to the Watergate scandal, she formed aspirations of becoming either a broadcast journalist or possibly a television news anchor. She was looking into majoring in broadcast journalism around the time of her disappearance.

As had been the case while attending high school, Hawkins maintained a straight A record while studying at the University of Washington. She also enjoyed attending campus parties, dance formals, and Kappa Alpha Theta events, although she rarely walked around the campus alone at night. She also found a steady boyfriend, Marvin Gellatly, who was a member of the Beta Theta Pi fraternity.

By the spring of 1974, Hawkins had found a summer job in her hometown of Tacoma, which was set to commence on Monday June 17. The money Hawkins was to earn from this employment was intended to pay towards her second year of studies at the University of Washington. She is known to have discussed this employment with her parents shortly before her disappearance, and intended to return to her parents' home on June 13.

== Events of June 10–11, 1974 ==
On June 10, 1974, Hawkins went with a sorority sister to a party on campus, where the two drank a few mixed drinks. She did not stay at the event for too long as she intended to study for her upcoming Spanish finals, for which she had earlier expressed worry to her mother. Before leaving the party, she told her sorority sister that she was going to the Beta Theta Pi House to both say good night to her boyfriend and to pick up some revision notes from him.

The alleyway between the Beta Theta Pi and Kappa Alpha Theta sorority houses from where Hawkins encountered Ted Bundy in the early hours of June 11, 1974

While Hawkins was reportedly a cautious person, the area along the sorority houses had allegedly become familiar to her. The alley behind the houses was reportedly lit by streetlights approximately every ten feet, and there were generally people around that she knew. The fraternity house of Hawkins's boyfriend was six houses down from her sorority house—a distance of approximately 90 feet (27 m).

Hawkins arrived at the Beta Theta Pi House at approximately 12:30 a.m. on June 11; she is known to have remained in the company of her boyfriend for approximately half an hour. After retrieving the Spanish notes and saying good night to her boyfriend, Hawkins exited the fraternity house for the short walk to her sorority, Kappa Alpha Theta. One of the Betas, Duane Covey, heard the back door slam shut and stuck his head out the window; recognizing Hawkins, he called out "Hey George! What's happening?" The two talked for approximately two minutes, with Hawkins mentioning her upcoming Spanish exam. She then continued to walk towards her residence, jokingly shouting, "Adios!"

Hawkins was last seen wearing navy blue cotton bell-bottom pants (which had one button and were missing three), the waistline of which had been slightly reduced with a safety pin. She was also wearing a white backless T-shirt, a sheer red, white, and blue top, and white open-toed wedge sandals. Hawkins also had two rings: on her left middle finger, a rectangular black onyx ring with a small diamond in the center set in yellow gold; on her right ring finger, a cultured pearl ring with a slender gold band in a Tiffany setting.

Hawkins was also carrying a tan leather satchel-type purse with reddish stains. The contents of her purse included her large royal purple wallet, her school identification card, her checkbook from Seafirst Bank Lakewood Branch, a small quantity of cash, a mini hairbrush with black bristles, a bottle of Heaven Sent perfume, a small jar of Vaseline, and the Spanish notes she borrowed. Several weeks before her disappearance, Georgann had trimmed a few inches off her waist length brown hair (a routine cut to treat split ends) and her roommate reported that Hawkins's hair was approximately mid back length at the time she went missing. She had also spent a great deal of time lying in the sun in the weeks leading up to June 10, and her typically fair skin complexion had taken on a rather deep tone.

== Events prior to disappearance ==
In the months prior to Hawkins's disappearance, the state of Washington experienced a string of disappearances of young Caucasian women.

- February 1: Lynda Ann Healy (21), disappeared from her basement room in Seattle, Washington.
- March 12: Donna Gail Manson (19), vanished off The Evergreen State College campus in Olympia, Washington, while going to attend a jazz concert.
- April 17: Susan Elaine Rancourt (18), disappeared off Central Washington State College campus in Ellensburg, Washington, after leaving a dorm advisors meeting.
- May 6: Roberta Kathleen Parks (20), went missing from Oregon State University in Corvallis, Oregon, after leaving her dormitory to go meet friends at a coffee shop.
- June 1: Brenda Carol Ball (22), went missing after leaving the Flame Tavern in Burien, Washington.

The disappearances baffled law enforcement officials, and many questions began to arise concerning the connections between the cases. There were many similarities to the cases of missing women that the detectives noticed. The girls all shared the same basic physical characteristics of being young, attractive, slender, of Caucasian descent, with long hair that was parted in the middle. They were all also considered to be of more than average intelligence with some sort of gifted talent and came from stable backgrounds. During the times of their disappearances, they were all reported to have been wearing slacks and vanished in the hours of darkness within a week of a midterm or final at a local college or university. Strangely enough, there was also construction work being done on each girl's respective campus when she disappeared.

Lynda Ann Healy's case was the only one with physical evidence in the form of a blood stained mattress and nightgown. The timeline of Donna Gail Manson's last whereabouts was difficult to construct due to the fact that she was not reported missing for six days. This was because Manson often hitchhiked to nearby locales and could disappear for several days at a time without notice, and her peers initially believed that she decided to travel without sharing her plans beforehand. Manson was also depressed at the time of her disappearance, and law enforcement could not rule out the slim possibility that she may have left of her own account to commit suicide.

Susan Rancourt was also physically different from Lynda Ann Healy and Donna Manson, in that she had blonde hair that was just past her shoulders, in contrast to Healy who had waist-length chestnut colored hair, and Manson who had long dark brown hair down to the middle of her back.

Captain Herb Swindler was convinced that Roberta Parks's disappearance was linked to the others but other law enforcement officials doubted his claims, feeling that the city of Corvallis in Oregon was too distant for a victim of the perpetrator who prowled the campuses of Washington colleges. And although Parks had long hip-length hair that was parted in the middle, her hair color was ash blonde, while all the other girls (except for Susan Rancourt) were brunette or dark haired. Police also could not rule out the possibility that, like Donna Manson, Parks may have disappeared on her own account to commit suicide. It was a plausible theory as she had a history of mood swings, recently broke up with her boyfriend, was feeling homesick for her hometown in Lafayette, California, and two days before she went missing got into a verbal altercation with her father, who then had a near fatal heart attack that same day. The Willamette River, which was near the city of Corvallis, was briefly seen as a place of interest where Parks's body might have been found, in the event that she had chosen to end her life by throwing herself off the river bridge. But after being dragged, the Willamette was ruled out.

Brenda Ball was also not reported missing until after Hawkins's disappearance. Like Donna Manson, Ball was somewhat of an adventurous spirit and may have taken off on a whim. With no bodies found, very few clues to go on, and given the limits of forensic technology at the time, the disappearances became more complex to piece together.

== Investigation ==
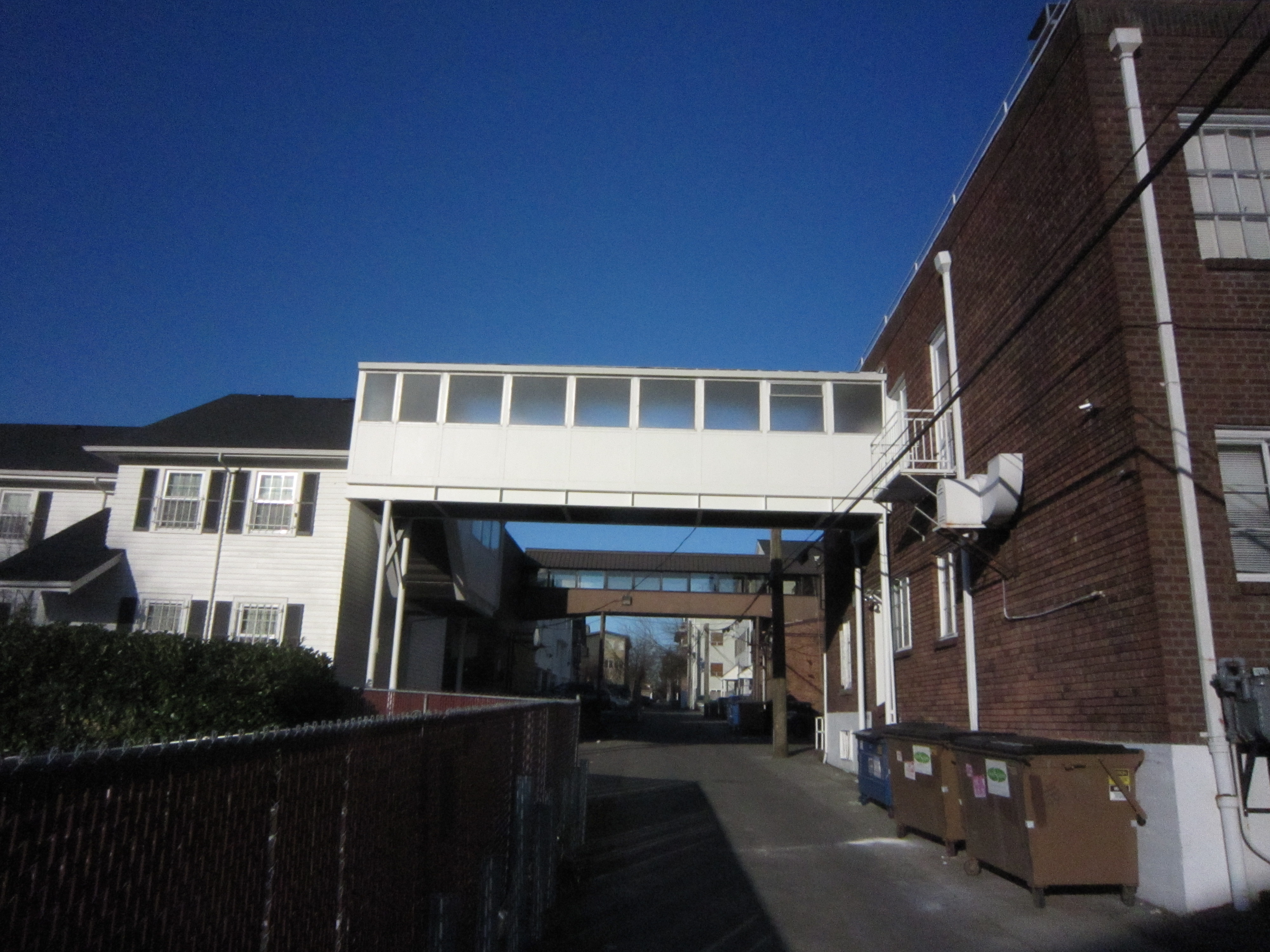
The alleyway in 2009. Skywalks have since been built.

As Hawkins had previously lost her key to the house, Dee Nichols, Hawkins's roommate, had been waiting for the familiar rattling sound of small stones hitting the window, signaling her to run downstairs to let Hawkins into the house. When Hawkins failed to return by 3:00 a.m., Nichols became concerned, and informed the housemother.

By 7:45 a.m., police were on the campus to investigate. Standard law enforcement practices typically requires a 24-hour waiting period before launching a search for a missing adult. However, in view of the string of young girls who had disappeared that year in Washington, the disappearance of Hawkins was treated very differently. Hawkins's case was also focused with intensity because she fit the physical profile of the previous girls who had mysteriously disappeared; like the other girls, Hawkins was a young Caucasian female who was considered beautiful, intelligent, and had long brown hair that was parted in the middle. An extensive and meticulous search of the 90-foot trail that Hawkins had to take recovered no traces of evidence.

The father of one of Hawkins's sorority sisters was a newsman; this garnered the story of her disappearance more prominent coverage in newspapers and television broadcasts than had been granted the cases of the previous missing girls.

Hawkins lived in room Number 8 of the Kappa Alpha Theta sorority house. A search of her room showed that all of her possessions (but the clothes on her back, her purse, and its contents) were still there. When law enforcement interviewed Hawkins's roommate she said: "Georgeann never went anyplace without leaving me the phone number where she'd be. I know she intended to come back here last night. She had one more exam and then she was going home for the summer on the thirteenth." Police did not believe that Hawkins would have left on her own account with an exam upcoming, taking only a meager amount of supplies, and without a change of clothes.

Hawkins was nearsighted, and typically wore eyeglasses or contact lenses to correct her vision, although she had neither in her possession at the time of her disappearance. (Note: Despite her visual impairment, Hawkins would still have had a relatively fair view of the environs of the brightly lit alley where she disappeared in the early morning hours, although she would have unlikely been able to see a clear outline of an individual more than ten feet beyond her without her glasses or contact lenses.) Her roommate told police that the reason why Hawkins did not have her eyeglasses or contact lenses with her that evening was because "she'd worn her contacts all day to study, and after you’ve worn contact lenses for a long time, things look blurry when you put glasses on, so she wasn't wearing them either."

Because of Hawkins's nearsightedness, Seattle Police theorized that if the perpetrator of her abduction had been surreptitiously lurking in the shadows of the alleyway and overheard Hawkins's nickname "George", he could have easily called to her using her nickname as means to lure her in his direction. This would have given her abductor the chance to overpower and silence her. However, no witnesses reported seeing or hearing any signs of a struggle at the time of her disappearance.

Police also theorized that Hawkins may have been hit over the head with a blunt object, rendered unconscious with chloroform, or possibly captured with such brute force that she could not scream out for help. Since she stood just over five feet tall, was visually impaired in the darkness of the night, and without the aid of her contacts or glasses, it would not have been that difficult for someone to overpower her in her vulnerable state.

Despite an early response, intense publicity, and an extensive search, the case quickly went cold with no leads. It was considered likely that Hawkins had met the same fate as the other five girls who were suspected of being abducted and killed by the same person, or at least the same group of people.

== Aftermath ==
=== Lake Sammamish abductions ===
On July 14, 1974, two young women disappeared approximately four hours apart from each other in broad daylight from Lake Sammamish State Park. The first was Janice Ann Ott, a married 23-year-old probation case worker at the King County Youth Service Center in Seattle. While Ott was lying on the beach, she was approached by a handsome man wearing a white shirt, tennis shorts, and tennis shoes. The man had his arm in a sling, and picnickers nearby overhead bits of their exchanges. The man asked Ott for her assistance with putting his sailboat, that was located at his parents house in Issaquah, on his car. Janice had explained that she had her bike with her, and she did not want to leave it on the beach for fear it might get lost or stolen. The man assured her that there was room for it in the trunk of his car. Ott then said to the man "O.K., I'll help you." Ott was last seen walking away with the man wearing cutoff jeans, a white shirt tied in front, and a black bikini underneath. As they walked away, one witness overheard Ott say to the man, "Hi, I'm Jan", to which he responded, "I'm Ted".

Four hours later, Denise Naslund, a 19-year-old computer programming student and office assistant, disappeared from the park. She was on the beach having a picnic, and was accompanied by her boyfriend, her dog, and another couple. Around 4:30 PM, she left the group with her dog to use the restroom and was last seen wearing cutoff shorts and a blue halter top; her sandals she left behind. Her dog later found its way back to Naslund's friends while they were searching for her. No witnesses are known to have observed Naslund conversing with or leaving Lake Sammammish in the company with a man with his arm in a sling. However, Naslund was well known for her tender-hearted nature and friendly personality, and she would have likely agreed to help any person in need (especially if he was injured or handicapped) without a second thought.

After the disappearances of Ott and Naslund, several young women, between the ages of 15–26, came forward reporting to have been approached by the man named Ted with his arm in a sling. One of the witnesses stated that she went as far as going with him to his car, reporting it to be a "metallic brown" Volkswagen Bug. She said that she ended up not going with him because there was no sailboat on his car, to which he said to her: "Oh, I forgot to tell you. It's up at my folks' house—just a jump up the hill." She told Ted that she could not go because she was waiting for her husband to arrive at the park.

=== Presumed discovery of remains ===
On September 6, 1974, two hunters stumbled across skeletal human remains near a service road in Issaquah, about 17 miles east of Seattle and two miles from Lake Sammamish. King County police sealed off the area. After a three-day search, a set of two skulls were found along with various other bones and tufts of reddish blonde and dark brown hair. The remains had fully decomposed and had been disturbed by scavenging animals. The absence of clothing and jewelry at the scene led investigators to believe that the bodies were left and discarded at the scene naked.

The skulls were later identified to be those of Janice Ott and Denise Naslund, through dental charts and samples of their hair taken from hair brushes. There was also a third set of remains discovered in the form of a femur and several vertebrae. These are believed to have been those of Hawkins, but were impossible to identify.

Six months later on March 1, 1975, forestry students from Green River Community College discovered the skull of Brenda Ball on Taylor Mountain, approximately 30 miles from the Flame Tavern where she disappeared. Two days later on March 3, Bob Keppel stumbled upon the skull of Susan Rancourt, who had vanished from Central Washington State University in Ellensburg, 87 miles away. Like Ball, Rancourt's skull had been fractured from a blunt object. Roberta Park's skull was the next to be found, 262 miles away from the campus of Oregon State University. Like the others, her skull too had signs of fractures from a blunt object. The last remains to be found on Taylor Mountain were those of Lynda Ann Healy. Unlike the other discoveries, only her jawbone was discovered and later identified through dental records. No remains of Donna Manson or Georgann Hawkins were found at the scene.

=== Bundy's 1989 confession ===
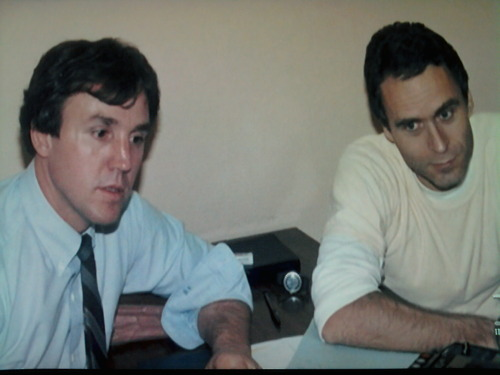
Ted Bundy (right) in January 1989, a day before his execution

In an effort to avoid the electric chair, Ted Bundy confessed the details of Hawkins' abduction and murder to detective Robert Keppel. Bundy stated that he approached Hawkins in the alley limping along on crutches and dropping his briefcase as a ruse. He asked Hawkins for assistance with carrying his briefcase to his car, which was located in a parking lot that was 160 yards north of the alley. Thinking that Bundy was really injured, Hawkins agreed to help him. As she bent over to put Bundy's briefcase into his car, he grabbed a crowbar that he had hidden beforehand, knocked Hawkins out with a single blow to the head, pushed her into his car, and sped off. Bundy claimed that while driving, Hawkins regained consciousness and started to incoherently talk about her Spanish test, believing he had taken her to tutor her for her exam. In response, he again knocked Hawkins unconscious with his crowbar.

Once at the secluded location, allegedly located near Lake Sammamish, Bundy took an unconscious Hawkins out of his car and strangled her to death with an old piece of rope. He then claims to have severed her head when returning to the site three days later and buried it in the woods on a rocky hillside nearby. It's also been alleged that Bundy said that one of her femur bones had been discovered but unidentified, one mile east of an old railroad trestle just outside of Issaquah around the same time that the remains of Janice Ott and Denise Naslund had been found. This statement has never been confirmed.

In his confession, Bundy also claimed that he ventured back to the parking lot on his bike the following afternoon, after the area around the alley had been secured off by law enforcement, in order to retrieve evidence. Bundy recovered the hooped earrings that were knocked off Hawkins's ears after he had struck her with the crowbar, as well as one of her shoes that had fallen from her foot during her abduction. Pedaling through the area, Bundy surreptitiously observed law enforcement officials a block away, and noticed that they had not yet examined the parking lot where he abducted Hawkins from.

After Bundy's confession, Keppel and a team of Washington law enforcement went to the alleged area of the crime scene 14 years later in 1989. Despite the intensive search efforts that lasted several days, no remains of Hawkins were found and she is still listed as a missing person.

=== Hawkins family ===
The Hawkins family deliberately stayed out of the limelight. Although they refused most interview requests, Hawkins mother consented to grant an exclusive interview with Green Valley News in 2014: "I was very, very angry and very bitter, and that was one of the reasons I didn't want to talk. Not only that, but angry, bitter and guilty. You think, what did I do that this [deserved to happen]... you know?"

Edie also recalled that in order to cope with Georgann's untimely death, she and her husband rarely spoke about their younger daughter over the years, stating their belief "it was easier to think of other things." They discarded most of the sympathy cards they received, and kept no shrine of their daughter. Of the notes they did find comfort in and ultimately kept, were the ones that mentioned specifically about how Hawkins had touched their lives. Her parents' one form of memorialization for their daughter was a thick scrapbook filled with pictures, school awards, and the few sympathy cards they kept.

Hawkins father, Warren B. Hawkins, died in 2003. Her sister, Patti Hawkins, later got married and had children. As of 2014, her mother, Edie Hawkins, is reported to reside in Green Valley, AZ.

== In the media ==
=== The Stranger Beside Me by Ann Rule ===
Ann Rule referenced Hawkins and her disappearance in her 1980 best selling book, The Stranger Beside Me:

"Georgann Hawkins, at eighteen, was one of those golden girls for whom luck or fate had dealt a perfect hand until that inexplicable night of June 10. Raised in the Tacoma suburb of Sumner, Washington, she'd been a Daffodil Princess and a cheerleader... Vivacious and glowing with good health, Georgann had a pixie-like quality to her loveliness. Her long brown hair was glossy and her brown eyes lively. Petite at five feet two inches tall and 115 pounds, she was the youngest of the two daughters of the Warren B. Hawkins family."

=== The Deliberate Stranger (1986 TV film) ===
In 1986, the best-selling book by Richard W. Larsen was adapted into a two part television film with Mark Harmon as Ted Bundy. In the film, Hawkins's name was changed to Anne Pitney and she was portrayed by an uncredited actress. The film's opening sequence consists of a re-enactment of Hawkins abduction in a dark alley.

=== Murder Made Me Famous (TV series 2015– ) ===
In the first season of the TV series 'Murder Made Me Famous', episode five focused on Ted Bundy's crimes. The show features a re-enactment of Bundy abducting Hawkins, with George Quartz as Bundy and Alisha Revel as Hawkins. The depiction is based on Ted Bundy's 1989 confession and retains a faithful adaptation to his words. The clothes that Revel wears as Hawkins, are much more consistent with what Hawkins was last reported to be wearing. Although there is no re-enactment of the murder itself, there is a close up shot of a dead person's bare foot laying on the grounds of a dark woods, with a narrative stating that Hawkins's body has never been found.

=== Ted Bundy: Falling for a Killer (TV miniseries 2020) ===
Hawkins is mentioned in great detail of this series. It also features previously unseen color photos of Hawkins in her lifetime. Phyllis Armstrong, a friend to Hawkins, was interviewed for this series and she shares her story of meeting Hawkins when they were Daffodil Princesses at the Washington Daffodil Festival in 1973, and their experiences together as peers at the University of Washington. Furthermore, Armstrong also revealed that Bundy had approached her asking for help with his car a few days before Hawkins went missing.

== See also ==
- Crime in Washington (state)
- List of people who disappeared mysteriously (1970s)

== Cited works and further reading ==
- Keppel, Robert D.; Birnes, William J. (1995). The Riverman. London: Arrow Books Limited. ISBN 978-0-099-23311-4.
- Michaud, Stephen G.; Aynesworth, Hugh (1999). Ted Bundy: Conversations with a Killer. Texas: author-link. ISBN 978-1-928-70417-1.
- Michaud, Stephen G.; Aynesworth, Hugh (2012). The Only Living Witness: The True Story of Serial Sex Killer Ted Bundy. Texas: author-link. ISBN 978-1928704119.
- Rule, Ann (1980). The Stranger Beside Me. New York: W.W. Norton and Company Inc. ISBN 978-1-938402-78-4.
- Sullivan, Kevin (2009). The Bundy Murders: A Comprehensive History. Jefferson, NC: MacFarland. ISBN 978-0786444267.
