= Julian Gilbert Leach =

American plant pathologist (1894-1972)

Julian Gilbert Leach (November 16, 1894 – May 4, 1972) was an American plant pathologist and a professor of plant pathology at the University of Minnesota (1937-38) and at the West Virginia University (1938-1960). He published a landmark text Insect Transmission of Plant Diseases first published in 1940 which helped develop the field of vector biology in agriculture.

Leach was born in Somerville, Tennessee, to William Harvey and Julia Ann (Covington) Leach. He was educated at the University of Tennessee in 1917 where he received a Bachelor of Scientific Agriculture. He then studied at the University of Minnesota, receiving a master's degree in 1918 and a doctorate in 1922. He studied under Elvin Stakman. He then spent some time at the Imperial College in London and returned to work at the University of Minnesota. He worked at Colorado (1919-20) and then became a professor of plant pathology in 1920 at the University of Minnesota. He was influenced by Royal Norton Chapman to work on a book on insects and their role in plant disease. In 1938 he moved to West Virginia University and headed the department of plant pathology. After his retirement he was made professor emeritus in 1965.

Leach developed four rules in his 1940 textbook, sometimes termed as Leach's Rules, similar to those of Koch to help establish if an insect was involved in the transmission of a plant disease:

- a close association between the insect and a diseased plant
- insect regularly visiting healthy plants under suitable conditions for disease transmission
- the natural presence of the pathogen on the insect following visitation to a diseased plant
- the development of the disease produced experimentally after insect visitation under controlled conditions
