= David Leach =

David Leach may refer to:

- David Leach (potter) (1911–2005), English studio potter
- David Leach (admiral) (1928–2020), Royal Australian Navy officer
- David Leach (activist) (born 1945), Des Moines anti-abortion activist
