= Daffodil Festival =

Coordinates: 47°10′49″N 122°17′30″W

The Daffodil Festival
- Genre: Community Festival, Royalty Program
- Dates: 1926-present (except 1943–1945, 2020)
- Location: Pierce County, Washington
- Years active: 91
- Website: The Daffodil Festival instagram.com/daffodilfestival/

The Daffodil Festival is a regional festival and "Royal Court" contest program. The Grand Floral Parade is held in Pierce County, Washington, every April. It consists of a flower parade and a year-long royalty program to select a festival queen from one of the 24 area high schools. Each year, the Royal Court spend thousands of hours promoting education, community pride and volunteerism in the county. In 2012, the Royal Court was named the "Official Ambassadors of Pierce County" by the County Executive and the Pierce County Council.

== History ==
The Daffodil Festival came into existence because of the bulb industry between 1922 and 1925. It followed a severe infestation of ‘hop lice’ that destroyed the area's hop crops and Prohibition. The US Department of Agriculture recommended bulb planting to Valley growers because of the mildness of the climate and ideal soil conditions. The climate conditions of the Puyallup River Valley produce blooms about 2–3 weeks earlier than other areas, in plenty of time for the mid winter markets. The area quickly became the nations ‘bulb basket’ producing 50% of the nations daffodil bulbs, over 50% of its bulb iris and 80% of the nations tulips. About 300 of the 12,000 varieties of daffodils were grown in the Valley. The most popular and most locally grown is the King Alfred.

Mr. and Mrs. Charles W. Orton hosted civic leaders from 15 towns in western Washington in 1926. In 1927 the Sumner Chamber of Commerce sponsored the first Bulb Banquet. Free daffodils were given away to visitors. Between 1928 and 1933 a Bulb Sunday and bulb banquet were held. The roads became increasingly congested each year as people drove out to see the colorful fields. Reaching a peak of 30,000 vehicles. A local photographer Lee Merrill suggested a parade be held to "take the daffodils to the people". He organized the first event in 1934, this was the first festival as it is known today. Lee decided every festival needs a queen so as he was driving through Puyallup he saw a pretty girl and stopped and asked her if she would be the queen. Her reply was "I'll have to ask my husband". Thusly, Elizabeth Lee Wotten became the first Daffodil Queen at the age of 28. She had only four days to find a proper gown. She stood on a reviewing platform with her "flower girl" and "princess" to watch the parade in downtown Tacoma. Supporters of the festival included the Chambers of Commerce of Tacoma, Puyallup, Sumner. In 1937 the Daffodil Festival was made into a non-profit corporation. Funding came from donations and the sale of memberships.

An annual event, the festival encompasses the whole of Pierce County. Originally five participating cities included Tacoma, Puyallup, Sumner, Orting and Fife joined in 1959. The Daffodil Festival grew to become the third largest floral festival in the United States by the 1960s. With the exception of 1943–1945 (due to the Second World War) and 2020 (due to the COVID-19 pandemic), the Daffodil Parade has been held each year since 1934.

The first daffodils and narcissus in the area were planted in 1910 by George Lawler at Gardenville, now the location of the Poodle Dog Restaurant in Fife. Many of the earliest bulbs were imported from England and the Continent, sometimes at a cost of $75 a bulb. In 1911, Lawler purchased 9000 bulbs of all varieties and kinds and hand planted them Dutch style. These plantings grew to 15 acres in North Puyallup, and finally to about 100 acres on the banks of the Nisqually River near Roy. Other early growers were Charles and Ed Orton, Frank Chernenko, H.F. Groningen and L.M.Hatch. The largest growers were Harold Knutson in Sumner, Van Lierop in Puyallup, and Wally Staazt at Orting. The best viewing times are from March 15- April 1.

== Parade ==
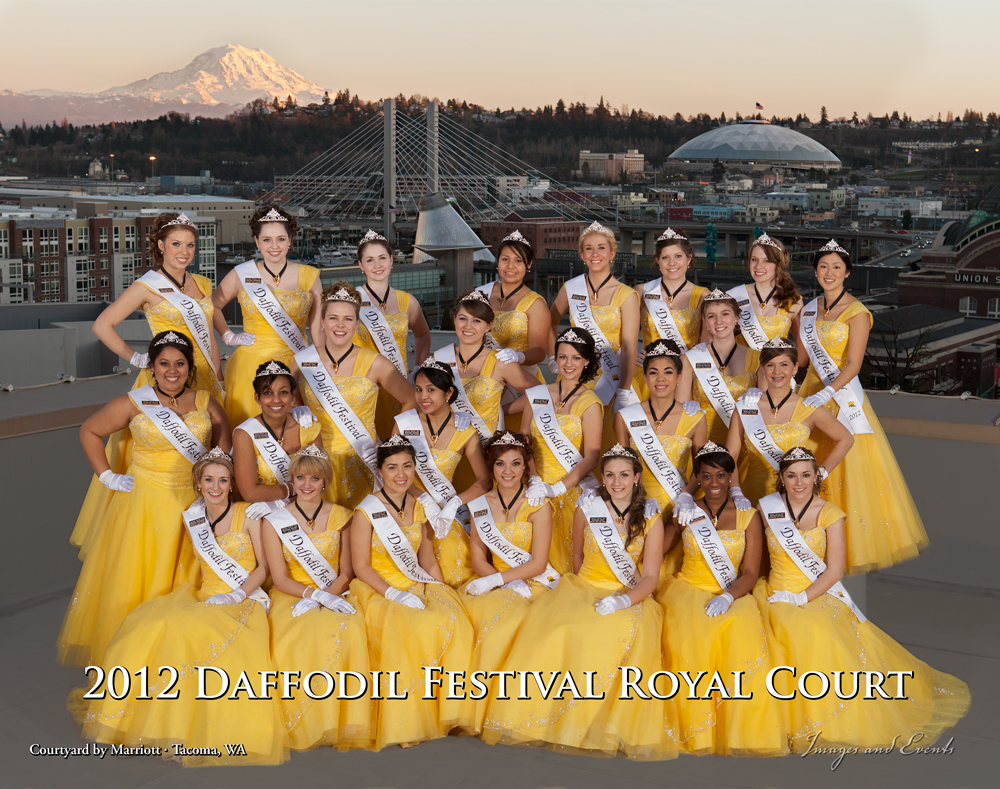
2012 Daffodil Festival Royal Court

The Grand Floral Parade travels through Pierce County, Washington, with four routes in Tacoma, Puyallup, Sumner and Orting in one day.
