= Super Prep =

- Publisher: Allen Wallace
- Founder: Allen Wallace
- Founded: 1985
- Country: United States
- Based in: Laguna Beach, California, U.S.

Super Prep is a former sports magazine that was based in Laguna Beach, California. It was published in 1985 by Allen Wallace, a lawyer. Its main focus is to provide recruiting information on high school football players.

In 1987, The Boston Globe wrote: "In three short years, Super Prep has become an essential tool for recruiting coordinators nationwide." The San Diego Union-Tribune called it "one of the more respected services," and the Los Angeles Times called it "usually a reliable source".

SuperPrep was folded into TheInsiders.com, another recruiting site, in 2003. The final SuperPrep print magazine was published in 2012.
