= Cecil Leach =

English cricketer

Personal information
- Full name: Cecil Leach
- Born: 29 November 1894; Littleborough, Lancashire, England
- Died: 4 January 1973 (aged 78); Nailsea, Somerset, England
- Role: Batsman

Domestic team information
- Years: Team
- 1923–1924: Lancashire
- 1924–1928: Somerset
- FC debut: 30 June 1923 Lancashire v Middlesex
- Last FC: 15 June 1928 Somerset v Glamorgan

Career statistics
Competition	First-class
Matches	20
Runs scored	250
Batting average	8.92
100s/50s	0/1
Top score	79
Balls bowled	120
Wickets	1
Bowling average	87.00
5 wickets in innings	0
10 wickets in match	0
Best bowling	1/62
Catches/stumpings	5/–
- Source: CricketArchive, 29 November 2010

Cecil Leach (29 November 1894 – 4 January 1973) played first-class cricket for Lancashire and Somerset between 1923 and 1928. He was born at Littleborough, Lancashire and died at Nailsea, Somerset. Leach's true identity was discovered in the research for a 2017 book; previously this cricketer had been equated with a different person, Edward Leach Cecil Leach, born 28 November 1896 at Featherstall, Oldham, and as of January 2018 cricket websites retain this conflation.

Leach was a professional middle-order or opening batsman and an occasional bowler. It is not known whether he was right- or left-handed. He played regularly for Lancashire's second eleven in the Minor Counties from 1921, enjoying little success until a match against Northumberland in June 1923, when he made 65 and an unbeaten 40, both innings being higher than any he had achieved in more than a dozen matches before. These innings put him into the Lancashire first team and in his first first-class match, against Middlesex at Old Trafford, he made 79 and was the top-scorer in a Lancashire first innings of 385 which effectively won the match. Leach retained his place in the Lancashire team for much of the rest of the 1923 summer, but enjoyed no further success: in 12 other innings, he made only 66 runs in all.

In 1924, Leach played only once for Lancashire in mid-season, again without success, and he moved to Somerset as a professional with Long Ashton Cricket Club, which explains why he then unusually appeared for Somerset in an end-of-season match against the South Africans, in which he made 13 and 0. Not qualified for Somerset to play County Championship matches, he played only once in each of the 1925 and 1926 seasons, and not at all in 1927, when he had broken his arm in a fall at his employer, the Ashton Gate Brewery. But in 1928, he was finally qualified to play and he was picked in five early-season matches; but he was not a success and his highest score was just 27, made in the match against Nottinghamshire. Finally dropped mid-season, he did not appear again in first-class cricket, though he remained in Somerset and continued to play club cricket for Long Ashton.
