= Castleton Cricket Club Ground =

Cricket ground in Lancashire, England

Ground information
- Location: Castleton, Rochdale, Lancashire
- Coordinates: 53.6107°N 2.1696°W
- Establishment: 1872 (first recorded match)

Team information
Lancashire	(1876)
- As of 5 September 2010; Source: profile

Castleton Cricket Club Ground was a cricket ground in Rochdale, Lancashire, England. The first recorded match on the ground was in 1872, when Castleton played a team called An Eleven.

In 1876, the ground held its only first-class match when Lancashire played Kent.

The final recorded match on the ground came in 1891 when Castleton played Burnley. The ground was later required for building and built over. The ground was located to the south Sparth Bottoms Road, an area which is today covered by industrial units following the closure of the ground in 1965.
