= Ethel Leach =

British politician

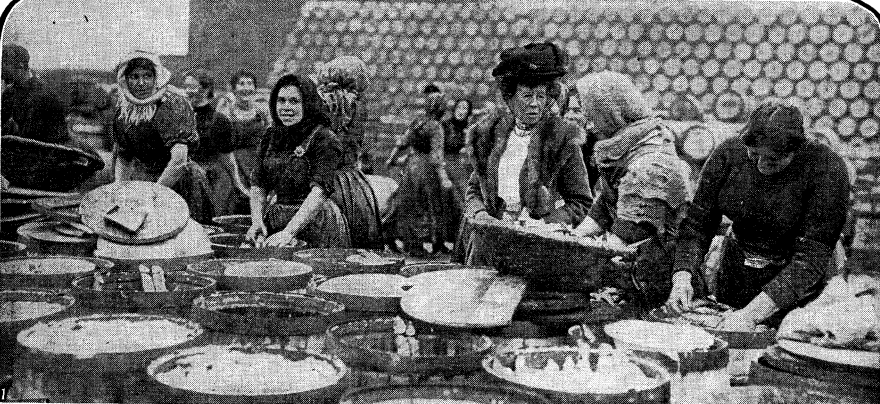
Ethel Leach (centre) canvassing bloater-packers in the Gorleston ward of Great Yarmouth, in the run-up to the municipal election of 1908.

Mary Ethel Leach (1850 or 1851 – April 1936) was a British politician.

== Life ==
Leach grew up in Great Yarmouth and married an ironmonger, the couple sharing a commitment to radical politics. In 1881, she was elected to the Great Yarmouth School Board as an independent. School provision in the area was then poor, and she championed kindergarten methods of teaching younger children. Within six months, she persuaded the rest of the board to adopt this measure.

Leach discovered that a pupil at the local industrial school had been hit with a trowel and organised a public enquiry into the matter. The enquiry found no evidence of similar incidents, so decided to take no action. Leach arranged to be appointed as the school's matron, reducing the use of corporal punishment. However, eighteen months later, the school board believed that the school regime was too soft, and replaced her with a male superintendent.

With more free time, Leach began teaching cookery in schools. She also campaigned against after-hours teaching, which she believed put unnecessary pressure on pupils. Concerned by malnourishment among pupils, she introduced 1d dinners, later complementing these with 1d lunches. She long tried to persuade the board to remit the fees of poor pupils, and finally succeeded in 1886. In 1889, Leach convinced the board to set up a pupil teacher training scheme to improve the quality of teaching in schools, and the following year, she got the school leaving age raised.

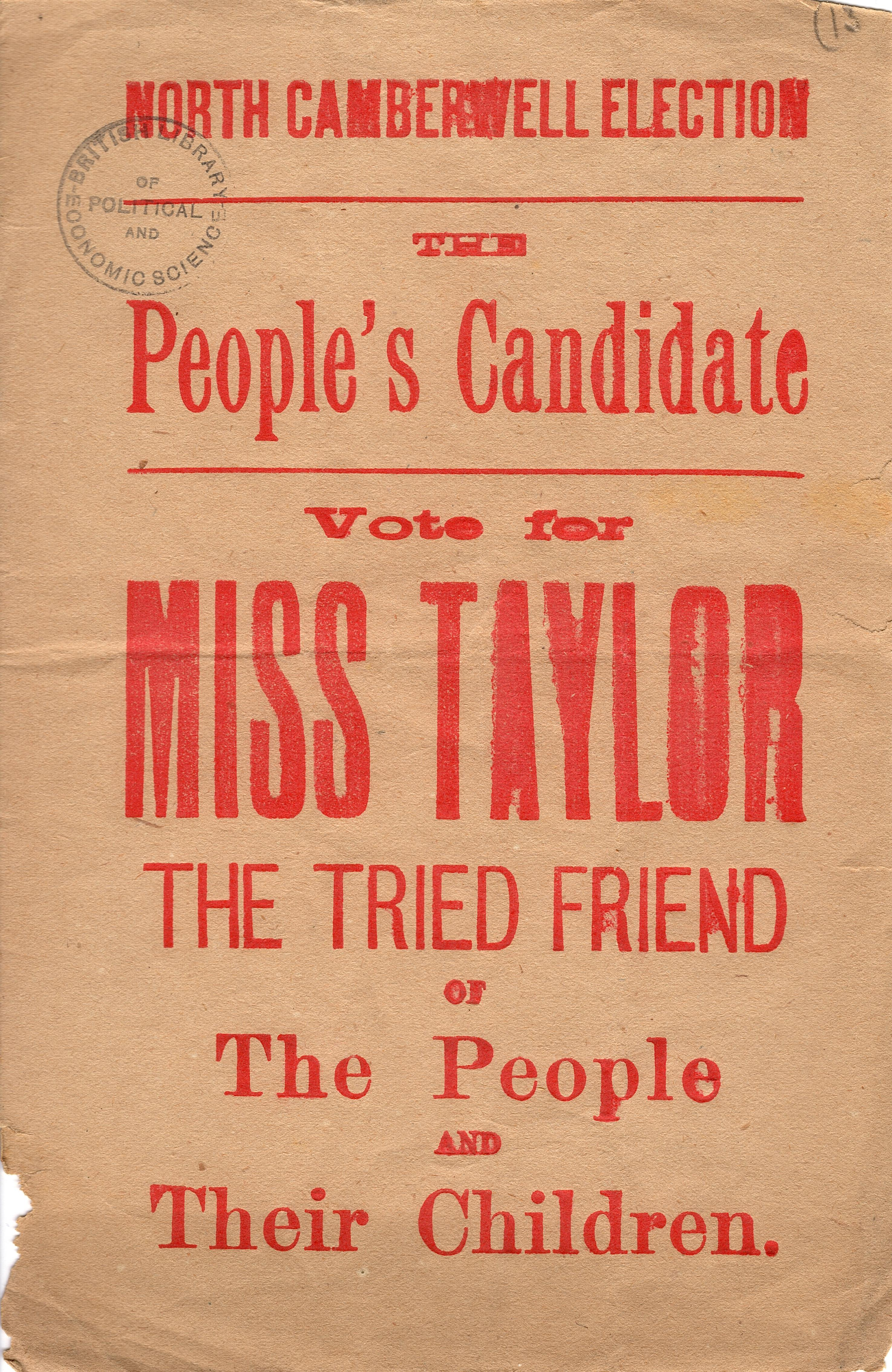
Leach was Helen Taylor's agent

Leach's many achievements attracted widespread attention; she was elected to the committee of the National Educational Association, and lectured for the Land and Labour League. She was active in the women's suffrage movement from the early 1880s. In 1885, she was election agent to Helen Taylor's campaign in Camberwell North at the 1885 general election, although the returning officer refused to accept Taylor's papers, as women were not permitted to stand.

Leach gradually increased her vote in school board elections, and by 1890 was able to take second place. By this time, she stood as a Liberal Party representative, but this had little impact on her activity, and she refused to campaign jointly with other Liberal candidates in the elections. In 1895, she was elected as vice-chair of the school board, and by this time she was also able to win election to the Board of Guardians. There, she campaigned for reforms to nursing and childcare in the town. However, the clerk of the board, a Mr Palmer, opposed her activities, refusing her access to his office to view minutes of meetings. When he requested a £30 pay rise, she argued that a £3 raise should suffice. Around this time, Palmer circulated a cartoon at a meeting which implied an affair between a medical officer and a nurse. Leach took the opportunity to call a public enquiry into his conduct; Palmer was only reprimanded, but his mental health suffered and he was remanded to an asylum. He was dismissed, and Leach was thereafter able to participate fully as a member of the board.

In 1908, Leach stood for the Gorleston ward on Yarmouth Town Council. Her campaign attracted national interest, and she appeared on the front page of the Daily Mirror, but she was not elected. She did become a councillor after World War I, later serving as an alderman and the first woman mayor of the town. She was also first woman to become a magistrate in the town.

Leach was still serving on the council in 1932, when she opened Alderman Leach Secondary Modern School. This later became East Norfolk Sixth Form College, which houses a picture of Leach.
