= Robert Leach (cricketer) =

English cricketer

Robert Leach (18 December 1849 – 10 September 1939) was an English cricketer active from 1868 to 1876 who played for Lancashire. He was born in Rochdale and died in Newport Pagnell. He appeared in three first-class matches as a righthanded batsman, scoring 35 runs with a highest score of 14.
