= William Leach (cricketer, born 1851) =

English cricketer

William Edmund Leach (7 November 1851 – 30 November 1932) was an English cricketer who played in New Zealand for Canterbury and in England for Lancashire County Cricket Club. He was born at Rochdale in 1851 and died in Buckinghamshire in 1932. He appeared in six first-class matches as a righthanded batsman, scoring 235 runs with a highest score of 56 and held one catch.

After his cricket career, Leach owned a sugar plantation in Argentina.
