= Roger Leach (cricketer) =

English cricketer

Roger Chadwick Leach (21 September 1853 – 21 April 1889) was an English cricketer active in 1885 who played for Lancashire. He was born in Rochdale and died in Salta, Argentina. He appeared in one first-class match as a righthanded batsman, scoring 49 runs with a highest score of 39.
