= Potter (name) =

Potter is an English surname that originally referred to someone who made pottery. It is occasionally used as a given name. People with the name include:

== Surname ==
- Albert Potter (1897–1942), English footballer
- Alexandra Potter (born 1970), British author
- Alfie Potter (born 1989), English football player
- Alfred Potter (1827–1878), English clergyman and cricketer
- Allen Potter (1818–1885), American politician
- Alonzo Potter (1800–1865), Bishop of Pennsylvania
- A. J. Potter "Archie" (1918–1980), Irish composer
- Arnold Potter (1804–1872), American self-declared Messiah
- Art Potter (1909–1998), Canadian ice hockey administrator
- Barbara Potter (born 1961), American tennis player
- Barnaby Potter (1577–1642), Bishop of Carlisle
- Barrett Potter (1776–1865), American lawyer and judge
- Beatrix Potter (1866–1943), British children's writer
- Bert Potter (disambiguation), several people including:
  - Bert Potter (composer) (1874–1930), American composer
- Beryl H. Potter (1900–1985), American astronomer
- Beryl Potter (d. 1998), Canadian disability rights activist
- Bill Potter (1872–1970), Australian footballer for Fitzroy
- Bill Potter (musician), country singer and television personality
- Brandon Potter (born 1982), American voice actor
- B. T. Potter (born 2000), American football player
- Carol Potter (poet), American poet
- Carol Potter (actress) (born 1948), American actress
- Cassandra Potter (born 1981), American curler
- Charles E. Potter (1916–1979), American politician
- Cherry Potter, British journalist
- Christopher Potter (disambiguation), several people, including:
  - Christopher Potter (provost) (1591–1646), English academic and clergyman
  - Christopher Potter (died 1817), MP for Colchester 1781–2 and 1784
  - Chris Potter (priest) (born 1949), Dean and Archdeacon of St Asaph
  - Christopher Potter (author) (born 1959), English author and publisher
  - Chris Potter (actor) (born 1960), Canadian actor, musician and pitchman
  - Chris Potter (jazz saxophonist) (born 1971), American jazz saxophonist and composer
  - Chris Potter (record producer), British record producer and mixer
- Cipriani Potter (1792–1871) British composer, pianist and educator
- Clare Potter (1903–1999), American fashion designer
- Clarkson Nott Potter (1825–1882), American civil engineer, lawyer and politician
- Clayton D. Potter (1880–1924), Justice of the Supreme Court of Mississippi
- Craig Potter (born 1984), Scottish football player
- Cullen Potter (born 2007), American ice hockey player
- Cynthia Potter (born 1950), American diver
- Dale Potter (born 1949), Canadian football player
- Danny Potter (born 1979), English football player
- Darren Potter (born 1984), Irish football player
- David M. Potter (1910–1971), American historian
- Dennis Potter (1935–1994), British playwright
- Don Potter (1902–2004), British sculptor and potter
- Don Potter (musician), American musician
- Dora Joan Potter (1915–1987), Australian children's author
- Edmund Potter (1802–1883), British industrialist, MP for Carlisle, Beatrix Potter's grandfather
- Edward Clark Potter (1857–1923), American sculptor
- Edward Tuckerman Potter (1831–1904), American architect
- Elderkin Potter (1782–1845), American politician and lawyer from Ohio
- Elisha Reynolds Potter (1764–1835), American congressman from Rhode Island
- Elisha R. Potter (1811–1882), American congressman from Rhode Island, son of Elisha Reynolds Potter
- Emery D. Potter (1804–1896), American politician
- Frank Potter (aviator) (1891–1917), British flying ace
- Frank Potter (politician) (1919–1978), Australian politician
- Frank J. Potter (1871–1948), British architect
- Frederick Potter (1857–1941), New Zealand businessman
- Fuller Potter (1910–1990), American abstract expressionist artist
- George Potter (disambiguation), several people, including:
  - George Potter (politician) (1883–1945), Australian politician
  - George Richard Potter (1900–1982), British historian
- Gilbert Potter (1878–1921), Irish police officer
- Glenn Potter (born c. 1938), American basketball coach
- Graham Potter (born 1975), English footballer and manager
- Greg Potter, American comic book writer
- Harrison Potter (1891–1984), American pianist
- Henry Codman Potter (1835–1908), American clergyman
- Horatio Potter (1802–1887), American bishop
- Ian Potter (born 1968), British writer
- Jack Potter (born 1938), Australian cricketer
- James Potter (disambiguation), several people
- Jeff Potter (1941–2025), Australian rules footballer
- Jennie O'Neill Potter (1867–1900), American actor and dramatic reader
- Jenny Potter (born 1979), American ice hockey player
- John Potter (disambiguation), several people, including:
  - John Potter (bishop) (c. 1674–1747), Archbishop of Canterbury
  - John Potter (Maine lawyer) (1787–1865), American politician
  - John Potter (Liberal politician) (1815–1858), British Liberal politician
  - John Potter (Conservative politician) (1873–1940), British Conservative politician
  - John Potter (footballer) (born 1979), Scottish football player
  - John E. Potter, American Postmaster General
  - John F. Potter (1817–1899), American politician
  - Jon Potter (born 1963), British field hockey player
  - Jonathan Potter (born 1956), British professor and originator of discursive psychology
  - Jonathan Potter (cricketer) (born 1971), English cricketer
  - Jonathan Potter (computer programmer), Australian programmer
- Judith Potter (born 1942), New Zealand judge
- K.C. Potter (born 1939), American academic administrator and LGBT rights activist
- Kimberly Potter (born 1972), American police officer convicted of killing Daunte Wright
- Lauren Potter (born 1990), American actress
- Lela Brooks Potter (1908–1990), Canadian speed skater
- Luke Potter (born 1989), English football player
- Madeleine Potter (born 1958), American actress
- Maisie Potter (born 1997), Welsh snowboarder
- Mark Potter (sportscaster) (born 1960), Canadian sports broadcaster
- Mark Potter (judge) (born 1937), British judge
- Mark Potter (musician), British musician from the band Elbow
- Martin Potter (actor) (born 1944), British actor
- Martin Potter (surfer) (born 1965), British surfer
- Matthew Potter, Irish academic
- Maureen Potter (1925–2004), Irish actress
- Micah Potter (born 1998), American professional basketball player
- Michael Potter (disambiguation), several people, including:
  - Michael Potter (immunologist) (1924–2013), American physician and immunologist
  - Michael Potter (born 1963), Australian rugby league footballer and coach
  - Mike Potter (racing driver) (1949–2022), American racecar driver
  - Mike Potter (baseball) (born 1951), American baseball outfielder
  - Michael Cressé Potter (1858–1948), English botanist, herbarium curator, and Anglican priest
- Mitch Potter (born 1980), American track and field athlete
- Monica Potter (born 1971), American actress
- Mary Potter (disambiguation), several people
- Nels Potter (1911–1999), American baseball player
- Nelson Thomas Potter Jr. (1939–2013), American philosopher
- Norm Potter (18??–1951), Australian rugby league footballer
- Orlando B. Potter (1823–1894), American politician
- Patricia Potter (born 1975), British actress
- Paulus Potter (1625–1654), Dutch painter
- Peter Potter (1904 or 1905 - 1983), American disc jockey
- Philip Potter (church leader) (1921–2015), Methodist minister
- Philip Potter (1936–2016), British opera singer
- Robert Brown Potter (1829–1887), American Civil War General
- Robert Potter (1909–2010), British architect
- Roger Potter (1907–1982), American basketball coach
- Ron Potter, Australian rugby league footballer
- Russell Potter (born 1960), American writer
- Ryan Potter (born 1995), American actor
- Sally Potter (born 1949), British film director and screenwriter
- Samuel J. Potter (1753–1804), American Senator
- Sarah Potter (born 1961), English cricketer
- Stephen Potter (disambiguation), several people, including:
  - Stephen Potter (1900–1969), British author of self-help books
- Ted Potter (born 1944), Australian rules footballer
- Ted Potter Jr. (born 1983), American PGA Tour golfer
- Thomas Potter (disambiguation), several people, including:
  - Thomas Potter (Universalist) (1689–1777), American Universalist
  - Thomas Potter (industrialist) (1745–1811), Scottish-born Danish industrialist and merchant
  - Thomas Potter (mayor) (1774–1845), mayor of Manchester, England, father of Thomas Bayley Potter
  - Thomas Bayley Potter (1817–1898), British politician
  - Thomas J. Potter (1840–1888), vice-president and general manager of the Union Pacific Railroad
  - Thomas Rossell Potter (1799–1873), British naturalist
  - Tom Potter (born 1940), Mayor of Portland, Oregon
  - Tommy Potter (1918–1988), American jazz double bass player
- Van Rensselaer Potter (1911–2001), American biochemist
- Vincent Potter (c. 1614–1661), army officer, Regicide of King Charles I
- William Potter (disambiguation), several people, including:
  - William Appleton Potter (1842–1909), American architect
  - William C. Potter, American scientist and professor
  - William Everett Potter (1905–1988), Governor of Panama Canal Zone
  - William Knight Potter (1844–1914), businessman and mayor of Providence, Rhode Island
  - William P. Potter, American naval commander
  - William Simpson Potter (1805–1879), British author
  - William W. Potter (Michigan politician) (1869–1940), American politician
  - William Wilson Potter (1792–1839), American politician

== Given name ==
- Potter P. Howard (fl. 1947–1951), mayor of Boise, Idaho
- Potter Palmer (1826–1902), American businessman and Chicago-area developer
- Potter Stewart (1915–1985), Associate Justice of the United States Supreme Court. His opinion in the Jacobellis v. Ohio obscenity trial popularized the phrase "I know it when I see it."

== Fictional characters ==
- The Potter family, principal characters in A.S. Byatt's "Frederica Quartet" novels: The Virgin in the Garden (1978), Still Life (1985), Babel Tower (1996), and A Whistling Woman (2002)
- Bonifacio "Potter", from the Peruvian TV series Al Fondo Hay Sitio
- Brian Potter, from the British sitcom Phoenix Nights
- Cedric Potter, from Under Capricorn
- Clarence Potter, from Harry Turtledove's Southern Victory alternate history novel series
- Gail Potter, from the British soap opera Coronation Street
- From the Harry Potter series:
  - Albus Severus Potter, Harry Potter and Ginny Potter (née Weasley)'s son
  - Ginny Potter (née Weasley), Harry Potter's wife
  - Harry Potter, title character
  - James Potter, Lily Potter (née Evans)'s husband and Harry Potter's father
  - James Sirius Potter, Harry Potter and Ginny Potter (née Weasley)'s son
  - Lily Luna Potter, Harry Potter and Ginny Potter (née Weasley)'s daughter
  - Lily Potter (née Evans), James Potter's wife and Harry Potter's mother
  - Fleamont Potter, James Potter's father and Harry Potter's paternal grandfather
  - Euphemia Potter, James Potter's mother and Harry Potter's paternal grandmother
- Harry Potter Jr., from the film Troll
- Mr. Potter, from the film It's A Wonderful Life
- Joey Potter, from the TV series Dawson's Creek
- Marygay Potter, from Joe Haldeman's science fiction novel The Forever War
- Melvin Potter, a Marvel Comics character, formerly the villain Gladiator
- Mr. Potter, from the film The Stranger
- Norman Potter, the school caretaker from the British sitcom Please Sir!
- Pansy Potter, from The Beano
- Peter Potter "Painless", from The Paleface
- Peter Potter Jr. "Junior", from Son of Paleface
- Professor Potter, a DC Comics character
- Sherman T. Potter, from the TV series M*A*S*H and AfterMASH
- Tycho Potter, from Margaret Mahy's novel The Catalogue of the Universe

== See also ==
- Justice Potter (disambiguation)
