= William Potter =

William, Will, or Bill Potter may refer to:

== People ==
- Bill Potter (1872–1970), Australian footballer for Fitzroy
- Bill Potter (musician) (1923–1975), American singer, actor, and television personality
- Will Potter, American journalist
- William Potter (cricketer, born 1799) (1799–1853), English cricketer in the 1820s
- William Potter (cricketer, born 1847) (1847–1920), English cricketer
- William Appleton Potter (1842–1909), American architect
- William C. Potter, professor at the Middlebury Institute of International Studies at Monterey
- William Everett Potter (1905–1988), Governor of the Panama Canal Zone, 1956–1960
- William Knight Potter (1844–1914), businessman and mayor of Providence, Rhode Island
- William Norwood Potter (1840–1895), English chess player and writer
- William P. Potter, (1850–1917), United States Navy officer
- William Simpson Potter (1805–1876), English author
- William W. Potter (Michigan politician) (1869–1940), Michigan politician
- William Wilson Potter (1792–1839), U.S. Representative from Pennsylvania

== Fictional characters ==
- William Potter, a character from the 1962 movie Lawrence of Arabia, played by Harry Fowler

== See also ==
- Potter (surname)
