= Michael Potter (disambiguation) =

Michael Potter (born 1963) is an Australian rugby league coach and former player.

Michael or Mike Potter may also refer to:

- Michael Potter (entrepreneur), entrepreneur, documentary filmmaker and author
- Michael Potter (cyclist) (born 1997), Australian cyclist
- Michael Potter (immunologist) (1924–2013), American physician and immunologist
- Michael Potter (minister), covenanter
- Mike Potter (racing driver) (1949–2022), American racecar driver
- Mike Potter (baseball) (born 1951), American baseball outfielder
- Michael Cressé Potter (1858–1948), English botanist, herbarium curator, and Anglican priest
