= Thomas Potter =

Thomas Potter may refer to:

- Thomas Potter (Universalist) (1689–1777), one founder of the Universalist Church in America
- Thomas Bayley Potter (1817–1898), British MP for Rochdale
- Thomas Rossell Potter (1799–1873), geologist and writer about Leicestershire
- Thomas Potter (died 1759) (1718–1759), British MP for Aylesbury, Okehampton and St Germans
- Thomas Potter (1740–1801), British MP for Lostwithiel
- Thomas Potter (mayor) (1774–1845), mayor of Manchester, England, father of Thomas Bayley Potter
- Tom Potter (born 1940), mayor of Portland, Oregon, United States
- Tommy Potter (1918–1988), jazz double bass player
- Thomas Joseph Potter (1828–1873), English Catholic convert, educator and hymn writer
- Thomas J. Potter (1840–1888), vice-president and general manager of the Union Pacific Railroad
- Tom Potter (brewer), co-founder of Brooklyn Brewery
- Thomas Potter (cricketer) (1844–1909), English cricketer
- Thomas Potter (industrialist) (1745–1811), Scottish-born Danish industrialist and merchant
