= William Bagwell =

William Bagwell may refer to:

- William Bagwell (politician) (1776–1826), Irish politician
- William Bagwell (writer) (fl. 1655), merchant and writer on astronomy
- Bill Bagwell (1895–1976), American baseball player
