= James Martin Center for Nonproliferation Studies =

NGO seeking nonproliferation of WMDs

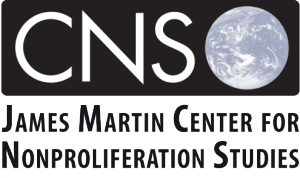
- Founder: William C. Potter
- Established: 1989
- Mission: Education and training in the global nonproliferation of weapons of mass destruction.
- Key people: Jeffrey Lewis, Avner Cohen
- Endowment: Gifted in 2007 by James Martin
- Subsidiaries: VCDNP; CNS DC; CNS Middlebury; Defunct: CNS NISRO
- Owner: Middlebury Institute of International Studies at Monterey
- Address: 499 Van Buren Street
- Location: Monterey, California, United States
- Website: www.nonproliferation.org

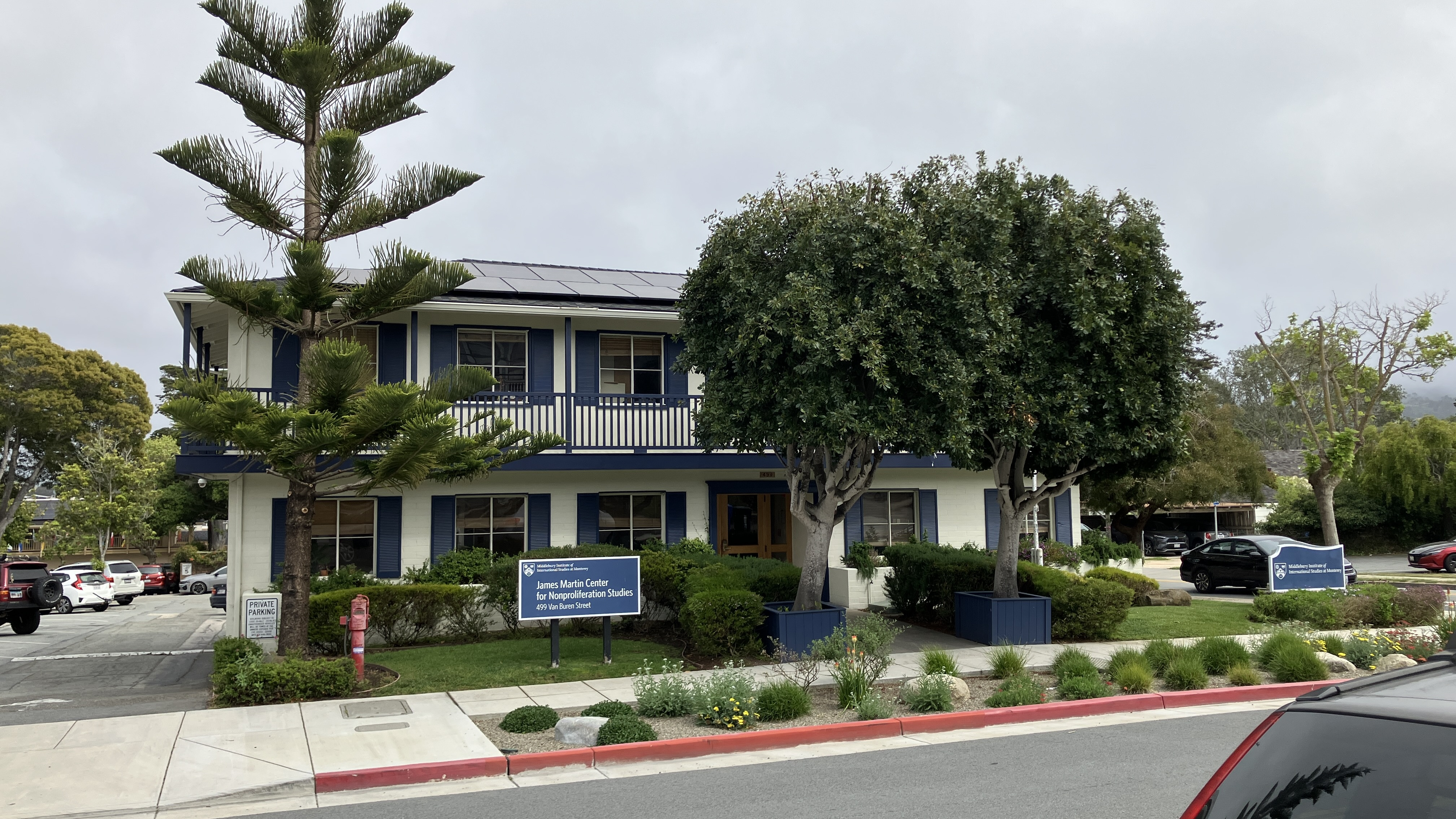
Front view of the CNS building in Monterey

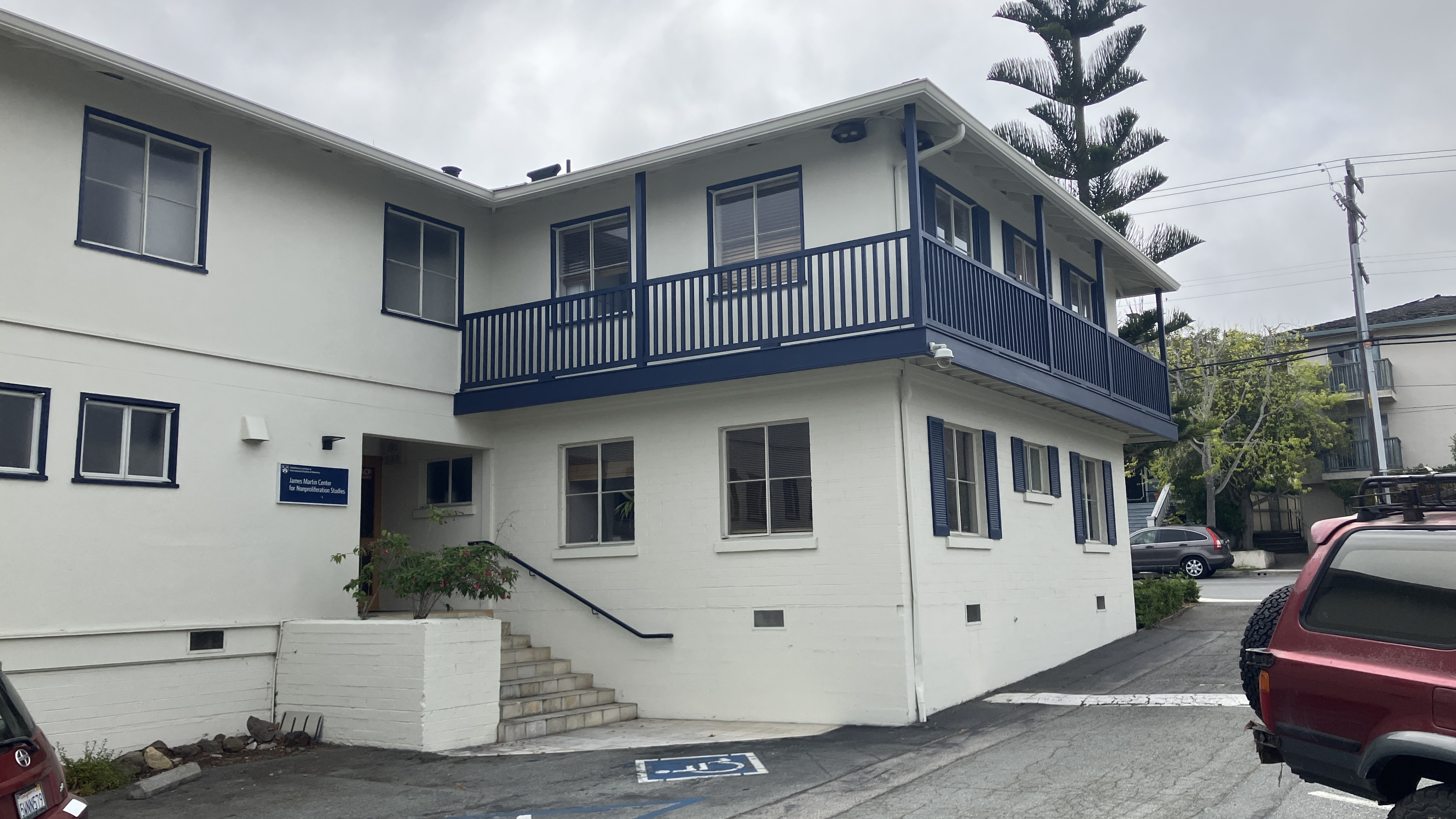
Side view of the CNS building in Monterey

The James Martin Center for Nonproliferation Studies (CNS), established in 1989, also known as the Center for Nonproliferation Studies, is a research and training center dedicated to addressing the global challenges posed by nuclear weapons and other weapons of mass destruction. It is the largest nongovernmental organization in the United States focused exclusively on nonproliferation issues. Its mission is to educate and train future generations of specialists in nonproliferation, and to provide timely analysis and information to support policy and research efforts. After a large endowment gift in 2007 by James Martin, CNS was renamed in his honor.

The headquarters of CNS is at the Middlebury Institute of International Studies at Monterey, in Monterey, California. In addition, CNS oversees the Vienna Center for Disarmament and Non-Proliferation in Vienna, Austria, and also maintains a significant presence at its offices in Washington, D.C., to facilitate engagement with policymakers, international organizations, and other stakeholders. CNS also publishes the Nonproliferation Review and NonPro Notes. In August 1998, CNS established the Newly Independent States Representative Office (NISRO) offices in Almaty, Kazakhstan, which was closed in 2009.

On August 26th, 2025, CNS announced that it would open new offices on the main Middlebury College campus in Vermont. The next day, on August 27th, the President of Middlebury College announced the closure of MIIS and that all academic programs at the institute would conclude sometime in July 2027. CNS, however, as a "self-sustaining center", will remain open in Monterey, and under the umbrella of Middlebury College after 2027.

== History ==
William C. "Bill" Potter was originally trained as a specialist on the Soviet Union, and in 1982 authored his first book, Nuclear Power and Nonproliferation, on the technological, economic, and political dimensions of nuclear nonproliferation. His research drew attention to similarities in Soviet and United States approaches to nuclear export controls and nonproliferation policy, as well as to the areas of cooperation that developed between the two states despite their rivalry during the Cold War. By the time of the Dissolution of the Soviet Union, Potter, at that time the director of the graduate school involved in Eurasian and Soviet studies at the Monterey Institute of International Studies (MIIS), was among the few scholars with expertise both in Soviet affairs and in the challenges posed by the spread of nuclear weapons.

In the time leading up to the Dissolution, Potter became increasingly concerned about the security of nuclear weapons and related materials. Potter, and many of his fellow global security scholars at the time, were predicting a collapse of the entire soviet economy. When that happened, they greatly feared that nuclear materials would both be available on a black market, and that if new states were created, they might each have access to fissile materials and nuclear weapons. Potter saw the need to address the academic and policy perspectives surrounding the study of proliferation and the advancement of nonproliferation.

Potter's primary motivation was in response to what he viewed as a lack of systematic, open-source research on proliferation. At the time, while conducting studies on international nuclear commerce, Potter noted that even researchers at the United States national laboratories were often unable to answer basic questions about nuclear trade. He argued that even though large amounts of relevant information were available in open sources and specialized trade publications, this material was rarely collected or analyzed in a systematic way.

CNS opened in 1989 with a small staff and limited resources, operating out of two offices with an initial budget of $35,000, becoming in the process one of the first academic institutions in the United States to focus exclusively on issues of nonproliferation.

Over the following decade, CNS expanded significantly, establishing itself as the only institution in the United States to offer a graduate certificate program in nonproliferation studies. By bringing together students, government officials, and researchers from around the world, the center sought to advance education and research on WMD's while contributing to international security.

=== Structure ===
By the early 2000s, CNS was organized into five research programs:

- Chemical and Biological Weapons Program
- East Asia Nonproliferation Program
- International Organization and Nonproliferation Program
- Weapons of Mass Destruction Terrorism Research Program
- Newly Independent States Nonproliferation Program

The programs have changed, both due to budgetary constraints and due to evolving realities in nonproliferation. For example, the term "NIS" to mean a Newly Independent State has become largely outdated, and especially for those states in Central Asia, the geographical preference is to refer to the regional names.

As of 2025, the programs of CNS are structured as;

- Chemical & Biological Weapons Nonproliferation Program (CBWNP), Director Allison Berke
- East Asia Nonproliferation Program (EANP), Director Jeffrey Lewis
- Eurasia Nonproliferation Program (ENP), Director Hanna Notte
- Export Control and Nonproliferation Program (XNP), Director Robert Shaw
- International Organizations & Nonproliferation Program (IONP), Director Gaukhar Mukhatzhanova
- Middle East Nonproliferation Program, Director Chen Kane
- Nonproliferation Education Program, Director Juan du Preez

== Publications and databases ==
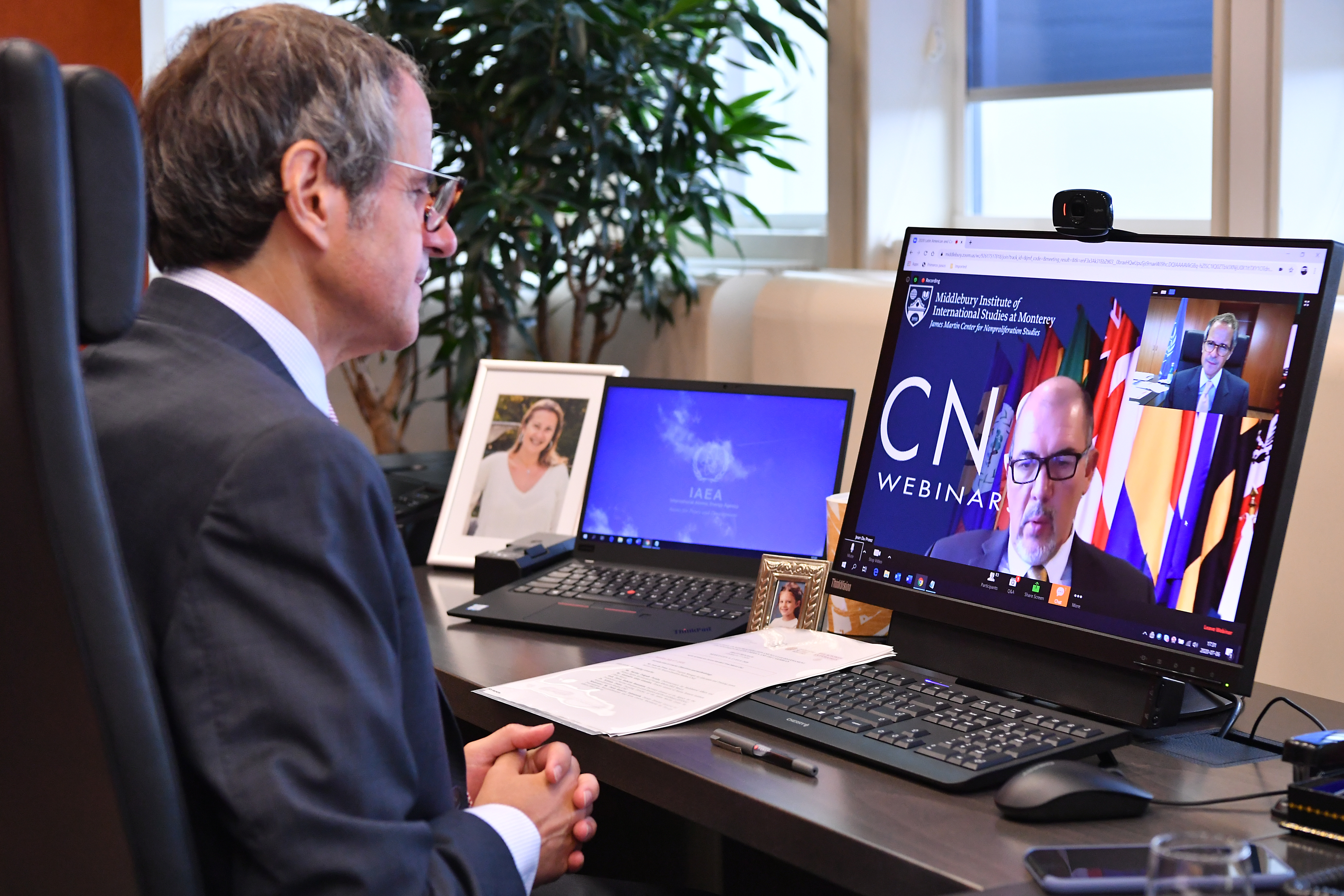
During the COVID-19 pandemic, many meetings of the CNS were forced into an online space. Featured here is IAEA Director General Rafael Mariano Grossi delivering his opening remarks at the 2020 Online Latin American and Caribbean Nonproliferation and Disarmament meeting.

Bill Potter initially proposed the idea of building a comprehensive database of open-source information to the U.S. Department of State, but the project was rejected as too costly. He subsequently pursued the initiative independently, purchasing software and hiring a small team of researchers and a programmer to develop what became known as the Emerging Nuclear Suppliers Database. This database compiled and analyzed international trade data relevant to nuclear technologies.

By the early 1990s, the CNS database was being used by both the U.S. government and the International Atomic Energy Agency (IAEA). Information gathered by Potter and his colleagues contributed to identifying elements of Iraq and Libya's nuclear programs and provided details on the proliferation activities of Abdul Qadeer Khan's network, which transferred nuclear technology to countries including Iran, North Korea, and Libya. The database and related projects became the foundation for CNS's broader work in applying open-source research to the study of weapons of mass destruction.

Prior to the year 1996, electronically-produced materials produced by CNS were only available on floppy disks under MS-DOS. The databases were expanded to new platforms in 1996, becoming accessible through both the Internet and Windows. The materials were organized with the Metamorph search engine, which allowed users to efficiently process a collection of more than 20,000 records drawn since 1986 from approximately 140 sources, including publications, news agencies, and unpublished material.

The CNS databases were divided into three main areas; nuclear materials and technologies, ballistic and cruise missile technologies, and nuclear developments in the former Soviet republics. The nuclear database monitored international trade and other developments in nuclear technology, while the missile database tracked trade in missile and missile defense systems. The database on the Commonwealth of Independent States (CIS) focused on regional nuclear developments. These resources were widely regarded as valuable for assessing nuclear and missile programs and identifying the transfer of technologies that contributed to their advancement.

Sandia National Laboratories was one of the first customers subscribed to CNS's web-based system, making use of the new automated online updates and advanced search functions. The CNS website also served as a portal linking to other major online resources in the field of defense and proliferation studies.

In 1997, CNS developed a specialized database focusing on China's arms control and nonproliferation policies. This initiative was launched as part of the East Asia Nonproliferation Project (EANP), which began in 1995 and included academic exchanges with students from Fudan University in Shanghai. The China-focused database project started in 1996 under the direction of Bates Gill, an East Asia security expert who had previously led the Project on Security and Arms Control in East Asia at the Stockholm International Peace Research Institute (SIPRI) and taught at the Johns Hopkins University Center for Chinese and American Studies in Nanjing.

The China Profiles database, available on CD-ROM and through paid subscription on CNS's website, compiled hundreds of official documents and provided a detailed analysis of shifts in China's stance on proliferation. It outlined China's official and unofficial cooperation with other countries in nuclear and missile programs, included an English-Chinese glossary of technical terms, provided a chronological record of relevant events, and identified key Chinese officials and organizations involved in civil and military nuclear programs, missile development, and arms exports.

The database documented China's refusal to formally join the Missile Technology Control Regime (MTCR) while committing to follow its guidelines, its intention to rejoin the Zangger Committee (ZAC), and its decision not to become a member of the Nuclear Suppliers Group (NSG), which enforced stricter export controls. It also detailed Chinese missile exports to countries such as Syria and Pakistan and provided information on the companies involved, including leadership and facility locations. Additional CNS projects were underway at the time to develop similar databases covering North and South Korea.

=== The Nonproliferation Review ===
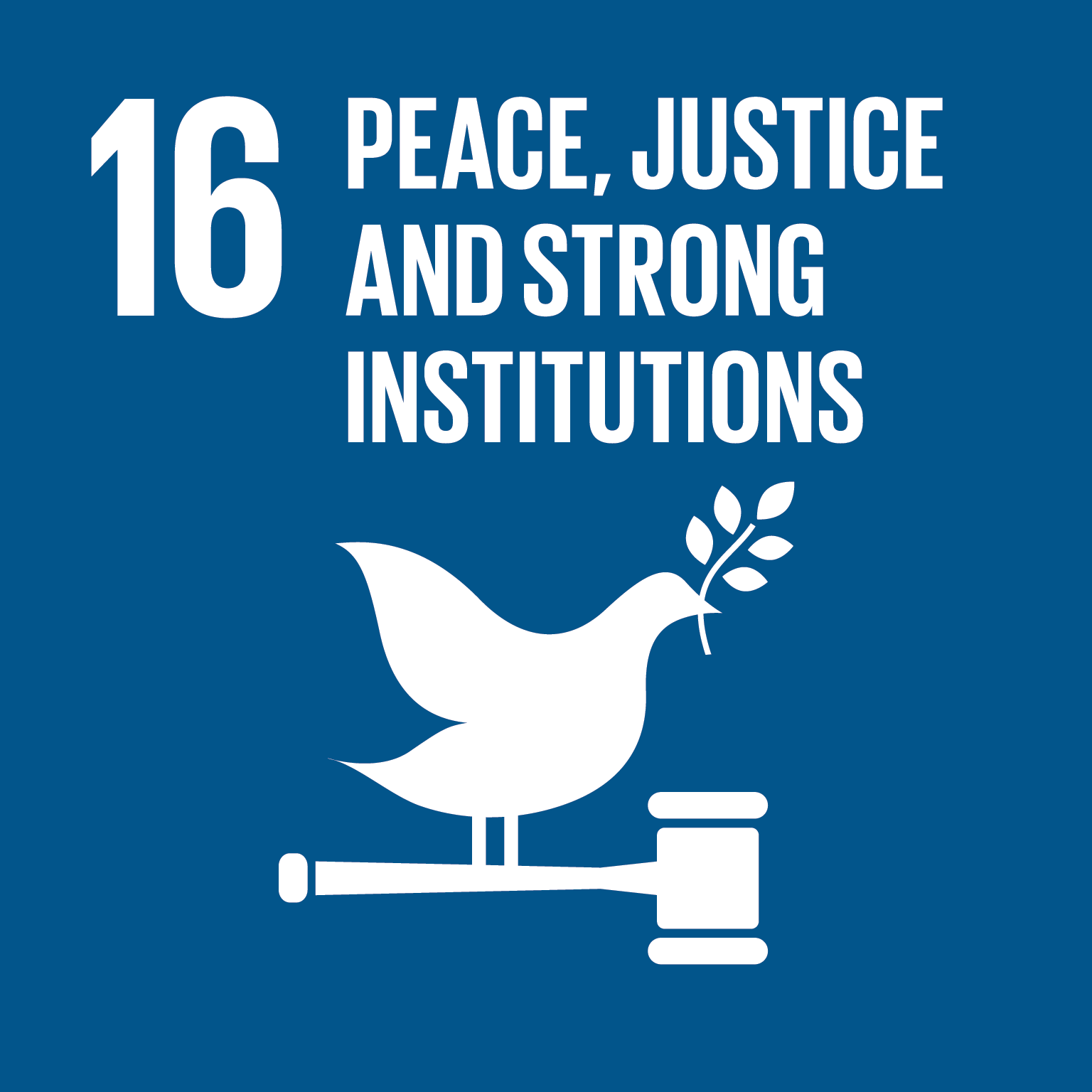
CNS, while not specifically within the framework of Sustainable Development Goal 16, fits within the broader scope and mandate of this SDG.

The Nonproliferation Review is a scholarly peer-reviewed and refereed journal that examines the spread of nuclear, chemical, and biological weapons and international efforts to limit or reverse that spread. The journal publishes case studies, theoretical analyses, historical accounts, research reports, viewpoints, and book reviews on subjects including state weapons programs, treaties and export controls, safeguards, verification and compliance, disarmament, terrorism, and the economic and environmental impacts of weapons proliferation. In other words its articles cover a broad range of topics, including; national weapons programs, treaty negotiations and implementation, export controls, verification systems, disarmament initiatives, terrorism involving weapons of mass destruction, and the wider political, economic, and environmental consequences of proliferation.

Contributions are written by both academics and practitioners, including former government officials and policy specialists. Since its establishment, the journal has been regarded as a reference point for researchers and policymakers concerned with arms control and nonproliferation.

Submissions undergo editorial screening and external peer review. Research articles are generally reviewed by multiple anonymous referees, while opinion pieces are evaluated through a lighter process, and book reviews are assessed directly by the editorial team. Special issues or sections may involve alternative review procedures depending on the editors' decisions.

=== NonPro Notes ===
Nonpro Notes is a publication series produced by the CNS office in Washington, D.C. The series features focused results from ongoing research, presenting methods, data, or tools that fall outside the scope of traditional peer-reviewed journals. Its purpose is to circulate preliminary insights and encourage further study and publication on issues related to nonproliferation.

== Center for Nonproliferation Studies in Washington, D.C. (CNS DC) ==
In order to more adequately facilitate communication between CNS and lawmakers in the city of Washington, D.C., the directors of CNS decided to establish their first satellite office in that city. The CNS DC office would be the primarily link between the "corridors of power", and the academics of CNS at MIIS.

CNS DC was opened in 1996 and headquartered on the 9th floor of Northwest 11 Dupont Circle. By 2001, the Executive Director was John Parachini and the Deputy Director was Leonard Spector. By the 1st of December 2006, it was relocated to the 12th floor of 1111 Nineteenth Street. On February 1, 2008, CNS DC announced that it had moved into its current offices at 1400 K Street Northwest.

CNS DC engages with U.S. government agencies, international organizations, and policy makers. CNS conducts analysis, training programs, and provides policy advice to lawmakers and other stakeholders on CBRN weapons nonproliferation. It facilitates interaction between academic research at CNS and policy discussions, supporting initiatives and collaboration among governmental and non-governmental actors. Through workshops, seminars, and briefings, the office contributes to U.S. and international efforts aimed at preventing the spread of weapons of mass destruction.

== Newly Independent States Representative Office (NISRO) ==
Newly Independent States Representative Office
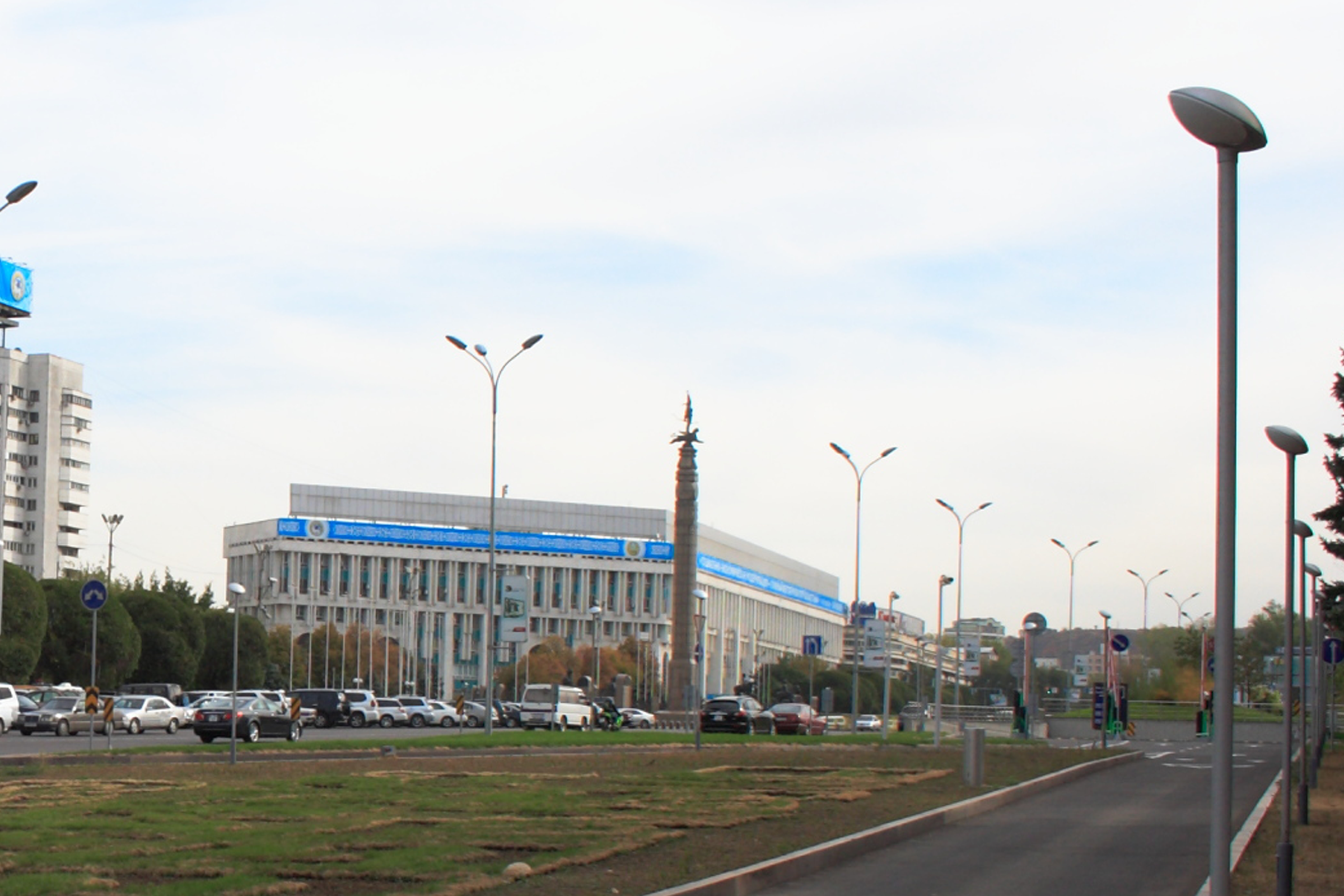
- Established: August, 1998
- Head: Dauren Abe
- Key people: Cristina Hansell, Elena K. Sokova, Margarita Kalinina-Pohl
- Owner: Center for Nonproliferation Studies
- Address: 15 Ploshchad Respubliki
- Location: Almaty, Kazakhstan
- Website: https://web.archive.org/web/20110319214326/http://cns.miis.edu:80/programs/nisnp/nisro.htm
- Dissolved: 2009

Following the dissolution of the Soviet Union, Kazakhstan inherited an extensive nuclear infrastructure, including more than 1,400 strategic warheads, which were subsequently transferred to Russia. Kazakhstan renounced nuclear weapons, shut down the fast breeder reactor at Aktau, and decommissioned the Semipalatinsk nuclear test site, which had been the largest of its kind in the world. The country also became a leading advocate for the establishment of a Central Asian Nuclear-Weapon-Free Zone.

In August 1998, CNS established the NIS Representative Office (NISRO) in Almaty, Kazakhstan.

In discussions with representatives of CNS at the NISRO, former government official Dastan Eleukenov emphasized that Kazakhstan had eliminated its nuclear weapons material stockpiles but warned that the enforcement of export controls remained critical for regional security. Analysts also observed that, despite national safeguards and control systems in Kazakhstan and neighboring Central Asian states, vulnerabilities persisted in the management of nuclear facilities.

CNS launched a two-year project to evaluate United States assistance programs in the former Soviet Union, with particular attention to their effectiveness in reducing proliferation risks. The initiative was partly motivated by debates in Washington, D.C., over the value of these programs in the lead-up to the 2000 presidential elections in both the United States and Russia. A distinctive feature of the project was the involvement of the CNS "core group" of scientists, officials, journalists, and academics from the former Soviet Union, many of whom had access to information and facilities not typically available to Western analysts.

The study was supported by a two-year grant from the Smith Richardson Foundation and began in the autumn of 1998 with the establishment of an expert advisory board in Monterey, California. Five working groups were formed to address key areas of U.S. nonproliferation assistance:

- Working Group 1: missile dismantlement and nuclear weapons protection, control, and accounting
- Working Group 2: nuclear submarine dismantlement and naval fuel-cycle operations
- Working Group 3: chemical and biological weapons elimination
- Working Group 4: material protection, control, and accounting at civilian facilities
- Working Group 5: efforts to prevent illicit trafficking, mitigate the "brain drain" of scientific expertise, and strengthen export controls.

The first meetings of these groups were convened in the NISRO in November 1998.

Over the course of the project, more than 30 individual studies were commissioned and over 400 interviews were conducted with specialists in both the former Soviet republics and the United States. Additional workshops took place in Moscow, Washington, and other capitals to review findings and refine research questions. To ensure comparability across different issue areas, all authors followed a standardized framework of questions addressing the nature of proliferation threats, the organizations involved, criteria for evaluating program success, and the sustainability of activities in the absence of U.S. funding. Each working group also developed supplementary questions relevant to its area of focus.

The NISRO was shuttered in 2009, but CNS still maintains a large network in Central Asia.

== Vienna Center for Disarmament and Non-Proliferation (VCDNP) ==
Vienna Center for Disarmament and Non-Proliferation
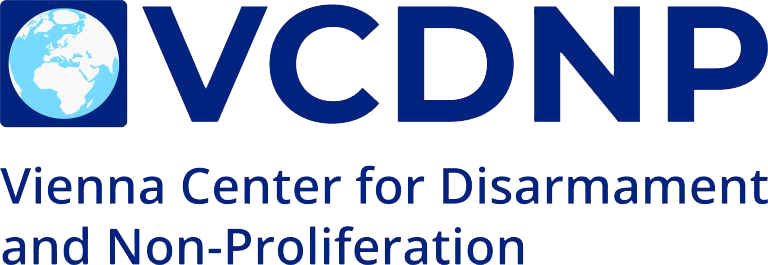
- Established: February 25th, 2011
- Head: Elena K. Sokova
- Key people: Edith Bursac, Noah Mayhew
- Owner: Austrian Federal Ministry for European and International Affairs; James Martin Center for Nonproliferation Studies
- Address: Donau-City Strasse 6, Andromeda Tower, Floor 13/1, 1220 Vienna
- Location: Vienna, Austria
- Website: vcdnp.org

The Vienna Center for Disarmament and Non-Proliferation (VCDNP) is an international non-governmental organization based in Vienna, Austria. It was created in 2010 at the initiative of the Austrian Federal Ministry for European and International Affairs and formally opened in 2011. The center's stated purpose is to advance peace and security by serving as a platform for independent analysis and dialogue on nuclear disarmament and nonproliferation.

VCDNP organizes conferences, seminars, and workshops that bring together representatives of international organizations, governments, academia, and civil society. It also undertakes research, training, and outreach activities, often in partnership with universities, research institutes, and international bodies. The center is managed by the James Martin Center for Nonproliferation Studies, part of the Middlebury Institute of International Studies at Monterey.

VCDNP conducts a number of educational and outreach programs. These include short intensive courses on non-proliferation and disarmament designed for diplomats and other practitioners. The center also emphasizes engagement with younger professionals, with particular attention to supporting women through mentorship and outreach initiatives. Its capacity-building role in these areas has been acknowledged in United Nations General Assembly resolutions, most recently resolution A/RES/77/81 adopted in 2022.

In addition to training and mentorship, VCDNP has engaged with parliamentarians to highlight their responsibilities in promoting adherence to international legal instruments on arms control and non-proliferation. The center also reaches wider audiences by hosting webinars and hybrid events, many of which are made publicly accessible through online recordings.

=== History ===
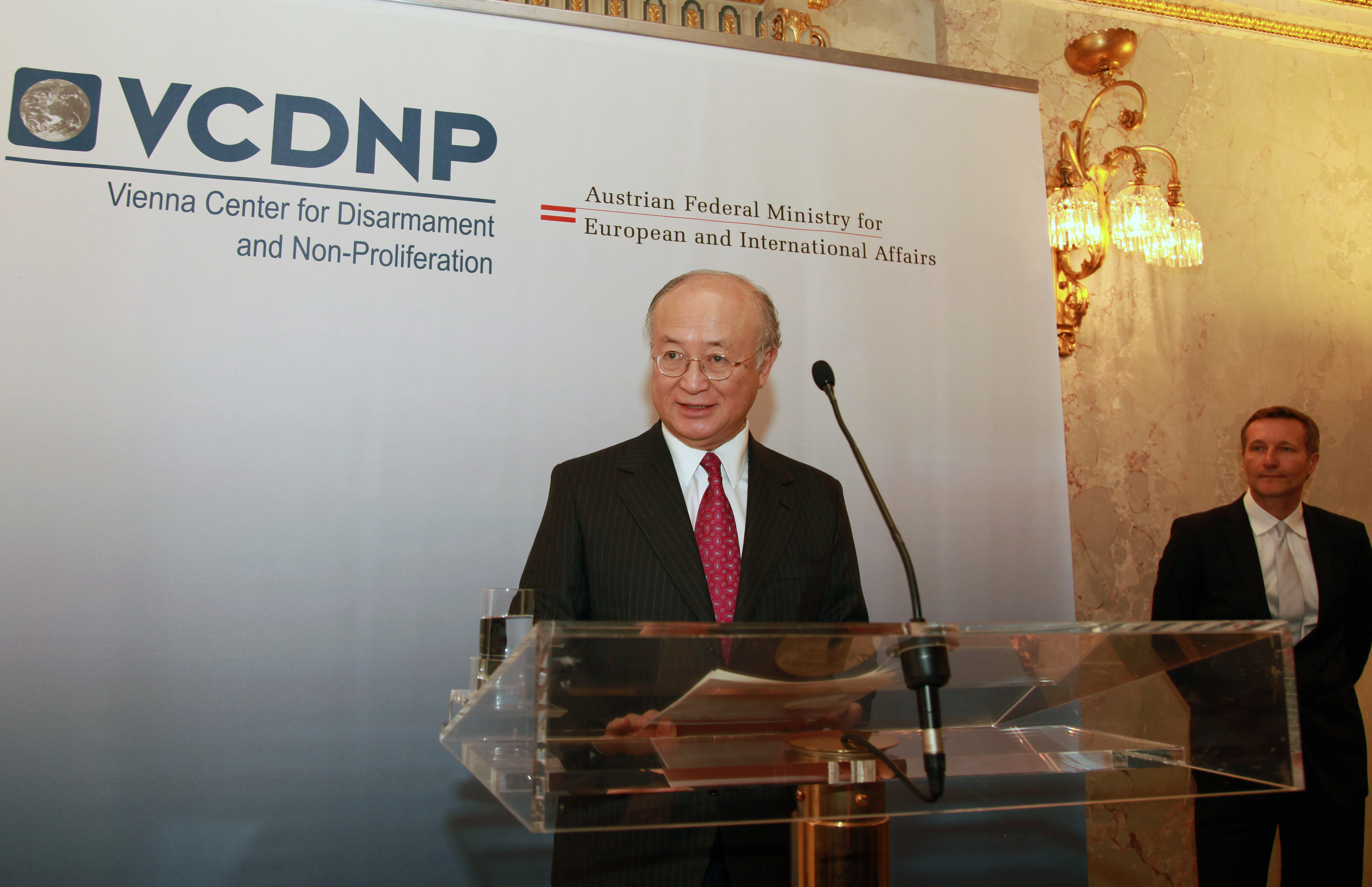
Yukiya Amano (left) and Michael Spindelegger (right) at the opening ceremony of VCDNP in 2011

On February 25th, 2011, in Vienna, the Preparatory Commission for the Comprehensive Nuclear-Test-Ban Treaty Organization (CTBTO) established a collaboration with CNS for the stated purpose to enhance its capacity to address challenges related to the Comprehensive Nuclear-Test-Ban Treaty (CTBT). The partnership was formalized on with the agreement signed by Tibor Tóth, the Executive Secretary of the CTBTO, and Sunder Ramaswamy, the President of the Monterey Institute at the time. Under the agreement, the two organizations developed a series of training courses that covered the technical, scientific, political, and legal aspects of the Treaty and its verification regime.

The Austrian Foreign Minister Michael Spindelegger stated at the opening ceremony that it would encourage open and constructive dialogue among governments, organizations, and civil society on matters relating to WMDs and nonproliferation. He expressed optimism that the Centre would stimulate debate in Vienna and contribute to international discourse on disarmament and nonproliferation issues.

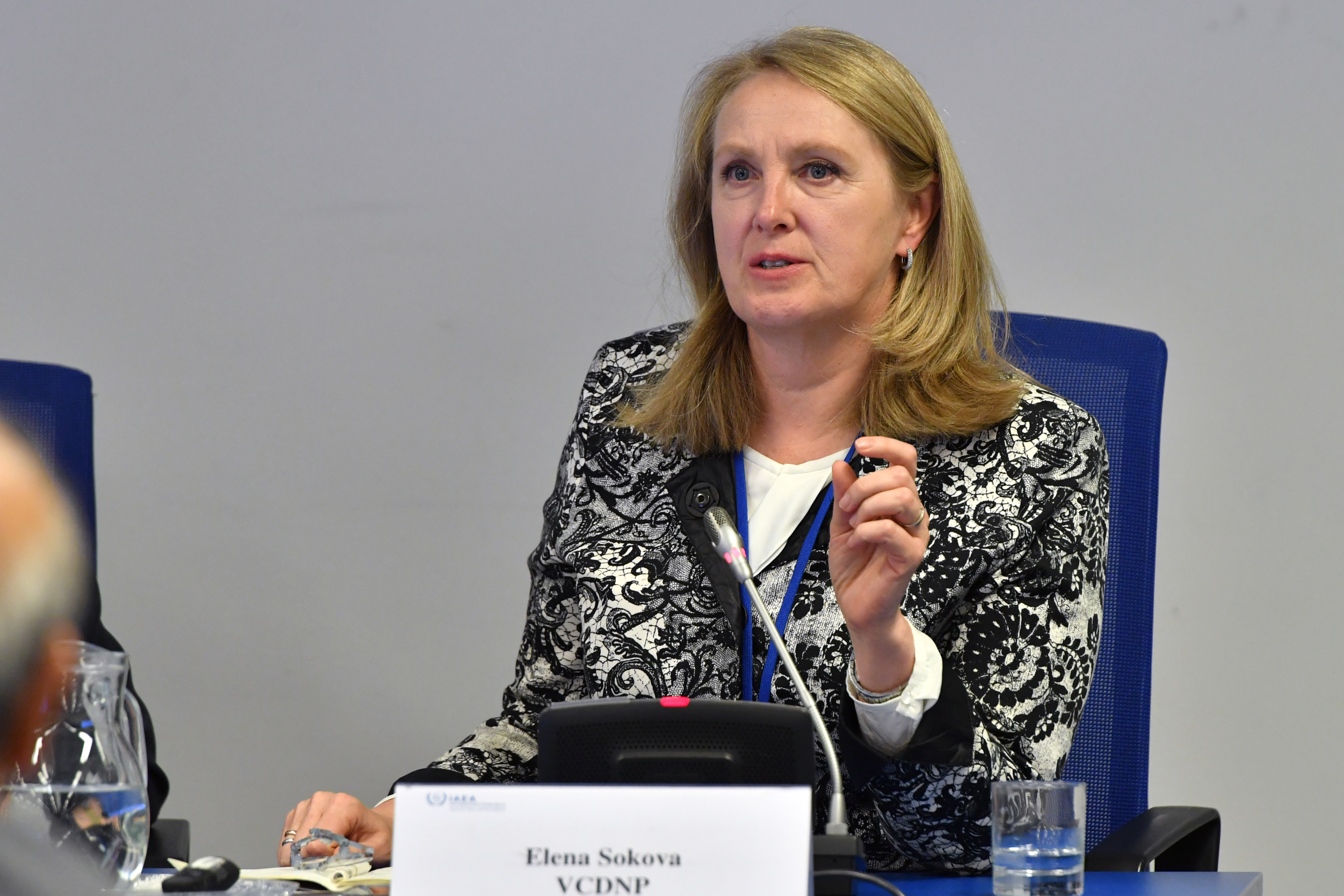
Elena K. Sokova is the Executive Director of the VCDNP.

At the event, Tibor Tóth stressed the need for: "an army of experts instead of experts of the army", made note of his desire and the importance of training hundreds, if not thousands, of individuals with expertise in disarmament, non-proliferation, and arms control, particularly in relation to nuclear weapons prohibition. Yukiya Amano, Director General of the International Atomic Energy Agency (IAEA), said that VCDNP would contribute to maintaining and strengthening momentum toward a world free of nuclear weapons and that education in disarmament and non-proliferation had a special role to play.

Bill Potter, Director of CNS, said at the ceremony that advancing nuclear risk reduction required fostering an informed and active civil society and investing in education and training on disarmament and non-proliferation. He added that CNS looked forward to collaborating with the Austrian Foreign Ministry and Vienna-based international organizations to strengthen the role of civil society and help establish Vienna as a leading hub of non-governmental expertise and activity in disarmament and non-proliferation.

== Books by CNS staff ==
The following books have been authored by CNS staff:

- Nuclear Weapons Security Crises: What Does History Teach? Controlling Soviet/Russian Nuclear Weapons in Times of Instability, Nikolai Sokov
- Tactical Nuclear Weapons and Euro-Atlantic Security: The Future of NATO, Miles Pomper, Dr. Nikolai Sokov, Paolo Foradori
- The Soviet Biological Weapons Program, Milton Leitenberg and Raymond A. Zilinskas, contributing author Jens H. Kuhn, July 2012
- The Nuclear Politics of the Non-Aligned Movement: Principles versus Pragmatism, William C. Potter and Gaukhar Mukhatzhanova, 2012
- UNIDIR Disarmament Forum: Maritime Security, K. Vignard, V. Sakhuja, S. Bateman, R. Smith, J. Lewis, P. Maxon, Joshua Newman, and Dawn Verdugo, 2010
- When Empire Meets Nationalism: Power Politics in the U.S. and Russia, Didier Chaudet, Florent Parmentier, and Benoît Pélopidas, October 2009
- Implementing Resolution 1540: The Role of Regional Organizations, Lawrence Scheinman, editor, September 2008
- English Translation of Analysis of China's National Interests, by Dr. Yan Xue-tong, April 2008
- Strait Talk: Avoiding a Nuclear War between the United States and China over Taiwan, Dr. Monte R. Bullard, 2004 and 2008
- Missile Contagion: Cruise Missile Proliferation and the Threat to International Security, Dennis M. Gormley, 2008
- Nuclear Weapons and Nonproliferation: A Reference Handbook: Second Edition, Sarah Diehl & James Clay Moltz, 2007
- War of Nerves, Jonathan B. Tucker, 2006
- The Four Faces of Nuclear Terrorism, Charles D. Ferguson, William C. Potter, Amy Sands, Leonard S. Spector, and Fred L. Wehling, 2005
- Preventing Nuclear Meltdown: Managing Decentralization of Russia's Nuclear Complex, James Clay Moltz, Vladimir A. Orlov, and Adam N. Stulberg, 2004
- China and India: Cooperation or Conflict?, Waheguru Pal Singh Sidhu & Jing-dong Yuan, 2003
- Nuclear Weapons and Nonproliferation: A Reference Handbook, Sarah Diehl & James Clay Moltz, 2002
- Chemical and Biological Warfare: A Comprehensive Survey for the Concerned Citizen, Eric Croddy, December 2001
- Scourge: The Once and Future Threat of Smallpox, Jonathan B. Tucker, September 2001
- Toxic Terror: Assessing Terrorist Use of Chemical and Biological Weapons, Jonathan B. Tucker, ed., April 2000
- Yadernoe Nerasprostranenie (Nuclear Nonproliferation), Vladimir Orlov & Nikolai Sokov, ed., 2000
- The North Korean Nuclear Program: Security, Strategy, and New Perspectives from Russia James Clay Moltz & Alexandre Mansourov, ed., October 1999

== See also ==
- Nuclear Threat Initiative
- Nonproliferation Policy Education Center
- Center for Arms Control and Non-Proliferation
- Chemical and Biological Arms Control Institute
