= John Potter =

John Potter may refer to:

== Law and politics ==
- John Potter (Maine lawyer) (1787–1865), American politician in Maine
- Sir John Potter (Liberal politician) (1815–1858), English MP
- John F. Potter (1817–1899), U.S. representative from Wisconsin
- John Potter Jr. (1821–1879), American politician in Wisconsin
- John Potter (Conservative politician) (1873–1940), English MP
- John Potter (Canadian politician) (1911–1985)
- John William Potter (1918–2013), U.S. federal judge
- John M. Potter (1924–1993), American politician in Wisconsin

== Sports ==
- John Potter (fencer) (1910–1991), American fencer
- John Potter (cricketer) (born 1949), English cricketer
- John Potter (footballer) (born 1979), Scottish footballer
- John Potter (racing driver) (born 1982), American race car driver
- John Potter (American football) (born 1990), American football player

== Others ==
- John Potter (bishop) (c. 1674–1747), English archbishop
- John Potter (priest) (1713–1770), English clergyman
- John Potter (writer) (fl. 1754–1804), English writer and composer
- John Gerald Potter (1829–1908), English wallpaper manufacturer and art patron
- John Lishman Potter (1834–1931), New Zealand goldminer, stonemason and builder
- John Milton Potter (1906–1947), American academic administrator
- John Deane Potter (1912–1981), British journalist
- John Potter (chemist) (1927–2017), English chemist
- John E. Potter (born 1956), United States Postmaster General
- John Potter (musician), English tenor

== See also ==
- Jack Potter (born 1938), Australian cricketer
- Jon Potter (born 1963), field hockey player
- Jonathan Potter (born 1956), British professor and originator of discursive psychology
- Jonathan Potter (cricketer) (born 1971), English cricketer
- Jonathan Potter (computer programmer), Australian programmer
