= James Potter =

James Potter may refer to:

- James Potter (Pennsylvania politician) (1729–1789), soldier, farmer, and politician from Pennsylvania
- James Potter (baseball) (1864–1934), American businessman and owner of baseball club the Philadelphia Phillies
- James B. Potter Jr. (born 1931), Los Angeles, California, City Council member
- James C. Potter (1855–1925), American engineer, inventor, businessman and civic leader
- Jimmy Potter (born 1941), Northern Irish former footballer
- James Potter (character), father of Harry Potter in the Harry Potter series
- James Sirius Potter, son of Harry Potter in the Harry Potter series
