= Christopher Potter =

Christopher or Chris Potter may refer to:

- Christopher Potter (provost) (1591–1646), English academic, clergyman and provost of The Queen's College, Oxford
- Christopher Potter (MP) (1750–1817), English manufacturer, contractor, and MP for Colchester
- Christopher Potter (author) (born 1959), former publisher and managing director of Fourth Estate
- Chris Potter (actor) (born 1960), Canadian actor, musician and pitchman
- Chris Potter (jazz saxophonist) (born 1971), American jazz saxophonist, composer, and multi-instrumentalist
- Chris Potter (record producer), British music producer and mixer
- Chris Potter (priest) (born 1969), Dean of St Asaph
- Chris Potter, fictional character on sitcom Kenan and Kel played by Dan Frischman
