= Bert Potter =

Bert Potter may refer to:

- Bert Potter (1925–2012), co-creator of the New Zealand commune Centrepoint
- Bert Potter (composer) (1874–1930), composer of popular songs
