= Edmund Gayton =

Edmund Gayton (1608–1666) was an English academic, physician and writer, now considered a hack writer.

== Life ==
The son of George Gayton of Little Britain, London, he was born there 30 November 1608. In 1623 he entered Merchant Taylors' School, and went to St John's College, Oxford, in 1625. He proceeded B.A. 30 April 1629, and M.A. 9 May 1633, and was elected fellow of his college.

Gayton visited the wits in London, and claimed to be a "son of Ben", one of Ben Jonson's followers (the sons of Ben). In 1636 he was appointed superior beadle (bedel) in arts and physic in Oxford University, and was in the same year one of the actors in Love's Hospital, or the Hospital for Lovers, a dramatic entertainment provided by William Laud when the king and queen were his guests at St. John's College (30 August 1636).

Gayton studied medicine and received a dispensation from the parliamentary delegates for the degree of bachelor of physic 1 February 1648. In 1648, however, the delegates expelled him from his beadleship.

In London, Gayton became a professional writer. He composed verses for the pageant of Lord Mayor John Dethick, exhibited 29 October 1655, the first allowed since Oliver Cromwell was in power; when the performance took place Gayton was in a debtors' prison. On 22 September 1655 he was taken to the Wood Street counter, and in 1659 was moved to the King's Bench Prison.

Later, in 1659, Gayton was in Suffolk. At the Restoration of 1660 he again became beadle at Oxford, and wrote many broadside verses. He died in his lodgings on Cat Street, Oxford, 12 December 1666, and was buried in St Mary's Church. Seven days before his death he had published his Glorious and Living Cinque Ports. When convocation proceeded three days after his death to elect a new beadle, Gayton was denounced by the vice-chancellor, John Fell, as "an ill husband and so improvident that he had but one farthing in his pocket when he died".

== Works ==
His contemporaries had a low opinion of Gayton as an author. His major work was Pleasant Notes upon Don Quixot (London, 1654), in the headlines of the pages called "Festivous Notes". It is a gossipy and anecdotal commentary in four books, in prose and verse, with quotations, social asides, and references to the theatre. There is prefatory verse by John Speed, Anthony Hodges, and others. An expurgated, corrected, and abbreviated edition appeared in 1768 as Festivous Notes on the History and Adventures of the Renowned Don Quixote; its editor, John Potter, described Gayton as "a man of sense, a scholar, and a wit".

Gayton's other works were:

- Chartæ Scriptæ, or a new Game at Cards call'd Play by the Booke, printed in 1645; fantastic verse description of a pack of cards.
- Charity Triumphant, or the Virgin Hero. Exhibited 29 Oct. 1655, being the Lord Mayor's Day, London, 1655, dedicated to Alderman John Dethick.
- Hymnus de Febribus, London, 1655, dedicated to William, Marquess of Hertford, with commendatory verse by Francis Aston: an account in Latin elegiac verse of the symptoms and causes of fevers.
- Will. Bagnall's Ghost, or the Merry Devil of Gadmunton in his Perambulation of the Prisons of London, London, 1655, in prose and verse. Against William Bagwell.
- The Art of Longevity, or A Diæteticall Institution, London; printed for the author 1659, dedicated to Elizabeth, wife of John Rous of Henham Hall, Suffolk. Sir Robert Stapylton, E. Aldrich, Captain Francis Aston, and others prefix verses. The book is a verse description of the wholesomeness or otherwise of various foods.
- Wit Revived, or a new excellent way of Divertisement digested into most ingenious Questions and Answers, London, 1660, under the pseudonym "Asdryasdust Tossoffacan".
- Poem upon Mr. Jacob Bobard's Yewmen of the Guards to the Physic Garden to the tune of the Counter Scuffle, Oxford, 1662.
- Diegerticon ad Britanniam, Oxford, 1662.
- The Religion of a Physician, or Divine Meditations on the Grand and Lesser Festivals, London, 1663.
- The Glorious and Living Cinque Ports of our fortunate Island twice happy in the Person of his Sacred Majestie (Oxford, 1666), poems in heroic verse addressed to naval leaders engaged in the Four Days' Battle of the Second Anglo-Dutch War, June 1666.
- Poem written from Oxon. to Mr. Rob. Whitehall at the Wells at Astrop, Oxford, 1666. An answer prepared by Robert Whitehall was not printed.

Gayton also edited Harry Martens Familiar Letters to his Lady of Delight, Oxford, 1663. He was the author of a parodic sermon, put in the mouth of the chaplain of John Hewson, on how to wax boots: Walk, Knaves, Walk; a discourse intended to have been spoken at Court. … By Hodge Turberville, chaplain to the late lord Hewson, London. He also produced two Oxford broadsides, Epulæ Oxonienses, or a jocular relation of a banquet presented to the best of kings by the best of prelates, in the year 1636, in the Mathematic Library at St. Jo. Bapt. Coll. (song with music in two parts), and A Ballad on the Gyants in the Physic Garden in Oxon., Oxford, 1662.

== Notes ==
Attribution

This article incorporates text from a publication now in the public domain: Stephen, Leslie, ed. (1890). "Gayton, Edmund". Dictionary of National Biography. Vol. 21. London: Smith, Elder & Co.
