= Ottumwa Cemetery =

- Ottumwa Cemetery Historic District
- U.S. National Register of Historic Places
- U.S. Historic district
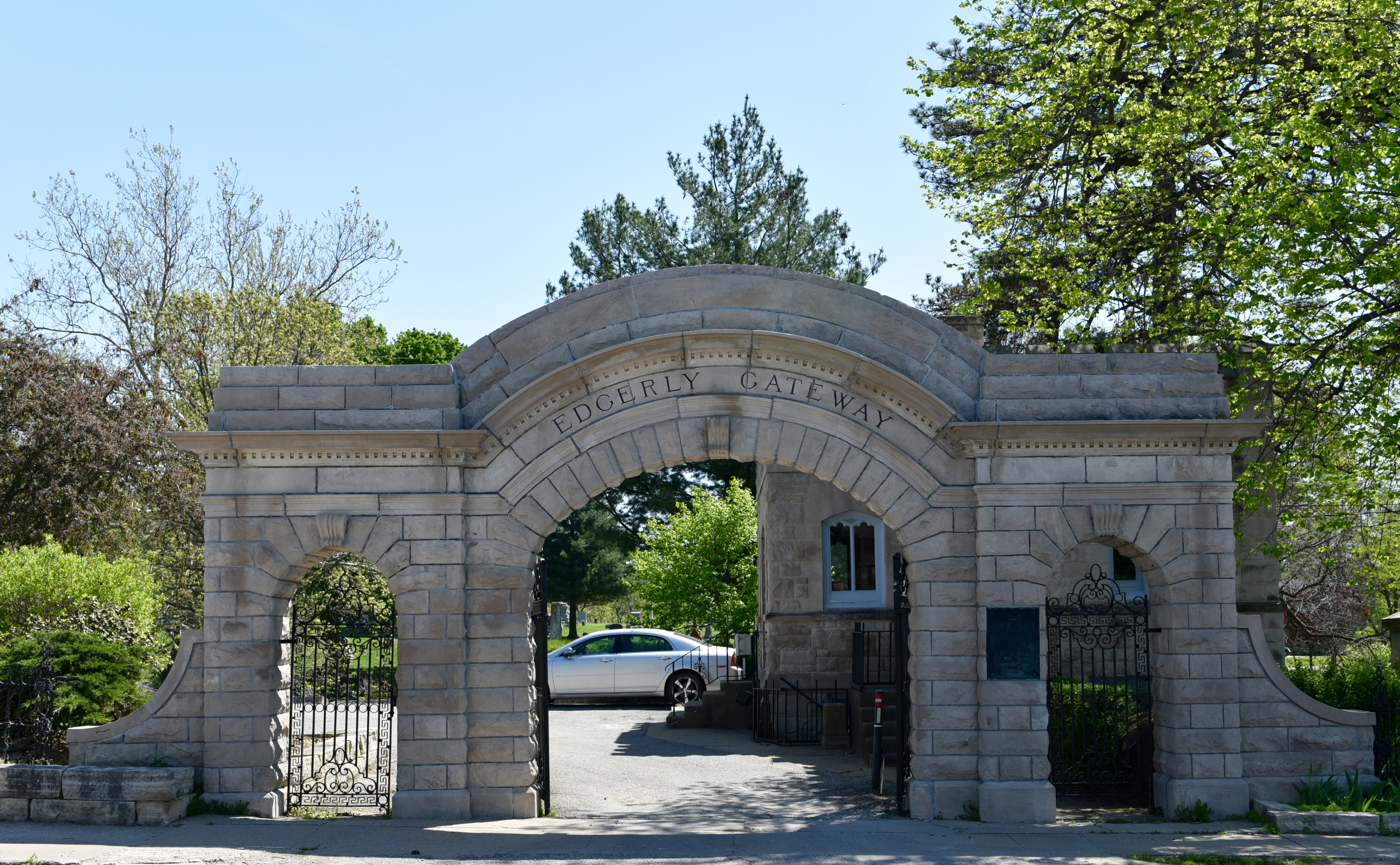

- Location within Iowa Location within the United States
- Location: 1302 N. Court St. Ottumwa, Iowa
- Coordinates: 41°1′59″N 92°24′31″W
- Area: less than one acre
- Architect: George M. Kerns; T. C. Link
- Architectural style: Late Gothic Revival
- MPS: Ottumwa MPS
- NRHP reference No.: 95000968
- Added to NRHP: August 11, 1995

Ottumwa Cemetery is a public cemetery located in Ottumwa, Iowa, United States. The entrance area of the cemetery forms a historic district that was listed on the National Register of Historic Places in 1995. At the time of its nomination it was composed of four resources, which included two contributing buildings and two contributing structures.

== History ==
The cemetery was established in 1857 when the community outgrew the old cemetery, which was located closer to the downtown area. Ottumwa Cemetery began with 10 acres (4.0 ha). The lots were laid in a grid pattern with meandering roads along the hillsides. It forms an arboretum that contains trees and shrubs that have been planted throughout the city's history. It was listed on the National Register of Historic Places in 1995 as a part of the Ottumwa MPS.

== Architecture ==
An ornate receiving vault was built in the cemetery in 1887. It is composed of red brick with terra cotta panels. It was designed in the Gothic Revival style. A wrought iron fence was put up along Court Street just after the vault was built. The Edgerly Gateway provides the main entrance into the cemetery. The limestone arch was built in the classical style of a Triumphal Roman arch in 1904. Two years later the combination office and chapel building was built in the Gothic Revival style. It was dedicated to the Union soldiers and sailors who fought in the American Civil War. The building features arched windows and crenelated roofline.

== Notable burials ==
- Leonidas M. Godley (1836–1904), Medal of Honor recipient from the Civil War
- Herschel C. Loveless (1911–1989), Governor of Iowa
- Thomas J. Potter (1840–1888), railroad executive of Union Pacific Railroad
- Daniel F. Steck (1881–1950), U.S. Senator from Iowa
- One British Commonwealth war grave, of a World War I Royal Flying Corps Cadet.
