= Judge Potter =

Judge Potter may refer to:

- Emery D. Potter (1804–1896), judge of the circuit court for the northern counties of Ohio, and of the court of common pleas
- Henry Potter (judge) (1766–1857), judge of the United States District Court for the Albemarle, Cape Fear and Pamptico Districts of North Carolina
- John William Potter (1918–2013), judge of the United States District Court for the Northern District of Ohio
- Mark Potter (judge) (born 1937), English judge of the High Court of Justice, Queen's Bench Division and of the Northern Circuit before becoming a Lord Justice of Appeal
- Robert Daniel Potter (1923–2009), judge of the United States District Court for the Western District of North Carolina

== See also ==
- Justice Potter (disambiguation)
