= William Potter (cricketer, born 1799) =

English cricketer

- Born: c. 1799; Wandsworth, London
- Died: 16 September 1853 (aged 53–54); Wandsworth, London
- Occupation: Cricketer

William Potter (c. 1799 – 16 September 1853) was an English cricketer with amateur status. He was associated with Surrey and made his debut in 1829. He twice played for the Gentlemen against the Players, in 1829 and 1830.

== Bibliography ==
- Haygarth, Arthur (1996) [1862]. Scores & Biographies, Volume 1 (1744–1826). Kennington: Frederick Lillywhite. ISBN 978-19-00592-23-9.
- Haygarth, Arthur (1997) [1862]. Scores & Biographies, Volume 2 (1827–1840). Kennington: Frederick Lillywhite. ISBN 978-19-00592-23-9.
