= Chemical and Biological Arms Control Institute =

American-based research organization

The Chemical and Biological Arms Control Institute was a private, nonprofit, nonpartisan policy research organization established in 1993 to address the challenges to global security and stability in the early 21st century, with a special, but not exclusive focus on the elimination of chemical weapons and biological weapons.

The Institute's research program was designed to alert leaders in government, industry, media, and the scientific community to problems before they became crises, to challenge conventional wisdom in light of new realities, and to promote the integration of diverse perspectives into decision options that effectively balance competing interests. CBACI attempted to stress studies and analyses whose hallmarks were their anticipatory nature, action orientation, integrative approach, policy focus, and political realism.

CBACI ceased operations in 2007.
