= Jimmy Potter =

Northern Irish footballer

Personal information
- Full name: James Potter
- Date of birth: 20 November 1941 (age 84)
- Place of birth: Belfast, Northern Ireland
- Date of death: 1st May 2019
- Place of death: Sunderland
- Position: Wing half

Senior career*
Years	Team	Apps	(Gls)
1958–1963	Sunderland	0	(0)
1963–1964	Darlington	19	(1)
–	Linfield		
- * Club domestic league appearances and goals

James Potter (born 20 November 1941) is a Northern Irish former footballer who played as a wing half in the Football League for Darlington. He began his career as a youngster with Sunderland, without playing first-team football for the club, and after leaving Darlington he returned to his native Northern Ireland to join Linfield.
