= Stephen Potter (disambiguation) =

Stephen Potter (1900–1969) was a British writer.

Stephen or Steve Potter may also refer to:

- Stephen Potter (judge) (1727–1793), American judge and politician in Rhode Island
- Stephen Potter (officer) (1896–1918), American-born officer who flew for the British Navy in World War I, after whom USS Stephen Potter is named
  - USS Stephen Potter
- Steve Potter (footballer) (born 1955), English footballer
- Steve Potter (American football) (born 1957), American football player.
- Stephen Potter (active 2009–2014), leader of the defunct For Darwen Party in Blackburn, England
- Stephen Potter, Australian filmmaker with Natasha Wanganeen and others of 2022 short film Bunker: The Last Fleet
