= Justice Potter =

Justice Potter may refer to:

- Charles N. Potter (1852–1927), associate justice of the Wyoming Supreme Court
- Elisha R. Potter (1811–1882), associate justice of the Rhode Island Supreme Court
- Mark Potter (judge) (born 1937), English judge Lord Justice of Appeal of the Court of Appeal of England and Wales
- Stephen Potter (judge) (1727–1793), associate justice of the Rhode Island Supreme Court
- William W. Potter (Michigan politician) (1869–1940), associate justice and chief justice of the Michigan Supreme Court

== See also ==
- Potter Stewart (1915–1985), associate justice of the United States Supreme Court
- Judge Potter (disambiguation)
