= Mary Potter =

Mary Potter may refer to:

- Mary Potter (nun) (1847–1913), British nurse and nun
- Mary Potter (painter) (1900–1981), English painter
- Mary C. Potter (born 1930), American psychologist
- Mary D' Potter, a 2001 Philippine television series
