= John Potter (writer) =

English dramatic and miscellaneous writer and composer

John Potter (fl. 1754–1804) was an English dramatic and miscellaneous writer, and composer. He was also involved in espionage, and was a physician. The Oxford Dictionary of National Biography warns that details of his life are still unclear, and that there is possible confusion with at least one other of the same name.

== Life ==
Born in London about 1734, he has been identified as son of John Potter, the vicar of Cloford in Somerset. In 1756 he established at Exeter a weekly paper, called The Devonshire Inspector.

Acquainted with David Garrick in London, Potter wrote prologues and epilogues. Through Garrick he was introduced to Jonathan Tyers, the proprietor of Vauxhall Gardens, and became a prolific composer of musical entertainment there. To The Public Ledger he contributed theatrical criticism, and in "The Rosciad, or a Theatrical Register", attacked Garrick. In November 1766 he charged Garrick with having slandered him to Tyers; Garrick denied the imputation, but brought up the authorship of the "Rosciad".

In 1777 Potter quarrelled with Tyers's successors at Vauxhall, and resigned his position there. He went abroad, and (according to David Erskine Baker) gathered intelligence for the government, as a spy. In 1784 he seems to have graduated M.D. at Edinburgh, and was admitted in London a licentiate of the Royal College of Physicians on 30 September 1785; he was then described as a native of Oxfordshire. He practised medicine at Enniscorthy, but left during the Irish Rebellion of 1798.

Potter's date of death is not known, but is presumed to be after 1813.

== Works ==
Observations on the present State of Music and Musicians, with general rules for studying Music; to which is added a Scheme for erecting and supporting a Musical Academy in this Kingdom (1762) came from lectures at Gresham College. Of two pieces produced at Drury Lane Theatre, The Rites of Hecate (1763) had music by Potter, and Hymen is thought to have had some also. In 1765 The Choice of Apollo, a serenata with music by William Yates, which was performed at the Haymarket Theatre, had words by Potter. Volumes of his Vauxhall compositions were published.

In 1766 Potter published The Hobby Horse, a satire in Hudibrastic verse, directed at Garrick. Potter's dramatic criticism was collected in The Theatrical Review, supposedly written by "a society of gentlemen independent of managerial influence". Other works which Potter issued during this period of his career were:

- The Words of the Wise, 1768, moral subjects digested into chapters;
- An edition of Edmund Gayton's Festivous Notes on Don Quixote, 1768;
- Music in Mourning, or Fiddlestick in the Suds, a burlesque satire on a certain Mus. Doc., 1780. Against John Abraham Fisher.
- A series of novels, comprising in the end History and Adventures of Arthur O'Bradley, (1769); The Curate of Coventry, (1771); The Virtuous Villagers, (1784); The Favourites of Felicity, (1785); and Frederic, or the Libertine, (1790).

In 1803, when living at 47 Albemarle Street, London, Potter published Thoughts respecting the Origin of Treasonable Conspiracies. By then a professional writer, he produced Olivia, or the Nymph of the Valley, a two-volume novel, London, 1813. Jeremias David Reuss also assigned to Potter two undated works, A Journal of a Tour through parts of Germany, Holland, and France, and a Treatise on Pulmonary Inflammation, with The Repository, The Historical Register, and Polyhymnia. Baker wrote that he corrected and added to Thomas Salmon's General Gazetteer and John Ogilby's Book of Roads; and also indexed John Dryden's Virgil and other works.

== Notes ==
Attribution

This article incorporates text from a publication now in the public domain: Lee, Sidney, ed. (1896). "Potter, John (fl.1754-1804)". Dictionary of National Biography. Vol. 46. London: Smith, Elder & Co.
