= William Bagwell (writer) =

William Bagwell (fl. 1655) was a London merchant and writer on astronomy.

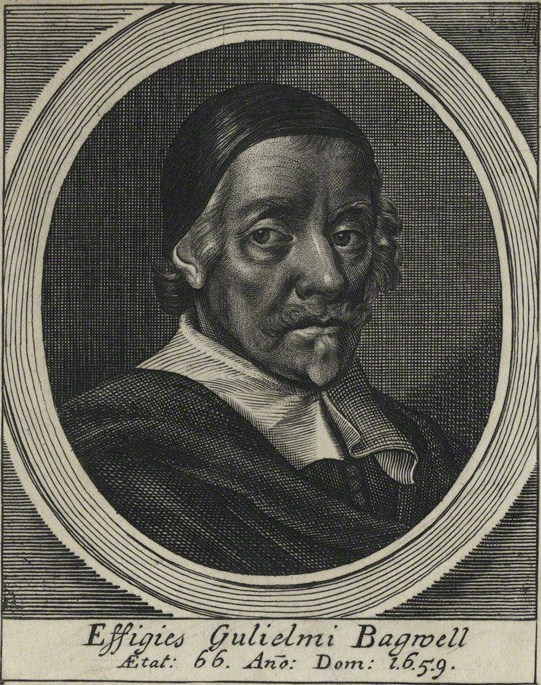
William Bagwell

== Life ==
The inscription on his portrait in 1659 gives his age as 66, so that he was probably born in 1593. According to his own account in The Mystery of Astronomy made Plain, he was a merchant, had travelled and traded widely; overseas losses led to his being sent to prison for debt. In 1654 he had been in and out of prison for twenty years. After being set at liberty in 1654 Bagwell was put by some friends in good employment.

== Works ==
In confinement Bagwell wrote an Arithmetical Description of the Celestial and Terrestrial Globes; the manuscript is in the British Library. In 1655 he published The Mystery of Astronomy made Plain, a simplification of his more elaborate treatise. Philip Bliss, in a note to Anthony Wood states that he dedicated his Sphinx Thebanus or Ingenious Riddle, 1664, to the physician Humphry Brook as patron.

In 1645 Bagwell had published The Distressed Merchant, and Prisoners Comfort in Distress, a piece of doggerel, which was caricatured in Wil Bagnal's Ghost, or the Merry Devill of Gadmunton in his Perambulations of the Prisons of London, by Edmund Gayton, 1655, and in Will Bagnalls Ballet, in Wit Restored, 1658. Bagwell also published another short poem, entitled An Affectionate Expostulation for the Pious Employment both of Wit and Wealth. In 1652 there was published, by order of Oliver Cromwell, A Full Discovery of a Foul Concealment, or a True Narrative of the Proceedings and Transactions of the Committee for the Accompts of the Commonwealth of England with William Bagwell and John Brockedon, accomptants, Discoverers and Plaintiff's against the Committee of Hartford, the Treasurer and Paymaster there in the year 1643; but this William Bagwell may be another person.
