= John Milton Potter =

American academic administrator (1906–1947)

President of Hobart and William Smith Colleges
- In office September 1, 1942 – January 9, 1947

Personal details
- Born: John Milton Chase Potter Jr. October 22, 1906 Idaho Springs, Colorado, U.S.
- Died: January 9, 1947 (aged 40) Geneva, New York, U.S.
- Education: Harvard University
- Occupation: Academic administrator

John Milton Chase Potter Jr. (October 22, 1906 – January 9, 1947) was an American academic administrator who served as the president of Hobart and William Smith Colleges.

== Biography ==
He was born on October 22, 1906, in Idaho Springs, Colorado, to John Milton Chase Potter Sr. and Camilla Parthenia Barber. He became president of Hobart and William Smith Colleges on September 1, 1942. He died on January 9, 1947, in Geneva, New York of a coronary occlusion.

He graduated from Harvard University.
