= Bill Potter (musician) =

American singer, actor, and television personality

- Potter, c. 1957

Background information
- Also known as: Cactus Bill; Cowboy Bill
- Born: Lewis William Potter; April 23, 1923; Stratton, Maine, U.S.
- Died: September 5, 1975 (aged 52) Orange, Texas, U.S.
- Genres: Country
- Occupations: Singer, actor, deputy sheriff
- Instrument: Guitar
- Years active: c. 1948–1957
- Labels: Starday Records; Monogram Pictures

Lewis William Potter (April 15, 1923 – September 5, 1975), known professionally as Bill Potter, was an American country music singer, Western movie actor, and television personality of the late 1940s and early 1950s.

== Biography ==
Potter grew up in Bingham, Maine, and served with the United States Army Air Forces during World War II. After being discharged in December 1943, he worked for a shipbuilding company in Orange, Texas. By 1948, he was married to a woman from Dallas and had a son. They later operated a ranch near Orange.

In Texas, Potter was discovered by a talent scout, and appeared in several Western movies by Monogram Pictures in the late 1940s as a singing cowboy. Also known as "Cactus Bill" or "Cowboy Bill", Potter went on to appear on early television shows on KFI-TV in Los Angeles and on KPRC-TV in Houston. While living in Houston, he worked as a deputy sheriff in Harris County for approximately three years. In mid-1954, he moved to Corpus Christi, Texas, where he had a children's program on KVDO-TV. He resumed working as a deputy sheriff in December 1955, a role he held through at least December 1956.

In August 1957, Potter was the winning contestant on an episode of Arthur Godfrey's Talent Scouts, singing a western ballad. Billed as "Hollywood Singing Cowboy Bill Potter", he was featured at several events in Maine the following month. From February to May 1958, KPLC-TV in Lake Charles, Louisiana, broadcast the Bill Potter Show on an intermittent basis. At the time of his mother's death in June 1958, Potter was again living in Orange, Texas.

Potter died in September 1975 in Orange, aged 52, "following a lingering illness." He was survived by a son and a daughter. He is interred in Houston National Cemetery.

== Filmography ==
Potter is known to have appeared in at least 10 movies, each released in 1948 or 1949:

Year	Title	Role
1948	Gunning for Justice	Potter
1948	Courtin' Trouble	Steve Graves
1948	Hidden Danger	Henchman Perry
1949	Susanna Pass	Henchman (uncredited)
1949	Across the Rio Grande	Pete - Henchman (uncredited)
1949	West of El Dorado	Guitar Player Phil
1949	Brand of Fear	Mac - Gold Shipper
1949	Range Justice	Bill (as Bill Porter)
1949	Haunted Trails	Deputy (uncredited)
1949	Western Renegades	Bob (uncredited)

== Discography ==
Potter is known to have released at least two records, both with Starday Records in 1953. Additionally, a promotional record from the Shamrock Record Company in Houston is credited to Cowboy Bill Potter and Dickie Jones and His Texas Longhorns, year unspecified.

Label	No.	A-side	B-Side	Format	Ref.
Starday	110	"I Lost My Gal"	"Nobody Knows"	Shellac / 10" / 78 rpm	
Starday	111	"Honk Your Horn"	"Cry Not For Me"	Vinyl / 7" / 45 rpm	
Shamrock	–	"High Sierra Moon"	"I Got A Yearnin'"	Shellac / 10" / 78 rpm	
