= Christopher Potter (author) =

British writer (born 1959)

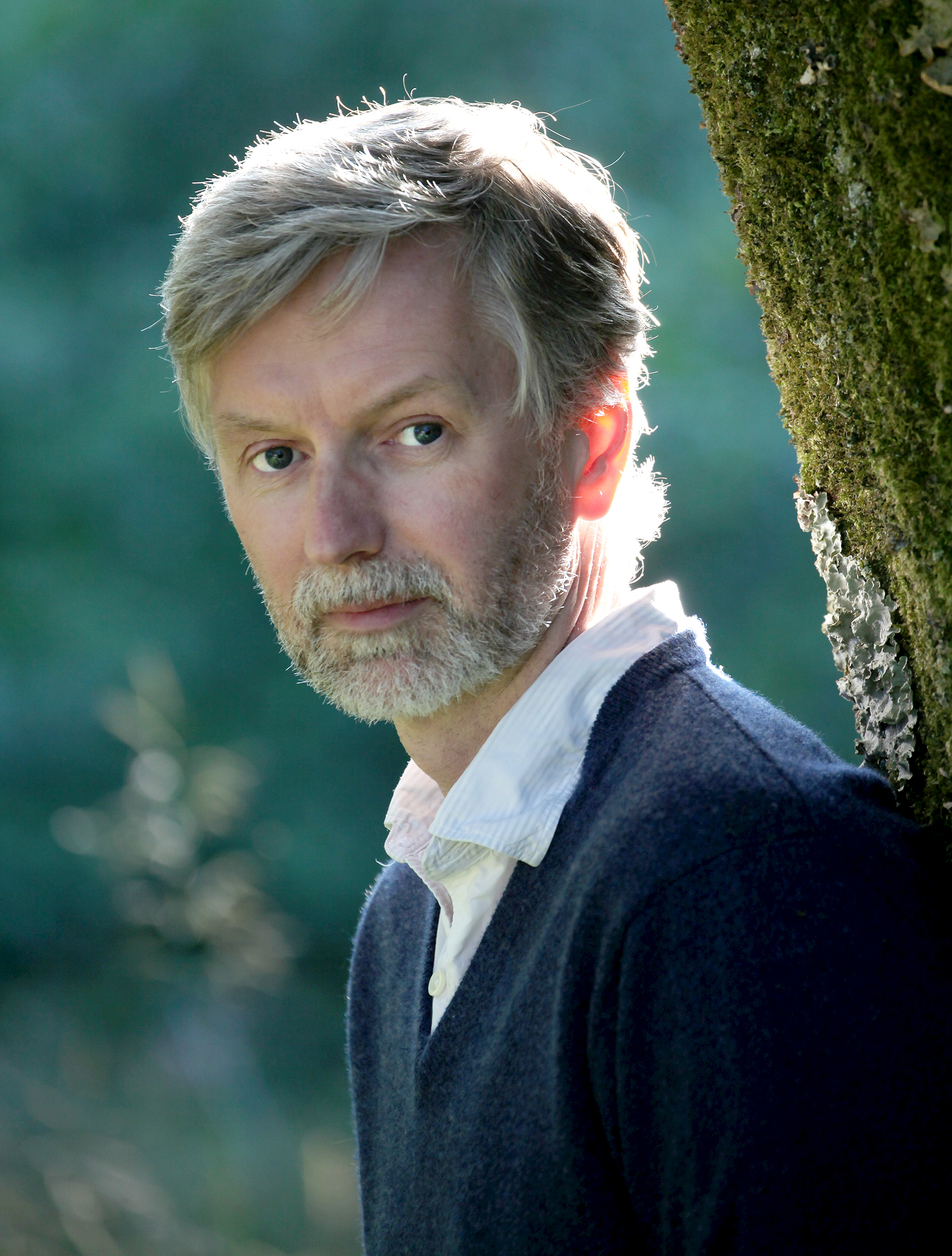
- Potter in Scotland
- Born: 1 April 1959 (age 66); Warrington, England
- Occupation: Writer, publisher, editor

Website
- christopherpotter.co.uk

Christopher Potter (born 1 April 1959) is a British author and editor.

== Life and career ==
Born in Warrington, Potter has a BSc in mathematics from King's College London and an MSc in the history and philosophy of science.

He was an editor for six years at Sphere Books before joining the independent publishing house Fourth Estate, where he ultimately became publisher and managing director. The company was celebrated for discovering so-called "sleepers" and transforming them into bestsellers.

At Fourth Estate he worked closely with many writers, including Carol Shields, Annie Proulx, Michael Cunningham and Michael Chabon (all of whom won the Pulitzer Prize for novels published by Fourth Estate), Dava Sobel, Hilary Mantel, Matt Ridley, Simon Singh, Salley Vickers, Ann Patchett, James Gleick, Kate Summerscale, Kathryn Harrison, Kate Jennings, Gilbert Adair, Maureen Duffy, Paul Hoffman, Paul Bailey, Deborah Cadbury, Mark Merlis, Rupert Shelldrake, Amanda Craig, Fernanda Eberstadt and Rachel Cusk."

In 2004, after 17 years at Fourth Estate, Potter left to pursue a career as a writer. In January 2019 he joined Europa Editions UK as editorial director.

== Books ==
His first book, You Are Here, was published in 2009 by Hutchinson (Random House) in the UK and HarperCollins in America. It was translated into 15 languages. "One of the best popular science books I have ever read," wrote Stuart Jeffries in the Guardian. The Sunday Times described it as "One of the most entertaining and thoughtful pop-science books to be published for years."

Potter's second book, How to Make a Human Being, was published in 2014 by Fourth Estate. "A sort of commonplace book full of paradox and conflicting ideas, shocking facts and redemptive anecdotes, turbulent with two or three millennia of human thought," wrote The Guardian.

His third book, The Earth Gazers, was published in 2018 by Head of Zeus in the UK and Pegasus in America. The Times described it as "A fresh and elegantly wrought account of mankind’s journey from firing lumps of jerry-rigged metal from cabbage fields to crunching around in the dust of another world."
