= Thomas Rossell Potter =

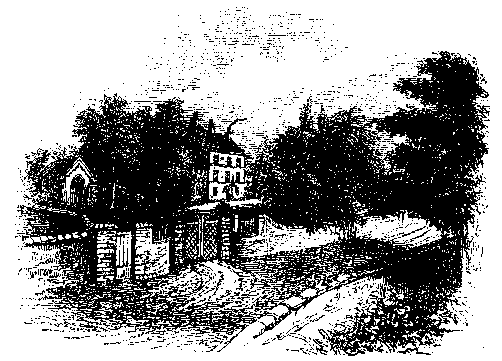
- The Hermitage in Wymeswold
- Born: 7 January 1799; West Hallam, Derbyshire
- Died: 19 April 1873 (aged 74); Wymeswold
- Education: Risley and Wirksworth grammar schools
- Occupations: Teacher and antiquary
- Spouse: Frances Fosbrooke of Shardlow
- Children: nine
- Parent(s): John and Mary (nee Rossell)

Thomas Rossell Potter (7 January 1799 – 19 April 1873) was a British antiquary. He started a school in Leicestershire, but he is known for his publications about the history and geology of Leicestershire. He was the editor of a number of local newspapers.

== Biography ==
Born at West Hallam, Derbyshire to John and Mary Potter, he went to Risley grammar school, and later to the grammar school at Wirksworth. When he was fifteen his parents removed to Wymeswold in Leicestershire, and there he resided until his death.

Potter's intention of entering the church was frustrated by his father's death, and Potter accordingly started a school on Elm Street in Wymeswold called "The Hermitage" (pictured). The school proved successful, and, with the exception of a few years devoted entirely to literary work, he spent the remainder of his days in tuition. The account below is taken from a schoolbook by Thomas Wamer Lacey which was rediscovered in a record office in 1999. He wrote:

"... I then came to Mr Potters of Wymeswould, he is a very kind master, and Mrs Potter is a kind mistress, and was like a mother to us all, and will always be remembered by us. Mr Potter takes us a fishing, and bathing, and we have delightful walks, a pleasant playground, pretty little gardens, rabbithouses, &c. furnish amusements for us in the Summer evenings. In Winter we have a Library of Books to run to, a magic lantern to amuse us, and many a long hour do we spend in listening to Mr P~s tales round the cheerful fire..."

A notable student of his was the antiquarian John Joseph Briggs.

Potter had developed a taste for literature, and especially for antiquities and geology. In 1841/42, he temporarily removed from Wymeswold to a house in Charnwood Forest, and while there he collected notes about the history, antiquities, natural history, and geology of the area. This became The History and Antiquities of Charnwood Forest.

Potter attempted a reissue of the History of Leicestershire by John Nichols, but his effort proved abortive, and, though much was written, only the Physical Geography and Geology of Leicestershire was printed (in 1866).

Potter was fond of field sports, was a regular attender at meets of the Quorn Hunt, and contributed a series of papers and poems for the Sporting Magazine from 1827 until 1840, under the pseudonym of Old Grey. He afterwards wrote for the Sporting Review. He became editor of the Leicester Advertiser in 1849, of the Ilkeston Pioneer in 1856, and of the Leicester Guardian in 1858. In 1865, he was editor of the Loughborough Monitor (later the Loughborough Monitor and News).

Potter married, on 14 January 1836, Frances Sarah Fosbrooke of Shardlow Hall, Derbyshire. They had five sons (Henry Rossell, Edmund Fosbrooke, Charles Neville, Herbert Edward and Arthur Evelyn) and four daughters (Fanny Elizabeth, Mary Constance, Ada Mary and Frances Sibella). Potter predeceased his wife, dying in Wymeswold.

Besides the works mentioned, he published:

1. Walks round Loughborough, 1840.
2. The Genius of Nottinghamshire, 1849.
3. Rambles round Loughborough, reprinted from The Loughborough News, 1868.
4. Poems, 1881
