= Bert Potter (composer) =

Albert Lincoln "Bert" Potter (March 11, 1874 – January 29, 1930) was a composer of popular songs active between 1904 and 1917.

== Biography ==
Bert Potter, born in Boston, was the first child of Algernon S. and Flora E. Potter. Algernon was a wholesale dealer in clothing, and Bert was raised in an upper-middle-class family, with two Irish servants in the household. After his marriage to Eleanor Dodge (August 2, 1898), Bert worked in his father's business; but early in the twentieth century he migrated into music, publishing his first songs in 1904. Shortly afterwards he settled in Dorchester, in a house that he occupied the rest of his life. The 1908 city directory identified him as a "musician", and at least from 1910 to 1914 he worked as a salesman in piano stores. By 1918, however, he had abandoned the musical profession and become an agent with John Hancock Mutual Insurance Co., serving in that capacity until his death.

== Composer ==
Between 1904 and 1907 eighteen publications by Potter were copyrighted; in 1912 there were two more, and in 1917 a single, final one. He wrote piano pieces and songs, the latter usually to his own texts. Most pieces are uptempo rags, marches, and novelties; at least one piano solo, "A Swell Affair" (1906), is considered a minor classic and has been included in recent ragtime anthologies. Several early songs were intended for blackface performance in vaudeville or revues. Potter had a lively, if conventional, sense of rhythm; this, plus a certain lack of melodic invention, made his instrumental music generally more popular than his songs. Several compositions were released in band arrangements, notably by the publisher Walter Jacobs; all Potter's music was issued by Boston firms.

On December 10, 1917, D. W. Cooper copyrighted Potter's "101st Regiment, U.S.A. March", an isolated piece written after Potter had left the musical profession. This was moderately popular, at least in Boston. In a six-month period it was issued twice (the same music, but newly engraved), its Trio was published as one of the "War Songs" musical supplements in the Boston Sunday Advertiser, and it was released on a piano roll for coin-operated players. The 101st regiment, known as "Boston's Own", formed part of the celebrated "Yankee Division" (the 26th), which was the first army unit to be dispatched to the front after America entered World War I. Potter was surely moved by civic pride to write this march, but he had personal motivations as well: his son Albert N. Potter had enlisted on July 7, 1917, and was listed among the wounded at war's end.
