= Michael Cressé Potter =

English botanist (1858–1948)

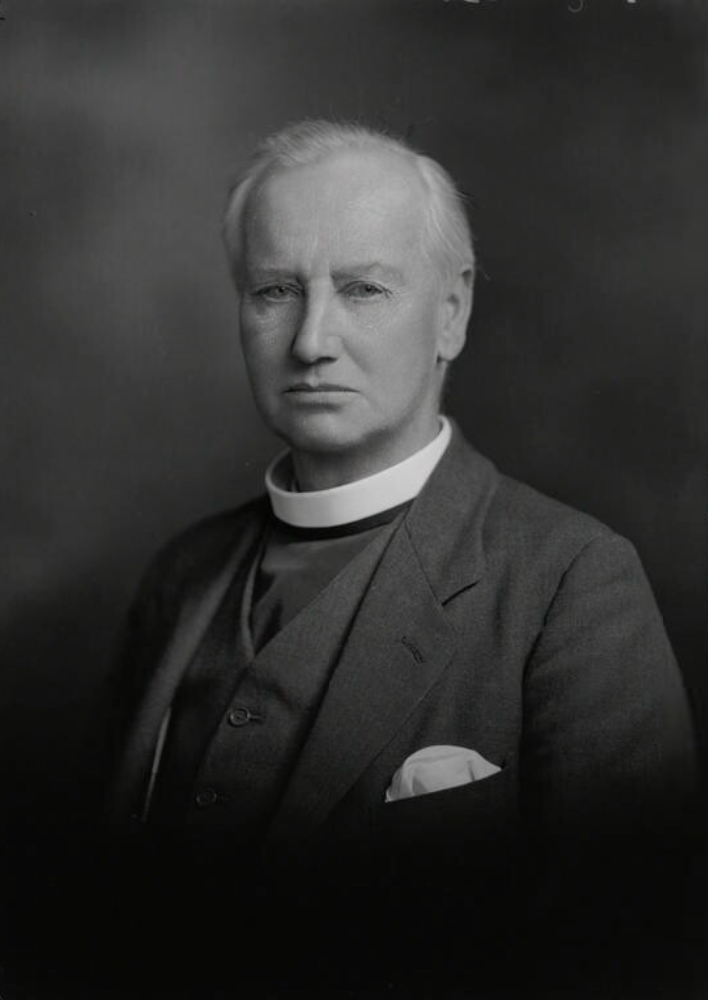
Michael Cressé Potter

Michael Cressé Potter FLS (7 September 1858, in Corley, Warwickshire – 9 March 1948, in New Milton, Hampshire) was an English botanist, mycologist, phytopathologist, herbarium curator, and canon in the Church of England. He was the president of the British Mycological Society in 1909.

== Biography ==
He was christened on 7 November 1858 in Bulkington, Warwickshire. After education at St Edward's School, Oxford and The Perse School, Potter matriculated at in 1877 at Peterhouse, Cambridge. He graduated from the University of Cambridge with a B.A. in 1881, an M.A. in 1884, and a Sc.D. in 1909. As the successor to Thomas Hughes Corry, Potter was from 1884 to 1889 the assistant curator of the University of Cambridge's herbarium, under the supervision of C. C. Babington. Potter worked as an assistant to Walter Gardiner in re-establishing the University of Cambridge's botanical museum founded by John Stevens Henslow. At Cambridge, Potter gave long-vacation lectures in which he emphasized 2 scientific trends: (1) what was then known as the "new botany", introduced by William Ramsay McNab at Dublin and by Thomas Henry Huxley and William Thiselton-Dyer at South Kensington, and (2) practical laboratory botanical investigation being developed at Cambridge under the direction of the reader, Sydney Howard Vines. From 1883 to 1889 Potter was a lecturer in the botany department of the University of Cambridge.

Potter was a Worts Traveling Scholar (provided by the Worts Travelling Fund of the University of Cambridge) for botanical research in Portugal in 1886 and a Worts Travelling Scholar for the study of a tropical flora in Ceylon in 1888–1889. In 1889 he was appointed to a lectureship in the department of botany of Armstrong College (which is now a part of Newcastle University) in Newcastle upon Tyne. In September 1891 in Northumberland he married Norah Helen Silburn. In 1892 Armstrong College introduced a professorial chair of botany and Potter was the first holder of the chair. He emphasized experimental physiology in botany. During his professorship he gave evening classes for farmers and gardeners. In 1899 he discovered that a Pseudomonas pathovar causes white-rot of turnips.

In 1887 Potter went to Heidelberg, where he attended Ernst Hugo Heinrich Pfitzer's lectures and thus became familiar with the Continental system of botanical classification. Potter used this taxonomic system in his lectures on systematic botany. In 1894 he was the translator and editor for the 3rd Danish edition of Eugenius Warming's Handbog i den Systematiske Botanik. This translation introduces the Continental system of botanical taxonomy to English-speaking botanists. The first edition of the translation A Handbook of Systematic Botany was published in March 1894 with a second edition in July 1894. In 1909 Potter gave the British Mycological Society's presidential address entitled Bacteria in their relation to plant pathology.

During WW I, Potter was a volunteer in a Newcastle signaling unit, created for home defence. He also took Holy Orders in the Church of England to relieve younger clergymen whose ranks had been depleted by the demands of the British Armed Forces. In Newcastle upon Tyne he was ordained a deacon in 1918 and a priest in 1919. From 1918 to 1925 he was canon of St George's, Newcastle-on-Tyne. From 1940 to 1948 he had permission to officiate in the diocese of Winchester. He pursued campanology as a hobby.

Potter retired from his professorship of botany in 1925. By the time of his retirement, the department of botany, headed and developed by him, employed four lecturers and there were 167 students of science, agriculture, or medicine attending courses in the department.

On 4 December 1884 he was elected a fellow of the Linnean Society of London. His botanical specimens are stored at the University of Cambridge and at the National Museum of Wales.

== Selected publications ==
=== Articles ===
- Potter, M.C. (1887). "Note on an alga (Dermatophyton radicans, Peter) growing on the European tortoise". Botanical Journal of the Linnean Society. 24 (161): 251–254. doi:10.1111/j.1095-8339.1887.tb01327.x.
- —— (1889). "On the structure of the thallus of Delesseria sanguinea" (PDF). Journal of the Marine Biological Association of the United Kingdom. 1 (2): 171–172. Bibcode:1889JMBUK...1..171P. doi:10.1017/S0025315400058008. S2CID 59574129.
- —— (1891). "Observations on the Protection of Buds in the Tropics". Journal of the Linnean Society of London, Botany. 28 (195): 343–352. doi:10.1111/j.1095-8339.1891.tb01466.x.
- —— (1896). "Note on "Plasmodiophora brassicæ"". Nature. 55 (1411): 33. Bibcode:1896Natur..55S..33P. doi:10.1038/055033d0. S2CID 4006580.
- —— (1901). "On a bacterial disease of the turnip ( Brassica napus )". Proceedings of the Royal Society of London. 67 (435–441): 442–459. doi:10.1098/rspl.1900.0050. S2CID 84690508.
- —— (1902). On a Canker of the Oak (Quercus robur).
- —— (1904). "On the Occurrence of Cellulose in the Xylem of Woody Stems". Annals of Botany. 18 (69): 121–140. doi:10.1093/oxfordjournals.aob.a088947. JSTOR 43235561.
- —— (1908). "Bacteria as agents in the oxidation of amorphous carbon". Proceedings of the Royal Society of London. Series B, Containing Papers of a Biological Character. 80 (539): 239–259. doi:10.1098/rspb.1908.0023. S2CID 95370841.
- —— (1911). "Electrical effects accompanying the decomposition of organic compounds". Proceedings of the Royal Society of London. Series B, Containing Papers of a Biological Character. 84 (571): 260–276. doi:10.1098/rspb.1911.0073.
- —— (1915). "Electrical effects accompanying the decomposition of organic compounds. II.- Ionisation of the gases produced during fermentation". Proceedings of the Royal Society of London. Series A, Containing Papers of a Mathematical and Physical Character. 91 (632): 465–480. Bibcode:1915RSPSA..91..465P. doi:10.1098/rspa.1915.0038. S2CID 93034256.
- —— (1921). "British Plants Available as a Source of Industrial Alcohol". Nature. 107 (2684): 170–171. Bibcode:1921Natur.107..170P. doi:10.1038/107170c0. S2CID 4067253.
- —— (1923). "Wart disease of the potato". Transactions of the British Mycological Society. 8 (4): 247–249. doi:10.1016/S0007-1536(23)80033-X.
- —— (1930). "Hydrion Concentration of Rain and Potable Water". Nature. 126 (3177): 434–435. Bibcode:1930Natur.126..434P. doi:10.1038/126434c0. S2CID 4141109.
- —— (1931). "Measurement of the Electricity Liberated during the Downgrade Reactions of Organic Compounds". Nature. 127 (3206): 554–555. Bibcode:1931Natur.127..554P. doi:10.1038/127554a0. S2CID 4176187.

=== Books ===
- Potter, Michael Cresse (1893). An Elementary Text-book of Agricultural Botany.
