= Michael Potter (immunologist) =

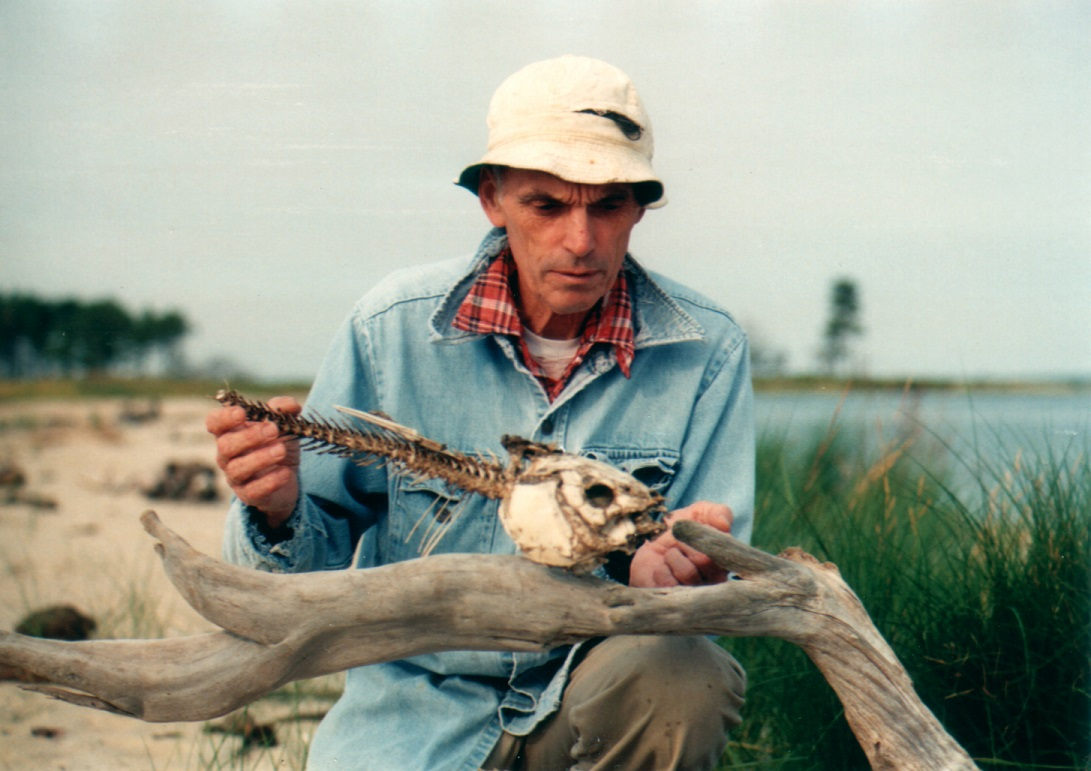
Dr. Potter in 2004

Michael Potter (February 27, 1924 – June 18, 2013) was an American physician and immunologist. He won the Paul Ehrlich and Ludwig Darmstaedter Prize for outstanding contributions to medical research in 1983, and the Albert Lasker Award for Basic Medical Research in 1984, for "his fundamental research in the genetics of immunoglobulin molecules and for paving the way for the development of hybridomas and monoclonal antibodies".

Potter was born February 27, 1924, in East Orange, New Jersey to Thomas Potter, a lawyer, and Mavis Potter. He did not enter school until the 4th grade. Potter was elected to the National Academy of Sciences in 1981.

Potter attended Princeton University for his undergraduates study, graduating in 1945. He received his medical degree from the University of Virginia in 1949. He did his residency at UVA, and was drafted into the war as an army officer in 1951.

In 1954, he joined the National Cancer Institute, where he became an expert in plasma cell cancers, and was involved in the early characterization of the structure and function of antibodies. He worked at NCI for nearly sixty years, serving as a section chief in the Laboratory of Cell Biology, as a branch chief in the Laboratory of Genetics from 1982 to 2003, and as a senior investigator from 2003 until his retirement.

Potter met his wife Jeanne Ann Phalen, a nursing student at the University of Virginia. They had two children; Michael and Melissa.
