= William C. Potter =

American academic

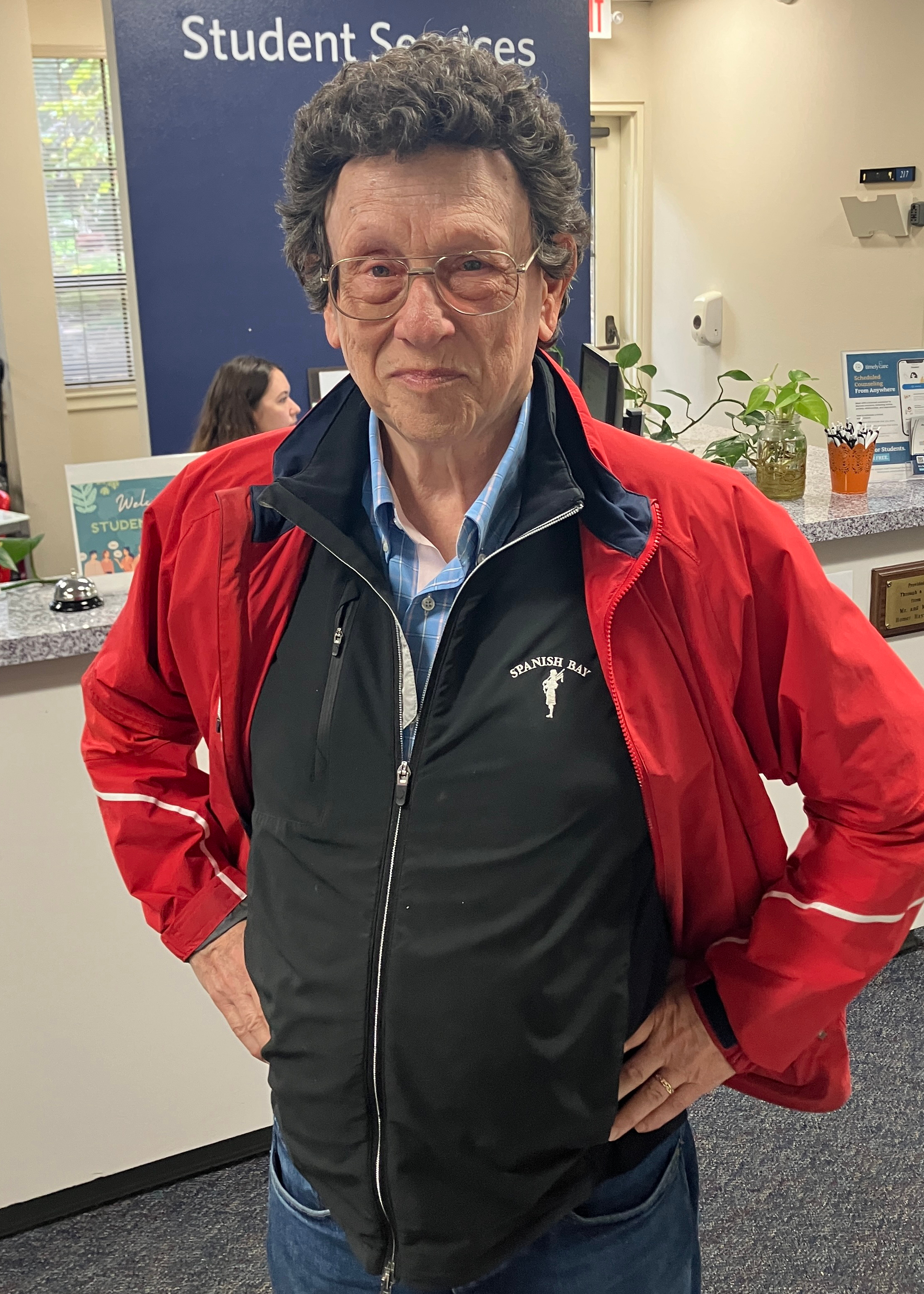
Bill Potter.

William C. "Bill" Potter is Sam Nunn and Richard Lugar Professor of Nonproliferation Studies and Founding Director of the James Martin Center for Nonproliferation Studies (CNS) at the Middlebury Institute of International Studies at Monterey (MIIS). He previously directed the MIIS Center for Russian and Eurasian Studies and, before the establishment of CNS, was the MIIS director for Soviet affairs.

Dr. Potter is the author, editor, or co-editor of over 20 books and has authored more than 125 articles and book chapters, including in Arms Control Today, Bulletin of the Atomic Scientists, Foreign Affairs, Foreign Policy, International Organization, International Security, Journal of Conflict Resolution, Problems of Communism, Slavic Review, Survival, and the Washington Quarterly. He has served as a consultant to several organizations, including the Arms Control and Disarmament Agency, Lawrence Livermore National Laboratory, the RAND Corporation, and the Jet Propulsion Laboratory. He has been a member of several committees of the National Academy of Sciences and currently serves on the National Academy of Sciences Nonproliferation Panel.

His present research focuses on nuclear terrorism and proliferation issues involving the post-Soviet states. He is a member of the Council on Foreign Relations and the Pacific Council on International Policy, and served for five years on the United Nations' Secretary-General's Advisory Board on Disarmament Matters and the Board of Trustees of the UN Institute for Disarmament Research. He currently serves on the International Advisory Board of the Center for Policy Studies in Russia (Moscow). He was an advisor to the delegation of Kyrgyzstan to the 1995 NPT Review and Extension Conference and to the 1997, 1998, 1999, 2002, 2003, 2004 and 2007 sessions of the NPT Preparatory Committee, as well as to the 2000 and 2005 NPT Review Conferences. Dr. Potter has also participated as a delegate at every NPT Review Conference and Preparatory Committee meeting since 1995.

In 2019, Dr. Potter was elected as a Foreign Member to the Russian Academy of Sciences. Dr. Potter is one of a limited number of non-Russian nationals honored by the Academy, and only the second American—after Henry Kissinger in 2016—ever elected to the RAS Global Issues and International Relations Section.

== Works ==
- (ed.) Verification and SALT: The Challenge of Strategic Deception (1980)
- Nuclear Power and Nonproliferation: An Interdisciplinary Perspective (1982)
- (co-edited) Soviet Decisionmaking for National Security (1984)
- (ed.) Verification and Arms Control (1985)
- (co-edited) The Nuclear Suppliers and Nonproliferation (1985)
- (co-edited) Continuity and Change in Soviet-East European Relations (1989)
- Soviet Decisionmaking for Chernobyl: An Analysis of System Performance and Policy Change (1990)
- (ed.) International Nuclear Trade and Nonproliferation (1990)
- Nuclear Profiles of the Soviet Successor States (1993)
- (co-edited) International Missile Bazaar: The New Suppliers' Network (1994)
- (co-edited) Dismantling the Cold War: U.S. and NIS Perspectives on the Nunn-Lugar Cooperative Threat Reduction Program (1997)
- (co-edited) Dangerous Weapons, Desperate States (1999)
- Tactical Nuclear Weapons: Options for Control (2000)
- (as co-author) The Four Faces of Nuclear Terrorism (2005)
- (co-edited) Engaging China and Russia on Nuclear Disarmament (2009)
- (co-edited) The Global Politics of Combating Nuclear Terrorism: A Supply Side Approach (2009)
- (co-edited) Forecasting Nuclear Nonproliferation in the 21st Century (2 volumes, 2010)
- (co-edited) The Global Politics of Combating Nuclear Terrorism (2010)
- Nuclear Politics and the Non-Aligned Movement: Principles vs Pragmatism (2012)
- (co-edited) Preventing Black-Market Trade in Nuclear Technology (2018)
- (co-edited) Once and Future Partners: The United States, Russia, and Nuclear Non-Proliferation (2018)
