= Thomas J. Potter =

American railroad executive (1840–1888)

- Born: August 16, 1840; Carroll County, Ohio, U.S.
- Died: March 9, 1888 (aged 47); Washington, D.C., U.S.
- Resting place: Ottumwa Cemetery; Ottumwa, Iowa, U.S.
- Occupation: Railroad executive
- Employer: Union Pacific Railroad
- Spouse: Urdillia Jane Wood (m. 1863)
- Military career
- Allegiance: United States
- Branch: Union Army
- Service years: 1863–1866
- Rank: Captain
- Unit: 7th Iowa Cavalry Regiment
- Conflicts: American Civil War

Thomas J. Potter (August 16, 1840 – March 9, 1888) was vice-president and general manager of the Union Pacific Railroad.

== Early life ==
Thomas J. Potter was born on August 16, 1840, in Carroll County, Ohio. He grew up on a farm. In 1853, he moved with his parents to Ottumwa, Iowa as they engaged in a hotel business.

== Career ==
In 1862, Potter worked with a surveying party to lay out the Burlington and Missouri River Railroad from Ottumwa to Council Bluffs, Iowa. Potter enlisted in 7th Iowa Cavalry Regiment as a private during the American Civil War in January 1863. He rose to the rank of captain and was honorably discharged in 1866.

Potter became a station agent for the Burlington and Missouri River Railroad in Albia, Iowa in 1867. He was promoted to the office of chief clerk in the roadmaster's department after he gained the approval of Superintendent Charles Elliott Perkins. Potter was offered a better position in 1873 with the Chicago, Burlington and Quincy Railroad. With the latter firm he rose from assistant superintendent, to general manager, and then vice-president in 1884.Potter also served as vice president of the St. Louis and Keokuk Railroad, the Chicago, Burlington and Kansas City Railroad, the Chicago and Iowa Railroad, the Hannibal and St. Joseph Railroad, and the Burlington and Missouri River Railroad.

In 1887, Union Pacific President Charles Francis Adams Jr. offered the job of vice president and general manager of the Union Pacific Railroad to Potter. Potter accepted the role.

== Personal life ==
Briefly furloughed during the war, Potter married Urdillia Jane Wood of Ottumwa on May 21, 1863.

He died an untimely death at the age of 48. His remains were transported west on the Pennsylvania Railroad after he died at Welcker's Hotel in Washington, D.C., on March 9, 1888. Potter was buried in Ottumwa Cemetery.

A memorial arch was erected in his honor at Aspen Grove Cemetery by his wife around 1906.
