= Scarborough Cricket Club (England) =

English amateur cricket club

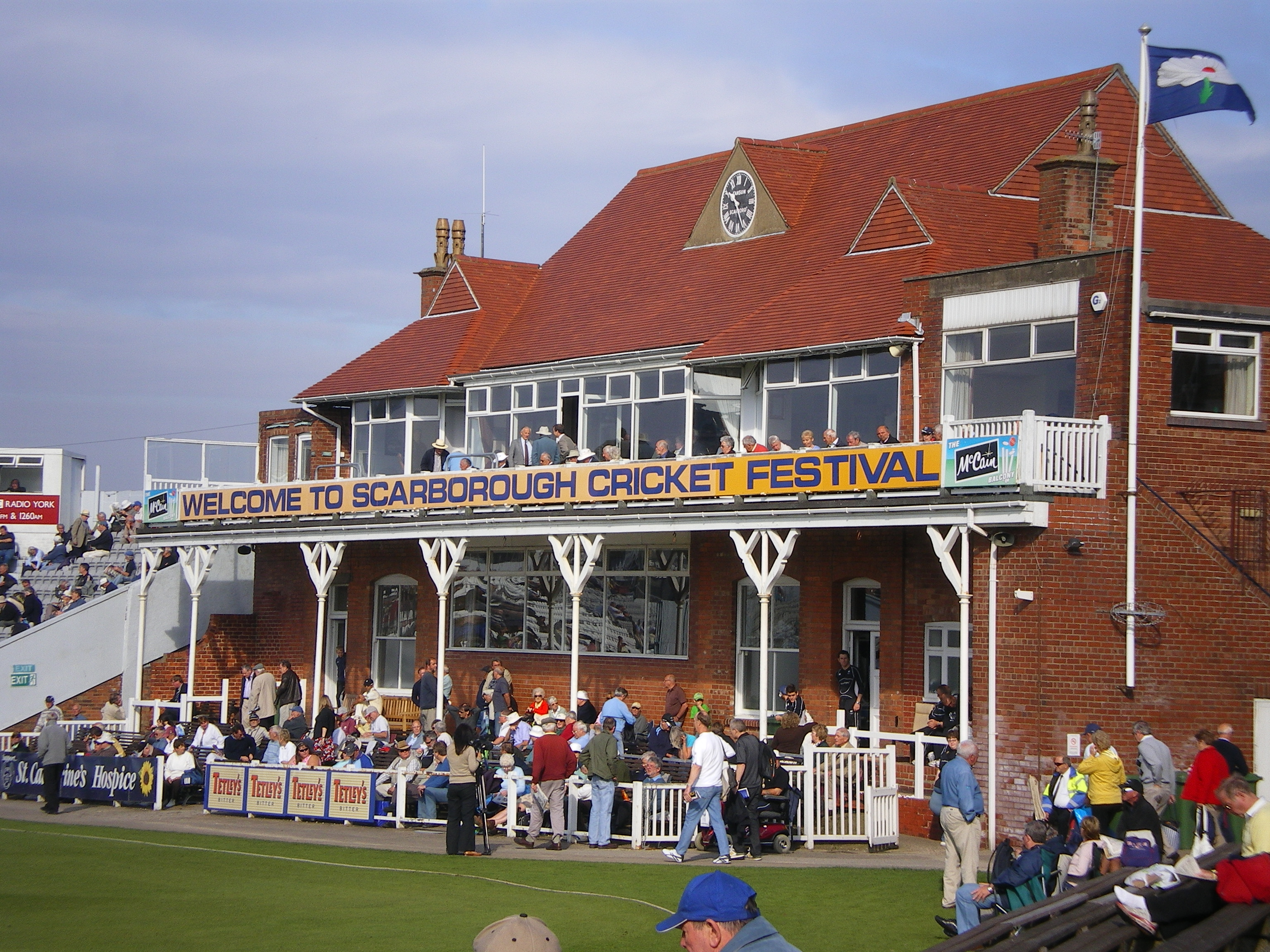
- North Marine Road pavilion

Team information
- Founded: 1849
- Home ground: North Marine Road Ground
- Official website: Scarborough Cricket Club

Scarborough Cricket Club is an English amateur cricket club, based in Scarborough, North Yorkshire. The club was founded in 1849, and is a member of the Yorkshire Premier League North.

== Ground ==
The North Marine Road is a 11,500-capacity ground in Scarborough and the base for Scarborough Cricket Club. The two 'ends' are known as the Peasholm Park End and the Trafalgar Square End. First established in 1863, Scarborough Cricket Club's North Marine Road Ground held a record 22,946 people who watched Yorkshire play Derbyshire in 1947, back in the days when it was known as The Queen's Cricket Ground. North Marine Road includes 2 grass practice nets and 5 all-weather net facilities. The ground and its buildings were refurbished the year it was named as The Guardian's ground of the year in 2011.

== History ==
The Club was originally formed in 1849 in a meeting held in The Queen Hotel (later to become The Cricketers Pub and now Retirement apartments) on North Marine Road. The early matches were played on rough land opposite the Queen Hotel, the first match being in September 1849 against Filey. As the Club developed, important matches were played at Castle Hill on a ground prepared at the direction of the Army for the local Rifle Volunteers. Often, the practice of the Riflemen conflicted with matches and eventually this became a contributing factor for developing the ground opposite the Queen Hotel. A match was organised in 1862 for a Scarborough Twenty (players) against an All England XI at Castle Hill, it proved to be a success with large crowds attending, and as a result it became an annual event, and the Club was reconstituted the following year. Lord Derwent was appointed President. The Pavilion was built in 1896 and at around the same time the covered seating at the Trafalgar Square End (the Enclosure) was built, as was the seating on the Popular Bank. The concrete North Stand was added in 1926 and the West Stand was erected in 1956 replacing a long low building which had been known as the Cow Sheds. Scarborough entered the National Club Knock-Out Competition in 1972 and progressed all the way to Lord's to meet Brentham Cricket Club in the Final. The Trophy was brought back to Scarborough in style with a six wicket win. In the seven years of the Haig Trophy (as it then became known), Scarborough were winners on four occasions: 1976, 1979 1981 and 1982. Scarborough Cricket Club's five wins remains unsurpassed in the ECB National Club Cricket Championship. Major rebuilding of the pavilion, tea rooms, new toilets and a new club shop opened on North Marine Road in time for the 2012 season.

The club's 1st XI senior team compete in the Yorkshire Premier League North, their 2nd XI senior team compete in the York & District Senior Cricket League the 3rd XI play in the Scarborough Beckett Cricket League, there's a Senior team in the Scarborough and District Evening Cricket League, and they have a junior training section that play competitive cricket in the Derwent Valley Junior Cricket League.

== Club Performance ==
The Yorkshire Premier League North competition results showing the club's positions in the league (by Division) since 2016.

Note: Solly Sports Yorkshire ECB County Premier League was dispanded after the 2015 season, and the 1st XI team moved to the new Yorkshire Premier League North the following year.

Key
| Gold | Champions |
| Red | Relegated |

cont...
| P | ECB Premier League |
| CE | Championship East |
| 1 | Division 1 |
| 2 | Division 2 |
| 3 | Division 3, etc. |

Yorkshire Premier League North
| Team | 2016 | 2017 | 2018 | 2019 | 2020 | 2021 | 2022 | 2023 | 2024 | 2025 | 2026 |
|---|---|---|---|---|---|---|---|---|---|---|---|
| 1st XI | P | P | P | P | | P | P | P | P | CE | CE |

York & District Senior Cricket League
| Team | 2009 | 2010 | 2011 | 2012 | 2013 | 2014 | 2015 | 2016 | 2017 | 2018 | 2019 | 2020 | 2021 | 2022 | 2023 | 2024 | 2025 | 2026 |
|---|---|---|---|---|---|---|---|---|---|---|---|---|---|---|---|---|---|---|
| 2nd XI | 2 | 3 | 3 | 3 | 3 | 3S | 3S | 2E | 2E | 2E | 2G | | 1E | 1E | 1E | 1E | 4B | 3B |

The following table shows the club's league positions by division in the Scarborough Beckett Cricket League from 2010 until the league's amalgamation with the Yorkshire Premier League North at the end of the 2024 season.

Scarborough Beckett Cricket League
| Team | 2010 | 2011 | 2012 | 2013 | 2014 | 2015 | 2016 | 2017 | 2018 | 2019 | 2020 | 2021 | 2022 | 2023 | 2024 |
|---|---|---|---|---|---|---|---|---|---|---|---|---|---|---|---|
| 3rd XI | C | C | C | B | B | B | 2 | 2 | 4E | | | 4 | 4 | 5 | 5 |

== Club Honours ==
Cup and trophy wins
| Cup/competition | Year(s) |
|---|---|
| ECB National Club Cricket Championship DH Robins Cup | 1972 |
| ECB National Club Cricket Championship John Haig Trophy | 1976, 1979, 1981, 1982 |
| Yorkshire League Cup Knock-Out Competition | 1983, 1984, 1993, 1994, 2007 |
| East Yorkshire Cricket Cup Competition | 1929, 1930, 1931, 1937, 1938, 1951, 1953, 1955, 1956, 1957, 1962, 1973, 1986, 1995 |
| East Yorkshire Cup Knock-Out Competition | 1992, 1994 |
| Ridings League Cup Knock-Out Competition | 1998 |
| Marshall Development Cup | 1992 |
| Wrigley Trophy (Indoor 6-a-side) | 1997 |

League champions
| League | Year(s) |
|---|---|
| Yorkshire League | 1957, 1959, 1960, 1964, 1966, 1969, 1971, 1973, 1976, 1978, 1980, 1981, 1984 |
| Yorkshire Council League | 1937, 1939, 1953, 1957 |
| Ridings League | 1986, 1989, 1996 |

Division champions
| League | Division | Year |
|---|---|---|
| York & District Senior Cricket League | Division 2 | 2019 (Note: Division 2(Galtres).) |
| Scarborough Beckett Cricket League | Division C | 2012 |
| Scarborough Beckett Cricket League | Division D | 2003 |
| Derwent Valley Cricket League | Division A | 2002 |
| Derwent Valley Cricket League | Division B | 1999 |
| Derwent Valley Cricket League | Division C | 1997 |

== Notable players ==
Some notable players for Scarborough CC have included:

- Brian Close
- Simon Dennis
- Malcolm Heath
- Ted Lester
- Bill Foord
- Piet Rinke
- Bryan Young
- Adam Lyth
- David Byas
- Clint Heron
- Richard Ngarava
- Philip Hart
- George Herbert Hirst
- David Hunter
- John Tunnicliffe
- Vic Wilson
- Christopher Clifford
- Craig White

== See also ==
- Club cricket
