= Yorkshire League =

Yorkshire League may refer to

- The RFL Yorkshire League, one of the rugby league county leagues which ran between 1895 and 1970 as the premier rugby league competitions in the United Kingdom
- The CMS Yorkshire league, an amateur rugby league competition in the United Kingdom
- The Yorkshire Football League, which became part of the Northern Counties (East) League in 1982
- Yorkshire League, a former cricket competition played for by clubs in Yorkshire, which is now split between the Yorkshire Premier League North and Yorkshire South Premier League.
