= Chris Ashling =

English cricketer and coach

Personal information
- Full name: Christopher Paul Ashling
- Born: 26 November 1988 (age 37); Manchester, England
- Batting: Right-handed
- Bowling: Right-arm medium-fast
- Role: Bowler

Domestic team information
- Years: Team
- 2009–2012: Glamorgan (squad no. 32)
- First-class debut: 2 September 2009 Glamorgan v Leicestershire
- List A debut: 6 September 2009 Glamorgan v Leicestershire

Career statistics
| Competition | FC | LA | T20 |
|---|---|---|---|
| Matches | 6 | 8 | 4 |
| Runs scored | 58 | 11 | 6 |
| Batting average | 11.60 | 5.50 | 3.00 |
| 100s/50s | 0/0 | 0/0 | 0/0 |
| Top score | 20 | 6* | 6 |
| Balls bowled | 763 | 274 | 66 |
| Wickets | 15 | 5 | 3 |
| Bowling average | 33.26 | 60.80 | 39.33 |
| 5 wickets in innings | 0 | 0 | 0 |
| 10 wickets in match | 0 | – | – |
| Best bowling | 4/47 | 2/33 | 2/39 |
| Catches/stumpings | 0/– | 0/– | 0/– |
- Source: CricketArchive, 24 March 2013

Christopher Paul Ashling (born 26 November 1988) is an English cricketer who coaches for the Cheshire Cricket Board following his release from Glamorgan. Born in Manchester, he is a right-handed batsman and bowls right-arm medium-fast.

Ashling began his cricket career with Bowdon Cricket Club and began playing for their first-team in the Cheshire County Cricket League as a 15-year-old in 2004, when they won the league for the fourth time in five years. He also played for the Cheshire Under-15s side and, on 17 August 2004, he was selected to play for the Lancashire Second XI against Essex Seconds. The following year, he progressed to the Cheshire Under-17s side while continuing to play for Lancashire Seconds until 2007, when he began attending UWIC in Cardiff and joined the Glamorgan academy. He made his first appearance for the Glamorgan Second XI on 5 September 2007 against Middlesex Seconds. In 2008, he ceased playing for Bowdon and instead played his club cricket for Sudbrook Cricket Club in Monmouthshire.

Ashling made his Minor Counties Championship for Wales Minor Counties against Dorset on 26 May 2008. He played for Wales Minor Counties and Glamorgan Seconds throughout the 2008 and 2009 seasons, before making his first-class debut for Glamorgan away to Leicestershire in the County Championship on 2 September 2009; he took three wickets and scored 12 runs in a drawn match. He also made his List A debut against Leicestershire on 6 September; he took one wicket and scored six runs, but Glamorgan lost by 23 runs. He made two more Pro40 appearances in 2009, before continuing in the side in 2010.

Ashling was released by Glamorgan at the end of the 2012 season. Unable to find a new home with a first-class county, Ashling returned to his former club, Bowdon CC, and took up a coaching position with the Cheshire Cricket Board.
