= Shaw Lane (cricket ground) =

Cricket ground in Barnsley, England

Coordinates: 53°32′56″N 1°29′42″W

Shaw Lane Cricket Ground
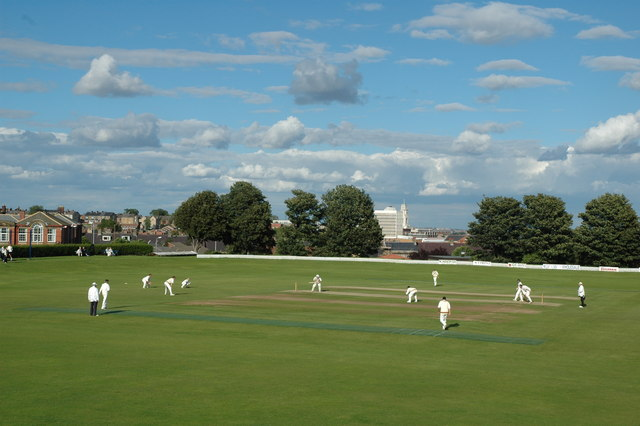
- Shaw Lane Cricket Ground
- Interactive map of Shaw Lane Cricket Ground

Ground information
- Location: Barnsley
- Country: England
- Establishment: 1862 (first recorded match)

International information
- Only women's ODI: 17 July 2010: England v New Zealand

Team information
| Yorkshire County Cricket Club | (1975-1978) |
- As of 6 September 2020; Source: Ground profile

Shaw Lane is a cricket ground in Barnsley. It hosted one first-class match, in August 1862 between Yorkshire and an All England XI, a game won by the England XI despite being bowled out for just 47 in their first innings.

More recently, it hosted four Benson and Hedges Cup one day matches featuring Yorkshire County Cricket Club between 1975 and 1978. Yorkshire beat Nottinghamshire CCC in 1975 but suffered one of their worst defeats when they lost by seven wickets to the Combined Universities the following year. The combined team did feature such future test players as Paul Parker, Vic Marks and Chris Tavare as well as Peter Roebuck. Yorkshire beat Essex CCC there in 1977 then lost to Surrey CCC by just one wicket in the last list A game held at the venue.

In 2010, it was the location for a Women's ODI, the 4th ODI between England Women and New Zealand Women, which England Women won by 9 wickets.

It has also hosted several Second XI and Minor Counties matches, and matches in the Yorkshire Premier League.

It is the home of Barnsley Cricket Club, for whom such players as Geoff Boycott, Dickie Bird and chat show host Michael Parkinson opened the batting. It is one of twelve grounds in the initial 'Chance to Shine' scheme for grassroots cricket. It has been known as Shaw Lane since 1863 but before then was known as the Clarence Ground.
