= North Yorkshire (disambiguation) =

North Yorkshire may refer to:

- North Yorkshire, the largest ceremonial county in England
- North Yorkshire (district), the largest non-metropolitan county in England, with a unitary authority
- North Riding of Yorkshire, a historic subdivision, region and former county in Yorkshire

== Politics ==
- Yorkshire North (European Parliament constituency), a constituency from 1979 to 1984
- North Yorkshire (European Parliament constituency), a constituency from 1994 to 1999
- Yorkshire North Riding (UK Parliament constituency), a constituency from 1832 to 1835

== Sport ==
- North Riding County Football Association, founded in 1881
  - North Riding Senior Cup
- North Riding Football League, association football league founded in 2017
- Yorkshire Premier League North, cricket league formed in 2016
- North Yorkshire and South Durham Cricket League, founded in 1892 and ECB Premier League since 2012

== Other ==
- North York Moors, a national park established in 1952
  - North Yorkshire Moors Railway, heritage railway
