= Jim Love (cricketer) =

English cricketer (born 1955)

Personal information
- Full name: James Derek Love
- Born: 22 April 1955 (age 71); Headingley, Leeds, Yorkshire, England
- Batting: Right-handed
- Bowling: Right-arm medium

International information
- National side: England
- ODI debut (cap 60): 4 June 1981 v Australia
- Last ODI: 8 June 1981 v Australia

Career statistics
Competition	ODI	FC	LA
Matches	3	250	238
Runs scored	61	10,355	4,962
Batting average	20.33	31.09	26.67
100s/50s	0/0	13/56	4/24
Top score	43	170*	118*
Balls bowled	–	1,413	204
Wickets	–	12	5
Bowling average	–	69.58	28.00
5 wickets in innings	–	0	0
10 wickets in match	–	0	0
Best bowling	–	2/0	2/17
Catches/stumpings	1/–	125/–	47/–
- Source: CricInfo, 6 July 2011

James Derek Love (born 22 April 1955) is a former English first-class cricketer, who played in three One Day Internationals for England in 1981. He played in 247 first-class cricket matches for Yorkshire from 1975 to 1989, as well as representing the Marylebone Cricket Club (MCC), Lincolnshire, the Minor Counties and Scotland.

== Life and career ==
Love was tipped for stardom but like the player he most resembled, John Hampshire his Yorkshire teammate, he never quite fulfilled his potential on the national stage. A tall, fair haired middle order batsman, he was particularly strong on the front foot, and a powerful driver of the ball. He played for Yorkshire between 1975 and 1989, and twice passed a thousand runs for a first-class season. He averaged 31.09 in 250 matches, in which he scored 10,355 runs with a best of 170 not out. Love scored 13 first-class centuries. He developed a reputation in the one day arena, where he averaged 26.67 with 4,962 runs in 238 games, with a best of 118 not out.

He played three ODIs for England against Australia in 1981, without doing enough to secure a permanent spot. Love's brightest hour was winning the Gold Award, in the 1987 Benson & Hedges Cup final versus Northamptonshire, for his unbeaten 75.

Love left Yorkshire at the end of 1989, playing Minor Counties Championship cricket for Lincolnshire, before joining Scotland team as a player and administrator. He eventually became Scotland's director of cricket, but resigned in 2001 to run a pub in Yorkshire. He is now coach at Yorkshire ECB County Premier League side, Scarborough Cricket Club.

Love was installed as President of the Yorkshire Players' Association by the retiring President, Phil Sharpe, at the Association's AGM in March 2011.
