= Barnsley Cricket Club =

Barnsley Woolley Miners Cricket Club members play in the Yorkshire ECB County Premier League ; the club won the league title in 2006 for the first time in its history. The club is based at Shaw Lane (Cricket Ground), which hosted four Benson and Hedges Cup ties in the 1970s and one first class match between Yorkshire and an All England XI in the 19th century.

Many famous cricketers began their careers at Barnsley, notably Geoffrey Boycott and Harold Dennis ''Dickie'' Bird while chat show host Michael Parkinson also batted for the team. They are now all vice presidents of the club while other players to have played for Barnsley in recent years include Arnie Sidebottom, Steve Oldham, Graham Stevenson, Martyn Moxon, Darren Gough, Mark Beardshall, Peter Heseltine, Alex Morris, Azeem Rafiq, Gary Ballance, and Oliver Hannon-Dalby.

The club has four senior teams being :
1st XI (Yorkshire ECB County Premier League)
2nd XI (South Yorkshire Cricket League)
3rd XI "Clarence" (South Yorkshire Cricket League)
4th XI "Beechfield" (Pontefract & District Cricket League)
