= North Staffordshire and South Cheshire League =

English cricket league

North Staffs and South Cheshire League
- Countries: England
- Administrator: ECB
- Format: Limited Overs
- First edition: 1963 (Founded); 2001 (ECB Premier League)
- Tournament format: League
- Number of teams: 12 (Premier Division)
- Current champion: Moddershall CC
- Most successful: Longton CC (11)
- Website: https://nssc.play-cricket.com/

The North Staffordshire and South Cheshire Premier Cricket League is the top level of competition for recreational club cricket in the North Staffordshire and South Cheshire area of England, and the league Headquarters is based in Stoke on Trent. The league was founded in 1963 and since 2001 it has been a designated ECB Premier League.

== Champions 1963-2000 ==
- League Champions 1963–1981
  Year	Club
  1963	Crewe L.M.R
  1964	Norton
  1965	Norton
  1966	Longton
  1967	Norton
  1968	Longton
  1969	Longton
  1970	Longton
  1971	Great Chell
  1972	Longton
  1973	Knypersley
  1974	Leek
  1975	Crewe L.M.R
  1976	Stone
  1977	Longton
  1978	Crewe
  1979	Stone
  1980	Nantwich
  1981	Nantwich
- League Champions 1982–2000
  Year	Club
  1982	Knypersley
  1983	Nantwich
  1984	Elworth
  1985	Newcastle & Hartshill
  1986	Crewe
  1987	Longton
  1988	Newcastle & Hartshill
  1989	Newcastle & Hartshill
  1990	Leek
  1991	Caverswall
  1992	Ashcombe Park
  1993	Cheadle
  1994	Audley
  1995	Knypersley
  1996	Stone
  1997	Moddershall
  1998	Little Stoke
  1999	Moddershall
  2000	Audley

== Champions 2001- (ECB Premier League era) ==
- League Champions 2001–2019
  Year	Club
  2001	Leek
  2002	Norton in Hales
  2003	Longton
  2004	Longton
  2005	Longton
  2006	Stone SP
  2007	Audley
  2008	Moddershall
  2009	Longton
  2010	Little Stoke
  2011	Wood Lane
  2012	Leek
  2013	Leek
  2014	Stone SP
  2015	Stone SP
  2016	Porthill Park
  2017	J & G Meakin
  2018	Porthill Park
  2019	Porthill Park
- League Champions 2020–2026
  Year	Club
  2020	COVID-19 pandemic
  2021	J & G Meakin
  2022	Porthill Park
  2023	Hem Heath
  2024	Hem Heath
  2025	Stone SP
  2026	Moddershall

=== Championships won (all-time) ===
- League Championship
  Wins	Club
  11	Longton
  7	Stone
  5	Leek
  4	Crewe
  4	Moddershall
  4	Porthill Park
  3	Audley
  3	Knypersley
  3	Nantwich
  3	Newcastle & Hartshill
  3	Norton
  2	Hem Heath
  2	J & G Meakin
  2	Little Stoke
  1	Ashcombe Park
  1	Caverswall
  1	Cheadle
  1	Elworth
  1	Great Chell
  1	Norton in Hales
  1	Wood Lane

== Performance by season from 2001 ==
Key
Gold	Champions
Blue	Left League
Red	Relegated

Premier Division performance by season, from 2001
Club	2001	2002	2003	2004	2005	2006	2007	2008	2009	2010	2011	2012	2013	2014	2015	2016	2017	2018	2019	2020	2021	2022	2023	2024	2025	2026
Alsager																									12	
Ashcombe Park																6	10	7	7		12					
Audley	10	10	2	5	7	4	1	5	8	2	5	7	11				11						6	10	7	6
Bagnall Norton																					5	7	8	8	11	
Barlaston		8	12			6	7	12		9	12															
Betley	3	3	11	6	12											7	12									
Blythe																		3	12							
Burslem					6	8	4	4	7	4	7	10	10	12			6	11			6	12		12		
Caverswall	6	6	7	12																						
Cheadle	11											11							3		7	10	3	11		
Checkley	9	9	5	4	8	11						9	3	9	2	5	7	4	6		4	3	4	6	4	3
Crewe	5	12																								
Eccleshall																							11			7
Elworth					11					11			12					12				6	12			
Hem Heath							12		9	10	3	8	8	5	10	9	9	10	11			5	1	1	6	2
Knypersley	8	11		10	4	2	9	6	6	6	10	4	5	2	4	11										
Leek	1	4	8	7	9	5	6	2	12		2	1	1	6	5	8	3	8	10		10	9	10	2	2	10
Leycett									11																	
Little Stoke	12		6	3	5	12		8	2	1	8	12		10	11											
Longton	2	2	1	1	1	10	8	3	1	5	9	2	4	8	8	4	8	6	9		2	4	9	9	9	12
J G Meakin														4	6	2	1	2	2		1	11		7	3	4
Meir Heath			9	11		9	11																			
Moddershall (Note: Moddershall entered into a merger after the 2016 season and became Moddershall and Oulton.)	7	7	4	8	2	7	10	1	10	12					7	12							5	5	8	1
Moddershall and Oulton																			5		8	2				
Newcastle and Hartshill															12										5	8
Norton in Hales (Note: Norton in Hales resigned from the Premier Division after the 2003 season.)		1	3																							
Porthill Park	4	5	10	9	10	3	3	10	4	7	4	5	6	7	9	1	2	1	1		3	1	2	4	10	9
Sandyford											11															
Stafford								11																		
Stone SP				2	3	1	2	7	3	3	6	6	2	1	1	3	4	5	4		9	8	7	3	1	5
Whitmore													9	3	3	10	5	9	8		11					11
Wood Lane							5	9	5	8	1	3	7	11												
References																				(Note: Coronavirus pandemic forced a reduction in league activity. A replacement competition was organised for the later part of the season when cricket again became possible, but with the winners not to be regarded as official league champions.)						
