= Alderley Edge Cricket Club =

Amateur cricket club based at Alderley Edge in Cheshire, England

Alderley Edge Cricket Club is an amateur cricket club based at Alderley Edge in Cheshire. The club's first team plays in the Cheshire County Cricket League, which is one of the ECB Premier Leagues that are the highest level of the amateur, recreational sport in England and Wales.

Alderley Edge were the league champions for the first time in 2008, and also won the county's knock-out cup, which is organised on a Twenty20 basis.

The Alderley Edge ground at Moss Lane has hosted Minor Counties matches for Cheshire County Cricket Club, plus one List A match in the Cheltenham and Gloucester Trophy competition, between Cheshire and Hampshire.

== See also ==
- Alderley Edge CC website
