= International cricket in 1904 =

International cricket season

The 1904 international cricket season was from April 1904 to September 1904.

== Season overview ==
International tours
Start date	Home team	Away team	Results [Matches]			
Start date	Home team	Away team	Test	ODI	FC	LA
30 May 1904	England	South Africa	—	—	0–2 [3]	—
5 September 1904	Netherlands	England	—	—	1–2 [3]	—

== May ==
=== South Africa in England ===
First-class series
No.	Date	Home captain	Away captain	Venue	Result
Match 1	30 May–1 June	W. G. Grace	Frank Mitchell	Lord's, London	Match drawn
Match 2	14–16 July	Not mentioned	Frank Mitchell	Lord's, London	South Africa by 189 runs
Match 1	11–13 August	Not mentioned	Frank Mitchell	Lord's, London	South Africa by 10 wickets

== September ==
=== England in Netherlands ===
Two-day match series
No.	Date	Home captain	Away captain	Venue	Result
Match 1	5–6 September	Not mentioned	Not mentioned	Haarlem	North-Holland by 41 runs
Match 2	7–8 September	Not mentioned	Not mentioned	The Hague	St Lawrence CC by an innings and 32 runs
Match 3	9–10 September	Not mentioned	Not mentioned	The Hague	St Lawrence CC by an innings and 48 runs
