= Philip Hart (disambiguation) =

Philip Hart (1912–1976) was an American lawyer and politician.

Philip Hart may also refer to:

- Philip Hart (cricketer) (born 1947), English cricketer
- Philip Hart (organist) (died 1749), English organist
- Phil Hart (politician), American politician from Idaho
- Philip D'Arcy Hart (1900–2006), British medical researcher
- Tiger Hart (Philip Manston Hart, 1907–1996), English motorcycle speedway rider
