= Toft Cricket Club =

Cricket club in Cheshire, England

Toft Cricket Club is an amateur cricket club that was founded in 1928. The club's first team plays in the Cheshire County Cricket League, which is one of the ECB Premier Leagues that are the highest level of the amateur, recreational sport in England and Wales.

The club has over 400 members. There are five men's senior sides (1st XI, 2nd XI, 3rd XI, 3A XI and 4th XI), a women's team (playing both soft and hard ball cricket) and an over-40s team. The club's junior section runs nine junior teams and have a charity side called the Toft Taverners.

The club's home ground is Booths Park, Chelford Road, Knutsford, Cheshire. The Cricket Club gets its name from a neighbouring civil parish of Toft where the original ground was located when the club was established in 1928. The Pavilion at Toft Cricket Club has served the club and community well for over 50 years but the club are currently seeking to raise £1million (https://www.justgiving.com/fundraising/Toft-Cricket-Club) to achieve a world class facility that can be enjoyed by players, supporters and visitors alike. The target is to lunch the new facility in-time for our centenary in 2028.

Toft play in the ECB Premier Division of the Cheshire County Cricket League which the club won in 1991. The clubs crowning achievement was winning the National Village Championship trophy at Lords in 1989.
