= Scarborough Festival =

The Scarborough Festival is an end of season series of cricket matches featuring Yorkshire County Cricket Club which has been held in Scarborough, on the east coast of Yorkshire, since 1876. The ground, at North Marine Road, sees large crowds of holiday makers watching a mixture of first-class county cricket, one-day fixtures and invitation XIs in the late August/early September sunshine every year. Many of the world's greatest cricketers have played in festival matches over the years.

There have been 399 first-class matches at Scarborough, the vast majority of these in the festival and as well as Yorkshire's games against county opposition ad hoc teams under the name of H. D. G. Leveson-Gower, Tom Pearce, Brian Close and Michael Parkinson have entertained touring teams and World XIs on many occasions. A one-day competition, under the names of various sponsors, was played in the seventies, eighties and nineties and featured four counties who would play a knockout semi final and final for the cup.

Two of the greatest batsmen in history scored double hundreds during the festival. Jack Hobbs amassed an unbeaten 266 for the Players against the Gentlemen in 1925 while Sir Len Hutton hit 241 in the same fixture in 1953. The prolific Philip Mead of Hampshire scored two double tons, 233 for the MCC against Lord Hawke's XI in 1929 and 223 for the Players against the long suffering Gentlemen in 1911. The highest innings in festival history came when Ken Rutherford, the former New Zealand Test captain, smashed 317 in a day for the New Zealand tourists against D. B. Close's XI in 1986.

The batsmen did not always have it their own way. The great Wilfred Rhodes pocketed 9 for 24 for CI Thornton's XI v. Australians in 1899 and J. M. Preston had taken 9 for 28 for Yorkshire against Marylebone Cricket Club 11 years before. Johnny Briggs took 9 for 31 for Lord Londesborough's XI v. the Australians in 1890 and Bill Bowes laboured hard to take 9 for 121 for Yorkshire against Essex in 1932.

The ground, with its limited boundaries, hard outfield and excellent pitch, has seen many high scores during the festival. The Surrey dynamo Ali Brown thrashed 133 in company with Graham Thorpe (102*) to help Surrey to 375 for 4 in just 40 overs in a Sunday League match in 1994 while Yorkshire themselves clobbered Nottinghamshire for 352 in 45 overs in 2001 thanks to Darren Lehmann's incredible 191 which came off 103 balls in 115 minutes with 20 fours and 11 sixes.

In first-class cricket Yorkshire declared on 600 for 4 against Worcestershire in 1995, thanks to David Byas's double century and an unbeaten ton from Craig White, while the North of England posted 590 against the South of England in 1906.
