= Cowap =

Cowap is a surname. Notable people with this surname include:

- Henri Cowap (1861–1930), Australian politician
- Ian Cowap (1950–2016), English cricketer
