= York Cricket Club =

English cricket club

York Cricket Club is an English amateur cricket club based in York. The club became a founding member of the Yorkshire Cricket League in 1935. The club also has three teams in the York and District Senior Cricket League. York Cricket Club won the ECB National Club Cricket Championship in 1975 and 2012. The club coach is former Yorkshire and England player Jim Love.

The club is based at Clifton Park. The site also houses York Squash Club, York Tennis Club, and York Rugby Football Union Club which together form the York Sports Club.

On 17 June 2019, their ground hosted the 2019 County Championship game between Yorkshire and Warwickshire. It was the first time that Yorkshire had played in York, since 1890. The club subsequently hosted two One-Day Cup games in 2021.

== Honours ==
- Yorkshire Cricket League
  - Winners 1951, 1970, 1974, 1977, 1988, 2004, 2007, 2008, 2009, 2010, 2011, 2012 and 2015.
