= Christopher Clifford =

English cricketer

Christopher Craven Clifford (born 5 July 1942 in Hovingham, Yorkshire, England) is a former English first-class cricketer, who played for Yorkshire in 1972, and for Warwickshire from 1978 to 1980.

== History ==
Clifford was a right arm off-break bowler, and tail end right-handed batsman. In 47 first-class matches, he scored 210 runs at an average of 7.24, with a highest score of 26. He took 126 wickets at 37.61 each, with a career best of 6–89. He took an additional five wickets in his three one day appearances.

Chris Clifford is the leading wicket taker of all time in the Yorkshire League, setting a target of 1,400 wickets; a record which is unlikely to ever be beaten. He played for Scarborough for 40 years, taking a record 1,600 wickets. As of 2011 he was still playing for his village team, Seamer & Irton.
