= David Byas =

English cricketer

Personal information
- Born: 26 August 1963 (age 63); Middledale, Kilham, East Riding of Yorkshire
- Height: 6 ft 4 in (1.93 m)
- Batting: Left-handed
- Bowling: Right-arm medium
- Role: Opening batsman

Domestic team information
- Years: Team
- 1986–2001: Yorkshire
- 2002: Lancashire
- FC debut: 9 August 1986 Yorkshire v Glamorgan
- Last FC: 19 September 2002 Lancashire v Somerset
- LA debut: 11 May 1985 Yorkshire v Leicestershire
- Last LA: 15 September 2002 Lancashire v Middlesex

Career statistics
Competition	First-class	List A
Matches	283	333
Runs scored	15,082	8,116
Batting average	35.07	28.67
100s/50s	29/83	5/46
Top score	213	116*
Balls bowled	1,118	848
Wickets	12	25
Bowling average	60.58	26.36
5 wickets in innings	0	0
10 wickets in match	0	0
Best bowling	3/55	3/19
Catches/stumpings	366/–	139/–
- Source: CricketArchive, 22 July 2009

David Byas (born 26 August 1963)) is an English first-class cricketer, who played for Yorkshire and latterly Lancashire, in a 17-year first-class career.

Byas grew up on a farm in Yorkshire, having attended school at Scarborough College. He was a left-handed batsman who scored a century on the day his son was born, and very occasionally bowled right-arm medium pace. He was appointed Yorkshire's captain at the start of the 1996 season, following the resignation of Martyn Moxon. In 2001, he led the county to their first County Championship title win in 33 years, sealing the championship with a catch taken at North Marine Road. The following season he signed for Lancashire CCC, becoming one of the few players to play for both counties.

In 1995, Byas was on the verge of an England call-up, having been the first player to reach 1,000 runs in that season, only the return to fitness of Michael Atherton and Graeme Hick, prevented him from doing so. In total he scored 1,913 runs in the whole campaign.

His highest score of 213 was made at his home ground of North Marine Road. He was one of only five players to achieve a double-hundred in the first-class game at this stadium.

Byas started his career in 1978, as a second-team player at Scarborough. However, he ultimately helped the club to the latter two of their five ECB National Club Cricket Championship titles (1981 and 1982) at Lord's. In 1984, he set a record in the now former Yorkshire League, by scoring 1,349 runs for the season, a record which stood for 19 years.

Since retiring, Byas has been a manager and coach at Scarborough, in charge of cricket development at Pocklington School, a senior cricket advisor at Yorkshire County Cricket Club, and runs his own cricket school, the 'Byas Academy'.

In November 2021, it came to light that Byas had been named in the witness statement of Azeem Rafiq for an employment tribunal regarding racism Rafiq had faced at Yorkshire County Cricket Club. It was alleged that Byas regularly used racist language and nicknames. Byas denied these allegations.
