= Bowdon Cricket Club =

Amateur cricket club based in Bowdon, Greater Manchester

Bowdon Cricket Club is an amateur cricket club based at South Downs Road, Bowdon in Greater Manchester. The club's first team plays in the Cheshire County Cricket League, which is one of the ECB Premier Leagues that are the highest level of the amateur, recreational sport in England and Wales. The club was founded in 1856.

Bowdon has been one of the most successful clubs in North West England and has been the champions of the Cheshire League nine times since the league was formed in 1975, including three consecutive victories twice, in 1996 to 1998 and 2002 to 2004. It has also won the county's knock-out cup four times and the League Cup three times.

The Bowdon ground at South Downs Road has hosted Minor Counties matches for Cheshire County Cricket Club for many years, plus List A matches in the Benson and Hedges Cup and the NatWest Trophy competitions.

Bowdon will compete in the Cheshire County Cricket League Premier division in 2022 after they were crowned Division 1 champions in 2021.

== See also ==
- Bowdon CC website
