= Bolton Cricket League =

The Bolton Cricket League is a cricket league comprising fifteen teams in and around Bolton, Greater Manchester in North West England. The league runs competitions at First Team, Second Team, Under 18, Under 15, Under 13 and Under 11 levels. It expanded after the 2015 season, with nine clubs joining from in and around the area. However, the league lost two established clubs in the process, due to the formation of the Greater Manchester Cricket League in 2016.

In October 2022, the Bolton Cricket League and the Ribblesdale Cricket League merged to create the North West Cricket League. Bolton League Club, Little Lever CC, were 'Senior Premiership' champions in the inaugural season, 2023.

== History ==
The league was established in 1930 after breaking away from the Bolton Cricket Association. The League Heahquarters is based at Barley Brook Meadow, Bolton, Lancashire. The League also hold the Hamer Cup competition; a knockout cup competition for first teams in the Bolton Cricket League. The most successful team(s) to date is both Walkden and Farnworth who became league champions for the fourteenth time in 2019 and 2017 respectively.

== Champions ==
League Champions, 1930–1949
Year	Club
1930	Farnworth
1931	
1932	Tonge
1933	Heaton
1934	Farnworth
1935	
1936	Bradshaw
1937	Farnworth
1938	Eagley
1939	Tonge
1940	Westhoughton
1941	Westhoughton
1942	Westhoughton
1943	Eagley
1944	Eagley
1945	Bradshaw
1946	Little Lever
1947	Farnworth
1948	Walkden
1949	Farnworth

League Champions, 1950–1969
Year	Club
1950	Walkden
1951	Walkden
1952	Walkden
1953	Horwich
1954	Bradshaw
1955	Horwich
1956	Westhoughton
1957	Little Lever
1958	Heaton
1959	Farnworth
1960	Farnworth
1961	Walkden
1962	Walkden
1963	Bradshaw
1964	Farnworth
1965	Farnworth
1966	Little Lever
1967	Tonge
1968	Tonge
1969	Tonge

League Champions, 1970–1989
Year	Club
1970	Astley Bridge
1971	Westhoughton
1972	Little Lever
1973	Tonge
1974	Kearsley
1975	Kearsley
1976	Bradshaw
1977	Bradshaw
1978	Horwich
1979	Kearsley
1980	Westhoughton
1981	Little Lever
1982	Kearsley
1983	Horwich
1984	Farnworth
1985	Farnworth Social Circle
1986	Kearsley
1987	Farnworth Social Circle
1988	Greenmount
1989	Walkden

League Champions, 1990–2009
Year	Club
1990	Kearsley
1991	Farnworth Social Circle
1992	Bradshaw
1993	Kearsley
1994	Farnworth Social Circle
1995	Little Lever
1996	Tonge
1997	Tonge
1998	Tonge
1999	Tonge
2000	Kearsley
2001	Walkden
2002	Tonge
2003	Walkden
2004	Westhoughton
2005	Farnworth
2006	Walkden
2007	Walkden
2008	Walkden
2009	Farnworth Social Circle

League Champions, 2010–2019
Year	Club
2010	Farnworth
2011	Greenmount
2012	Farnworth
2013	Little Lever
2014	Farnworth Social Circle
2015	Egerton
2016	Farnworth Social Circle
2017	Farnworth
2018	Walkden
2019	Walkden
2020	League suspended
2021	Horwich RMI

== League performance by season from 2011 ==
Key
Gold	Champions
Blue	Left League
Red	Relegated

Performance by season, from 2011
Club	2011	2012	2013	2014	2015	2016	2017	2018	2019	2020	2021
Adlington						14			10		
Astley Bridge	6	13	11	9	7	19					
Atherton						13		9			
Blackrod						11					
Bradshaw	8	7	7	2	5	8	2	6	9		
Daisy Hill						15		10			
Darcy Lever						16					
Eagley	13	12	14	14	11	10	9				
Egerton (Note: Egerton left the league after the 2015 season.)	11	3	3	7	1						
Farnworth	5	1	5	5	4	4	1	2	2		8
Farnworth Social Circle	4	5	6	1	3	1	5	5	6		3
Golborne						17					
Greenmount	1	2	4	6	6						
Heaton	9	10	10	11	12	9	10				
Horwich RMI	2	4	9	4	13	5	7	3	3		1
Kearsley	10	9	12	8	8	7	3	4	4		
Little Hulton						18					
Little Lever	12	6	1	12	10	12			7		4
Lostock						6	8	8	5		6
Standish						20					
Tonge	14	11	13	13	14	21					7
Walkden	3	8	8	10	9	2	6	1	1		5
Westhoughton	7	14	2	3	2	3	4	7	8		2
References										(Note: Coronavirus pandemic forced a reduction in league activity.)	

== Notable players ==
A number of quality cricketers have played in the Bolton Cricket League including:

- Michael Atherton
- Ian Cowap
- John Crawley
- Kapil Dev
- Charlie Griffith
- Matthew Hayden
- Ronnie Irani
- Dheeraj Jadhav
- Collis King
- Javed Miandad
- Dilip Vengsarkar
- Sir Garfield Sobers
- Mark Taylor
- Mark Waugh
- Farokh Engineer
- Aiden Markram
- Devon Conway
- Atiq Uz-Zaman
- Agha Salman
- Ross Sutton
- Josh Bohannon
- Callum Parkinson
- Matt Parkinson
- Haseeb Hameed
- Footballing brothers Gary Neville and Phil Neville also played in the Bolton Cricket League.

== See also ==
- Club cricket
- List of English cricket clubs
