= Yorkshire ECB County Premier League =

Cricket competition in England, 1999 to 2015

- Countries: England
- Administrator: ECB
- Format: Limited overs cricket
- First edition: 1999 (ECB Premier League)
- Latest edition: 2015
- Tournament format: League
- Number of teams: 12 (ECB Premier Division)
- Current champion: York CC
- Most successful: York CC (9 Titles)

The Yorkshire ECB County Premier League was the top level of competition for recreational club cricket in Yorkshire, England, and between 1999 and 2015 was a designated ECB Premier League.

The league was formed in 1999 and replaced the Yorkshire Cricket League, which ran from 1936 to 1998 as the major cricketing league in Yorkshire. The Yorkshire Cricket League was originally formed as a breakaway from the Yorkshire Cricket Council in 1936 when the main teams in the league wanted to create a separate league with traditional home and away fixtures, whereas the Yorkshire Cricket Council gave clubs the opportunity to create up to 22 matches against any side in the league. The 1999 season featured the same 14 clubs from the previous season, with the only difference being the name change and the acceptance of the ECB Premier Leagues

The competing teams in 2015, which was the league's last season, were: Appleby Frodingham, Barnsley, Castleford, Cleethorpes, Doncaster Town, Driffield Town, Harrogate, Hull, Rotherham Town, Sheffield Collegiate, Sheffield United, York, and Yorkshire CCC Academy. After the 2015 season, the league was reconfigured to form the basis of two new regionalised leagues.

Castleford, Driffield, Harrogate, Hull, York, and Yorkshire CCC Academy joined a new Yorkshire Premier League North, together with six clubs promoted from the York and District Senior League (Acomb, Dunnington, Scarborough, Sheriff Hutton Bridge, Stamford Bridge, and Woodhouse Grange).

Appleby Frodingham, Barnsley, Cleethorpes, Doncaster Town, Rotherham Town, Sheffield Collegiate, and Sheffield & Phoenix United (formed from a merger between Sheffield United and their neighbouring club, Rotherham Phoenix) joined a new Yorkshire South Premier League, together with four clubs promoted from the South Yorkshire League (Aston Hall, Treeton, Whitley Hall, and Wickersley Old Village) and one from the Central Yorkshire League (Wakefield Thornes).

Both of these new leagues had ECB Premier League status from the outset, and the Bradford Premier League was also awarded this status effective from 2016. The winners of these three leagues, together with the highest placed Yorkshire club in the North Yorkshire and South Durham Cricket League, then contest a Yorkshire Championship.

== Winners ==
Year	Champions
1999	Doncaster
2000	Sheffield Collegiate
2001	Sheffield Collegiate
2002	Harrogate
2003	Cleethorpes
2004	York
2005	Harrogate
2006	Barnsley
2007	York
2008	York
2009	York
2010	York
2011	York
2012	York
2013	York
2014	Yorkshire CCC Academy
2015	York

== Performance by season ==
Key
Gold	Champions
Blue	Left League

Performance by season: 1999 - 2015
Club	1999	2000	2001	2002	2003	2004	2005	2006	2007	2008	2009	2010	2011	2012	2013	2014	2015
Appleby Frodingham	7	11	8	14	13	14	13	14	14	13	11	12	10	13	10	10	8
Barnsley	14	14	14	7	10	10	3	1	2	5	5	2	8	3	8	3	2
Castleford	6	9	10	6	4	8	4	9	7	2	4	6	7	12	13	11	10
Cleethorpes	8	10	6	8	1	5	10	10	12	8	6	9	3	8	9	5	6
Doncaster Town	1	4	7	3	7	4	5	3	13	4	7	8	14	11	5	8	9
Driffield Town	12	13	13	13	8	6	14	13	5	11	8	11	12	6	6	7	7
Harrogate	2	2	5	2	2	3	1	12	11	14	12	7	9	2	3	4	4
Hull (Note: Hull did not run a 1st XI in the 2014 season, but returned to the league for 2015.)	11	6	12	11	11	13	11	8	9	7	14	13	13	9	12		13
Rotherham Town	3	12	11	12	14	12	12	6	6	3	9	5	2	5	11	9	5
Scarborough (Note: Scarborough played in the York and District Senior League in 2015, having been guaranteed a place in the Yorkshire Premier League North for 2016.)	4	8	2	10	6	7	9	11	4	9	2	4	6	7	4	12	
Sheffield Collegiate	5	1	1	1	5	2	6	5	8	10	10	10	5	14	7	6	11
Sheffield United	13	3	3	4	9	11	8	7	10	12	13	14	11	10	14	13	12
York	9	5	9	9	3	1	2	2	1	1	1	1	1	1	1	2	1
Yorkshire Academy	10	7	4	5	12	9	7	4	3	6	3	3	4	4	2	1	3
References																	
