= Priestley Cup =

The Priestley Cup is a cricket cup competition contested by clubs in the Bradford Premier League. It is one of the most prestigious club competitions in English cricket and is widely reported by regional media. Matches are played on Sunday afternoons over five rounds, with the final being played at a predetermined neutral venue in late August.

The Cup is named for Sir William Priestley, who was President of the Bradford Cricket League when the competition was founded and donated the silver trophy that continues to be presented to the victorious club.

27 teams have won the competition, which celebrated its centenary in 2004. Undercliffe has been the most successful club with 13 wins up to 2008.

Winners

Year	Winners	Runners-up
1904	Allerton	Shelf
1905	Saltaire	Clayton
1906	Great Horton	Clayton
1907	Windhill	Bankfoot
1908	Undercliffe	Shelf
1909	Great Horton	Lidget Green
1910	Undercliffe	Great Horton
1911	Great Horton	Windhill
1912	Idle	Undercliffe
1913	Bradford	Great Horton
1914	Bradford	Windhill
1915	Bowling Old Lane	Windhill
1916	Undercliffe	Tong Park
1917	Undercilffe	Tong Park
1918*	Saltaire	Bankfoot
1919	Undercliffe	Pudsey St Lawrence
1920	Bowling Old Lane	Bankfoot
1921	Keighley	Saltaire
1922	Bowling Old Lane	Saltaire
1923	Idle	Bowling Old Lane
1924	Lidget Green	Bradford
1925	Windhill	Lidget Green
1926	Lightcliffe	Lidget Green
1927	Saltaire	Queensbury
1928	Bingley	Bowling Old Lane
1929	Bradford	Bowling Old Lane
1930	Idle	East Bierley
1931	Undercliffe	Bowling Old Lane
1932	Keighley	Bowling Old Lane
1933	Undercliffe	East Bierley
1934	Bradford	Bowling Old Lane
1935	Keighley	Great Horton
1936	Spen Victoria	Lightcliffe
1937	Lightcliffe	Great Horton
1938	Undercliffe	Windhill
1939	Eccleshill	Spen Victoria
1940	Undercliffe	Lidget Green
1941	Saltaire	Undercliffe
1942	Saltaire	Windhill
1943	Pudsey St. Lawrence	Brighouse
1944	Spen Victoria	Yeadon
1945	Yeadon	Pudsey St Lawrence
1946	Eccleshill	Baildon Green
1947	Yeadon	Salts
1948	Keighley	Salts
1949	Yeadon	Farsley
1950	Lightcliffe	East Bierley
1951	Idle	Queensbury
1952	Baildon	Keighley
1953	Bradford	Idle
1954	Bradford	Pudsey St Lawrence
1955	Lightcliffe	Pudsey St Lawrence
1956	Pudsey St Lawrence	Spen Victoria
1957	Bradford	East Bierley
1958	Salts	Lidget Green
1959	Bradford	Bowling Old Lane
1960	Bradford	Saltaire
1961	Keighley	Bowling Old Lane
1962	Bradford	East Bierley
1963	Farsley	Bradford
1964	Lightcliffe	East Bierley

Year	Winners	Runner-up
1965	Idle	Bowling Old Lane
1966	Bradford	Laisterdyke
1967	Bingley	Bradford
1968	Bowling Old Lane	Saltaire
1969	Bingley	Spen Victoria
1970	Bradford	Bingley
1971	Bingley	Spen Victoria
1972	Undercliffe	Lightcliffe
1973	Bradford	Bingley
1974	Undercliffe	Bingley
1975	Undercliffe	Manningham Mills
1976	Idle	Bingley
1977	Manningham Mills	Lightcliffe
1978	Bingley	Undercliffe
1979	Bingley	Manningham Mills
1980	Undercliffe	East Bierley
1981	East Bierley	Farsley
1982	Eccleshill	Undercliffe
1983	Farsley	Yorkshire Bank
1984	East Bierley	Keighley
1985	Hanging Heaton	Undercliffe
1986	Hanging Heaton	Eccleshill
1987	Bingley	Pudsey St Lawrence
1988	Pudsey St Lawrence	Yorkshire Bank
1989	Yorkshire Bank	East Bierley
1990	Spen Victoria	Pudsey St Lawrence
1991	East Bierley	Yorkshire Bank
1992	Yorkshire Bank	Baildon
1993	Yorkshire Bank	East Bierley
1994	Pudsey Congs	Yeadon
1995	Farsley	East Bierley
1996	Baildon	Bradford & Bingley
1997	Pudsey St Lawrence	East Bierley
1998	East Bierley	Pudsey Congs
1999	East Bierley	Yeadon
2000	East Bierley	Hanging Heaton
2001	Baildon	Yeadon
2002	Pudsey Congs	Pudsey St Lawrence
2003	Bradford & Bingley	Woodlands
2004	Pudsey Congs	Woodlands
2005	Pudsey Congs	Woodlands
2006	Woodlands	Bowling Old Lane
2007	Pudsey Congs	Cleckheaton
2008	Pudsey Congs	Woodlands
2009	East Bierley	Farsley
2010	Bradford & Bingley	Farsley
2011	Pudsey St Lawrence	East Bierley
2012	East Bierley	Manningham Mills
2013	Lightcliffe	Hanging Heaton
2014	Pudsey St Lawrence	Cleckheaton
2015	Bradford & Bingley	Lightcliffe
2016	Woodlands	Pudsey St Lawrence
2017	New Farnley	Methley
2018	Woodlands	Farsley
2019	Woodlands	New Farnley
2020	No Competition (COVID)	
2021	New Farnley	Townville
2022	New Farnley	Methley
2023	Bradford & Bingley	Woodlands
2024	Woodlands	Bradford & Bingley
2025	Townville	Pudsey St Lawrence
