= South Downs Road Cricket Ground, Bowdon =

Sports venue in Greater Manchester, England

South Downs Road
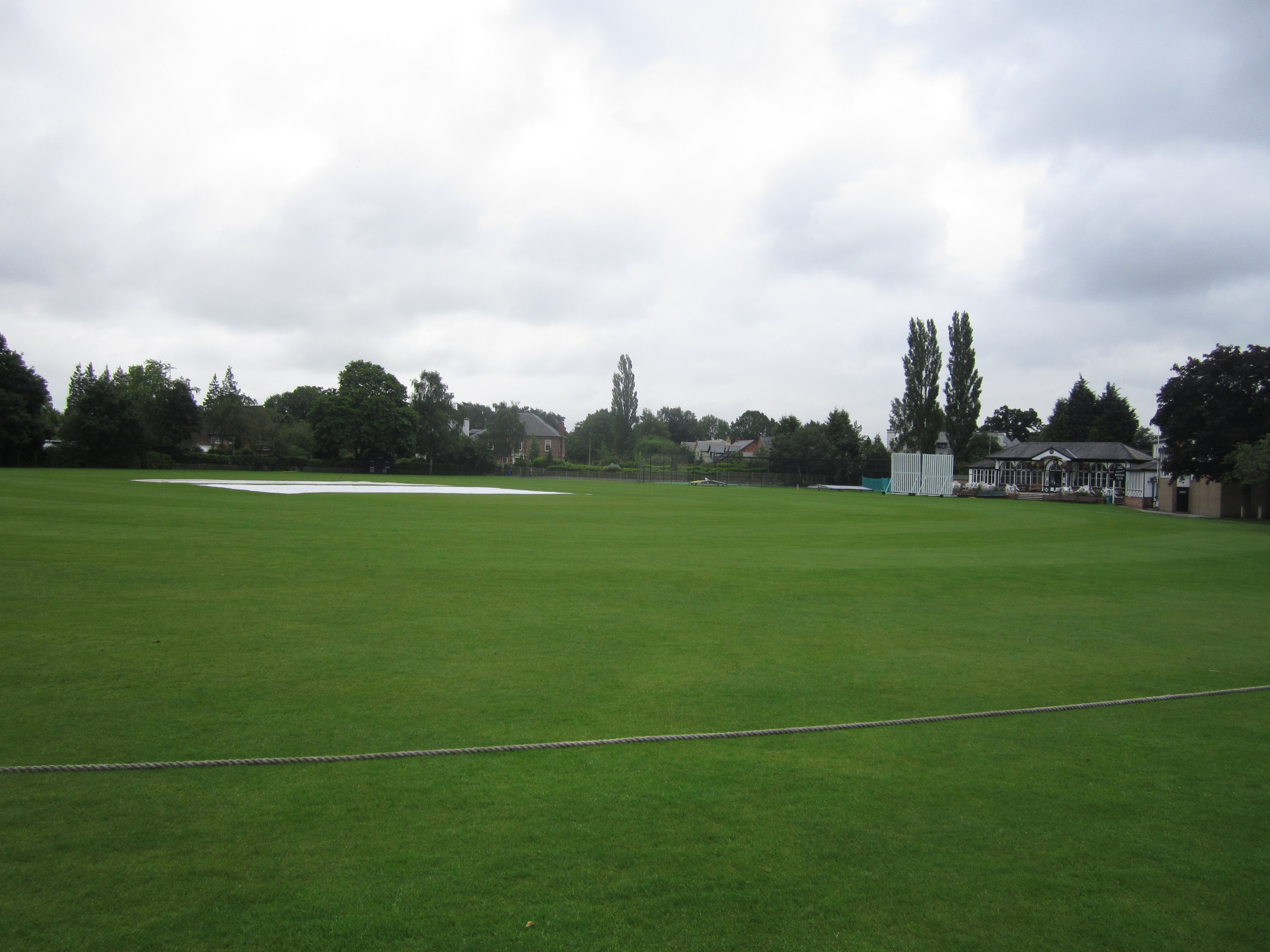
- Interactive map of South Downs Road

Ground information
- Location: Bowdon, Greater Manchester
- Country: England
- Coordinates: 53.3738°N 2.3550°W
- Establishment: 1865

Team information
Minor Counties	(1984)
Cheshire	(1910–2001)
- As of 11 July 2012; Source: Ground profile

South Downs Road is a cricket ground in South Downs Road, Bowdon, Greater Manchester (formerly Cheshire). The ground is surrounded by residential housing on all sides. The ground is used by Bowdon Cricket Club. It also has facilities for field hockey and squash.

== History ==
Bowdon Cricket Club was founded in 1856 and first played at South Downs Road in 1865, having agreed to rent the ground from the 7th Earl of Stamford. The ground pavilion was constructed in 1874, with its original facade remaining to this day. Cheshire first played at the ground in the 1910 Minor Counties Championship against Durham. However, Cheshire would not return to the ground until 1933, when they played Denbighshire in the Minor Counties Championship, which would be the last time they would play there for 43 years. In 1939, Helen Bickham bought the ground from the 10th Earl of Stamford in memory of her brother, Ernest Bickham, and proceeded to donate it to the cricket club.

Minor counties cricket returned to the ground in 1976, when Cheshire played the Somerset Second XI in the Minor Counties Championship. From 1980 to 2001, Cheshire played annually at the ground, with the final Minor Counties Championship match hosted there seeing Shropshire. The ground held its first List A match when it was selected as a home venue for the combined Minor Counties cricket team, with the team playing Lancashire there in the 1984 Benson & Hedges Cup. Cheshire later played two List A matches there, in the 1994 NatWest Trophy against Durham and in the 1999 NatWest Trophy against Kent, with both their first-class opponents winning.

== Records ==
=== List A ===
- Highest team total: 312/7 (50 overs) by Kent v Cheshire, 1999
- Lowest team total: 107/9 (47 overs) by Cheshire v Durham, 1994
- Highest individual innings: 123 by Nigel Llong for Kent v Cheshire, 1999
- Best bowling in an innings: 5/22 by Simon Brown for Durham v Cheshire, 1994

== Gallery ==
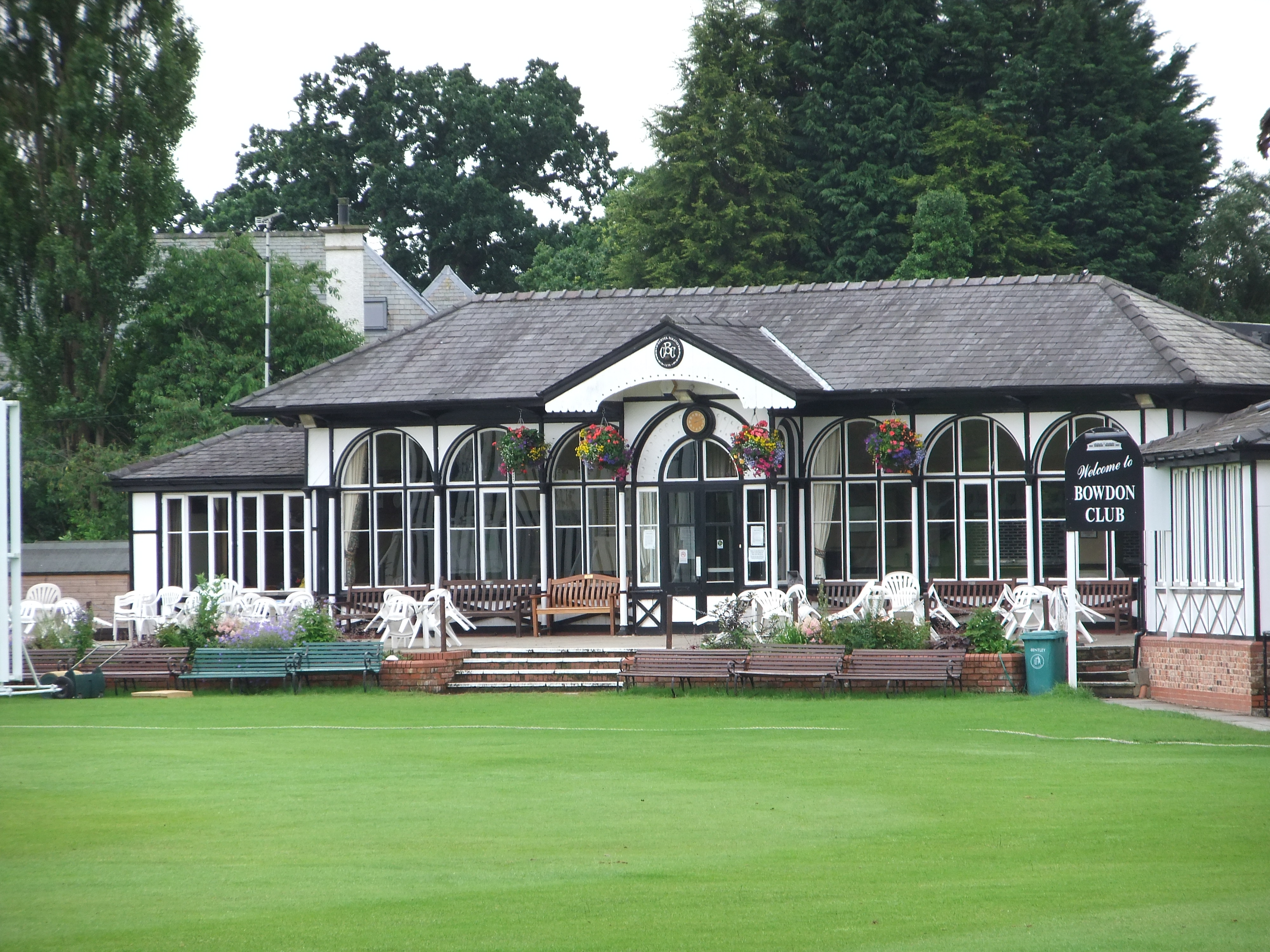
View of the pavilion.

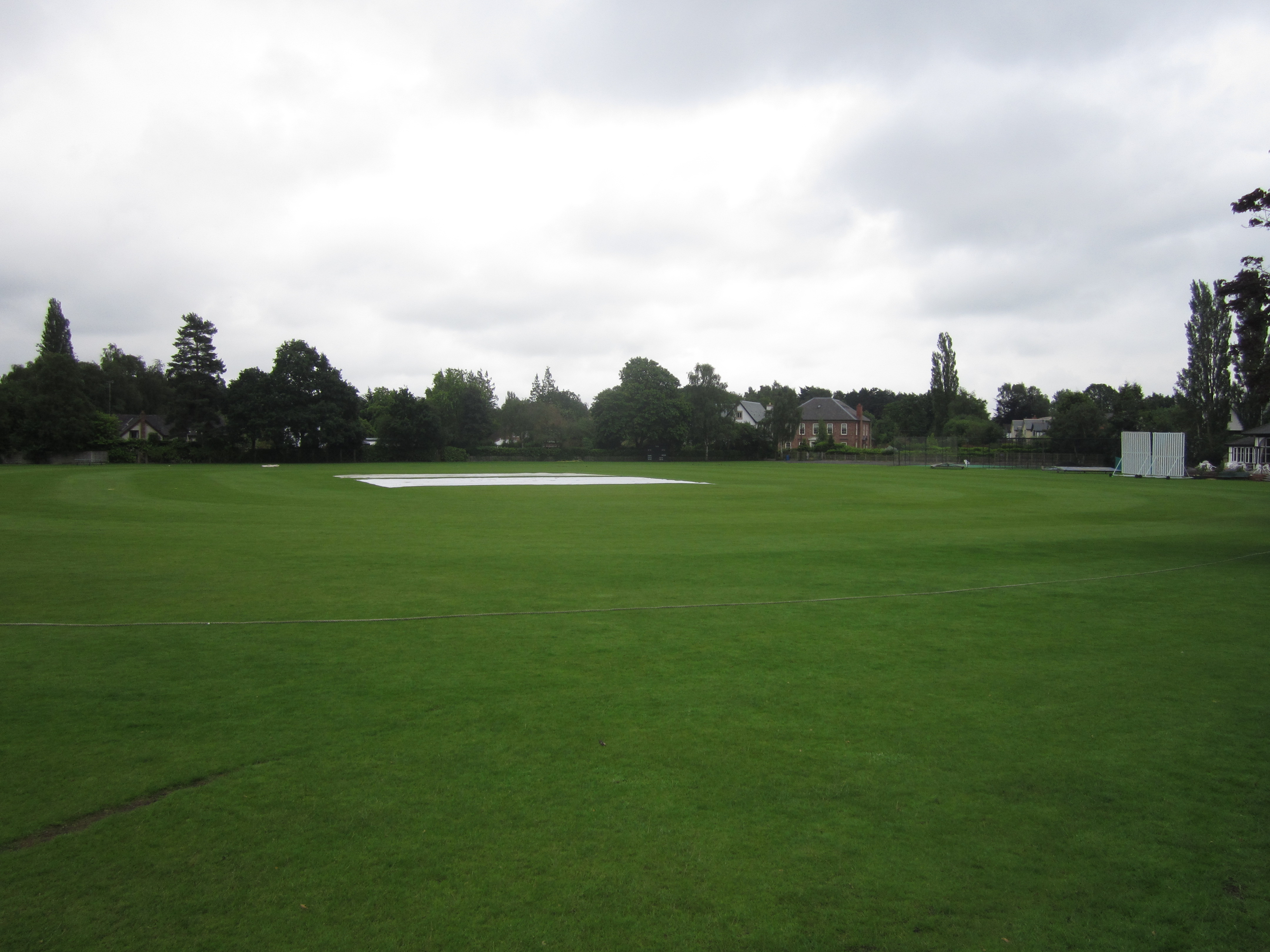
Wider view of the ground.

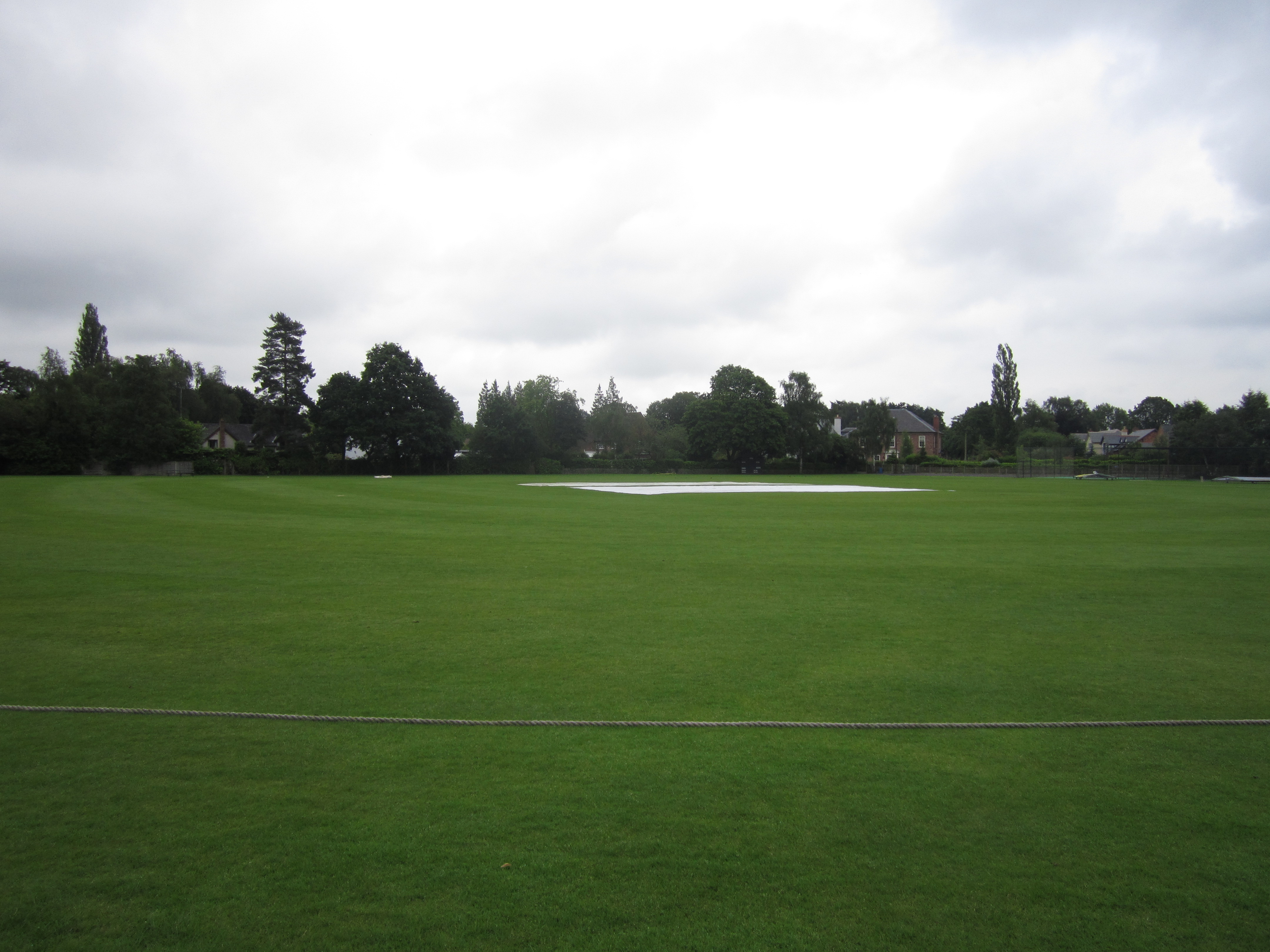
View of the ground looking north.

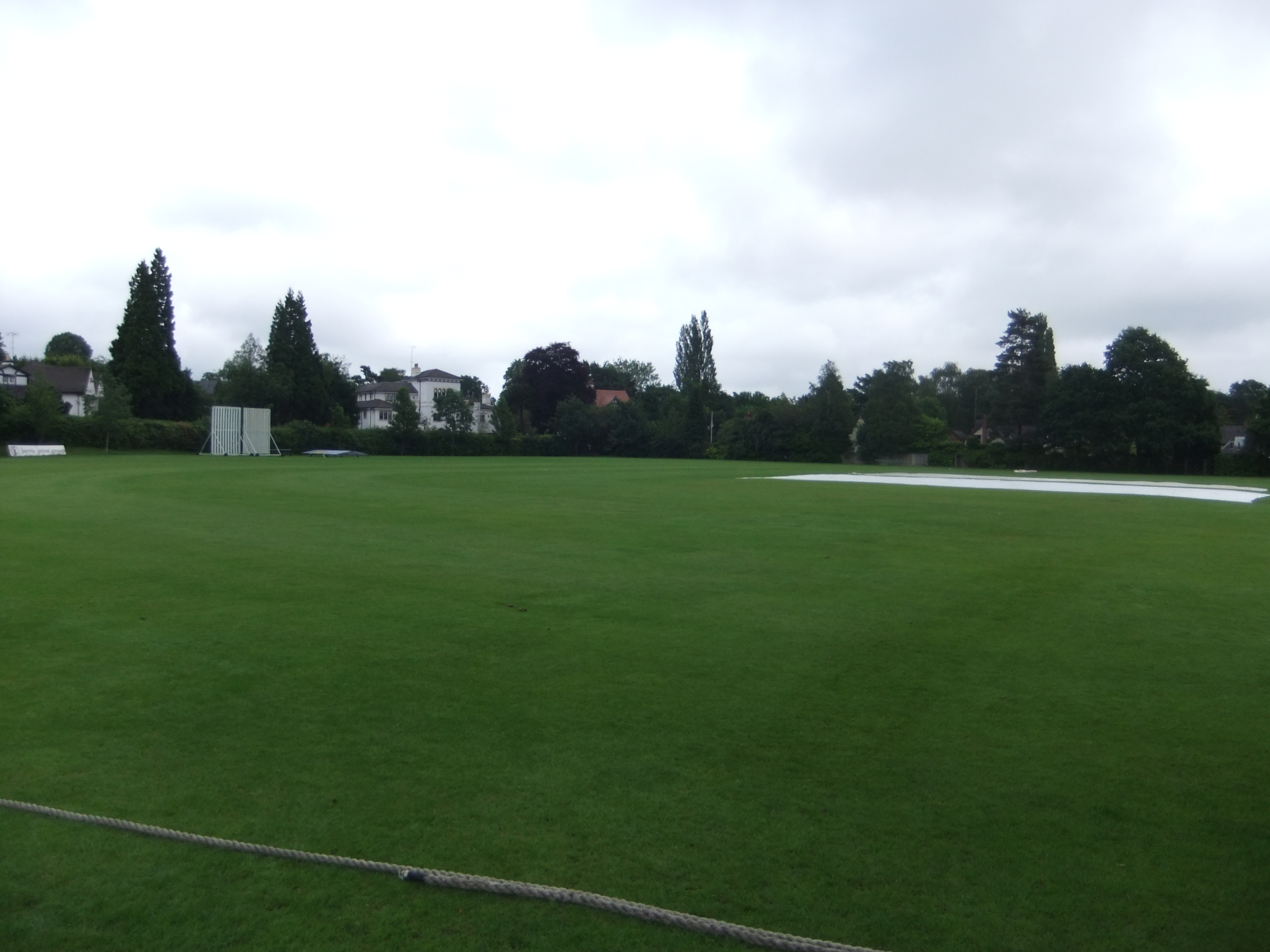
View of the ground looking east.

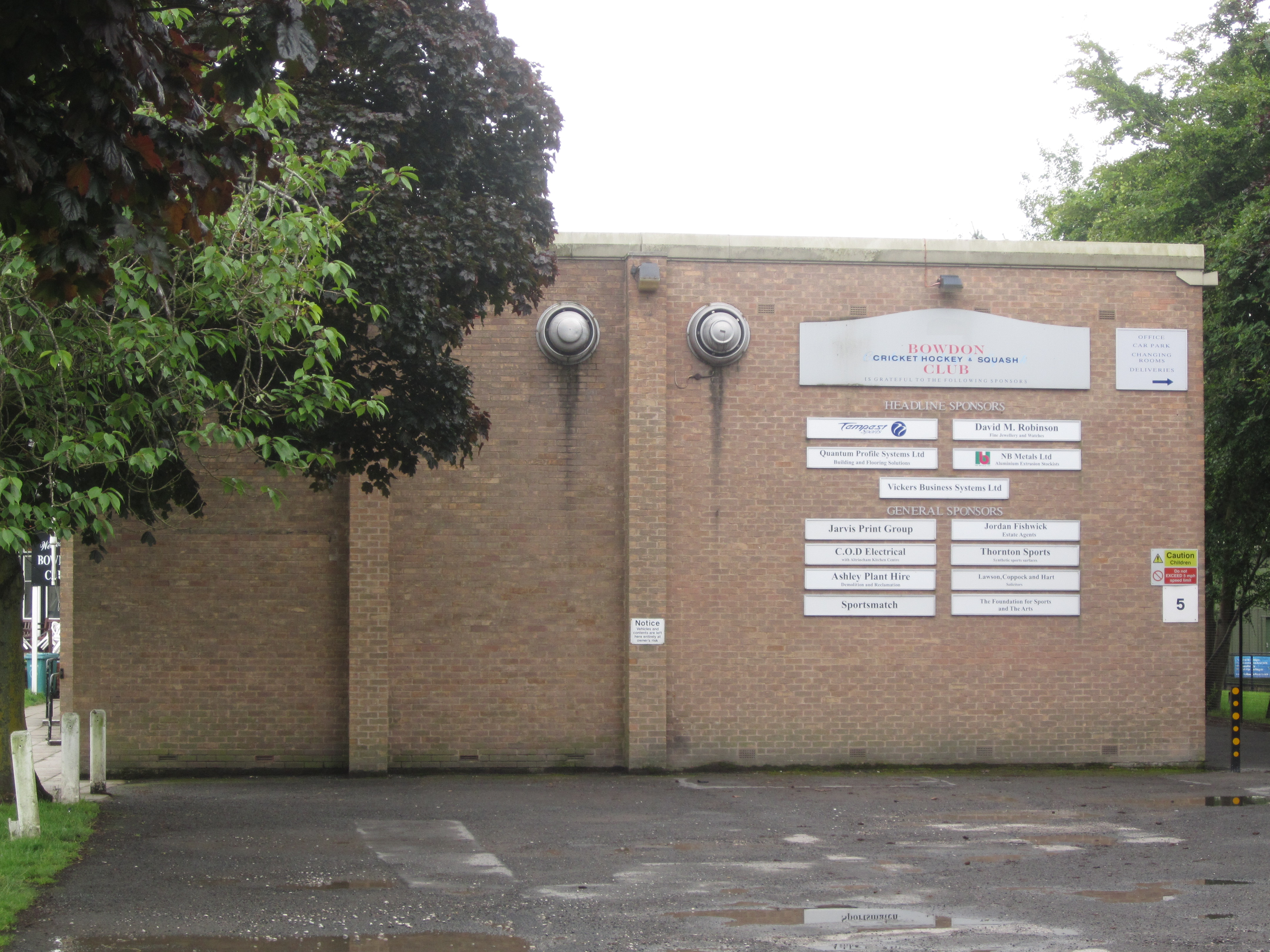
View of the squash club.

== See also ==
- List of cricket grounds in England and Wales
