= Lincolnshire Premier Cricket League =

Club cricket league in England

- Countries: England
- Administrator: ECB
- Format: Limited Overs
- First edition: 2026 (ECB Premier League)
- Tournament format: Cricket League
- Number of teams: 10 (Premier Division)
- Current champion: Bourne CC
- Website: Play Cricket Site

The Lincolnshire Premier Cricket League is the highest level of competition for club cricket in Lincolnshire, England.

Following a vote in November 2024, member clubs approved a proposal by Lincolnshire Cricket to merge three regional competitions into a unified, five-tier county pyramid. As a result, the Lincolnshire County Cricket League, the South Lincs & Border League, and the Lincolnshire ECB Premier League were dissolved at the conclusion of the 2025 season. The league's inaugural season began in April 2026 with a 10-team Premier Division at the top of the pyramid.

== Champions ==
- League Champions 2026-present
  Year	Club
  2026	Bourne

== Premier Division Performance by season from 2026-present ==
Key
Gold	Champions
Blue	Left League
Red	Relegated

Performance by season, from 2026
Club	2026	2027
Bourne	1	
Bracebridge Heath	5	
Burghley Park	4	
Grantham	10	
Grimsby Town	8	
Lindum	7	
Market Deeping		
Messingham		
Scunthorpe Town	2	
Sleaford	3	
Spalding	9	
Woodhall Spa	6	
References		
