= Nantwich Cricket Club =

English amateur cricket club

Nantwich Cricket Club is an English amateur cricket club, founded in 1848, and based at Whitehouse Lane in Nantwich, Cheshire. The club's first team plays in the Cheshire County Cricket League, one of the ECB Premier Leagues that are the highest level of the amateur, recreational sport in England and Wales. Nantwich won the Cheshire County Cricket League in 2010, 2011, 2012, 2018, 2021 and 2024.

== Recent history ==
In 2018 Nantwich became the Cheshire County League T20 champions. Nantwich then went on to the National stages, reaching the Finals day at Derbyshire, where they lost to Swardeston CC in the semi-finals.

In 2019, Nantwich reached the final of the ECB National Club Cricket Championship. In the final, played at Lord's, they again met Swardeston, and lost by 53 runs.

In 2020, Nantwich won the Cheshire Cup for the first time in their history beating Cheadle by 5 wickets.

== Notable players ==
Notable Nantwich players include Lancashire captain Liam Livingstone who played for the club from 2013 to 2016. In April 2015, Livingstone scored 350 off 138 balls, hitting 34 fours and 27 sixes in a National Club Championship match against Caldy, one of the highest one-day scores in history.

- Ian Cowap
- Liam Livingstone

== Ground ==
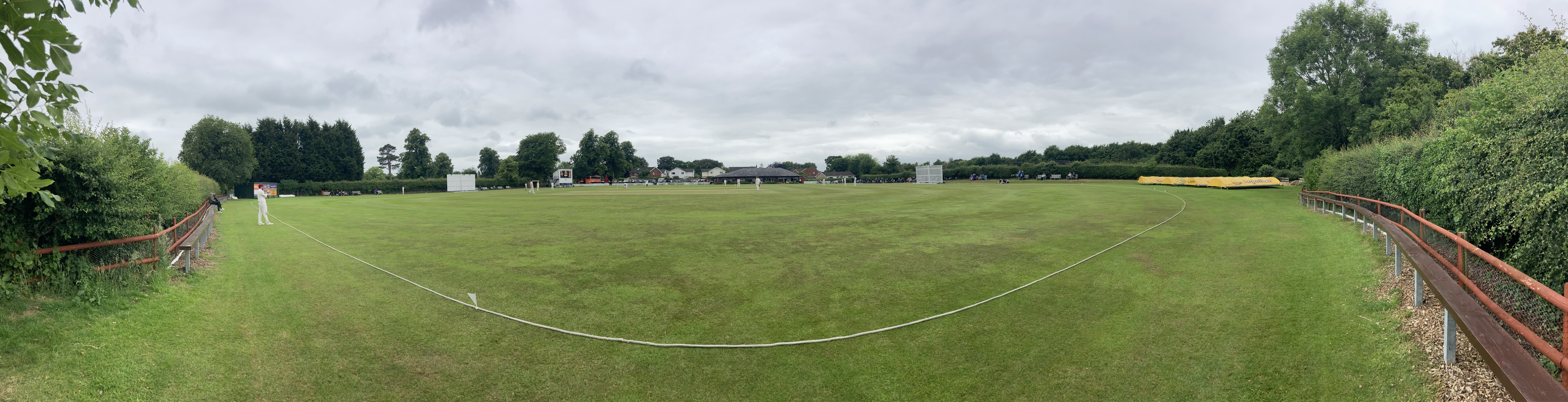
Nantwich CC taking on St Asaph CC in the 2022 ECB National Cup competition.

Nantwich's ground at Whitehouse Lane has hosted Minor Counties matches for Cheshire County Cricket Club.

== See also ==
- Nantwich CC website
