= Bradford Premier League =

Cricket league in West Yorkshire, England

- Countries: England
- Format: Semi-professional 50 over game
- First edition: 1903 (Founded); 2016 (ECB Premier League)
- Tournament format: Four divisions
- Number of teams: 48
- Current champion: Woodlands CC
- Most successful: Woodlands CC (11 titles)
- Most runs: Richard Robinson (16,352)
- Most wickets: David Batty (1,823)

The Bradford Premier League (currently known as the Gordon Rigg Bradford Premier League for sponsorship reasons) is a semi-professional cricket competition centred in Bradford, West Yorkshire. It has been described as "arguably England's strongest semi-professional competition."

The league is structured into four divisions. Many teams are from Bradford, with others from neighbouring towns and cities across West Yorkshire.

The league was renamed the Bradford Premier League in 2016, upon the merger of the Bradford Cricket League and the Central Yorkshire Cricket League, and since 2016 it has been a designated ECB Premier League. Since 2016, the winners qualify to take part in the Yorkshire Championship, together with the winners of the Yorkshire Premier League North and the Yorkshire Cricket Southern Premier League, and the leading Yorkshire club in the North Yorkshire and South Durham Cricket League. Hanging Heaton won the Yorkshire Championship in 2017, the only team from the Bradford League to do so thus far.

== History ==
The Bradford Cricket League was formed in 1903 with twelve clubs but only two (Undercliffe and Bankfoot) of the inaugural twelve are current members.

The first club to win the Bradford Cricket League was Shelf, in 1903, claiming their only League title. In total, the League has had twenty-six different winners of its top division. The most successful clubs are Bradford CC, Pudsey St Lawrence CC, and Woodlands CC, with ten titles each.

The turn of the century saw the domination of Pudsey Congs and Woodlands within the top division. Pudsey Congs won five consecutive titles between 2000 and 2004, and Woodlands won the following four titles.

In 2016, The Bradford Cricket League merged with the Central Yorkshire League to form the Bradford Premier League. Until then, the League had operated as two divisions, but this format was expanded to four divisions to accommodate the extra teams.

The League runs two cup competitions for the first and second teams of every club within the League. The first team competition is the Priestley Cup, which has been running since 1904, and the second team competition is the Priestley Shield, which has been running since 1913. Both the Cup and Shield are named for Sir William Priestley, who donated the presentation trophies for which the competitions are played.

The only club ever to have won the Cup three times in a row is East Bierley, who won in 1998, 1999 and 2000. However, the most successful club in the competition is Undercliffe, who have won it fourteen times.

== Structure ==
The League competition is made up of fixtures of fifty overs per side, with each team playing the others in their division both home and away. The strength of the League and its players is in part assisted by the League management having an open policy on the payment of players and no particular limit on the number of professional players in each game. However, teams are limited to one overseas player. In 2008 some first division sides have fielded as many as six players with professional (first-class) credentials.

There are certain playing restrictions that apply to all League fixtures. Bowlers are limited to bowling a maximum of fifteen overs per innings, the fielding side's innings must be bowled within 3 hours 10 minutes (failure to do so results in a points penalty), and the fielding side must have four fieldsmen plus the wicketkeeper and bowler within a 30-yard fielding circle at the moment of delivery (failure to do so results in a no-ball being called).

Points are awarded as follows: 10 points for a win, 5 points to each side for a tie (scores level), 0 points for a loss, 5 points to each side for abandonment (no play), and 5 points to each side for an abandonment (with play, no win achieved). For all results, bar an abandonment with no play, teams can gain an added maximum of five bonus batting points and five bonus bowling points. Batting points are awarded as 1 point for scoring 125 runs, with an extra 1 point for every further 25 runs (to a maximum of 5 points), and bowling points are awarded as 1 point for every 2 wickets taken. As thus, the maximum number of points that can be gained from a game is 20.

Spectators at first XI matches are often required to pay for entry and a programme. The League management has, from 2008, capped the maximum charge at £3, with concessions at £1.50. Second XI matches are capped at a maximum of 25p for adults and 10p for children. All gate receipts are kept by the home club.

== Winners ==
- Year	Champions
  1903	Shelf
  1904	Great Horton
  1905	Clayton
  1906	Great Horton
  1907	Undercliffe
  1908	Great Horton
  1909	Great Horton
  1910	Idle
  1911	Windhill
  1912	Bingley
  1913	Laisterdyke
  1914	Bradford
  1915	Bowling Old Lane
  1916	Idle
  1917	Saltaire
  1918	Saltaire
  1919	Keighley
  1920	Saltaire
  1921	Bingley
  1922	Saltaire
- Year	Champions
  1923	Bowling Old Lane
  1924	Bowling Old Lane
  1925	Undercliffe
  1926	Saltaire
  1927	Bradford
  1928	Bradford
  1929	Bradford
  1930	Brighouse
  1931	Brighouse
  1932	Brighouse
  1933	Bradford
  1934	Bradford
  1935	Undercliffe
  1936	Bradford
  1937	Windhill
  1938	Windhill
  1939	Windhill
  1940	Windhill
  1941	Windhill
  1942	Lidget Green
- Year	Champions
  1943	Saltaire
  1944	Spen Victoria
  1945	Undercliffe
  1946	Keighley
  1947	Salts
  1948	Windhill
  1949	Salts
  1950	Baildon
  1951	Baildon
  1952	Baildon
  1953	Salts
  1954	Salts
  1955	Bradford
  1956	Pudsey St Lawrence
  1957	Lidget Green
  1958	Bradford
  1959	Bingley
  1960	Brighouse
  1961	Salts
  1962	Farsley
- Year	Champions
  1963	Undercliffe
  1964	Lidget Green
  1965	Idle
  1966	Idle
  1967	Idle
  1968	Bradford
  1969	Bingley
  1970	Undercliffe
  1971	Undercliffe
  1972	Bankfoot
  1973	Bingley
  1974	Idle
  1975	Pudsey St Lawrence
  1976	Pudsey St Lawrence
  1977	Idle
  1978	Bowling Old Lane
  1979	Pudsey St Lawrence
  1980	Yorkshire Bank
  1981	East Bierley
  1982	Bingley
- Year	Champions
  1983	Yorkshire Bank
  1984	Pudsey St Lawrence
  1985	Pudsey St Lawrence
  1986	Undercliffe
  1987	Hanging Heaton
  1988	East Bierley
  1989	Hanging Heaton
  1990	Bradford and Bingley
  1991	Pudsey St Lawrence
  1992	Bradford and Bingley
  1993	East Bierley
  1994	East Bierley
  1995	Hanging Heaton
  1996	East Bierley
  1997	Undercliffe
  1998	Bradford and Bingley
  1999	Hanging Heaton
  2000	Pudsey Congs
  2001	Pudsey Congs
  2002	Pudsey Congs
- Year	Champions
  2003	Pudsey Congs
  2004	Pudsey Congs
  2005	Woodlands
  2006	Woodlands
  2007	Woodlands
  2008	Woodlands
  2009	Baildon
  2010	Pudsey Congs
  2011	Woodlands
  2012	Woodlands
  2013	Cleckheaton
  2014	Cleckheaton
  2015	Pudsey St Lawrence
  2016	Pudsey St Lawrence
  2017	Hanging Heaton
  2018	Pudsey St Lawrence
  2019	Woodlands
  2020	no competition
  2021	Woodlands
  2022	Woodlands
- Year	Champions
  2023	Woodlands
  2024	New Farnley
  2025	New Farnley
  2026	Woodlands

== Performance by season from 2016 ==
Key
Gold	Champions
Red	Relegated

Performance by season, from 2016
Club	2016	2017	2018	2019	2021	2022	2023	2024	2025	2026
Baildon									11	
Bankfoot						9	12			
Batley		11			10	12				
Bradford and Bingley	7	7	10	6	8	5	7	9	4	4
Carlton									6	9
Cleckheaton	6	9	7	9	9	11		10	9	7
East Bierley	10	10	11							
Farsley	3	3	6	7	6	6	4	8	7	11
Hanging Heaton	2	1	3	3	4	8	11			
Jer Lane							5	3	8	8
Lightcliffe	9	8	9	12						
Methley			5	8	7	10	10	5	5	6
Morley	11				11					10
New Farnley	4	5	2	5	3	2	2	1	1	3
Ossett						7	8	11		
Pudsey Congs	8	12					9	12		12
Pudsey St Lawrence	1	4	1	4	5	4	6	6	10	5
Scholes	12		12							
Townville		6	8	2	2	3	3	4	2	2
Undercliffe				11				7	12	
Woodlands	5	2	4	1	1	1	1	2	3	1
Wrenthorpe				10	12					
References										

== Notable players ==
Some of the more notable members include Leonard Hutton, who was a youngster at Pudsey St Lawrence and Jack Hobbs who played at Idle between 1915 and 1918. Notable overseas players include West Indian fast bowler Learie Constantine, Indian Test player VVS Laxman and Pakistan batsman Mohammad Yousuf.

The following Bradford League players have played international cricket:

Baildon

- Brian Close (England)
- Matthew Hoggard (England)
- Colin de Grandhomme (New Zealand)

Bankfoot

- Anthony McGrath (England)
- Derek Underwood (England)

Bowling Old Lane

- Mohammad Yousuf (Pakistan)
- Martyn Moxon (England)
- Darren Gough (England)
- Bill Athey (England)
- Doug Padgett (England)
- Frank Lowson (England)
- Harold Rhodes (England)

Bradford & Bingley

- Gareth Batty (England)
- Matthew Hoggard (England)
- Adil Rashid (England)

Brighouse

- George Hirst (England)
- Wilfred Rhodes (England)

Cleckheaton

- Yajurvindra Singh (India)
- Suru Nayak (India)
- Abey Kuruvilla (India)
- Ian Austin (England)
- Andrew Gale (England U19)
- Iain Wardlaw (Scotland)

East Bierley

- Edwin St Hill (West Indies)
- Collis King (West Indies)
- Les Taylor (England)
- Roy Gilchrist (West Indies)
- Nick Cook (England)
- Jack Birkenshaw (England)
- Gavin Hamilton (England/Scotland)

Esholt

- Lou Vincent (New Zealand)

Farsley

- Ray Illingworth (England)
- Brian Bolus (England)
- Craig White (England)
- Nathan Astle (New Zealand)
- Graham Roope (England)

Gomersal

- Tony Blain (New Zealand)

Great Horton

- Imran Nazir (Pakistan)

Hanging Heaton

- Abdul Qadir (Pakistan)
- Dilip Vengsarkar (India)
- Sameer Dighe (India)
- VVS Laxman (India)

Hartshead Moor

- Shahid Mahboob (Pakistan)
- Jacob Martin (India)
- Tim Bresnan (England)

Idle

- Jack Hobbs (England)
- Stewie Dempster (New Zealand)
- Dinusha Fernando (Sri Lanka)
- Ijaz Ahmed (Pakistan)
- Mohammad Hafeez (Pakistan)
- Doug Padgett (England)

Keighley

- Frank Woolley (England)
- Jack Hearne (England)
- Schofield Haigh (England)
- Eddie Paynter (England)
- Arthur Dolphin (England)

Lightcliffe

- Mohammed Kaif (India)

Manningham Mills

- Phil Sharpe (England)
- Mike Veletta (Australia)

Morley

- Bobby Peel (England)

Pudsey Congs

- Herbert Sutcliffe (England)
- Matthew Hoggard (England)
- Rana Naved-ul-Hasan (Pakistan)
- VVS Laxman (India)
- Paul Grayson (England)
- Chris Silverwood (England)
- Derek Randall (England)

Pudsey St Lawrence

- Leonard Hutton (England)
- Eddie Leadbeater (England)
- Steve Rhodes (England)
- Mark Greatbatch (New Zealand)
- Martin Crowe (New Zealand)
- Simon Doull (New Zealand)
- Chris Pringle (New Zealand)
- Anil Kumble (India)

Queensbury

- Haroon Rasheed (Pakistan)
- Rashid Khan (Pakistan)
- Rizwan-uz-Zaman (Pakistan)

Saltaire

- Sydney Barnes (England)
- Bill Voce (England)
- Tom Goddard (England)
- Jim Laker (England)
- Arthur Mitchell (England)

Spen Victoria

- George Pope (England)
- Edwin St Hill (West Indies)
- Iqbal Qasim (Pakistan)
- Mansoor Akhtar (Pakistan)
- Wasim Jaffer (India)
- Vinod Kambli (India)
- Rao Iftikhar Anjum (Pakistan)

Undercliffe

- Cec Parkin (England)
- Charles Llewellyn (South Africa)
- George Gunn (England)
- Vic Wilson (England)
- Les Jackson (England)
- Alan Ward (England)
- David Bairstow (England)
- Mohammad Imran Khan (Pakistan)
- Faheem Ashraf (Pakistan)
- Alex Wharf (England)

Windhill

- Lou Vincent (New Zealand)
- Charlie Parker (England)
- Les Ames (England)
- Amol Muzumdar (India)
- Learie Constantine (West Indies)

Yeadon

- Geoff Cope (England)
- Brian Close (England)
- Ted Peate (England)

In April 1999, Kathryn Leng became the first woman to play in the Bradford League, representing the former Yorkshire Bank club.

== See also ==
- Bradford League, the football equivalent
- Priestley Cup
