= North Marine Road Ground, Scarborough =

Cricket ground

Coordinates: 54°17′18″N 0°24′19″W

North Marine Road Ground
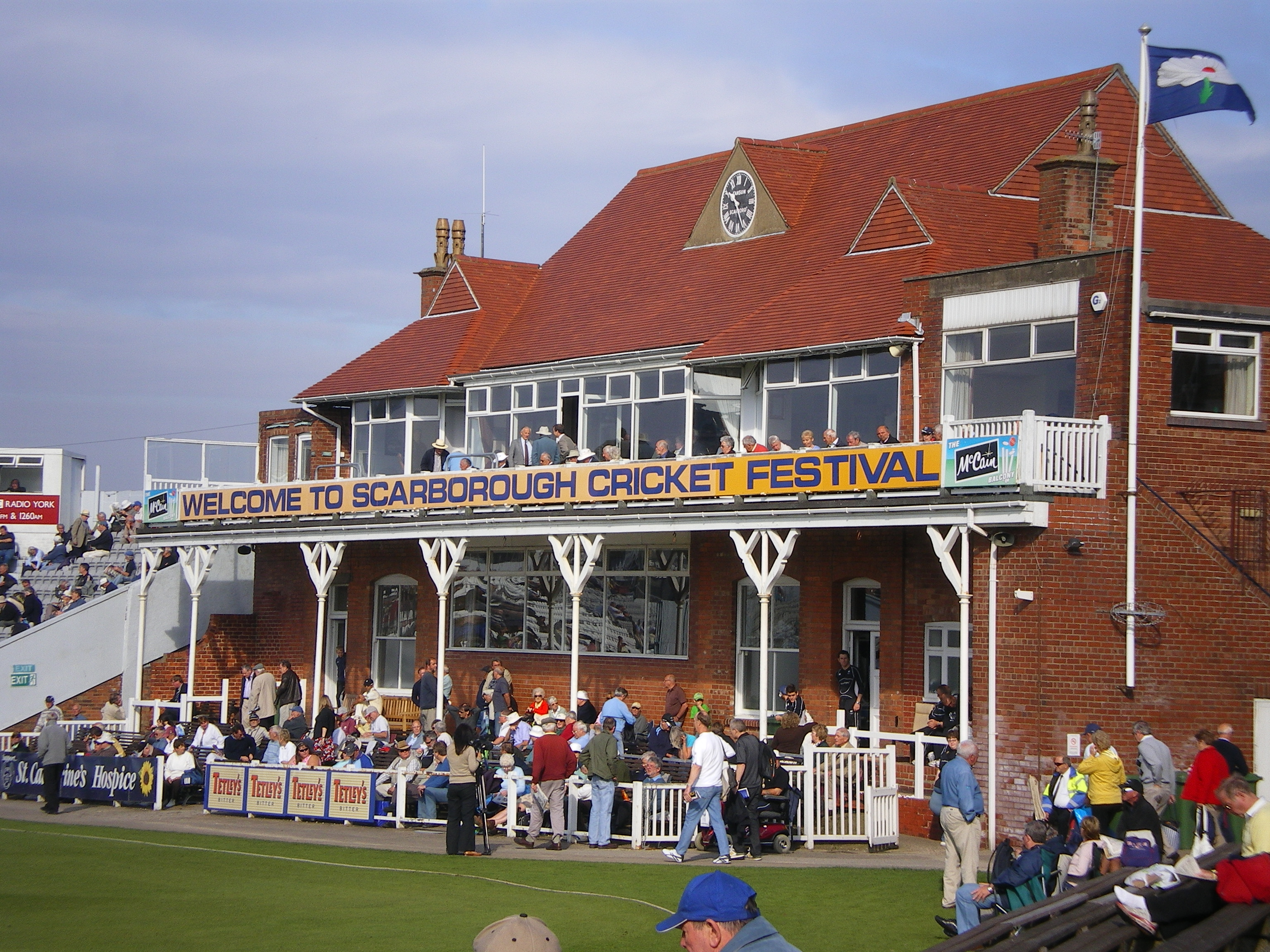
- North Marine Road pavilion
- Interactive map of North Marine Road Ground

Ground information
- Location: Scarborough, North Yorkshire, England
- Establishment: 1863
- Capacity: 9,000
- Owner: Scarborough Cricket Club
- Tenants: Scarborough CC, Yorkshire
- End names
- Peasholm Park End; Trafalgar Square End

International information
- First ODI: 26 August 1976: England v West Indies
- Last ODI: 15 July 1978: England v New Zealand
- First women's Test: 16–19 June 1951: England v Australia
- Last women's Test: 21–24 August 2004: England v New Zealand
- First WODI: 12 July 1998: England v Australia
- Last WODI: 23 August 2014: England v India

Team information
Scarborough Cricket Club	(1863–present)
Yorkshire	(1896–present)
- As of 28 April 2017; Source: Cricinfo

North Marine Road Ground, formerly known as Queen's, is a cricket ground in Scarborough, North Yorkshire, England. It is the home of Scarborough Cricket Club which hosts the Scarborough Festival and the Yorkshire County Cricket Club plays a series of fixtures in the second half of the season each year. The current capacity is 9,000, while its record attendance is the 22,946 who watched Yorkshire play Derbyshire in 1947. The two ‘ends’ are known as the Peasholm Park End and the Trafalgar Square End.

== History ==
Cricket was first staged at the ground in 1863, when tenancy of Jackson's field on North Marine Road was obtained, matches having been played at Castle Hill in Scarborough since 1849. Yorkshire has played there since 1878, when MCC beat Yorkshire by 7 wickets. The first County Championship game was held there in 1896, when Yorkshire beat Leicestershire by 162 runs. With the demise of the other 'out' grounds, Scarborough is now one of the two regular venues for county cricket in Yorkshire other than Headingley Cricket Ground, Leeds.

The end-of-season Scarborough Festival, staged to capitalise on the large numbers of Yorkshire tourists in the seaside resort, saw touring teams, county teams and Yorkshire play in a mixture of friendly, championship and one-day cricket. The Fenner Trophy, a one-day competition featuring four counties, ran from 1971 to 1996 under the names of various sponsors. The centenary of the festival was celebrated in 1986, with Sir Len Hutton as president.

== Conditions ==
The ground is known to have a fast-scoring outfield and a pitch which is often receptive to spin. The ground hosts Senior Premier League matches while ECB representative games, under-19 and Women's Test matches have also been held there in recent years.

== International venue ==
The ground has also staged two One Day Internationals, pitting England against the West Indies and New Zealand in 1976 and 1978. In 2005, Yorkshire signed a new deal with the ground authorities which ensured that the county would continue to play there until 2010. The ground is situated close to the sea and features a raised cricket pavilion built at a cost of £2,150 in 1895. A new seating enclosure was added in 1902 and further extended over the next five years. A concrete stand was added in 1926, at a cost of £6,700 and in 1956 a new West Stand was erected, costing £16,000. More recently, the Jack Knowles Building was completed in 1995 at a cost of £210,000, new all-weather nets and a press box were constructed in 1997 for £50,000 and the enclosure and tea rooms were refurbished in 1998 for £95,000.

After the 2010 county season The Guardian named North Marine Road their 'Ground of the Year'.

== Other games ==
At different stages of the club's history, the stadium has also contained a Velodrome, hosted athletics events, was the original home of Scarborough F.C. and, in more recent times, was a venue for Scarborough Hockey Club fixtures. The pavilion facilities are utilized throughout the year for a variety of functions.

== International centuries ==
A single ODI century has been scored at the venue.

No.	Score	Player	Team	Balls	Opposing team	Date	Result
1	119*	Vivian Richards	West Indies	133	England	26 August 1976	Won

== Gallery ==
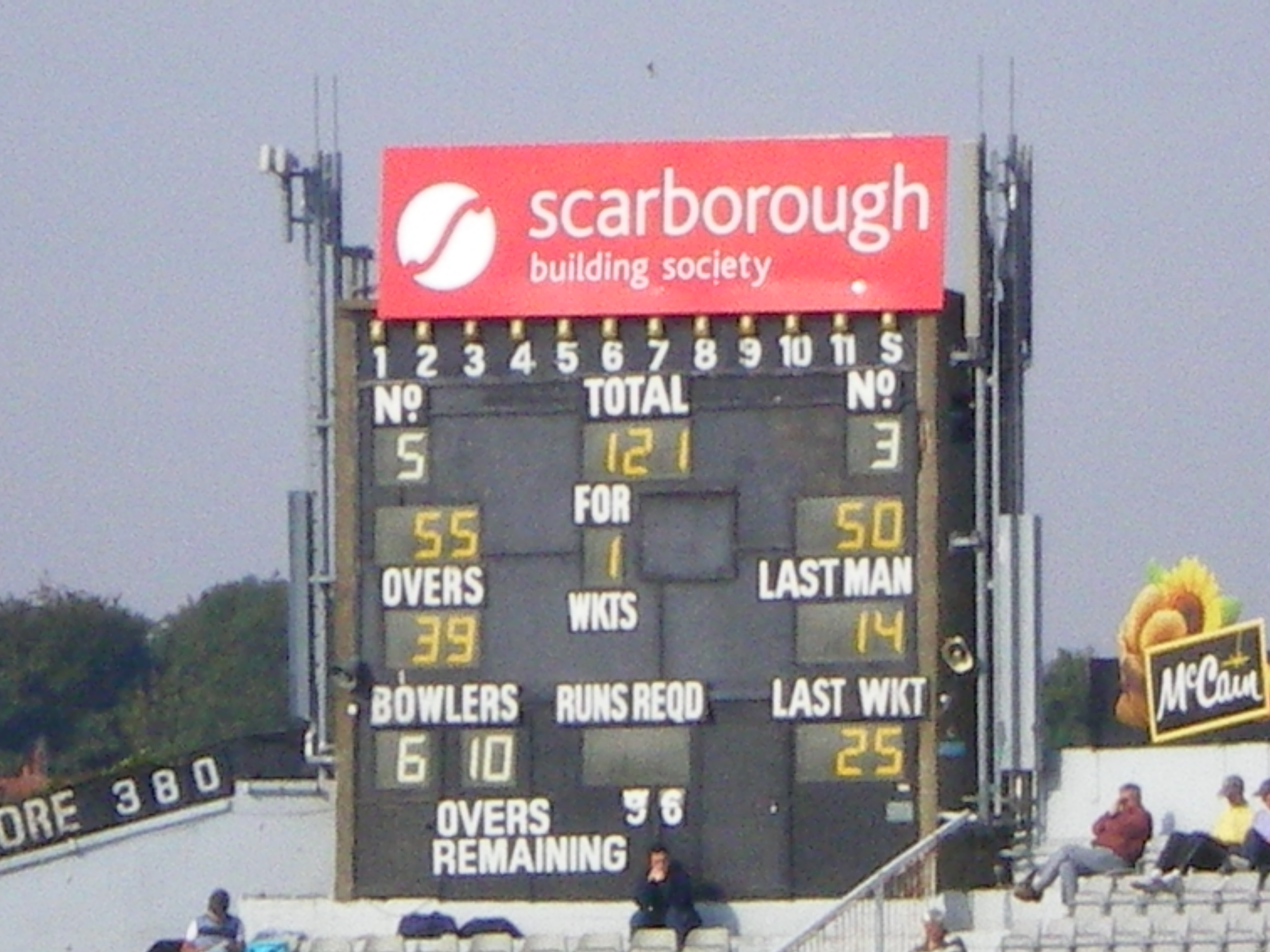
North Marine Road scoreboard

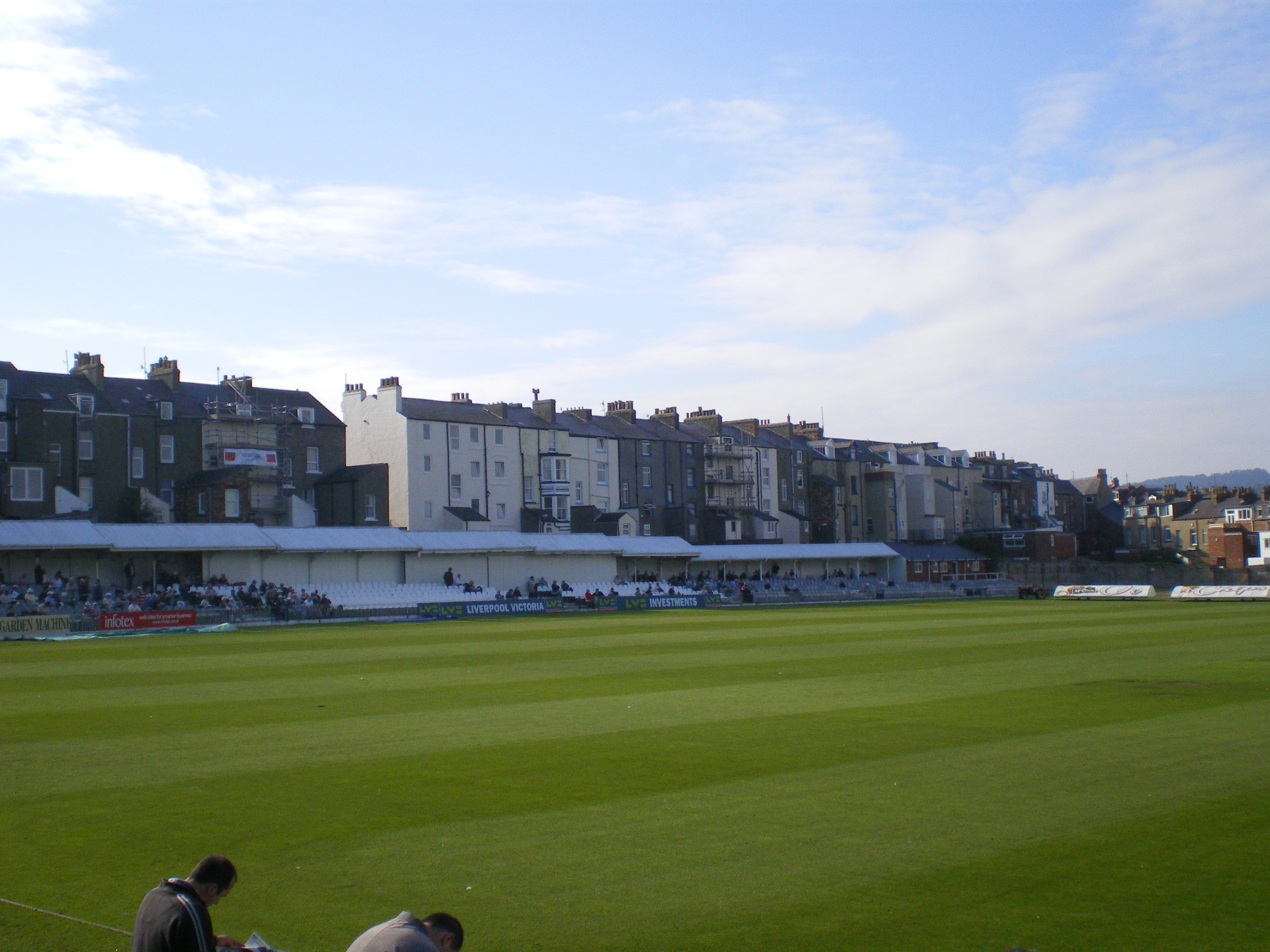
Trafalgar Square End

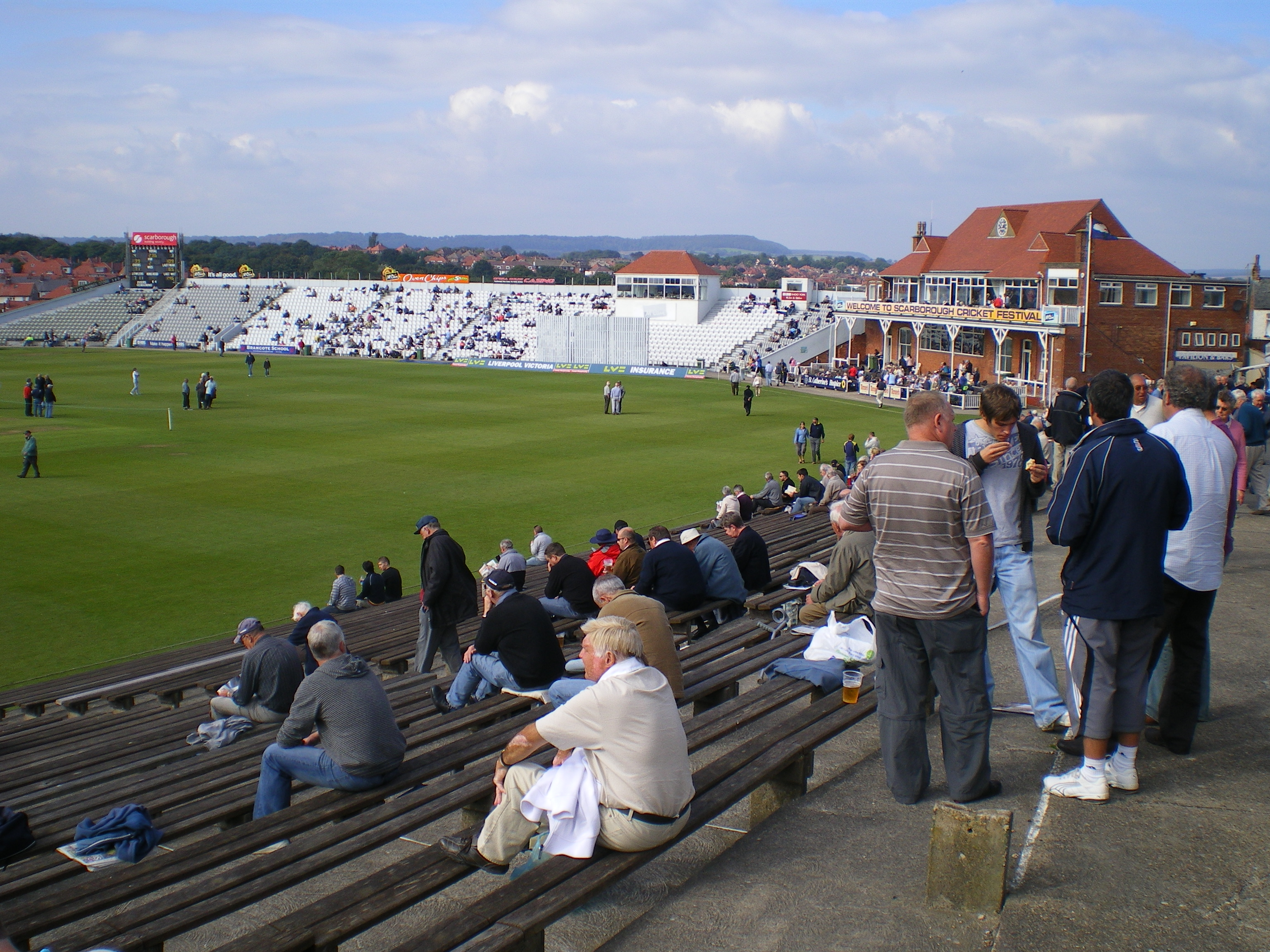
Peasholm Park End

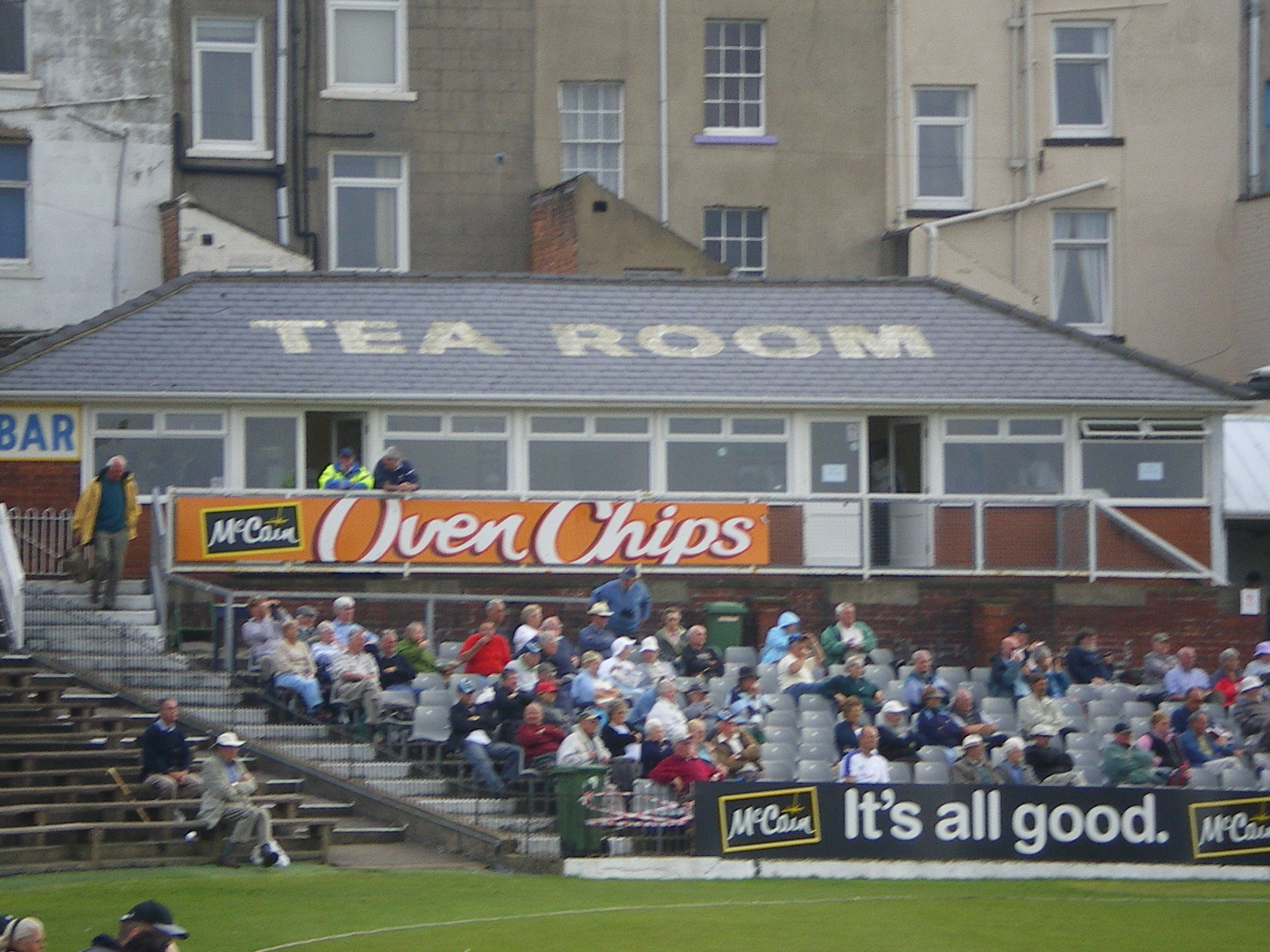
Tea Room enclosure
