= Mark Beardshall =

English cricketer (born 1962)

Mark Beardshall (born 10 January 1962 in Barnsley, Yorkshire, England) was an English cricketer. He was a right-handed batsman and a right-arm medium-pace bowler who played for Derbyshire in 1987.

Debuting in the Second XI Championship two years previously for Yorkshire, Beardshall soon moved to play for the Peakites, for whom he debuted with just short of a half-century in May 1987. He was promoted to the first team for the remainder of the 1987 season, making his debut first-class appearance against Hampshire, although he failed to hold his own in the first team and went back to play with the Second XI.

In the same year, he played in the Peakites' victorious 1987 Bane Dawes Trophy campaign, picking up four wickets against Hampshire. He was not to play first-class cricket again after 1987, and played in the Second XI for the last time in 1989, making a respectable final Second XI Championship appearance. Generally speaking, Beardshall was a tailend batsman, though his appearances at the bottom of the Derbyshire order were saved for those times when Devon Malcolm and Ole Mortensen were both in relatively good batting form.
