= Scarborough Beckett Cricket League =

Regional English Cricket League

- Countries: England
- Format: Limited overs cricket
- First edition: 1958 (Founded)
- Latest edition: 2024 (Amalgamated into the YPLN)
- Tournament format: League
- Number of teams: 10 (Premier Division)
- Current champion: Staxton CC (2024)
- Website: https://scarboroughbeckettlge.play-cricket.com

The Scarborough Beckett Cricket League, founded in 1958, is a Saturday League that administer's cricket clubs that participate in its League, Cup and Trophy competitions. The league headquarters is based in Scarborough, North Yorkshire.

The Scarborough Beckett Cricket League format is the result of an amalgamation with the Derwent Valley League in 2016. The league consists of 5 Divisions. The Premier Division contains a maximum of 12 teams, Divisions 1 to 3 hold 10 teams and Division 4 contains the remaining teams. Clubs participating in the league are mainly from eastern North Yorkshire, with some clubs from the northern border region of the East Riding of Yorkshire.

Since 2008, the Championship has fluctuated between four clubs, with Staithes Athletic winning 4 and Staxton 4 titles, until the emergence of Filey, achieving a double championship win in 2018 and 2019.

At the end of 2024, the Scarborough Beckett Cricket League and the remaining clubs in the York Vale Cricket League merged into the Yorkshire Premier League North, expanding its membership to 130 clubs. Committee members from both leagues joined its administration.

Scarborough Beckett Cricket League 2021.

== Winners ==
- Champions, 2008-2024
  Year	Club
  2008	Forge Valley
  2009	Staxton
  2010	Staithes Athletic Club
  2011	Heslerton
  2012	Staxton
  2013	Heslerton
  2014	Staxton
  2015	Staithes Athletic Club
  2016	Staithes Athletic Club
  2017	Staxton
  2018	Filey
  2019	Filey
  2020	League suspended
  2021	Staithes Athletic Club
  2022	Mulgrave
  2023	Ebberston
  2024	Staxton

== Performance by season from 2008 to 2024 ==
Key
Gold	Champions
Red	Relegated
Blue	Left League

Performance by season, from 2008 to 2024.
Club	2008	2009	2010	2011	2012	2013	2014	2015	2016	2017	2018	2019	2020	2021	2022	2023	2024
Bridlington														8	12		
Brompton												7		6	10	7	?
Cayton	7	9		7	3	8	6	2	8	9	7	4		4	3	4	?
Cloughton	4	3	5	10		9				12				11			?
Ebberston	2	2	3	2	2	7	4	4	10	7	4	10		3	2	1	?
Filey				5	10		9	7	6	3	1	1		5	6		
Flamborough			9		7												
Flixton II	9	7	10		8	6	8	10	11								
Folkton & Flixton															8	9	
Foords		8	8														
Forge Valley	1	6	4	8	6	3	3	8	7	5	12						
Great Habton																8	?
Heslerton				1	4	1	2	5	9	4	9	12			7	10	
Kirkbymoorside		5	6	9		5	7										
Mulgrave									10		10	3		9	1	2	3
Nawton Grange	10							6	5	10	5	5					
Scalby								9	3	8	8	6		2	5	5	?
Seamer & Irton			7	6	9		10		4	6	6	9		7	11		2
Settrington										11		11					
Sherburn	8	10															?
Staithes Athletic Club	5	4	1	4	5	4	5	1	1	2	3	2	6	1	4	6	?
Staxton	3	1	2	3	1	2	1	3	2	1	2	8		10	9	3	1
Thornton Dale											11						
Whitby	6																
Wykeham																	4
References													(Note: Due to the Coronavirus pandemic an ad-hoc interim league was set up during the late summer of 2020.)				
