= Pudsey St Lawrence Cricket Club =

UK cricket team

Pudsey St Lawrence is a cricket club in Pudsey, West Yorkshire. Formed in 1845 the club now plays in the Bradford Cricket League.

Members of the Bradford league since 1912, the club took until 1956 to win the league title.

The club won the Priestley Cup in 2011 and 2014. They also won the Bradford League Premier Division title in 2015 and 2016 and this distinguished club are continually challenging for honours at all senior and junior levels in the game.

The club secured their third title in four years on 8 September 2018, holding off a concerted challenge by New Farnley in an enthralling end to the campaign

== Famous players ==
The league has always attracted many players who have gone on to become internationals. In the case of Pudsey St Lawrence the list has included famous names such as the England players Sir Len Hutton, Herbert Sutcliffe and more recently Steve Rhodes. A number of New Zealand internationals such as Mark Greatbatch and Martin Crowe have also spent time with the club.

== Popularity ==
The club fields four senior teams in addition to the first team and four junior teams. It also provides coaching for both boys and girls from age seven and up.
