= Ian Cowap =

English cricketer

Ian Cowap (10 June 1950 – 10 February 2016) was an English cricketer. He was a right-handed batsman and right-arm medium-pace bowler who played for Cheshire.

He was born in Nantwich, Cheshire and attended Nantwich and Acton Grammar School; he played for Nantwich Cricket Club and for Betley, and also had a spell as professional at Bradshaw in the Bolton Cricket League.

Cowap, who represented Cheshire 60 times in the Minor Counties Championship between 1974 and 1983, made a single List A appearance for the team, during the 1981 NatWest Trophy, against Hampshire. From the lower-middle order, he scored a duck.

Cowap died of cancer at the age of 65 on 10 February 2016.
