= Cheshire County Cricket League =

ECB Premier League

- Countries: England
- Administrator: Cheshire Cricket Board
- Format: Limited Overs
- First edition: 1975
- Tournament format: League
- Number of teams: 48 - 12(Premier Division) 12(Div 1), 12 (Div 2), 12 (div 3)
- Current champion: Cheadle CC
- Most successful: Bowdon CC (10)
- Website: cheshirecountycl.org.uk

The Cheshire County Cricket League is a cricket league based in England. It is the top level of competition for recreational club cricket in the Cheshire area and is a designated ECB Premier League.

The league was founded in 1975, and the twelve founder member clubs were Alderley Edge, Bowdon, Bramhall, Brooklands, Cheadle, Cheadle Hulme, Heaton Mersey, Macclesfield, Marple, Northwich, Warrington, and Winnington Park. The clubs were divided into two divisions in 1995, by which time there were 24 clubs in membership, and since 1999 they have been divided into three divisions. Stockport Georgians and Ashton on Mersey were admitted to the league prior to the 1999 season. The league became an ECB Premier League in 1999.

The clubs competing in the 1st XI Premier Division for 2020 were intended to be: Alderley Edge, Cheadle, Chester Boughton Hall, Didsbury, Hyde, Nantwich, Neston, Oulton Park, Oxton, Timperley, Toft, and Widnes. The 2020 competition was cancelled due to the COVID-19 pandemic. A replacement competition was organised for the later part of the season when cricket again became possible, but with the winners not to be regarded as official league champions.

== League structure ==
The Cheshire County Cricket League covers the historic county of Cheshire, which includes the unitary authorities of Cheshire West and Chester, Cheshire East, Warrington Borough Council and the Borough of Halton, and the Metropolitan Borough of Stockport. It is the top tier of the pyramid structure of leagues in the area.

The league for 1st XI teams has a Premier and three lower divisions. There are currently 12 teams in each division. Along with the 1st XI divisions, the Cheshire County Cricket League runs concurrent leagues for 2nd and 3rd XIs. The 2nd league is a duplicate 1st XI league with 12 teams per division. The 3rd XI league plays ten teams per division. It has a premier division, and divisions 1 and 2; but below that the teams play within their geographical county areas as 3rd XI Division 3 West and 3rd XI Division 3 East. A 3rd XI Division 4 is also offered to clubs in the Greater Manchester region with additional XIs.

1st XI ECB Premier League (12 teams)
1st XI Division 1 (12 teams)
1st XI Division 2 (12 teams)
1st XI Division 3 (12 teams)
1st XI Division 1 Cheshire Cricket league

2nd XI Premier League (12 teams)	3rd XI Premier League (10 teams)
2nd XI Division 1 (12 teams)	3rd XI Division 1 (10 teams)
2nd XI Division 2 (12 teams)	3rd XI Division 2 (10 teams)
2nd XI Division 3 (12 teams)	3rd XI Premier Division (10 teams)
3rd XI Division 3 West (10 teams)	3rd XI Division 3 East (10 teams)
3rd XI Division 4 (Greater Manchester Only) (10 teams)

Clubs play in the Cheshire County Cricket League based on the performances of their 1st XIs. The 1st XI Premier Division relegates two clubs and get two promoted clubs from the 1st XI Division 1 every season. This two up, two down format is replicated throughout the County League. The bottom two clubs in 1st XI Division 3 are relegated from the County League to the 1st XI Division 1 of the Cheshire Cricket League, they are replaced with the two top promoted clubs from this feeder league.

== Champions ==
- Year	Champions
  1975	Alderley Edge
  1976	Bowdon
  1977	Cheadle Hulme
  1978	Cheadle Hulme
  1979	Brooklands
  1980	Cheadle Hulme
  1981	Cheadle Hulme
  1982	Cheadle Hulme
  1983	Alderley Edge and Bowdon*
  1984	Cheadle Hulme
  1985	Warrington
  1986	Heaton Mersey
  1987	Marple
  1988	Bramhall
  1989	Bowdon
  1990	Cheadle Hulme
  1991	Toft
  1992	Macclesfield
  1993	Macclesfield
  1994	Widnes
- Year	Champions
  1995	Poynton
  1996	Bowdon
  1997	Bowdon
  1998	Bowdon
  1999	Macclesfield
  2000	Bowdon
  2001	Didsbury
  2002	Bowdon
  2003	Bowdon
  2004	Bowdon
  2005	Oulton Park
  2006	Oulton Park
  2007	Oulton Park
  2008	Alderley Edge
  2009	Oulton Park
  2010	Nantwich
  2011	Nantwich
  2012	Nantwich
  2013	Chester Boughton Hall
  2014	Hyde
- Year	Champions
  2015	Hyde
  2016	Alderley Edge
  2017	Chester Boughton Hall
  2018	Nantwich
  2019	Chester Boughton Hall
  2020	League suspended
  2021	Nantwich
  2022	Didsbury
  2023	Alderley Edge
  2024	Nantwich
  2025	Didsbury
  2026	Cheadle
- * – denotes a shared title

== Premier seasons since 1999 ==
Key
Gold	Champions
Red	Relegated

Performance by season, from 1999
Club	1999	2000	2001	2002	2003	2004	2005	2006	2007	2008	2009	2010	2011	2012	2013	2014	2015	2016	2017	2018	2019	2020	2021	2022	2023	2024	2025	2026
Alderley Edge			5	7	4	10	9	7	6	1	4	4	10	7	4	6	4	1	3	6	5		5	3	1	6	4	9
Alsager	?	11																										
Birkenhead Park		12						11																				
Bowdon	?	1	2	1	1	1	2	5	5	2	2	11			7	10	6	2	12					12		9	12	
Bramhall				5	12			10	12			12				4	9	7	8	11								11
Brooklands	?																								12		6	12
Cheadle																	8	6	10	7	8		12		14			1
Cheadle Hulme	?	10	10	12																								
Chester Boughton Hall	?	5	6	8	5	4	12		9	6	8	7	2	3	1	2	5	4	1	2	1		3	5	4	4	8	6
Christleton							3	4	11																			
Didsbury	?	8	1	6	10	12					7	10	8	8	11				7	12			2	1	2	3	1	3
Grappenhall				11									11		6	7	12		9	10	12				9			
Heaton Mersey										12																11		
Hyde	?	7	7	3	7	3	6	2	3	4	6	2	3	2	3	1	1	3	11		6		8	2	3	2	3	4
Lindow																											7	5
Macclesfield	1	2	9	2	9	11				10	12		5	4	12		7	11										
Marple														5	10	9	11			9	11							
Nantwich		6	8	9	2	9	7	6	8	3	3	1	1	1	9	8	2	10	2	1	4		1	4	6	1	2	2
Neston	?	9	3	10	6	8	5	8	2	7	5	3	9	9	2	5	10	5	5	4	2		9	7	8	10	9	10
Oulton Park			4	4	3	2	1	1	1	5	1	5	12							8	9		4	11				
Oxton	?	4	12		8	5	8	12			9	6	4	6	5	12							7	6	7	5	10	8
Poynton						7	11																					
Timperley																		9	6	3	3		11			8	5	7
Toft	?	3	11				10	9	7	9	10	9	7	10	8	3	3	8	4	5	10		10	10	10	12		
Urmston					11				4	11		8	6	11		11		12										
Widnes	?					6	4	3	10	8	11			12							7		6	8	5	7	11	
References																						(Note: Coronavirus pandemic forced a reduction in league activity.)						
