= Yorkshire Premier League North =

ECB Premier League

- Countries: England
- Administrator: ECB
- Format: Limited overs
- First edition: 2016
- Tournament format: League
- Number of teams: 12 (ECB Premier Division)
- Current champion: Clifton Alliance CC
- Most successful: Castleford CC (3 titles)
- Website: https://yplncricket.co.uk

The Yorkshire Premier League North was formed in early 2016 following the re-structure of club cricket within Yorkshire, and is an ECB Premier League. Of the initial twelve competing teams, six were from the now disbanded Yorkshire ECB County Premier League - Castleford, Driffield Town, Harrogate, Hull, York, and Yorkshire CCC Academy. The other six teams were from the York & District Senior Cricket League - Acomb, Dunnington, Scarborough, Sheriff Hutton Bridge, Stamford Bridge, and Woodhouse Grange. The League headquarters is based in Sowerby, Thirsk.

A process of promotion and relegation is in operation. Originally, the bottom two teams each season were replaced by the top two teams from the York & District Senior Cricket League. In 2022 the Yorkshire Premier League North formed a second division of its own, and in 2023 this division was separated into Championship East and Championship West divisions, with the winner of each eligible for promotion. A 50 over knockout competition is also competed for in conjunction with the Yorkshire Cricket Southern Premier League. Teams also compete in a T20 tournament, and there is also an U19 T20 for younger players.

The league winners qualify to take part in the Yorkshire Championship, together with the winners of the Bradford Premier League and the Yorkshire Cricket Southern Premier League, and the leading Yorkshire club in the North Yorkshire and South Durham Cricket League.

== Winners ==
Champions 2016–present
Year	Club
2016	Harrogate
2017	York
2018	York
2019	Sheriff Hutton Bridge
2020	no competition
2021	Castleford
2022	Driffield
2023	Castleford
2024	Clifton Alliance
2025	Castleford
2026	Clifton Alliance

== Performance by season from 2016 ==
Key
Gold	Champions
Red	Relegated
Blue	Left League

Performance by season, from 2016
Club	2016	2017	2018	2019	2021	2022	2023	2024	2025	2026
Acomb	8	9	12		9	11				
Beverley Town				12		10	11		10	9
Carlton Towers										12
Castleford	11		8	6	1	5	1	2	1	5
Clifton Alliance		10	10	8	5	6	6	1	8	1
Driffield Town	5	7	11		10	1	3	7	4	7
Dunnington	12			5	7					
Easingwold		12						12		
Harrogate	1	4	7	10	11	8	5	4	6	6
Hull	6	11								
Hull Zingari								9	9	11
Knaresborough									7	8
Malton and Old Malton							12			
Scarborough	10	8	6	9	3	7	10	8		
Sessay			9	11		9	9	10	11	
Sheriff Hutton Bridge	4	5	4	1	6	4	7	6	2	4
Stamford Bridge	7	2	3	4	12		8	11		10
Woodhouse Grange	9	6	2	2	4	3	4	5	5	3
York	2	1	1	3	8	2	2	3	3	2
Yorkshire Academy	3	3	5	7	2					
References										
