= Philip Hart (cricketer) =

English cricketer

Philip Richard Hart (12 January 1947, Seamer, Scarborough, Yorkshire, England) is an English first-class cricketer, who played three matches for Yorkshire County Cricket Club in July 1981, replacing the absent Phil Carrick. He made his debut, at the age of 34, against Surrey, Glamorgan and Nottinghamshire.

A slow left arm bowler, Hart took two wickets at 70, and scored 23 runs at 4.60, with a best first-class score of 11. Martyn Moxon, the former Yorkshire and England batsman who played alongside him, is his brother in law.
