= Yorkshire Cricket Southern Premier League =

ECB Premier League

- Countries: England
- Administrator: ECB
- Format: Limited overs
- First edition: 2016
- Tournament format: League
- Number of teams: 12 (ECB Premier Division)
- Current champion: Sheffield Collegiate CC
- Most successful: Wakefield Thornes CC (3 titles)
- Website: https://www.ycspl.co.uk

The Yorkshire Cricket Southern Premier League, known until 2020 as the Yorkshire South Premier League, was formed in early 2016, as part of the restructuring of club cricket in Yorkshire, and is an ECB Premier League. Of the twelve initial teams competing, seven came from the now disbanded Yorkshire ECB County Premier League (Appleby Frodingham, Barnsley, Cleethorpes, Doncaster Town, Rotherham Town, Sheffield and Phoenix United, and Sheffield Collegiate), four from the South Yorkshire Premier League (Aston Hall, Treeton, Whitley Hall and Wickersley Old Village) and one from the Central Yorkshire League (Wakefield Thornes). The League headquarters is based in Bircotes, Doncaster.

A process of promotion and relegation is in operation. Originally the bottom two teams each season were replaced by the top two teams from the South Yorkshire Championship, formerly South Yorkshire Premier League. The South Yorkshire Championship amalgamed with the Yorkshire Cricket Southern Premier League in time for the 2021 season.

The league winners qualify to take part in the Yorkshire Championship, together with the winners of the Bradford Premier League and the Yorkshire Premier League North, and the leading Yorkshire club in the North Yorkshire and South Durham Cricket League.

== Winners ==
Year	Champions
2016	Wakefield Thornes
2017	Wakefield Thornes
2018	Wakefield Thornes
2019	Doncaster Town
2020	no competition
2021	Appleby Frodingham
2022	Appleby Frodingham
2023	Sheffield Collegiate
2024	Cleethorpes
2025	Cleethorpes
2026	Sheffield Collegiate

== Overall Performance ==
Key
Gold	Champions
Red	Relegated
Blue	Left League

Performance by season, from 2016
Club	2016	2017	2018	2019	2021	2022	2023	2024	2025	2026
Appleby Frodingham	2	5	11		1	1	4	5	6	9
Aston Hall	7	10	7	12			11			
Barnsley (Note: Barnsley entered into a merger after the 2016 season and became Barnsley Woolley Miners.)	8									
Barnsley Woolley Miners		8	3	7	5	4	3	7	12	
Cawthorne					10	11		8	8	7
Cleethorpes	6	9	6	11		10	7	1	1	2
Doncaster Town	11		5	1	9	8	6	4	7	6
Elsecar				8	6	9	10	12		
Hallam		7	8	10	11		12		10	11
Rotherham Town	12									
Sheffield and Phoenix United	9	12								
Sheffield Collegiate	5	2	2	4	2	5	1	6	4	1
Shiregreen								9	11	
Sprotbrough										10
Tickhill		11		5	8	2	2	3	5	4
Treeton	10	4	4	3	3	7	9	11		
Wakefield Thornes	1	1	1	2	4	3	5	2	3	5
Whiston Parish Church			12			12				12
Whitley Hall	3	3	10	6	7	6	8	10	2	3
Wickersley Old Village	4	6	9	9	12				9	8
References										
