= North Yorkshire and South Durham Cricket League =

EBC Premier League

North Yorkshire and South Durham CrickeLeague
- Countries: England
- Administrator: ECB
- Format: Limited Overs
- First edition: 1892 (Founded); 2012 (ECB Premier League)
- Tournament format: League
- Number of teams: 12 (ECB Premier Division)
- Current champion: Richmondshire CC
- Most successful: Darlington CC (22)
- Website: https://nysdl.play-cricket.com

The North Yorkshire and South Durham Cricket League, commonly abbreviated to NYSD, is the top-level competition for recreational club cricket in the north of Yorkshire and south of Durham, England. The league was founded as long ago as 1892, the first competition was held in the following year.

Since 2012 the league has been a designated ECB Premier League, and the league champions qualify to take part in the Yorkshire Championship, together with the winners of the Bradford Premier League, Yorkshire Premier League North, Yorkshire Cricket Southern Premier League and Huddersfield Premier Cricket League.

The league chose to play an official, if shortened, competition after most ECB Premier Leagues formally cancelled the 2020 season due to the COVID-19 pandemic.

It is a successful league in the country, in national inter-league competitive cricket, having won the LCC National inter-league competition (latterly known as the Presidents Trophy) on no fewer than 12 occasions. The League hold the record for the longest sequence of consecutive titles (7 from 1988 to 1994) and the longest sequence of consecutive victories (36). Within that competition they hold the record for the highest total recorded (425–6 in 45 overs v the NEPL at Marske in 2010). In 2018 Richmondshire Cricket Club won the ECB National Club Championship.

== League members ==
- Yorkshire: Bedale, East Harsley, Great Ayton, Guisborough, Maltby, Marske, Marton, Middlesbrough, Normanby Hall, Northallerton, Redcar, Richmondshire, Saltburn, Skelton Castle, Stokesley, Thornaby, Whitby and Yarm
- County Durham: Barnard Castle, Billingham Synthonia, Bishop Auckland, Blackhall, Darlington, Darlington Railway Athletic, Hartlepool, Newton Aycliffe, Norton, Preston, Rockliffe Park, Seaton Carew, Sedgefield, Shildon Railway, Stockton and Wolviston

== Winners ==
#	Club	Years by century		
#	Club	19th	20th	21st
22	Darlington	1896	1904, 1906, 1920, 1921, 1922, 1923, 1925, 1926, 1930, 1941, 1950, 1953, 1954, 1955, 1958, 1962, 1977, 1985, 1987, 1990	2014
17	Guisborough	1895	1905, 1907, 1909, 1910, 1911, 1912, 1942, 1972, 1976, 1981, 1989, 1996	2001, 2002, 2003, 2004
12	Middlesbrough		1919, 1957, 1959, 1960, 1961, 1970, 1993, 1994	2007, 2008, 2010, 2022
11	Norton	1898	1902, 1903, 1914, 1935, 1937, 1938, 1946, 1949, 1951, 1998	
10	Hartlepool	1899	1900, 1901, 1908, 1913, 1928, 1964 (as West Hartlepool), 1978, 1982, 1988 (as Hartlepool)	
8	Redcar	1894	1924, 1927, 1931, 1952, 1965, 1991, 1992	
9	Richmondshire		1995	2012, 2013, 2015, 2019, 2020, 2021, 2024, 2026
8	Saltburn		1967, 1968, 1969, 1974, 1979	2000, 2005, 2023
5	Bishop Auckland		1934, 1966, 1973, 1980, 1999	
5	Normanby Hall		1940, 1947, 1956, 1963, 1997	
3	Barnard Castle			2016, 2018, 2025
3	Blackhall		1933, 1936, 1939	
3	Darlington Railway Athletic		1929, 1932, 1944	
3	Stockton	1897	1948, 1975	
3	Thornaby		1943, 1945, 1986	
2	Great Ayton			2006, 2017
2	Marske		1971, 1984	
2	Marton			2009, 2011
1	Billingham Synthonia		1983	
1	Constable Burton	Inaugural		

=== Premier division since ECB Premier League status ===
Key
Gold	Champions
Blue	Left League
Red	Relegated

Performance by season, from 2012
Club	2012	2013	2014	2015	2016	2017	2018	2019	2020	2021	2022	2023	2024	2025	2026
Barnard Castle	8	8	5	4	1	3	1	3	7	2	3	4	6	1	2
Billingham Synthonia	14				13			6	9	3	12				
Bishop Auckland							12					9	9	10	9
Darlington	2	2	1	8	3	8	5	11			4	6	11		10
Darlington Railway Athletic												10	10	8	3
Great Ayton	3	4	4	2	2	1	2	9	6	10	6	12		11	
Guisborough	7	5	6	9	8	11									
Hartlepool	9	7	7	6	9	10	8	8	3	4	5	3	3	4	5
Marske	13		12	5	4	6	11	4	10	12					12
Marton	5	3	8	13		4	7	2	4	7	11		5	2	8
Middlesbrough	4	6	11	7	7	7	10	10	2	9	1	5	8	7	7
Normanby Hall	10	13		10	12				12	11			12		
Norton				11	10	12								12	
Redcar		9	10	14											
Richmondshire	1	1	2	1	5	2	3	1	1	1	2	2	1	3	1
Saltburn		10	13						5	5	10	1	4	9	11
Seaton Carew			9	12	6	9	9	12							
Sedgefield	12	12	14												
Stockton											9	8	2	6	4
Stokesley	6	11	3	3	11	5	4	7	11	6	8	7	7	5	6
Thornaby	11	14					6	5	8	8	7	11			
References									(Note: Coronavirus pandemic forced a reduction in league activity.)						
