= ECB Premier Leagues =

Regional cricket leagues in England and Wales

The ECB Premier Leagues are a series of regional cricket leagues organised by the England and Wales Cricket Board (ECB) that form the top tier of club cricket in England and Wales. The ECB published "Raising the Standard" in 1997, the ECB Management Board Blueprint for the Future Playing Structure of cricket. This introduced the concept of ECB Premier Leagues, designed to raise the playing standard of the top tier of club cricket and to bridge the gap between recreational cricket and the First Class game. A national network of Premier Leagues was established, with funding from the ECB. The Leagues have to meet the published ECB assessment criteria and they receive accreditation on an annual basis.

Premier Leagues are expected to establish links to other leagues in order to allow ambitious clubs to aspire to Premier League status over time. Many were based on existing leagues although some new Regional Premier Leagues were created. The ECB decided that overseas players are allowed to play in this top tier of club cricket provided that there is only one overseas player in any Premier League club team, which mirrors the arrangements for overseas players in the club cricket structures in countries such as Australia and South Africa.

The Premier League clubs must show a strong commitment to junior cricket and the assessment criteria explicitly require strong junior sections that can provide cricket coaching and matches for the next generation of cricketers. There is also an increased emphasis on practice and the development of skills for the adult players in Premier League clubs.

== Current ECB Premier Leagues ==
- Birmingham and District Premier League
- Bradford Premier League
- Cheshire County Cricket League
- Cornwall Cricket League
- Derbyshire County Cricket League
- Devon Cricket League
- Dorset Cricket League
- East Anglian Premier Cricket League
- Essex Cricket League
- Greater Manchester Cricket League
- Hertfordshire Cricket League
- Home Counties Premier Cricket League
- Huddersfield Cricket League (from 2025)
- Kent Cricket League
- Lancashire Cricket League
- Leicestershire and Rutland Cricket League
- Lincolnshire Premier Cricket League (from 2026)
- Liverpool and District Cricket Competition
- Middlesex County Cricket League
- North East Premier League
- North Staffordshire and South Cheshire League
- North Wales Cricket League
- North Yorkshire and South Durham Cricket League
- Northamptonshire Cricket League
- Northern Premier Cricket League
- Nottinghamshire Cricket Board Premier League
- South Wales Premier Cricket League
- Southern Premier Cricket League
- Surrey Championship
- Sussex Cricket League
- West of England Premier League
- Yorkshire Premier League North
- Yorkshire Cricket Southern Premier League

== Former ECB Premier League ==
- Yorkshire ECB County Premier League – dissolved after 2015 season and replaced by Yorkshire Premier League North and Yorkshire South Premier League, since renamed Yorkshire Cricket Southern Premier League
- Lincolnshire Premier League - dissolved after 2025 season and replaced by Lincolnshire Premier Cricket League

== See also ==
- England and Wales Cricket Board
- List of English and Welsh cricket league clubs
