= List of Lincolnshire County Cricket Club grounds =

Lincolnshire County Cricket Club was established on 28 September 1906; prior to that a county organisation had existed before, with Lincolnshire competing in the first Minor Counties Championship in 1895. The current club competed in the Minor Counties Championship from 1907 to 1914, and has since played minor counties cricket again from 1924, as well as playing in List A cricket from 1966 to 2004, using a different number of home grounds during that time. Their first home minor counties fixture in 1895 was against Norfolk at the Black Swan Ground, Spalding, while their first home List A match came 79 years later against Surrey in the 1974 Gillette Cup at Lindum Sports Club Ground, Lincoln.

The 23 grounds that Lincolnshire have used for home matches since 1895 are listed below, with statistics complete through to the end of the 2014 season.

== Grounds ==
=== List A ===
Below is a complete list of grounds used by Lincolnshire County Cricket Club when it was permitted to play List A matches. These grounds have also held Minor Counties Championship and MCCA Knockout Trophy matches.

Name	Location	First	Last	Matches	First	Last	Matches	First	Last	Matches	Refs
Name	Location	List A			Minor Counties Championship			MCCA Trophy			Refs
Lindum Sports Club Ground	Lincoln	10 July 1974 v Surrey	5 May 2004 v Glamorgan	5	31 July 1907 v Staffordshire	2 July 2000 v Cumberland	71	30 June 1996 v Bedfordshire	5 June 2011 v Norfolk	5	(Note: One first-class match was played here in 1969 when a combined Minor Counties cricket team played the touring New Zealanders. Minor Counties North played one List A match here against Kent in the 1979 Benson & Hedges Cup. Only the List A matches played at the ground by Lincolnshire are recorded in the table.)
London Road	Sleaford	29 June 1983 v Surrey	29 May 2002 v Glamorgan	5	22 July 1912 v Cambridgeshire	18 June 2014 v Staffordshire	50	19 May 1991 v Cambridgeshire	28 June 1998 v Yorkshire Cricket Board	4	(Note: Two first-class matches have been played here in the North v South fixtures of 1860 and 1864.)
Abbey Lawn	Bourne	only match: 13 September 2001 v Surrey Cricket Board		1	6 July 1955 v Cambridgeshire	21 May 2000 v Staffordshire	29	9 June 1999 v Yorkshire Cricket Board	20 May 2001 v Nottinghamshire Cricket Board	2	
Sports Ground	Cleethorpes	only match: 21 June 2000 v Lancashire		1	16 July 1969 v Staffordshire	20 July 2014 v Hertfordshire	29	5 June 1983 v Bedfordshire	7 July 2002 v Leicestershire Cricket Board	6	(Note: Nottinghamshire played four first-class matches here between 1980–1990, while a combined Minor Counties cricket team played a first-class match here against the touring Zimbabweans in 1985. Nottinghamshire played five List A matches here between 1983–2004, while Minor Counties North]] played one List A match here against Nottinghamshire in the 1972 Benson & Hedges Cup. Only the List A matches played at the ground by Lincolnshire are recorded in the table.)
Gorse Lane	Grantham	only match: 16 May 2000 v Netherlands		1	15 July 1996 v Cumberland	3 August 2014 v Buckinghamshire	24	5 June 1994 v Northumberland	13 June 2010 v Cheshire	5	

=== Minor Counties ===
Below is a complete list of grounds used by Lincolnshire County Cricket Club in Minor Counties Championship and MCCA Knockout Trophy matches.

Name	Location	First	Last	Matches	First	Last	Matches	Refs
Name	Location	Minor Counties Championship			MCCA Trophy			Refs
Black Swan Ground	Spalding	27 June 1895 v Norfolk	14 August 1911 v Cambridgeshire	6	–	–	0	
London Road	Grantham	8 August 1895 v Durham	17 July 1974 v Yorkshire Second XI	24	–	–	0	
People's Park	Grimsby	5 June 1907 v Lancashire Second XI	3 June 1908 v Northumberland	2	–	–	0	
Richmond Drive	Skegness	12 August 1907 v Yorkshire Second XI	2 July 1936 v Hertfordshire	14	–	–	0	(Note: One first-class match was played here in 1935 when a combined Minor Counties cricket team played the touring South Africans.)
Drewery Brothers Ground	Grimsby	18 August 1909 v Hertfordshire	29 August 1976 v Staffordshire	2	–	–	0	
Augusta Street	Grimsby	10 August 1910 v Bedfordshire	25 July 1909 v Buckinghamshire	44	22 June 1997 v Shropshire	25 June 2000 v Cheshire	3	
Jubilee Park	Woodhall Spa	28 July 1913 v Kent Second XI	10 June 1957 v Bedfordshire	4	27 April 2008 v Cambridgeshire	27 April 2014 v Cumberland	6	
Brumby Hall	Scunthorpe	12 August 1925 v Nottinghamshire Second XI	31 August 1998 v Staffordshire	49	only match: 31 May 1987 v Durham		1	(Note: Minor Counties North played one List A match here against Yorkshire in the 1975 Benson & Hedges Cup.)
Rose Brothers Sports Ground	Gainsborough	6 July 1927 v Bedfordshire	5 July 1961 v Shropshire	18	–	–	0	(Note: Two first-class matches have been played here in 1931 and 1937 when a combined Minor Counties cricket team played the touring New Zealanders.)
Burghley Park	Stamford	5 July 1928 v Leicestershire Second XI	4 July 1994 v Buckinghamshire	15	only match: 1 July 1990 v Devon		1	
Grammar School Ground	Boston	2 August 1929 v Hertfordshire	29 July 1932 v Cambridgeshire	4	–	–	0	
Central Park	Boston	17 June 1953 v Nottinghamshire Second XI	7 August 1994 v Staffordshire	9	–	–	0	
Paradise Field	Long Sutton	22 May 1961 v Bedfordshire	28 May 1972 v Suffolk	7	only match: 3 June 1984 v Northumberland		1	
Ross Sports Club Ground	Grimsby	7 June 1965 v Bedfordshire	27 July 1986 v Northumberland	18	only match: 4 June 1989 v Northumberland		1	
Stamford School Ground	Stamford	only match: 10 August 1966 v Cambridgeshire		1	–	–	0	
Memorial Field	Spalding	28 August 1967 v Suffolk	22 August 1982 v Norfolk	10	–	–	0	
Rase Park	Market Rasen	–	–	0	18 May 1985 v Northumberland	14 June 1987 v Northumberland	2	
Cross O'Cliff Court	Bracebridge Heath	–	–	0	11 May 2008 v Buckinghamshire	14 May 2014 v Northumberland	6	
