= David Christmas =

English cricketer

Personal information
- Full name: David Anthony Christmas
- Born: 1 April 1969 (age 57); Bourne, Lincolnshire, England
- Nickname: Father
- Batting: Right-handed
- Bowling: Right-arm medium
- Role: All-rounder

Domestic team information
- Years: Team
- 1989–2005: Lincolnshire
- LA debut: 26 June 1991 Lincolnshire v Nottinghamshire
- Last LA: 5 May 2004 Lincolnshire v Glamorgan

Career statistics
Competition	List A
Matches	14
Runs scored	153
Batting average	15.30
100s/50s	0/0
Top score	29
Balls bowled	710
Wickets	10
Bowling average	57.10
5 wickets in innings	0
10 wickets in match	0
Best bowling	2/48
Catches/stumpings	6/–
- Source: CricketArchive, 10 December 2009

David Anthony Christmas (born 1 April 1969) is an English cricketer. A right-handed batsman and right-arm medium pace bowler, he made fourteen List A appearances for Lincolnshire County Cricket Club and over 100 minor counties appearances. An all-rounder, he has captained Lincolnshire Cricket Board Premier League side Bourne Cricket Club since 1996.

== Career ==
Christmas made his début for Lincolnshire in their second match of the 1989 Minor Counties Championship. In a drawn match, he claimed one wicket and 42 runs. He played regularly for the county between 1989 and 2005, and appeared in two Minor Counties Championship finals, both against Devon. In 2000, Christmas was part of the Lincolnshire side that beat Netherlands in the second round of the National Westminster Bank Trophy, before losing to a strong Lancashire side in the next round. Christmas made a quick 26 off 24 balls from number nine in the third round match, before being caught off the bowling of India Test cricketer Sourav Ganguly. Lancashire went on to be beaten by Gloucestershire in the semi-finals. His last game for Lincolnshire was against Staffordshire in 2005, since which he has appeared on three occasions for 'Lincolnshire Development Squad'.

He plays club cricket for Bourne Cricket Club, and has captained them since 1996. They have been frequent top-half finishers in the Lincolnshire Cricket Board Premier League under his captaincy. He has been described by the Peterborough Evening Telegraph as Bourne Cricket Club's "heavyweight all-round skipper", and a club legend. Due to his surname, he is known as 'Father'.
