= Rushden and Higham Town Cricket Club =

Amateur English cricket club

Coordinates: 52°17′34″N 0°35′13″W

- League: Northamptonshire Cricket League

Team information
- Colors: Blue White
- Home ground: Short Stocks, Rushden, Northamptonshire

History
- ECB Premier Division wins: 1
- Official website: randhtcc.play-cricket.com

Rushden and Higham Town Cricket Club is an amateur cricket club based in Rushden, Northamptonshire, England. The club has 3 senior XI teams in the Northamptonshire Cricket League, and an established Junior Section, who compete in the Higham & District Youth League. Rushden also field a Sunday XI team who play friendly matches in and around the region.

== Ground ==
Rushden and Higham Town's First and Second XI teams play their home matches at the Town Ground in Rushden, rated as 'Good' quality ground by the East Northamptonshire Council (ENC). The Town Ground was used by Northamptonshire County Cricket Club for 22 first-class matches between 1924 and 1963, but has been the home ground for Rushden since 2003. The Third XI team use the Saffron Road Recreation Ground, in Higham Ferrers, Rushden, rated as a 'Standard' quality ground by the East Northamptonshire Council.

== History ==
Evidence shows that cricket has been played in Rushden since the middle of the 19th century, with a record of a match being played as early as 1868. One of the earliest known references to a cricket ground was mentioned in a match report dated 1 August 1874, in the Northampton Mercury stating "Pikehills" to be the location and by the 1880s, reports show Rushden Cricket Club winning their second County Challenge Cup in 1884. By 1889, Rushden Cricket Club amalgamated with both the local Football and Rugby club to become the 'Rushden Cricket and Football Club'; and the club moved to their current ground in the same year. By the 1920s Rushden were competing in the Rushden and District League and after the Second World War, they joined the Northamptonshire County League; becoming league champions in 1959 and 1960. Further success was achieved in the Bedford and District Cricket League with the club becoming league champions in 1966. In the 1970s, the club played for the Bedfordshire Millman Trophy and continued competing in the Northants County League up to the turn of the millennium, when the League became a designated ECB Premier League. It was at this time when the club's 120-year-old pavilion was destroyed by fire, along with most of the club's material history in 2000. However, a few years into the millennium saw the club bounce back with the addition of two senior teams (3rd XI side in 2007 and a 4th XI in 2012) and a cluster of division wins leading up to the club becoming Premier League Champions in 2015. After the 2018 season, Rushden Town entered into a merger with its neighbouring club 'Higham Ferrers Town' and became Rushden and Higham Town Cricket Club.

== Club Performance ==
The Northamptonshire Cricket League competition results showing the club's positions in the league (by Division) since 2003.

Key
Gold	Champions
Red	Relegated
Grey	League Suspended

Key
P	ECB Premier Division
1	Division One
2	Division Two, etc.

Northamptonshire Cricket League
Team	2003	2004	2005	2006	2007	2008	2009	2010	2011	2012	2013	2014	2015	2016	2017	2018	2019	2020	2021	2022	2023	2024	2025	2026
1st XI	P	P	P	P	P	P	P	P	P	1	1	P	P	P	P	P	P	P	P	P	1	P	P	P
2nd XI	3	3	3	3	3	3	3	3	3	3	2	2	2	2	2	3	3	3	3	4	5	4	4	5
3rd XI					13	12	12	11	11	11	11	10	10	10	10	10	11	10	10	12	12	12	12	11N
4th XI										14	14	14	13	13	13									

== Club Honours ==
Northamptonshire Cricket League
Division	Year(s)
Premier	2015
Division One	2013, 2023
Division Three	2012
Division Eleven	2013

Bedford & District Cricket League
Division	Year(s)
Division One	1966

Northant's County League
Division	Year(s)
Division One	1959, 1960

Cup Competitions
Result	Cup	Year
Winner	NCL T20 Championship	2025
Winner	NCL Division 12 KO Cup	2022
Winner	Northant's County Challenge Cup	188?, 1884
