= Rutland and District Cricket League =

Regional English Cricket League

- Countries: England
- Format: Limited overs cricket
- Tournament format: League
- Number of teams: 8 (Division 1)
- Current champion: Newborough CC
- Most successful: Peterborough Town CC (8 titles)
- Website: https://rutland.play-cricket.com

The Rutland and District Cricket League (RDCL) is a Sunday League that administer's cricket clubs that participate in the League, Cup and trophy competitions. Albeit a Rutland centric Sunday cricket league, the headquarters for the RDCL is based in Swineshead, Lincolnshire.

The Rutland & District Cricket League operates mainly in the county of Rutland, but many clubs participate from beyond the county boundary, with representatives from Leicestershire, Lincolnshire, Cambridgeshire and Northamptonshire. For the 2021 season the RDCL held 42 teams from 32 clubs in its divisions. The League is divided into 5 Divisions with, wherever possible, a minimum of 8 and a maximum of 10 teams in each division.

Rutland and District Cricket League 2021

== Past winners ==
- Year	Champions
  2004	Market Overton
  2005	Rushton
  2006	Elton Park
  2007	Ketton
  2008	Rushton
  2009	Oundle Town
  2010	Peterborough Town
  2011	Peterborough Town
  2012	Peterborough Town
  2013	Bourne
  2014	Peterborough Town
  2015	Uppingham Town
  2016	Nassington
  2017	Wisbech Town
  2018	Barnack
  2019	Peterborough Town
  2020	League suspended (Note: Coronavirus pandemic forced all formal competitive sporting activities to be suspended.)
  2021	Peterborough Town
  2022	Peterborough Town
  2023	Barnack
- Year	Champions
  2024	Peterborough Town
  2025	Burghley Park
  2026	Newborough

== Performance by season from 2004 ==
Key
Gold	Champions
Blue	Left League
Red	Relegated

Performance by season, from 2004
Club	2004	2005	2006	2007	2008	2009	2010	2011	2012	2013	2014	2015	2016	2017	2018	2019	2020	2021	2022	2023	2024	2025	2026
Barnack	7	10					5	3	7	7	6	4	7	5	1	3		3	2	1	6	5	6
Bourne						8	3	5	2	1	3	8	2	2	3								
Buckminster			9		7	7																	
Burghley Park																		4	6	5	2	1	7
Castor (Note: Castor entered into a merger after the 2004 season and became Castor & Ailsworth.)	4																						
Castor & Ailsworth		8	10																				
City																		5	4	3	4	4	4
Eaton Socon										6	8	9											
Elton Park			1	7																			
Finedon Dolben								8	6	9													
Godmanchester Town		3	6	4	3	2	4																
Grantham														7	8	2							
Ketton (Note: Ketton added Sports to the name after the 2017 season.)	8	6	5	1										3									
Ketton Sports															2								
Kings Keys															7	7							
Long Sutton																					8		
March Town								4	5	8	10					4		8					
Market Deeping	3	4	8	9		6	8	9					8	9		6		7					
Market Overton	1	2	7	5	8	10			10		9												
Medbourne							7	10				10											
Nassington									4	4	7	2	1	4									
Newborough																					3	2	1
Oakham																			7			8	
Oundle Town	5	5	3	3	2	1	2	2	3	2	5	7	6	6	6	8							
Perkins				8	4																		
Peterborough Town	2	7	4	6	5	3	1	1	1	5	1	6	4	8	5	1		1	1	2	1	3	2
Railway	6	9																					
Rushton		1	2	2	1	4	6																
Stamford Town	9							6	8	10		5	5	10									
Stewarts & Lloyds	10																						
Uffington																		6	8				8
Ufford Park													9									6	5
Uppingham Town				10		9		7	9		2	1	10						5	6	7		3
Weldon															9								
Werrington																				4	5	7	
Wisbech Town					6	5	9			3	4	3	3	1	4	5		2	3	7			
References																	(Note: The COVID-19 pandemic forced a reduction in league activity. A replacement competition was organised for the latter part of the season when cricket became possible again, but with the winners not to be regarded as official league champions.)						
