= P W Wills =

Former department store group

P W Wills was a department store located in Rushden, with smaller branches located in Kettering and Wellingborough. The business went into liquidation in 2010.

== History ==
P W Wills was started by husband and wife, Percy and Helen Wills in 1922. Percy had worked in the shoe trade building up contacts, and as he knew his wife had taste in fashions, decided to open a small ladies fashions store in Park Road, Rushden. The business use to hold fashion shows to show off the wears, with the 1948 show being held at the Windmill Hall and attracting over 2000 people.

The business was successful, so the business moved to new premises on the corner of Newton Road and the High Street in Rushden. The new store allowed the company to increase their product range. The business continued to grow adding further stores in Wellingborough (1936) and Kettering (1938).

Between 1961 and 1962 the business renovated the store with new shop fronts and interiors, and in 1969 the company joined the Associated Independent Store group, the largest buying group in the country at that time. The building was further remodelled in 1974, which doubled the shop floor space in Newton Road.

During the 1980s, a hardware department was added to the store plus a car park was created in Newton Road. Further refurbishment of the store occurred in 1985/86 on the first floor, with the ground floor receiving a refurbishment in 1987. However, in 1986, the Kettering store was closed.

During the 1990s the store was extended by purchasing the lease on the neighbouring George Allan property, turning this new area into an exclusive Wills for Men department. In 1999 the shoe department was relaunched in new premises, that had formerly housed Horsley's Pet Shop.

However the financial collapse of the late 00s and the fall off in sales saw the business be put into liquidation and closed in September 2010.
