= Bourne Cricket Club (Lincolnshire) =

Cricket club in England

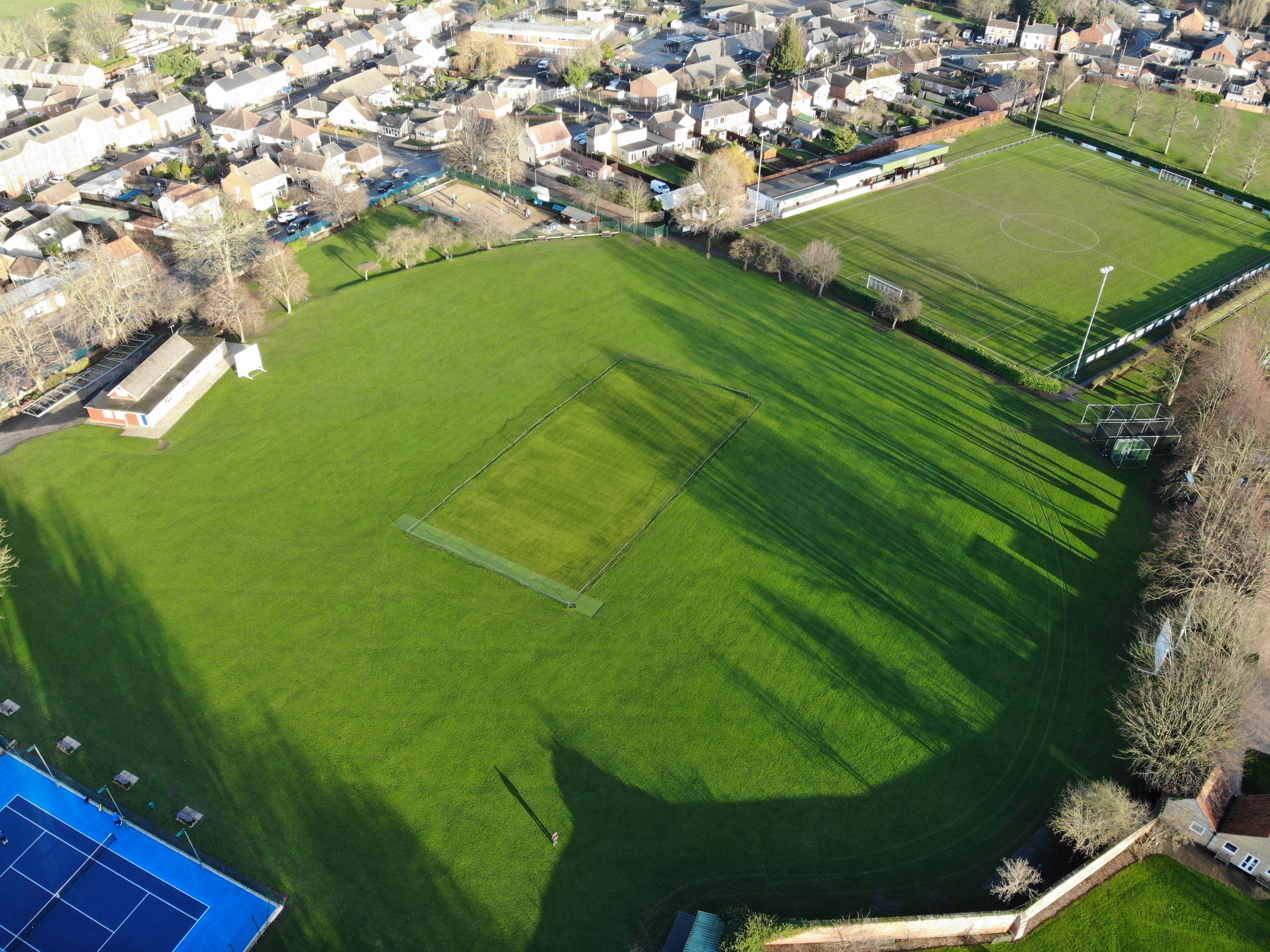
- Bourne Abbey Lawn, home of Bourne Cricket Club and Bourne Town Football Club

Personnel
- Captain: Dan Freeman
- Overseas player: Raymond Toole (New Zealand)
- Manager: Hedley Stroud

Team information
- Colors: Blue Yellow
- Home ground: Abbey Lawn, Bourne
- Capacity: 88,000

History
- First-class debut: at Abbey Lawns
- ECB Lincolnshire Premier League wins: 6
- Rutland & District Cricket League wins: 1
- Official website: Website

Bourne Cricket Club, is an amateur cricket club based in Bourne, Lincolnshire, England. Bourne's 1st XI Team play in the ECB Lincolnshire County Board Premier League, the 2nd XI compete in the South Lincs & Border League. Bourne also field a Sunday XI team in the Rutland and District Cricket League, a Women's team in the East Midlands Women's Cricket League, and they have an established Junior Section, who play in The Border County Cricket Association.

== Ground ==
Bourne's ground is at Abbey Lawn, and the current groundsman is Clive Brown. The ground's highest score is 270* and was set by Peter Morgan (Bourne); the highest partnership is 356 (Between Spinks 207* Fotheringham 119* and 30 extras), with the best bowling figures 9-28 set by Mark Dixon against Hartsholme CC in 2010.

== History ==
Bourne have been League Champions six times since the Premier League was founded in 2000; winning it in 2000, 2001, 2010, 2014, 2021 and 2022. 2011 saw a hard-fought season brought down to the Bracebridge v Bourne winner takes all penultimate game, which Bourne lost, losing the league by 18 points. Fahad Masood, Pakistani International also managed to break the league wicket taking record, by 86 wickets in the 2011 season

The club has played host to Rotary International fixtures, county games, the Lord's Taverners and Nottinghamshire. In the past 50 years the club has been a victim to arson on two occasions. On one occasion, before a Hodgkinson Cup 6's tournament, after which the tournament went ahead being based in a mobile office.

The club has created professionals Luke Wright (Leicestershire, Sussex and England), Andy Afford (Nottinghamshire and England) and Richard Bates (Nottinghamshire and England women's coach who became world champions), and Joey Evison (Kent and England u19s).
