= Rushden Hall =

Grade II* listed country house in Northamptonshire, England

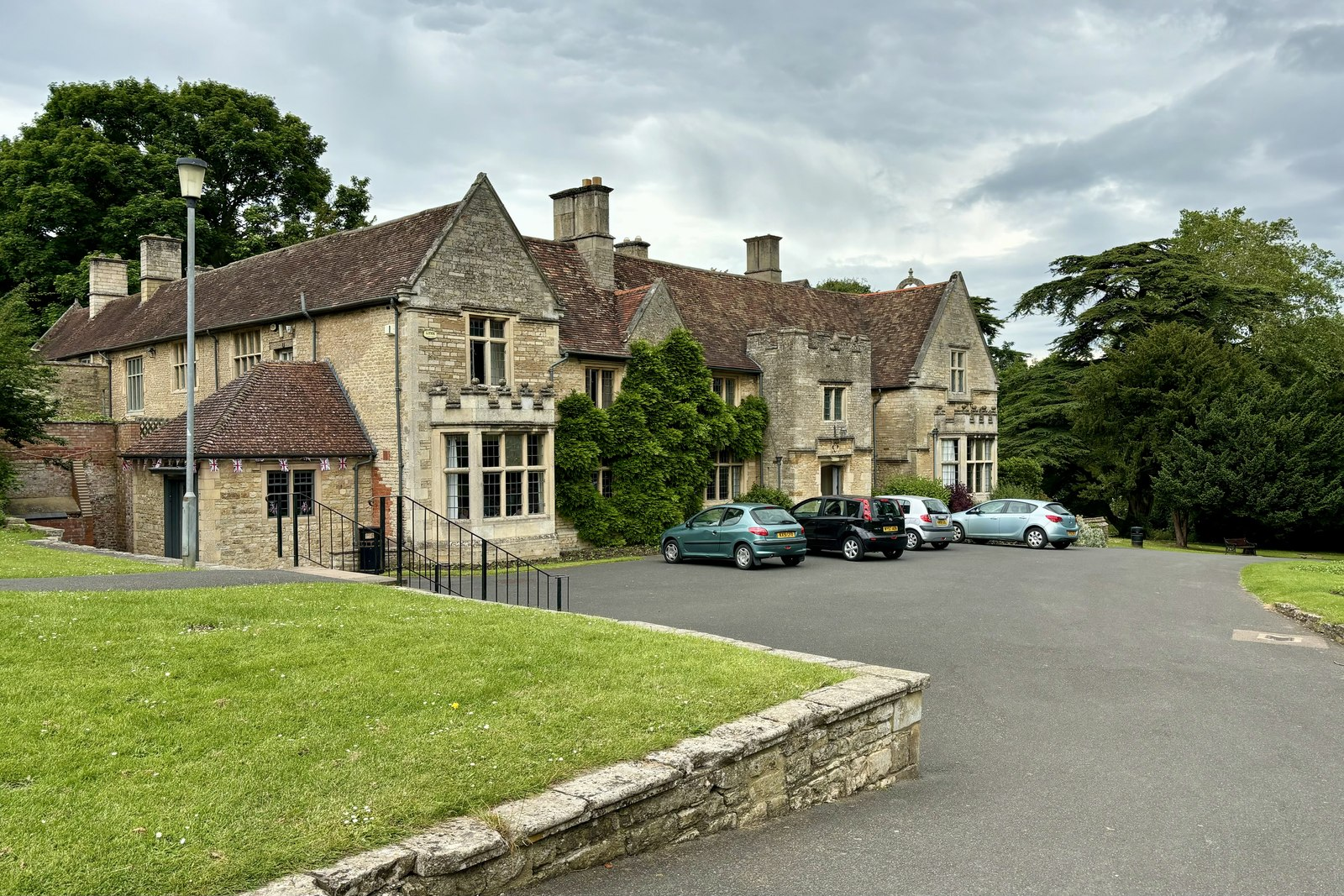
- Rushden Hall in 2024
- Interactive map of the Rushden Hall area

General information
- Type: Grade II* listed
- Location: Rushden, England
- Coordinates: 52.2867°N 0.5998°W
- Completed: 14th century
- Owner: Pemberton family

Technical details
- Structural system: Limestone

Rushden Hall is a historic Grade II* listed country house located in the town of Rushden in Northamptonshire which was built for the Pemberton family in the 14th century.

Originally in private hands, it was opened to the public in 1930. In the 1960s, parts of the property had fallen into disrepair and the local council had considered demolition, but it was later restored.

Today, it serves as the headquarters of Rushden Town Council and also hosts office space for private businesses. Rooms are also available for hire for social functions, weddings and exhibitions.
