= Peterborough Town Cricket Club =

Coordinates: 52°35′03″N 0°16′28″W

- League: Northamptonshire Cricket League

Team information
- Colors: Black Gold
- Home ground: Dalrod Sports Ground, Bretton

History
- ECB Northamptonshire Cricket League Championship wins: 5
- Rutland & District Cricket League Championship wins: 8
- Official website: ptcc.clubbuzz.co.uk

Peterborough Town Cricket Club is part of City of Peterborough Sports Club based at Dalrod Sports Ground, Bretton, Peterborough, Cambridgeshire, England. Peterborough Town have two senior Saturday XI teams in the Northamptonshire Cricket League, a 3rd XI team in the Huntingdonshire County Cricket League, two Sunday XI teams in the Rutland and District Cricket League, and an established Junior Section, who play in the Higham & District Youth League.

== Ground ==
Peterborough Town's 1st and 2nd XI play their home matches at the Dalrod Sports Ground, Bretton, and the 3rd XI use the Thomas Deacon Academy, Queen's Gardens, Peterborough. In 2005 they were one of the 1st clubs in the country to receive Clubmark accreditation from the ECB. The club was re-accredited in 2019. A brand new electronic scoreboard was installed at the start of the 2018 season, and a two lane artificial net practice facility that was laid at the start of the 2009 season was refurbished in 2020.

== History ==
Competing in the Northamptonshire County Cricket League, Peterborough Town became League Champions as early as 1956, and continued to achieve further successes in the league up to the late 1990s. 1970 saw the formation of the Peterborough Town Cricket, Hockey & Squash Club Ltd (now known as the City of Peterborough Sports Club). The club was formed by an amalgamation of Peterborough Town Cricket Club and Peterborough Town Hockey Club, formerly based at Crawthorne Road, and the City & Counties Squash Club formerly based in Priestgate. Up until 1971 Peterborough Town Cricket Club was based at Crawthorne Road in the city centre but then relocated to Bretton Gate, presently known as the Dalrod Sports Ground. By 1999, the Northamptonshire Cricket League, as it is now known, was designated an ECB Premier League, and Peterborough Town is one of only three cricket clubs (Finedon Dolben, Old Northamptonians and Peterborough Town) to have held a constant presence in the highest level of competition for recreational club cricket in Northamptonshire, with five ECB Premiership league championship titles to their name. Peterborough Town also maintain a significant presence in the regional Sunday cricket league, the Rutland and District Cricket League, and they have achieved seven League Championship titles since 2010.

Beyond League activity, Peterborough Town attracted national attention when they became a group champion in the ECB National Club Cricket Championship in 2018. High Wycombe just needed three runs to win, off the final two overs, but Peterborough Town miraculously took seven wickets in 11 balls to win the Group Championship.

== Club Performance ==
The Northamptonshire Cricket League competition results showing the club's positions in the league (by Division) since 2003.

Key
Gold	Champions
Red	Relegated
Grey	League Suspended

Key
P	ECB Premier Division
1	Division One
2	Division Two, etc.

Northamptonshire Cricket League
Team	2003	2004	2005	2006	2007	2008	2009	2010	2011	2012	2013	2014	2015	2016	2017	2018	2019	2020	2021	2022	2023	2024	2025	2026
1st XI	P	P	P	P	P	P	P	P	P	P	P	P	P	P	P	P	P	P	P	P	P	P	P	P
2nd XI	4	4	4	4	4	4	4	3	3	2	1	1	1	1	2	2	2	2	2	1	1	1	1	1

Source: Northamptonshire Cricket League

The Huntingdonshire County Cricket League competition results showing the club's positions in the league (by Division) since 2011.

Huntingdonshire County Cricket League
Team	2011	2012	2013	2014	2015	2016	2017	2018	2019	2020	2021	2022	2023	2023	2024	2025
3rd XI	3	3	2	2	2	2	2	3	2	2	2	2	2	3	3	3
4th XI	DD	DD													4	4

Source: Huntingdonshire County Cricket League

The Rutland and District Cricket League competition results showing the club's positions in the league (by Division) since 2000.

Rutland and District Cricket League
Team	2000	2001	2002	2003	2004	2005	2006	2007	2008	2009	2010	2011	2012	2013	2014	2015	2016	2017	2018	2019	2020	2021	2022	2023	2024	2025	2026
Sunday 1st XI	4	3	3	2	1	1	1	1	1	1	1	1	1	1	1	1	1	1	1	1	1	1	1	1	1	1	1
Sunday 2nd XI					R1	R1	7	7	6	5	4	3	4	4	4	5	5	4W	4E	4E	4E	4E	4E	4E	4E	4E	4

Source: Rutland and District Cricket League

== Club Honours ==
Northamptonshire Cricket League Champions
Division	Year(s)
Premier	2012, 2013, 2014, 2019, 2020, 2021
Division Two	2012, 2021

Huntingdonshire Cricket League
Division	Year(s)
Division 3	2012
Division 4	2012

Northamptonshire County Cricket League
Division	Year(s)
Division One	1956, 1979, 1991, 1996
Division Two	1994, 1996
Division Three	1989

Rutland and District Cricket League
Division	Year(s)
Division 1	2010, 2011, 2012, 2014, 2019, 2020, 2021, 2022, 2024
Division 2	2003
Division 3	2002
Division 4	2000
Division 6	2008
Division 7	2007

Cup & Trophy Competitions
Result	Cup	Year
Winners	Hevey NCL T20 Championship	2011, 2013, 2014, 2018, 2021, 2023 (Note: 2023 shared with Oundle Town CC)
Winners	NCL Division Two Knock-out Final Trophy	2021
Winners	Northamptonshire County Knock-out Cup	2011, 2013, 2014, 2018
Winners	ECB Club T20 East Midlands Area Champions	2011, 2013, 2014
Winners	RDCL John Wilcox Cup	2009, 2011, 2013
Winners	RDCL Stamford KO Shield	2023, 2024, 2025
