= Town Ground, Rushden =

Cricket ground in Rushden, England

Coordinates: 52.292°N 0.587°W

The Town Ground in Rushden is a cricket ground which was used by Northamptonshire County Cricket Club in 22 first-class matches for 39 years between 1924 and 1963. It is now used predominantly for Northamptonshire Premier League games, serving as the home ground of 2015 Northamptonshire Cricket League Premier Division Champions Rushden and Higham Town Cricket Club since 2003.

== Records ==
- Lowest team total: 66 by Northamptonshire v Worcestershire, 1939
- Highest individual score: 141 by NW Hill for Nottinghamshire against Northamptonshire, 1961
- Highest partnership: 192 by NW Hill and G Millman for the second wicket in Nottinghamshires innings against Northamptonshire, 1961
- Best bowling in an innings: 9-53 by JH Cornford for Sussex against Northamptonshire, 1949
- Best Bowling in a match: 12-74 by RTD Perks for Worcestershire against Northamptonshire, 1948
