= St John's Hospital, Bracebridge Heath =

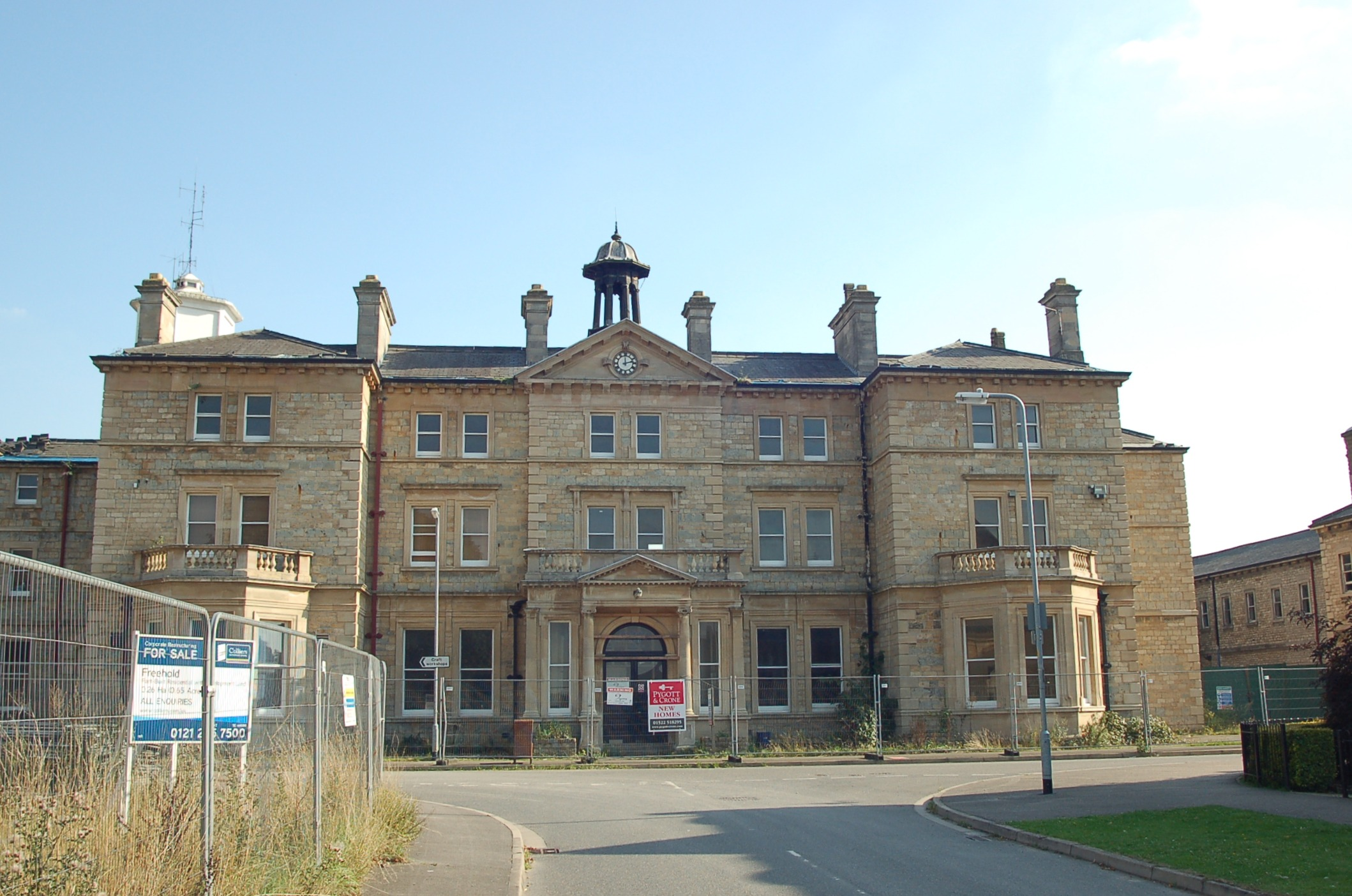
- St John's Hospital, Bracebridge Heath

- Shown in Lincolnshire

Geography
- Location: Bracebridge Heath, Lincolnshire, England
- Coordinates: 53.1975°N 0.5326°W

Organisation
- Care system: National Health Service
- Type: Mental health

History
- Founded: 1852
- Closed: 1989

St John's Hospital, Bracebridge Heath was a mental health facility at Bracebridge Heath in Lincolnshire.

== History ==
The hospital was designed by John Hamilton and James Medland in the Italianate style as the Lincolnshire County Lunatic Asylum and opened in 1852. It became Bracebridge Pauper Lunatic Asylum in 1898 and Bracebridge Mental Hospital in 1919. It served as an Emergency Hospital during the Second World War and, having been renamed Bracebridge Heath Hospital in 1939, joined the National Health Service in 1948. It went on to become St John's Hospital, Bracebridge Heath in 1961.

The hospital closed in December 1989 and the site has been sold to a property developer who has built 183 luxury homes and apartments there. The original hospital buildings are classified as Grade II listed buildings.
