= Finedon Dolben Cricket Club =

Coordinates: 52°20′23″N 0°39′42″W

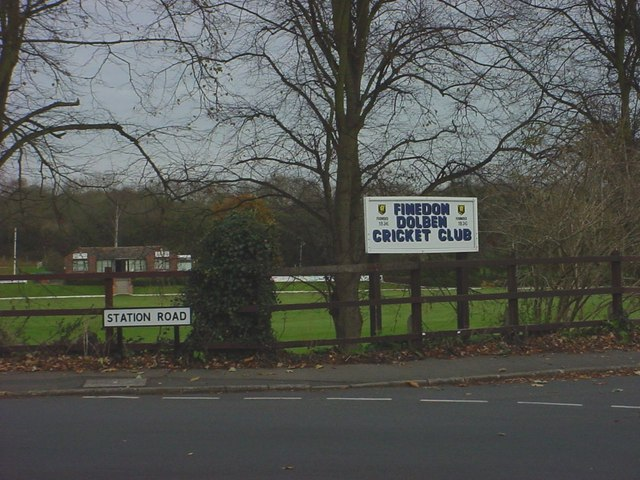
- Finedon Dolben Cricket Club
- League: Northamptonshire Cricket League

Team information
- Colors: Blue Gold
- Founded: 1836
- Home ground: Avenue Road, Finedon, Wellingborough

History
- Premier wins: 15
- Official website: finedondolben.play-cricket.com

Finedon Dolben Cricket Club is an amateur cricket club based in Finedon, Northamptonshire, England. Finedon Dolben have 4 senior XI teams in the Northamptonshire Cricket League, and an established Junior Section, who play in both the Higham & District Youth League and the Corby and District Youth Cricket League

== Club history ==
Finedon Dolben Cricket Club was founded in 1836 and records show that they joined the Kettering & District Cricket League in 1896. After many years of league activity, resulting in numerous championship title wins, Finedon Dolben became a member of the Northamptonshire Cricket League. Since the Northamptonshire Cricket League was designated an ECB Premier League in 1999, Finedon Dolben is one of only three cricket clubs (Finedon Dolben, Old Northamptonians and Peterborough Town) to have held a constant presence in the highest level of competition for recreational club cricket in Northamptonshire, with eleven ECB Premiership league championship titles to their name.

== Club Performance ==
The Northamptonshire Cricket League competition results showing the club's positions in the league (by Division) since 1999.

Key
Gold	Champions
Red	Relegated
Grey	League Suspended

Key
P	ECB Premier Division
1	Division One
2	Division Two, etc.

Northamptonshire Cricket League
Team	1999	2000	2001	2002	2003	2004	2005	2006	2007	2008	2009	2010	2011	2012	2013	2014	2015	2016	2017	2018	2019	2020	2021	2022	2023	2024	2025	2026
1st XI	P	P	P	P	P	P	P	P	P	P	P	P	P	P	P	P	P	P	P	P	P	P	P	P	P	P	P	P
2nd XI					4	3	2	2	2	2	2	2	2	1	1	1	1	1	1	2	2	1	1	2	2	2	2	2
3rd XI						11	11	11	10	10	10	9	8	8	7	6	5	4	4	4	4	4	4	5	5	4	5	6
4th XI														14	13	12	12	11	11	10	10	9	9	8	9	9	10	11N

== Club Honours ==
Northamptonshire Cricket League Champions
Division	Year(s)
Premier	1999, 2000, 2001, 2002, 2003, 2006, 2007, 2009, 2010, 2011, 2018, 2022, 2023
Division Two	2019
Division Six	2014
Division Seven	2013
Division Eight	2012
Division Nine	2021
Division Ten	2019
Division Eleven	2004, 2006, 2017

NCL - Cup Competitions
Result	Cup	Year
Winners	Hevey NCL T20 Championship - Finals Day	2019
Winners	Northamptonshire County Knock-out Cup	1998, 1999, 2003

Northamptonshire County Cricket League
Division	Year(s)
Premier	1997, 1998
Division One	1973
Division Two	1957
Division Three	1967

Kettering & District League Trophy
Division	Year(s)
Division One	1931, 1932, 1933, 1934
