= Council Buildings, Rushden =

Municipal building in Rushden, Northamptonshire, England

Council Buildings
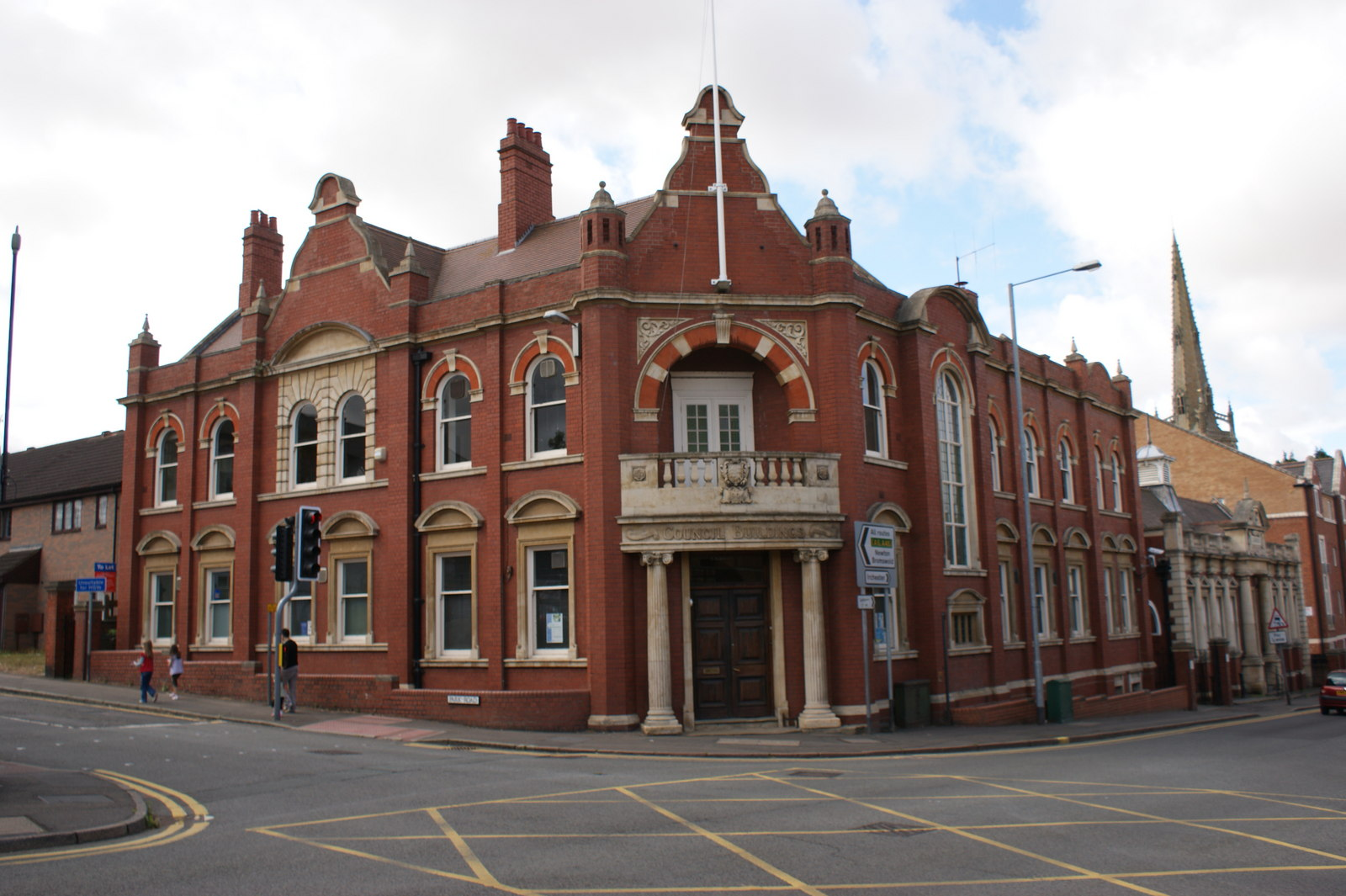
- Council Buildings, Rushden

- Shown in Northamptonshire
- 52.2891°N 0.5960°W
- Location: Newton Road, Rushden

History
- Built: 1906; 120 years ago

Site notes
- Architect: William Madin
- Architectural style: Renaissance style

The Council Buildings are based in Newton Road, Rushden, Northamptonshire, England. The structure, which was the headquarters of Rushden Urban District Council, is a locally listed building.

== History ==
Following significant population growth, partly associated with the local boot and shoe making industry, the area became an urban district in 1895. The council held its early meetings in the local vestry hall. However, in the early 20th century, civic leaders decided to procure purpose-built council buildings: the site they chose was open land on the south side of what was then Church Lane (later renamed Newton Road). The vestry hall, which had been owned by the local board, was subsequently sold to St Mary's Church and the proceeds applied towards repaying funds borrowed to finance the cost of the new building.

The new building was designed by William Madin in the Renaissance style, built in red brick with stone dressings by a local contractor, R. Marriott, and was officially opened on 19 December 1906. The design involved a symmetrical frontage at the junction of Newton Road and Park Road; the corner section featured a doorway flanked by Doric order columns supporting an entablature inscribed with the words "Council Buildings"; on the first floor there was a curved stone balcony with a balustrade bearing the town's coat of arms and a recessed French door with an arched surround; the section was flanked by full-height octagonal turrets and there was a gable at roof level. Internally, the principal rooms were the council chamber and the offices of the town surveyor and the sanitary inspector. A second storey was added to the Newton Road elevation of the building in 1934.

The council buildings continued to serve as the headquarters of Rushden Urban District Council for much of the 20th century and initially remained the meeting place of the enlarged East Northamptonshire District Council after it was formed in 1974. The district council moved to temporary offices in Thrapston in the mid-1980s, but continued to use the Rushden building as a customer service centre for locally delivered services such as housing benefits.

A programme of improvement works, which included the construction of a glass atrium connecting the council buildings with the adjacent Carnegie Library, was carried out in the mid-1990s. The works also included the creation of a heritage centre, on the first floor of the council buildings, which was officially opened by the Chairman of East Northamptonshire District Council, Councillor Ted Sampson, in October 1995. After putting on a series of exhibitions with local themes, the heritage centre closed in 2006.
