= Sidney King =

English cricketer (1885–1972)

Personal information
- Full name: Sidney King
- Born: 1885; Rushden, Northamptonshire, England
- Died: 1972 (aged 86–87); Rushden, Northamptonshire, England
- Batting: Unknown

Domestic team information
- Years: Team
- 1907–1908: Northamptonshire

Career statistics
Competition	First-class
Matches	4
Runs scored	47
Batting average	9.40
100s/50s	–/–
Top score	23
Balls bowled	–
Wickets	–
Bowling average	–
5 wickets in innings	–
10 wickets in match	–
Best bowling	–
Catches/stumpings	2/–
- Source: Cricinfo, 17 November 2011

Sidney King (1885–1972) was an English cricketer. King's batting style is unknown. He was born in Rushden, Northamptonshire.

King made his first-class debut for Northamptonshire against Gloucestershire in the 1907 County Championship. He made three further first-class appearances, the last of which came against Hampshire in the 1908 County Championship. In his four first-class matches, he scored 47 runs at an average of 9.40, with a high score of 23.

He died at the town of his birth sometime in 1977.
