= Bracebridge Heath =

Village and civil parish in Lincolnshire, England

Coordinates: 53.191395°N 0.536475°W

- Village and civil parish
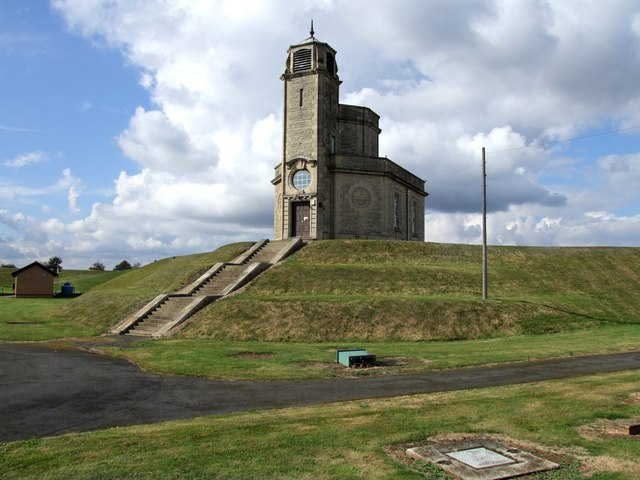
- Bracebridge Heath Reservoir

- Location within Lincolnshire
- Area: 1.89111 sq mi (4.8980 km^{2})
- Population: 5,789 (2021 census)
  - Density: 3,061/sq mi (1,182/km^{2})
- OS grid reference: SK978670
  - London: 118.13 mi (190.11 km) S
- District: North Kesteven
- Shire county: Lincolnshire
- Region: East Midlands
- Country: England
- Sovereign state: United Kingdom
- Post town: Lincoln
- Postcode district: LN4
- Dialling code: 01522
- Police: Lincolnshire
- Fire: Lincolnshire
- Ambulance: East Midlands
- UK Parliament: Lincoln
- Website: Bracebridge Heath Parish Council

Bracebridge Heath is a village and civil parish in the North Kesteven district of Lincolnshire, England. It is 2 miles (3 km) south of Lincoln and straddles the border with the Lincoln and North Kesteven district boundaries.

It lies at the junction of two major roads, the A15 to Sleaford and the A607 to Grantham.

The village is on top of Lincoln Cliff, overlooking Lincoln and the valley of the River Witham. The population of the civil parish at the 2021 census was 5,789.

== History ==
Bracebridge may have had its origins in the Old English braesc + brycg, meaning 'bridge or causeway made of branches'. The River Witham runs 1 mile (1.6 km) to the west, lending some credibility to this theory.

The village is mentioned in the Domesday Book as "Brachebrige". Before the Norman Conquest lordship was held by Ulf Fenman, and after by Bishop Geoffrey of Coutances, who also became Tenant-in-chief.

Bracebridge Heath lies on the route of the Roman Ermine Street that runs approximately 200 miles (320 km) from London to York. The central road junction in Bracebridge Heath is the junction of three Roman roads, now the A15 (the Sleaford Road), the A607 (the Grantham Road), and Cross O'Cliffe Hill into Lincoln. The line of Ermine Street, when extended from its last traceable part at Harmston, south of Bracebridge Heath, runs north through Waddington to Heath Road in Bracebridge Heath. Heath Road continues the line of Ermine Street.

According to White's 1876 Lincolnshire, the parish of 1,482 acres (6.00 km^{2}) was part of Boothby Graffoe Wapentake, and consisted of the Lincoln County Lunatic Asylum on Sleaford Road, All Saints' church, and a vicarage. In 1876, 340 persons were recorded as living in the parish, the most notable of which included:

- Thomas Allen, MD (at the Asylum)
- William Andrew, Solicitor
- Rev. William Bromehead BA, Vicar
- William Coupland, Blacksmith and Beerhouse
- William Green, Blacksmith
- George Kirkup, Asylum Steward
- William Mills, Wards Brickyard
- Edward Palmer, MD, Asylum Superintendent
- George Wheatley, Carpenter
- Charles White, Pattern and Clog Maker
- John Wollfit, Licensed Victualler, at The John Bull
- Thomas Butler, Farmer
- Charles Clarke, Farmer
- Edwin Scrivener, Farmer
- William Toulson, Farmer
- Mrs Mary Winn, Post and Carrier from Lincoln
- Harry Webber, Hall Farm hand

Bracebridge Heath has changed considerably since White's description of 1876. The village boundary has extended northwards in the direction of Lincoln and southwards towards the village of Waddington.

== Governance ==
Bracebridge Heath is a civil parish with a parish council of 13 members. Until 1898 Bracebridge Heath was part of the parish of Bracebridge. The parish of Bracebridge Heath was created by a Local Government Order (Kesteven) on 1 April 1898. To date, it has remained basically as it was created apart from one minor boundary adjustment.

At the lower tier of local government, the parish is in North Kesteven district. The parish is also an electoral ward, represented by two members on the district council.

At the upper tier of local government, it is in Lincolnshire non-metropolitan county. For elections to Lincolnshire County Council, it is in Washingborough electoral division.

Historically, Bracebridge Heath was part of the Boothby Graffoe Wapentake in the Kesteven riding. It was in Branston Rural District from 1894 to 1931, and then North Kesteven Rural District until the current North Kesteven district was created in 1974.

== Demographics ==
At the 2021 census, the civil parish had a population of 5,789 people in 2,550 households.

Census population of Bracebridge Heath parish
Census	Population	Female	Male	Households	Source
2001	4,530	2,339	2,191	2,012	
2011	5,656	2,903	2,753	2,481	
2021	5,789	2,971	2,818	2,550	

== Landmarks ==
A local landmark is the finely worked stone water pumping station and reservoir located on Grantham Road, known locally as 'the water tower', as opposed to the white 'hospital water tower', a header tank for the hospital laundry boilers was another prominent landmark, but this was demolished in 2014. This 'new' (1912) subterranean reservoir, of which only the 'pumping machinery tower' can be seen, was an overflow for the main reservoir in Westgate Water Tower, and replaced an 'old' open reservoir on Bracebridge Heath on London Road, built in 1871 and closed in 1925. It had been left water-filled from 1912 as an emergency supply in case of fire at the asylum until the new hospital water tower was erected and connected to the mains in 1925, from whence it lay empty, and decaying until 1972 when it was filled in and built on, today it is known as Stanley Crescent.

Other than the old mental hospital chapel (now private accommodation), there is St John's Church (Church of England) on Grantham Road and the Methodist Church, on almost the opposite side of the road. There is also a Deeper Life Bible Church. St John's primary school, (now an Academy School) formerly Bracebridge Heath County Primary School,(1880) is situated on the same road along with a small row of shops, and opposite, a new shopping centre.

Just off Sleaford Road (A15) in the direction of Lincoln is the village hall almost behind The Bull pub. Earlier the church hall, situated behind St John's Church, served in that capacity, until the current village hall was built in the 1970s. The church hall was taken over by the local Scout group (21st Lincoln) in the early 1980s. They had used it as their headquarters. A local benefactor purchased the hall and donated it to the group.

There was a police station on Whitehall Crescent, which was (in June 2012) enlarged and refurbished, it later underwent further work and is now a Nursery. Next to the Nursery is a public library. Also on London Road is a Medical Centre and GP's Surgery.

A 1921 war memorial and Remembrance garden is situated on the eastern side of the junction of the Sleaford, London, and Grantham Roads.

=== St John the Evangelist's Church ===
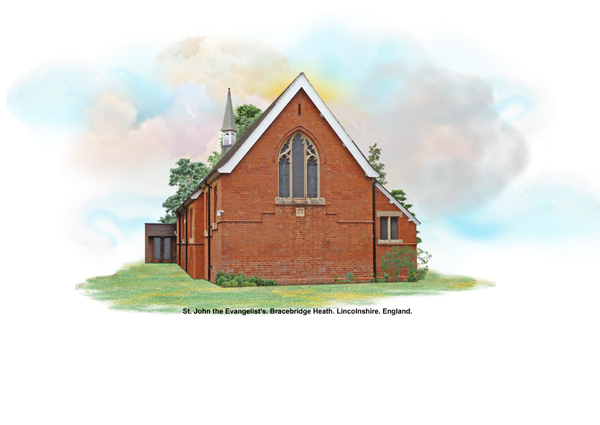
Church of St John The Evangelist's Church, Bracebridge Heath

St John The Evangelist's Church is a former mission church of All Saints Church, Bracebridge. The church was built between 1908 and 1910, the architect being Charles Hodgson Fowler of Durham. It is in the Deanery of Lincoln and remains active for local community.

=== St John's Hospital ===
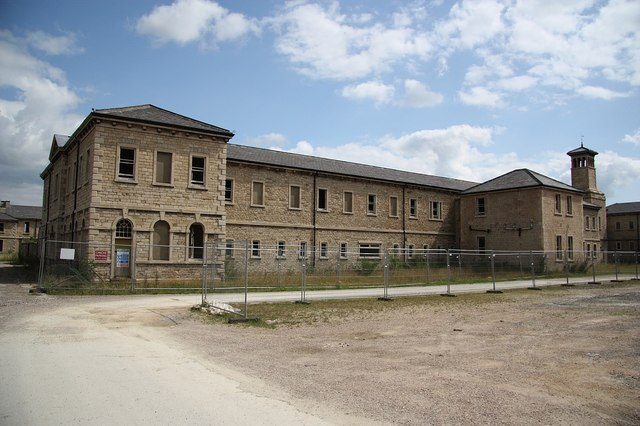
St John's Hospital

St John's Hospital closed in December 1989 and the site has been sold to a property developer who has built 183 luxury homes and apartments there. The original hospital buildings are classified as grade II listed buildings.

=== Pubs ===
Bracebridge Heath has three pubs. The Blacksmiths Arms, now shortened to 'The Blacksmiths', on the site of the Victorian blacksmith's shop and beerhouse built, opened and run by the family of William Green, a Harmston farmer, in 1852. It stands at the point where London Road divides into the Sleaford Road (A15) and the Grantham Road (A607). It has recently been refurbished and re-opened after standing derelict for some years. Directly opposite this on the western side of Grantham Road is the John Bull, since 2007 renamed 'The Bull'. Its first spirit license was granted to Thomas Spain, 16 October 1849. The Homestead is a late-1990s building conversion of one of the former hospital buildings, which served originally as the hospital Superintendent's residence, built in 1906 for Dr. Thomas Leonard Johnston.

== Facilities ==
The village is home to the headquarters of the local Area Health Authority. It is based around the home of one of the Newsum family, (formerly Wood Merchants). Arthur Crookes Newsum built 'Cross O'Cliffe Court' in 1908/9.

To the west of London road (A15), is an area of open land which was known locally as 'The Hillies'. Although privately owned (by the church), it served for many years as unofficial common land, used for sheep grazing, dog walking and for a rough and ready village football pitch. A public footpath which forms part of The Viking Way runs through it. For several years it has been given over to crop growing.

== Sport and leisure ==
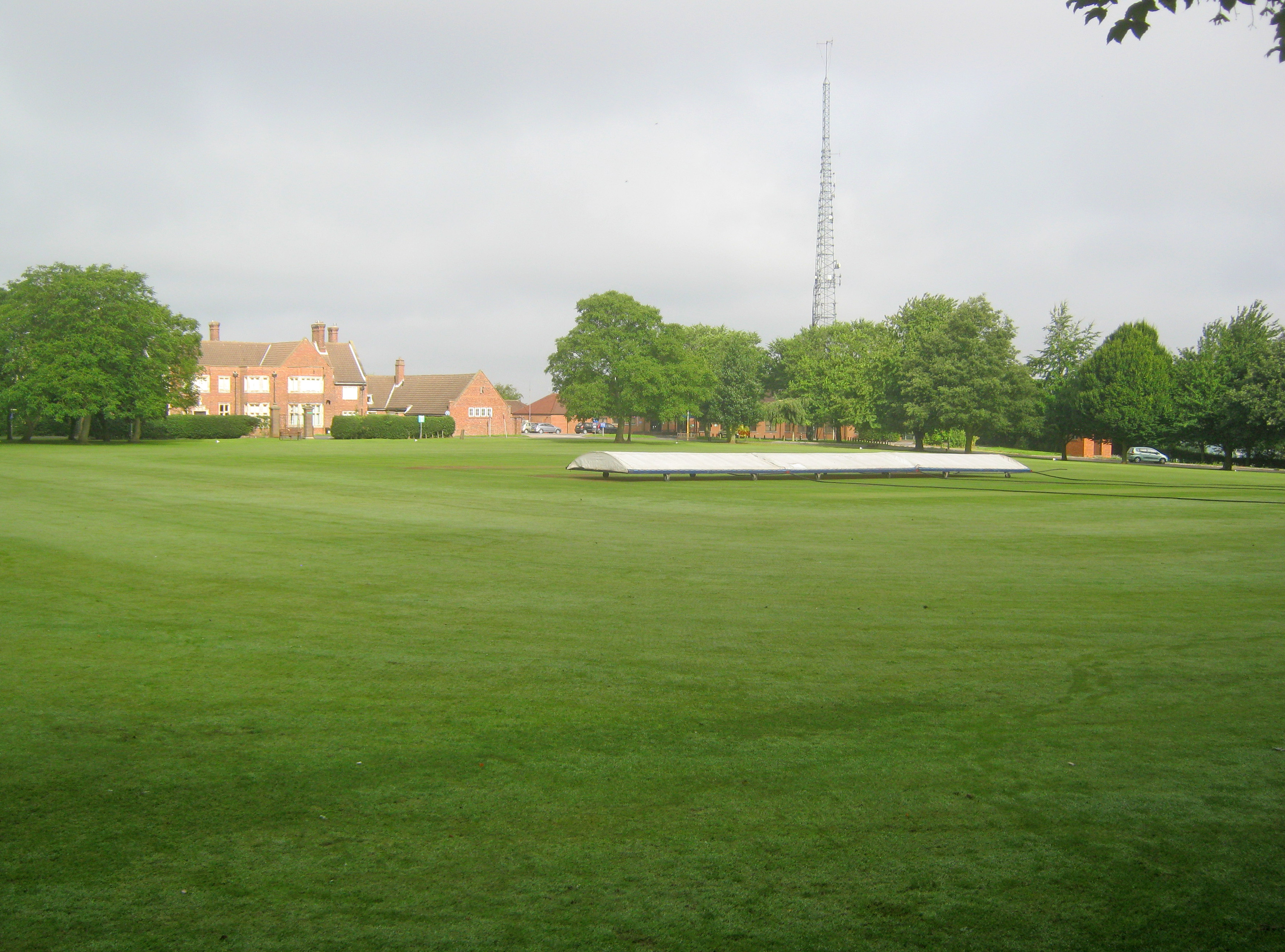
Bracebridge Heath Cricket Club (2012)

Bracebridge Heath Cricket Club was founded in 1948 and their ground can be found on Cross O'Cliff Court. The club has 12 Lincolnshire County Board Premier League championship titles to their name and a recent championship win in the Lincoln & District Sunday League in 2023. Bracebridge Heath field four senior teams: The 1st team compete in the Lincolnshire County Board Premier League (a designated ECB Premier League), a 2nd team in the Lincolnshire County League and two Sunday teams compete in the Lincoln & District League. They also have an established junior training section that play competitive cricket in the Lincoln Youth Cricket League.

The Viking Way, a 147 miles (237 km) long footpath from the Humber Bridge to Oakham, runs along the cliff top to the west of the village.

== RAF Bracebridge Heath ==
A Royal Flying Corps (RFC) aerodrome at Bracebridge Heath originally opened in 1916 for use by the Robey-Peters aircraft factory, in the manufacture and flight testing of their own designs and licence-built Sopwith aircraft. . RAF Bracebridge Heath enlarged circa 1919–1920, housed No. 121 Squadron RAF and No. 4 Aircraft Acceptance Park RAF.

In the Second World War, an aircraft repair organisation at Bracebridge Heath, managed by A V Roe and Co Ltd, recovered 'battle damaged' Avro Lancaster bomber parts, which would otherwise have been scrapped, returning them to service and making a contribution to the bomber offensive against Nazi Germany. An MAP B.1 type aircraft hangar from this period survived in 2014.

There was a grade II listed triple-bay Belfast truss aircraft hangar here (built c1917), but this was demolished on safety grounds in 2001. Two other modified and re-clad single-bay Belfast truss hangars survived.
