= Rushden Lakes =

Shopping centre in Rushden, Northamptonshire, England

Coordinates: 52°18′04″N 0°37′28″W

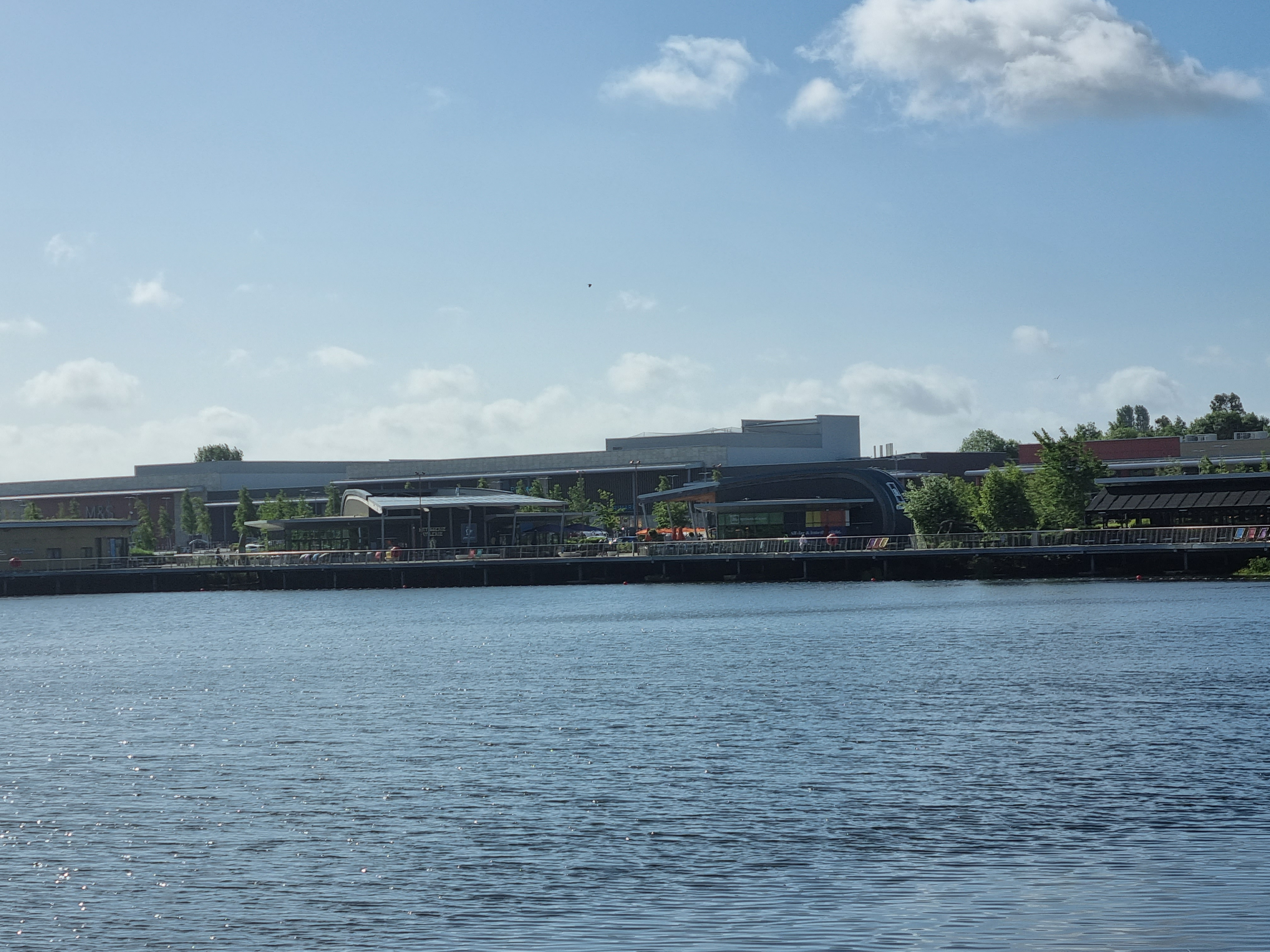

Rushden Lakes is a major shopping and leisure complex in Rushden, Northamptonshire. It first opened in 2017 with further retail and leisure units added later including a Cineworld cinema which opened in 2019. It is situated just off the A45 on the northern outskirts of Rushden. There are around 40 shops predominantly focussing on fashion. The largest retailers are Primark, Frasers and Marks and Spencer. There are over a dozen cafes and restaurants including Bill's, Five Guys, Nando's, Pizza Express and Wagamama.

The Wildlife Trust for Bedfordshire, Cambridgeshire and Northamptonshire have a visitors centre which overlooks the Skew Bridge lake.

== Activities ==
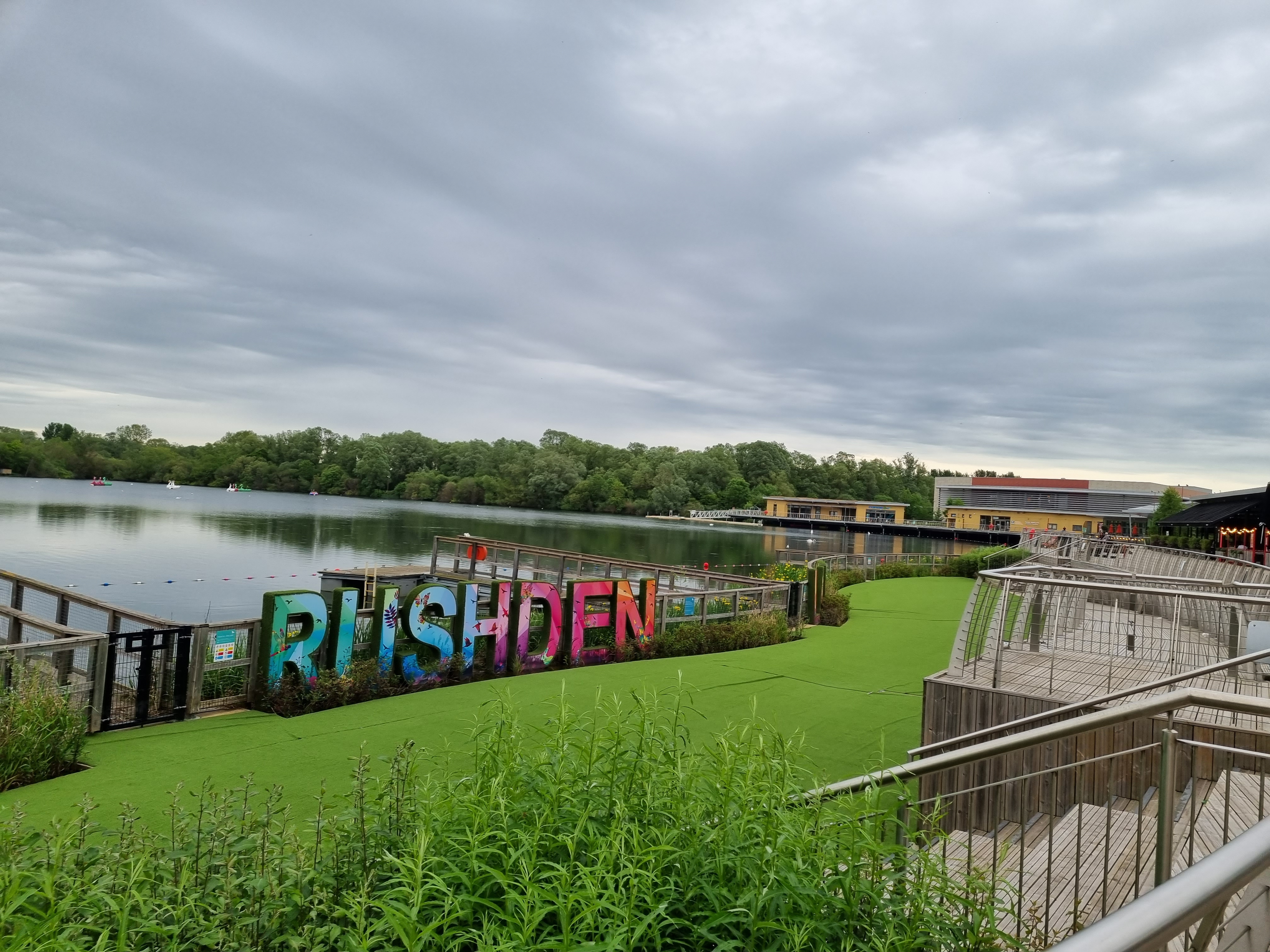

Leisure activity opportunities at Rushden Lakes include:

- Canoe2 - Kayak hire
- Paradise Island Adventure Golf
- Rock-up - Fun climbing
