= Rushden =

Town in Northamptonshire, England

Coordinates: 52.288°N 0.601°W

- Town and Civil Parish
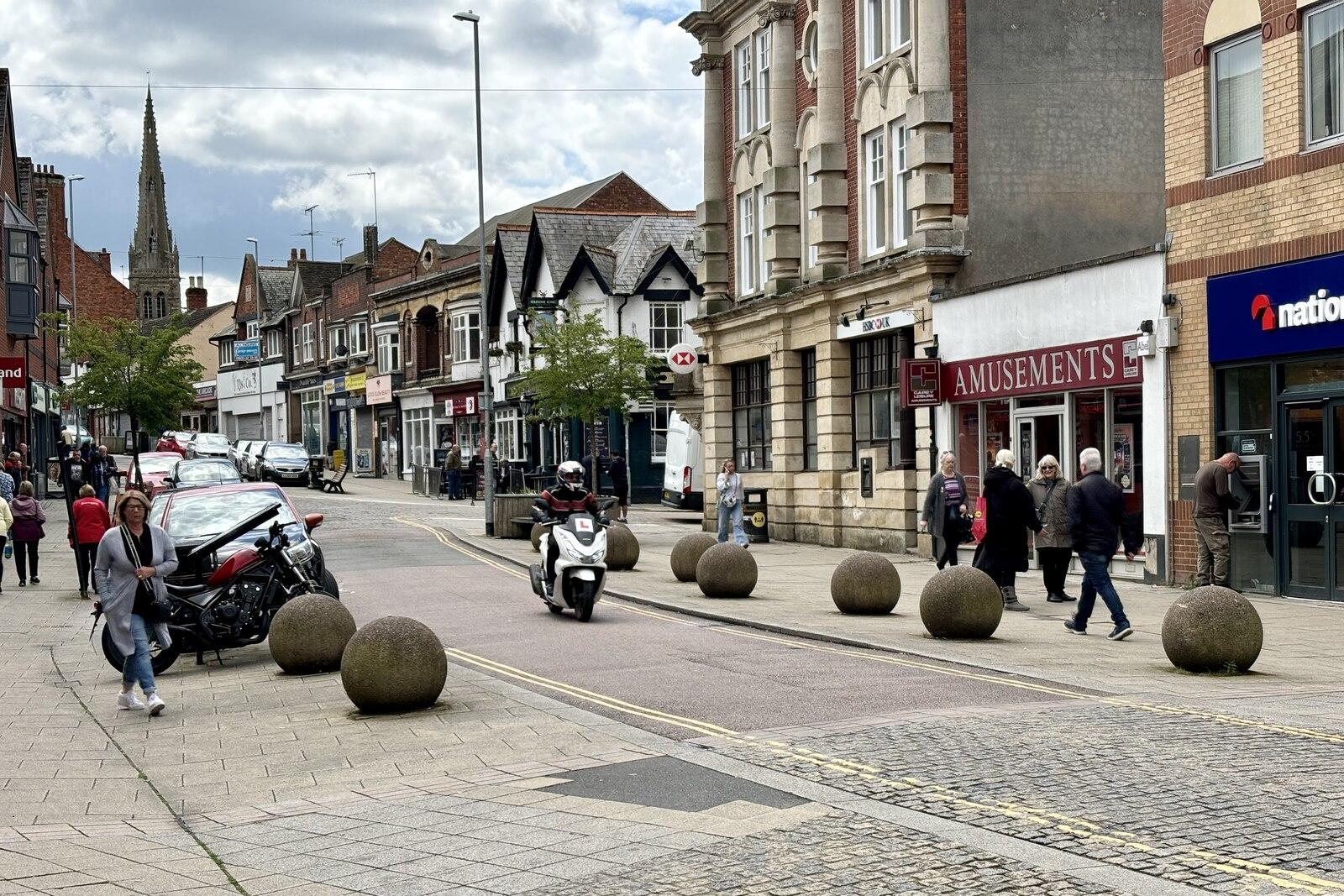
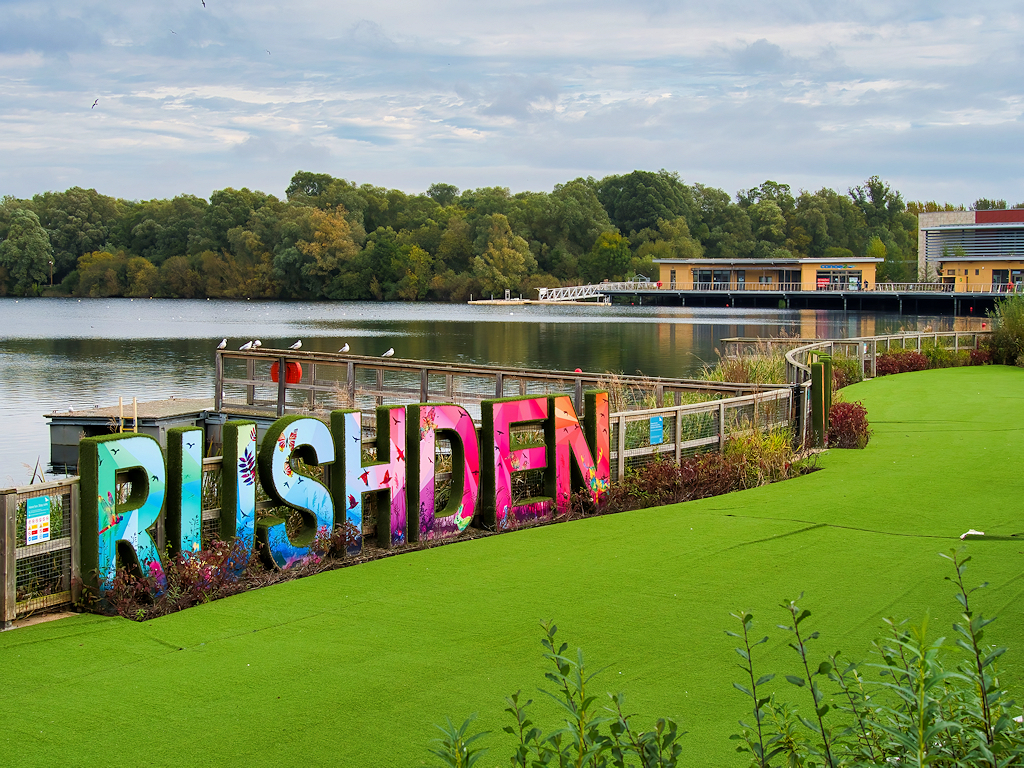
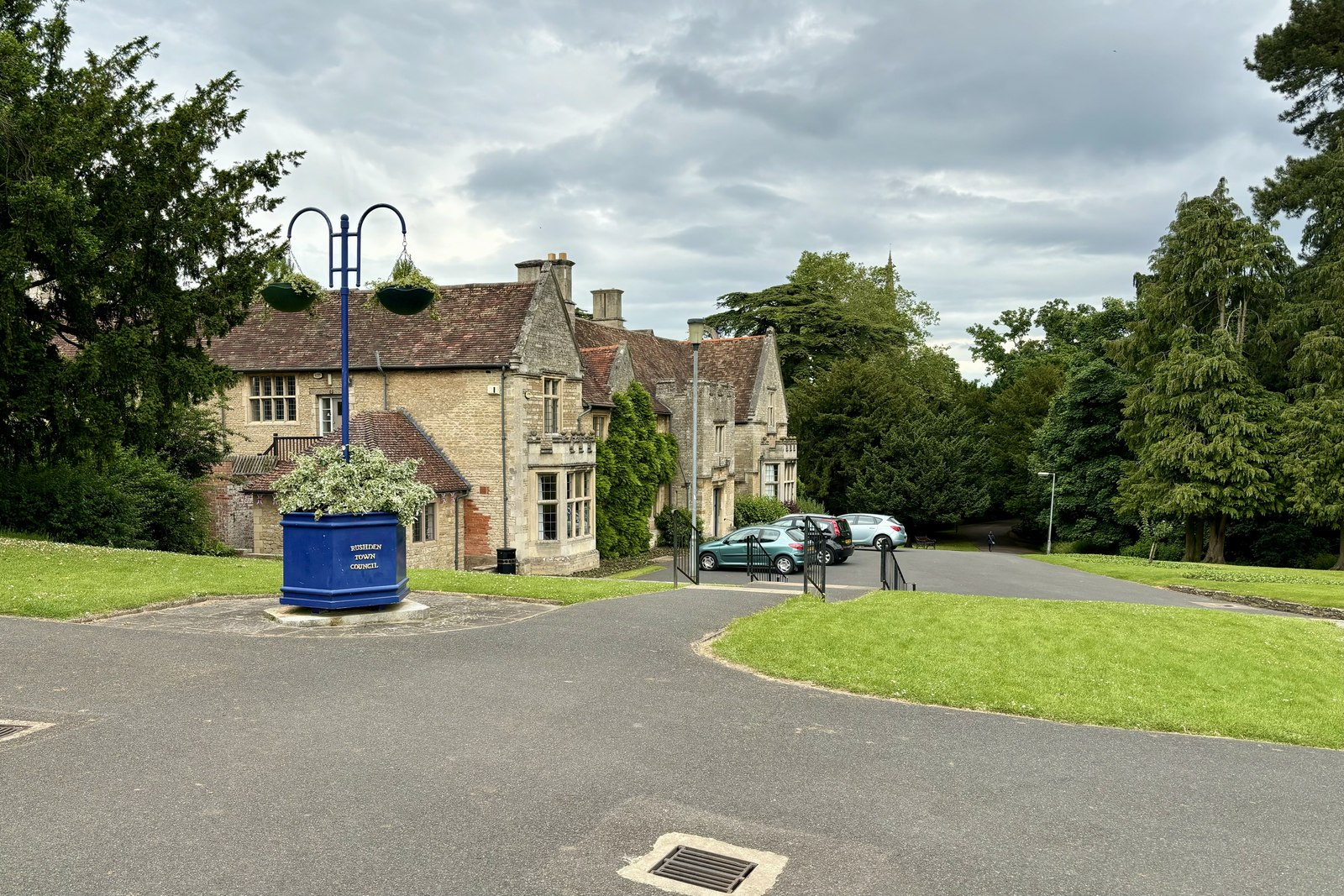
- High Street The Lakes Rushden Hall

- Location within Northamptonshire
- Population: 31,690 (2021 Census)
- OS grid reference: SP955665
- Civil parish: Rushden
- Unitary authority: North Northamptonshire
- Ceremonial county: Northamptonshire
- Region: East Midlands
- Country: England
- Sovereign state: United Kingdom
- Post town: RUSHDEN
- Postcode district: NN10
- Dialling code: 01933
- Police: Northamptonshire
- Fire: Northamptonshire
- Ambulance: East Midlands
- UK Parliament: Wellingborough and Rushden

Rushden is a town and civil parish in the North Northamptonshire district, in the county of Northamptonshire, England, around 18 miles (29 km) east of Northampton. The parish is on the border with Bedfordshire, 12 miles (19 km) north of Bedford.

The parish of Rushden covers an area of some 9,001 acres (36.43 km^{2}). The population of Rushden is 32,038, making it the fifth largest town in the county. The larger urban area, which includes the adjoining town of Higham Ferrers, has a population of 40,865.

== Location ==
Rushden lies on the A6 midway between Bedford and Kettering. The southern limits of the town border on the county of Bedfordshire, and to its north lies the River Nene (locally pronounced Nen) which flows into The Wash. Rushden lies in a small valley, with a stream or brook known as Sidney Brook flowing through the centre of the town. During the late 1960s and 70s this stream was culverted to prevent flash flooding. From whichever way Rushden is approached, the streets and roads can be seen stretching out in the valley, with the spire of St Mary's church prominent above its rooftops.

== Governance ==
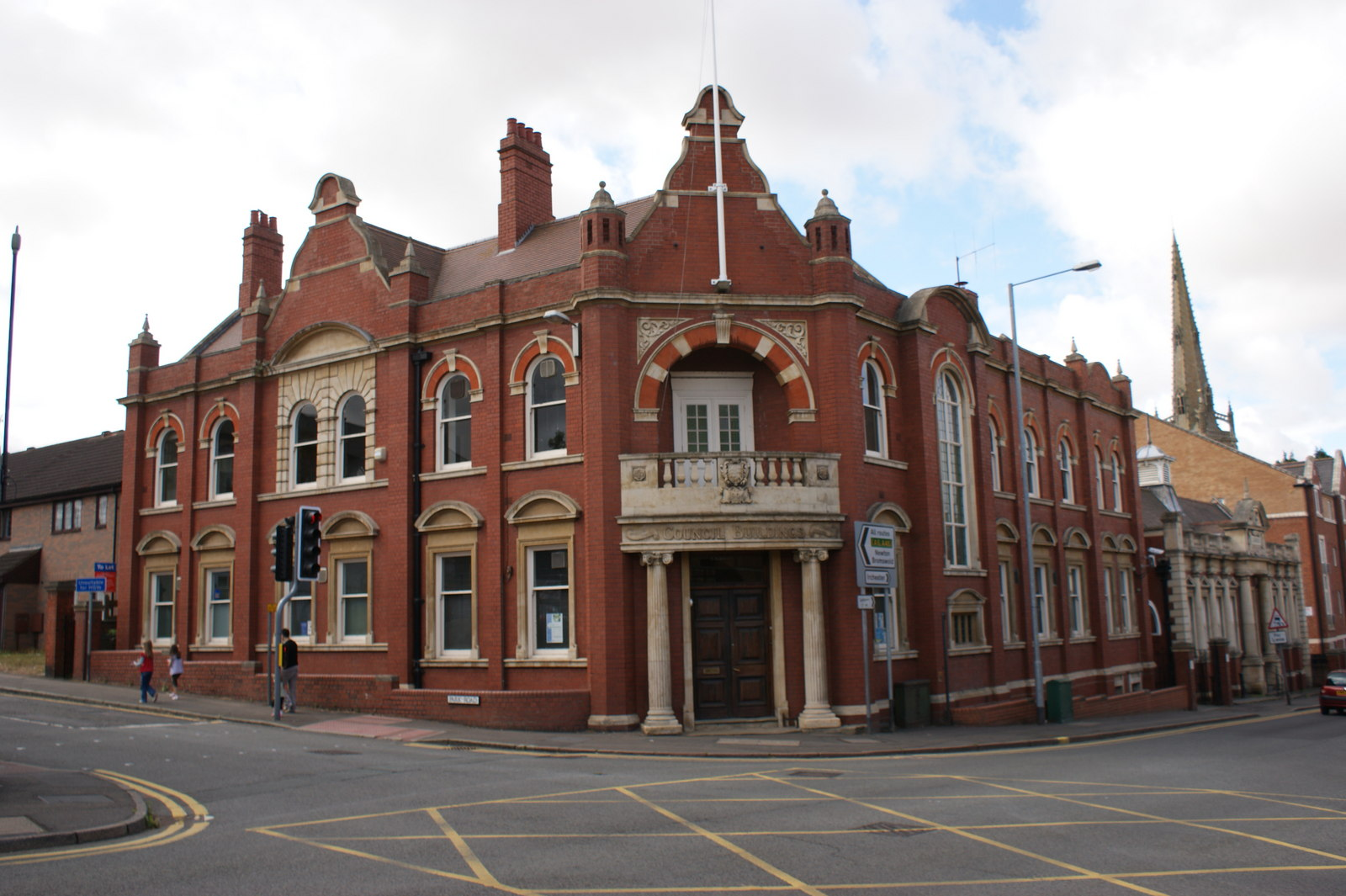
The Council Buildings

Gen Kitchen MP is the local MP representing Wellingborough. As a result of recent electoral changes, Rushden has been divided into five wards for both District and Town Council purposes. With the following re-classifications: Rushden Spencer (formerly North), Rushden Hayden (formerly East), Rushden Bates (formerly South), Rushden Sartoris (formerly South) and Rushden Pemberton (formerly West). Rushden Urban District Council, which was based at the Council Buildings in Newton Road, was the local authority until 1974 when the town became part of East Northamptonshire.

Since local government reorganisation in 2020 abolished Northamptonshire County Council and the county's seven district councils, the town has become part of the new unitary authority of North Northamptonshire, one of two newly formed unitary authorities in the ceremonial county of Northamptonshire (the other being West Northamptonshire).

== History ==
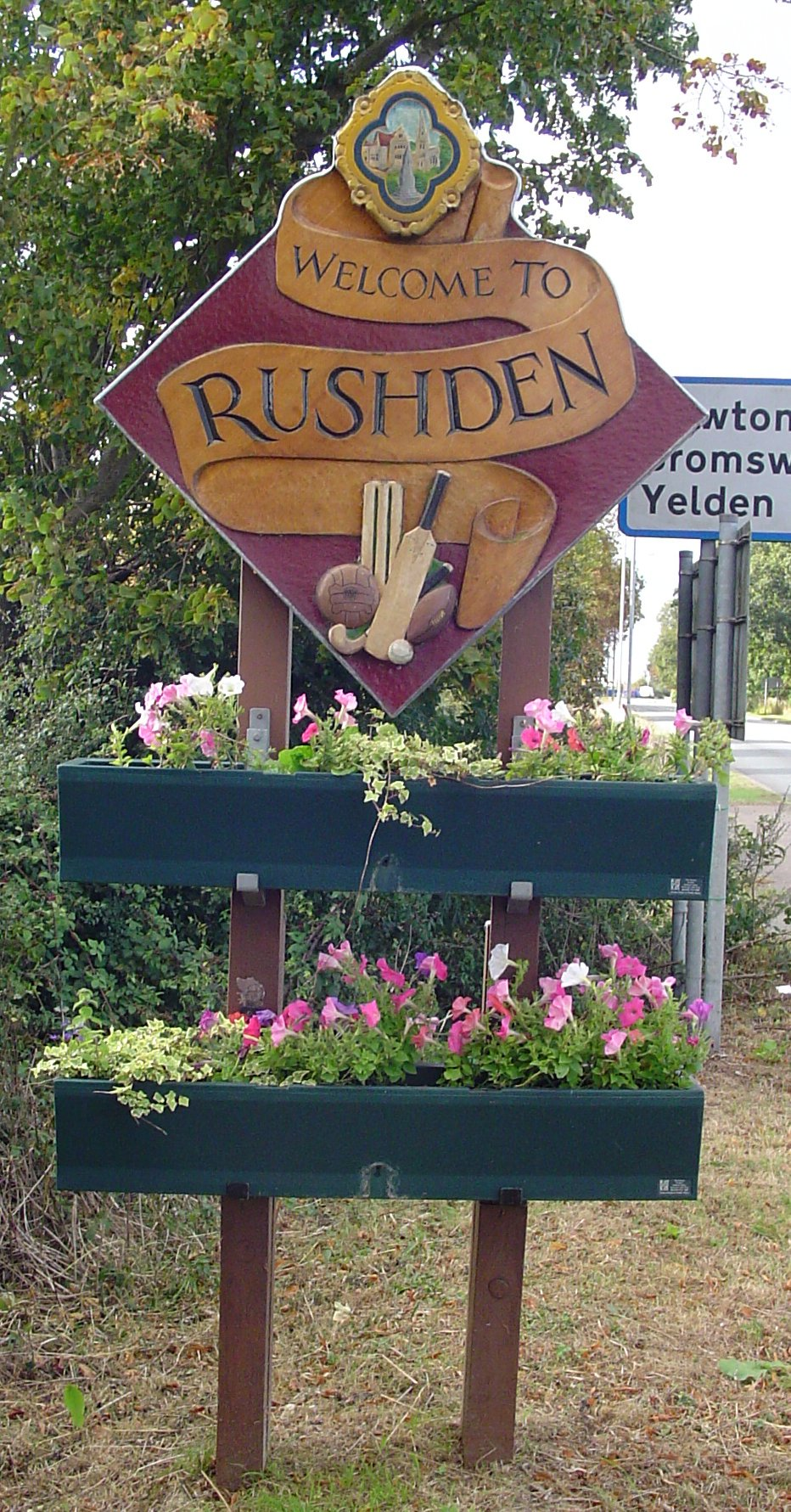
Signpost in Rushden

The name Rushden derives from the Old English riscendenu meaning 'rushy valley'.

Rushden's growth has resulted from a number of industries, including lacemaking and farming, and especially shoemaking and associated trades. In the mid-1900s there were well over 100 boot and shoe factories in Rushden but today there are only four shoemaking companies left in Rushden.

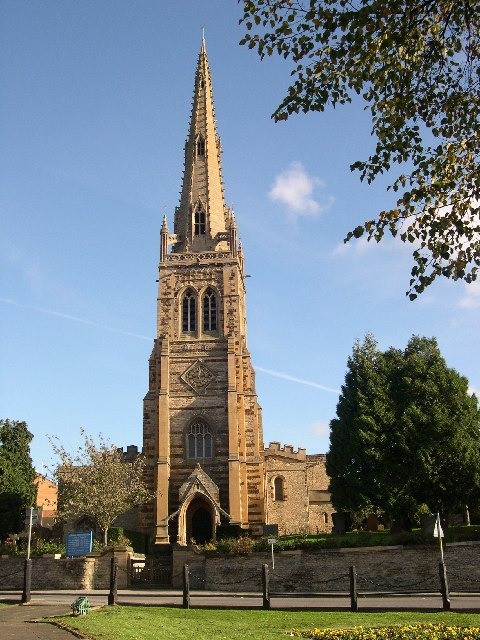
St Mary’s Church

The novelist and short story writer H. E. Bates, who grew up in Rushden, based many of his stories, notably "Love for Lydia", in Rushden, changing its name to Evensford. He recorded the past beauties of the surrounding countryside as he remembered it from the 1910s through to the 1940s, before much was destroyed by developments. He also gives childhood Iglimpses of vanished ways of life of many countryfolk, such as in the short stories, "The Watercress Girl", "The Mower", "The Cowslip Field", and "Great Uncle Crow". He often mentions the leather factories and bootmaking of "Evensford" (Rushden), and how the air in the town was often permeated with the smell of leather and its processing agents.

Historical population
Year	Pop.	±%
1831	1,245	—
1851	1,460	+17.3%
1861	1,748	+19.7%
1871	2,122	+21.4%
1881	3,657	+72.3%
1891	7,443	+103.5%
1901	12,453	+67.3%
1921	13,505	+8.4%
1931	14,248	+5.5%
1951	16,370	+14.9%
1961	17,357	+6.0%
1971	20,158	+16.1%
1981	22,199	+10.1%
1991	23,040	+3.8%
2001	25,849	+12.2%
2011	29,272	+13.2%

One of the most renowned is Sanders and Sanders, who make boots for the British Army and several other defence departments throughout the world. Some of the redundant factories have been converted into flats, and MPs support for government help has been limited. Today, as with many towns in England, industry in the town is varied, and mostly situated in an out-of-town industrial estate. As with the industry, town centre shopping in Rushden has changed considerably although there are still many shops. Rushden has the oldest toy shop in the county. In 1893 a short branch line railway opened linking Rushden and Higham Ferrers with the Midland Main Line. The line was closed in 1959 and dismantled. In 1991 the trackbed was converted into a pocket park.

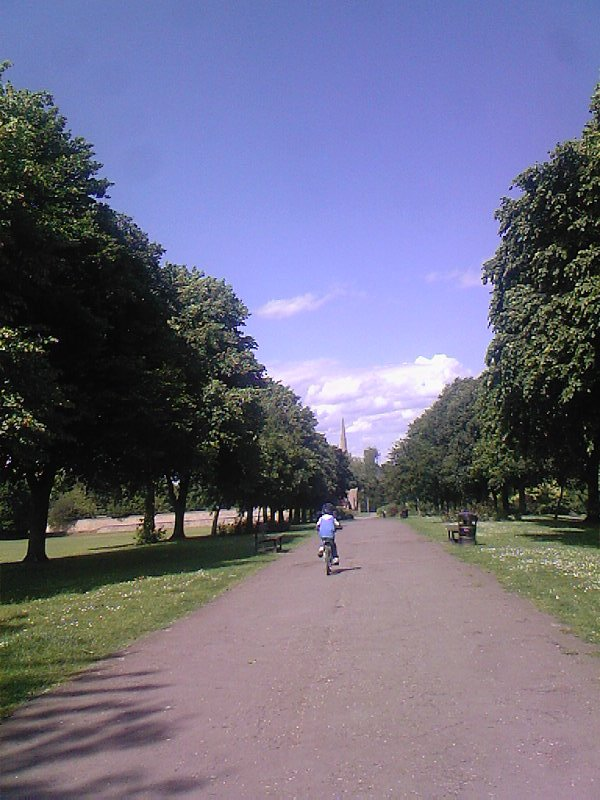
Hall Park with the spire of St Mary's Church in the far distance

The former Rushden railway station is now owned by the Rushden Historical Transport Society, which operates a museum and real ale bar. The society often holds special events, including an annual 3-day transport cavalcade. The society aims to rebuild the branch line from Higham Ferrers to Wellingborough.

There is also a privately owned museum in Rushden which is situated in the town's Hall Park. It is open between the months of May and October.

Rushden Hall is the oldest domestic building in the town, once owned by many families throughout the years including the Sartoris family and the Pembertons family. The hall now functions as the head office of the town council and some rooms are available for hiring. It lies in 32 acres (13 ha) of land which now is a public park (Hall Park).

The 1970s ITV Police Drama series Hunters Walk was filmed on location in Rushden and the surrounding villages.

== Modern times ==
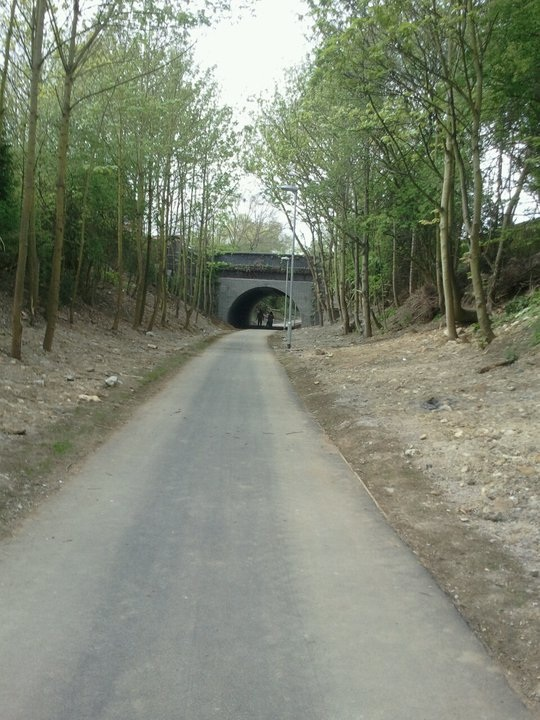
Section of Rushden Greenway, heading under Washbrook Road

In late 2010, Rushden began to undergo a regeneration project, with the aim to making the town centre a more spacious and attractive place to shop. Rushden Splash Pool on Station Road and the Pemberton Centre, slightly out of town were planned to move to a new site to make room for in the town centre from the move of Splash and a knock on move of Alfred Street School to the Site of the Pemberton Centre. Plans were drawn up for a move to Manor Park, an open space out of town to the south side of Rushden. This however was put on hold in 2010 due widespread local opposition and the economic downturn.

In early 2011, improvements to the High Street began with regeneration on the ‘southern gateway’ and a creation of a 'town square' in the middle of the High Street.

Also a greenway cycle and foot path was created joining existing footpaths with a new one along the old railway line through the town. This linked Ferrers School to Rushden town centre and then out of Rushden to Crown Park retail park.

== Retail ==
Rushden has many supermarkets and convenience stores.

=== Rushden Lakes ===
A new £140 million out of town leisure and shopping centre known as Rushden Lakes Shopping Centre opened in July 2017. The development is situated near Waitrose just off the A45, on the site of the former Skew Bridge dry ski slope, also referred to as Rushden Lakes, which had been derelict for some years.

The land was purchased by LXB Retail Properties for £4.5 million in 2011 and the development was later sold to The Crown Estate. When finalised, the development will include a cinema, shops, hotels, visitor centre, restaurants, a leisure centre and a marina, with Marks & Spencer as its flagship store. A link to the River Nene will also be incorporated. The new 244-acre (99 ha) facility will create around 2,000 jobs. Despite opposition from the local councils of Corby, Northampton, Bedford and Kettering, the Rushden Lakes proposal was approved by East Northants Council in October 2012, but the application was automatically referred to the Secretary of State. The Secretary of State, Eric Pickles, approved the planning application and gave the go-ahead for the Rushden Lakes development on 12 June 2014.

Rushden Lakes the first section of the area opened on 28 July 2017, with shop opening on the same day. Further shops opened on both the west and east side of the retail area. In July 2019 work was finished on a multiplex building which included indoor activities and a multiscreen cinema. While the site itself is currently complete there have been plans submitted to build further next to the site and to improve road access from the A45.

== Sports and recreation ==
=== Leisure facilities ===
Rushden has two main leisure facilities, The Pemberton Centre and Splash Pool. Both are managed by Freedom Leisure, as so membership covers both venues. The Pemberton Centre is a large leisure and conference centre including a large hall, conference rooms, sport hall, gym, young person's gym, squash courts and dance studio. The Splash Pool is situated close to the town centre and includes a 25-metre-lane (82 ft) swimming pool with a learner area, beach area and indoor slide.

=== Football ===
The town's former football club, Rushden Town, merged with nearby Irthlingborough Diamonds in 1992 to become Rushden & Diamonds. The new club moved to Nene Park, on the outskirts of Irthlingborough, and played there until going into liquidation in 2011.

A new club AFC Rushden & Diamonds, who play in the Northern Premier League (the 8th division of English Football) was set up in 2011 which has groundshared with Rushden & Higham United at the latter's Hayden Road ground from the 2017–18 season. This is the same stadium where Rushden Town played until 1992.

Junior football is catered for by AFC Rushden & Diamonds Youth which offer football for boys and girls from 4 years of age.

=== Rugby Union ===
Rugby Union is played at Manor Park, the home of Rushden & Higham RUFC. The club was created in October 1951. Over the years the club has played at Chamberlain's Field, near the old Higham railway station, Saffron Meadows, and the John White's ground in Rushden and now plays at Manor Park, Rushden, on pitches rented weekly from the town council.

=== Cricket ===
Rushden and Higham Town Cricket Club have 3 senior XI teams in the Northamptonshire Cricket League, and an established Junior Section, who compete in the Higham & District Youth League. Rushden also field a Sunday XI team who play friendly matches in and around the region.

=== Golf ===
Rushden has two golf courses. A 9-hole course south of Rushden called John Whites also houses a driving range. Rushden Golf Club is a larger 18 hole course to the East of Rushden.

== Media ==
Local news and television programmes are provided by BBC East and ITV Anglia. Television signals are received from the Sandy Heath TV transmitter.

Local radio stations are BBC Radio Northampton, Heart East, Smooth East Midlands (formerly Connect FM) and Beat Route Radio, community based radio station.

The town is served by the local newspaper, Northamptonshire Evening Telegraph.

== Cadets ==
=== Sea Cadets Corps ===
The area has a Sea Cadet Corps, Rushden Unit (No. 639).

=== 858 (Rushden) Squadron, Air Training Corps ===
Rushden has its own Air Cadet Squadron, No 858 (Rushden) Squadron Royal Air Force Air Cadets (formerly the Air Training Corps), based at the Drill Hall on Victoria Road. It is run by officers commissioned in the Royal Air Force Air Cadets, (formerly the Royal Air Force Volunteer Reserve (Training Branch)), assisted by adult Senior NCO’s and Civilian Instructors, all of which are civilian volunteers. The squadron takes part in the Rushden remembrance and armed forces day parades. It gives young people from the ages of 12-20 the opportunity to take part in various events such as shooting, drill, leadership activities, annual camps and volunteering in the local area.

The Squadron is part of South and East Midlands wing, which itself is a part of Central and East Region.

The current Officer Commanding is Flight Lieutenant Colin Harmer.

=== Army Cadet Force ===
Also at the Drill Hall, on Victoria Road, is the Rushden Detachment of the Leicestershire, Northamptonshire and Rutland Army Cadet Force.

== Education ==
Before the single-sex senior schools were merged, the former girls school in Rushden was named "Chichele Girls School" after Henry Chichele who was born in the neighbouring town of Higham Ferrers.

Rushden is home to one secondary school, Rushden Academy. It is part of The East Northamptonshire College together with The Ferrers Specialist Arts College (Higham Ferrers) and Huxlow Academy (Irthlingborough). Rushden has 9 Primary Schools:

South Rushden

- Whitefriars Primary
- Southend Infant
- Southend Junior

North Rushden

- Denfield Park Primary School

Central Rushden

- Alfred Street Junior

East Rushden

- Newton Road Primary (Risdene Academy)
- Newton Road Infant
- Rushden Primary Academy

West Rushden

- Tennyson Road Infants

Higham Ferrers

- Higham Ferrers Infant
- Higham Ferrers Junior
- Henry Chichele Primary

For adult education, Rushden is served by a 'Learning Centre' which is located in the town centre. The Learning Centre is operated by Bedford College, and offers Information Technology, English Language and Mathematics courses.

== Transport ==
=== Rail ===
At present, Rushden is one of the largest towns in the country without an operational railway station. However, there are proposals by The Association of Train Operating Companies to build a new railway station on the Midland Main Line (to the West of Rushden) to be known as Rushden Parkway. This is supported by local transport campaigners. Currently, the nearest railway station is at Wellingborough about five miles (8 km) away, on the Midland Main Line, although no bus service currently links Rushden to Wellingborough station - the X46 bus service stops at Midland Road in Wellingborough about half a mile from the station.

The heritage Rushden, Higham and Wellingborough Railway operates services from Rushden railway station on a short section of railway towards the former Higham Ferrers railway station on the Higham Ferrers branch line.

=== Bus ===
The main routes serving Rushden are Stagecoach services 50/49 with connections to Kettering and Bedford and the X46/47 providing links with Raunds, Wellingborough, Irchester and Northampton. There are also services that connect Rushden to the small villages in North Bedfordshire and has its own bus service within the town, the Rushden-Higham link. The Link runs 3 routes and are:

Route	Destination	Via	Notes	Operated by
1	Irthlingborough	Washbrook Rd, Crown Park, Higham	Hourly from 09:30–14:30.	Expressline
2	Kingsmead Park	Upper Queens St, Newton Rd, Barrington Rd	Hourly from 09:30–14:30.	Expressline
3	Park Ave	Masefield Drive, Melloway, Highfield,	Hourly from 10:05–14:05.	Expressline

=== Air ===
Several major UK airports are only within 60 miles or 1 hour driving distance of the town, including Luton, East Midlands, Birmingham and Stansted.

=== Road ===
In terms of roads, Rushden is bypassed by the A6 which has connections to Kettering (Northbound) and Bedford and Luton (Southbound). The A45 connects Rushden to the East coast as well as Northampton and the M1 motorway westbound.

== Notable people ==
- H. E. Bates (1905–1974) — novelist
- Thomas Britton (1644–1714) — concert promoter
- Joe Ekins (1923–2012) — World War II trooper, defeated German tank ace Michael Wittmann
- Sidney King (1885–1972) — English cricketer
- Richard Peck (b. 1937) — British Army major-general and first-class cricketer
- James Richardson (b. 1974) — darts player
- Walter Tull (1888–1918) — professional footballer and possibly the first black/mixed race regular infantry officer in the British Army in World War I, lodged at 26 Queen Street, Rushden, where a blue plaque has been placed; played for Northampton Town
- Bernard Vann (1887–1918) — World War I Victoria Cross recipient
- The Fierce and the Dead (2010-present) — rock band from Rushden
- Jim Walding (1937–2007) — Canadian politician
- Matt Stevens (b. 1975) - English Musician

== Nearby settlements ==
Bedford, Burton Latimer, Chelveston, Corby, Finedon, Higham Ferrers, Irchester, Irthlingborough, Kettering, Milton Keynes, Newton Bromswold, Northampton, Oundle, Podington, Raunds, Riseley, St Neots, Thrapston, Wellingborough, Wollaston, Wymington
