= Burghley Park Cricket Club =

Cricket club in Stamford, Lincolnshire, England

Coordinates: 52.64676°N 0.47179°W

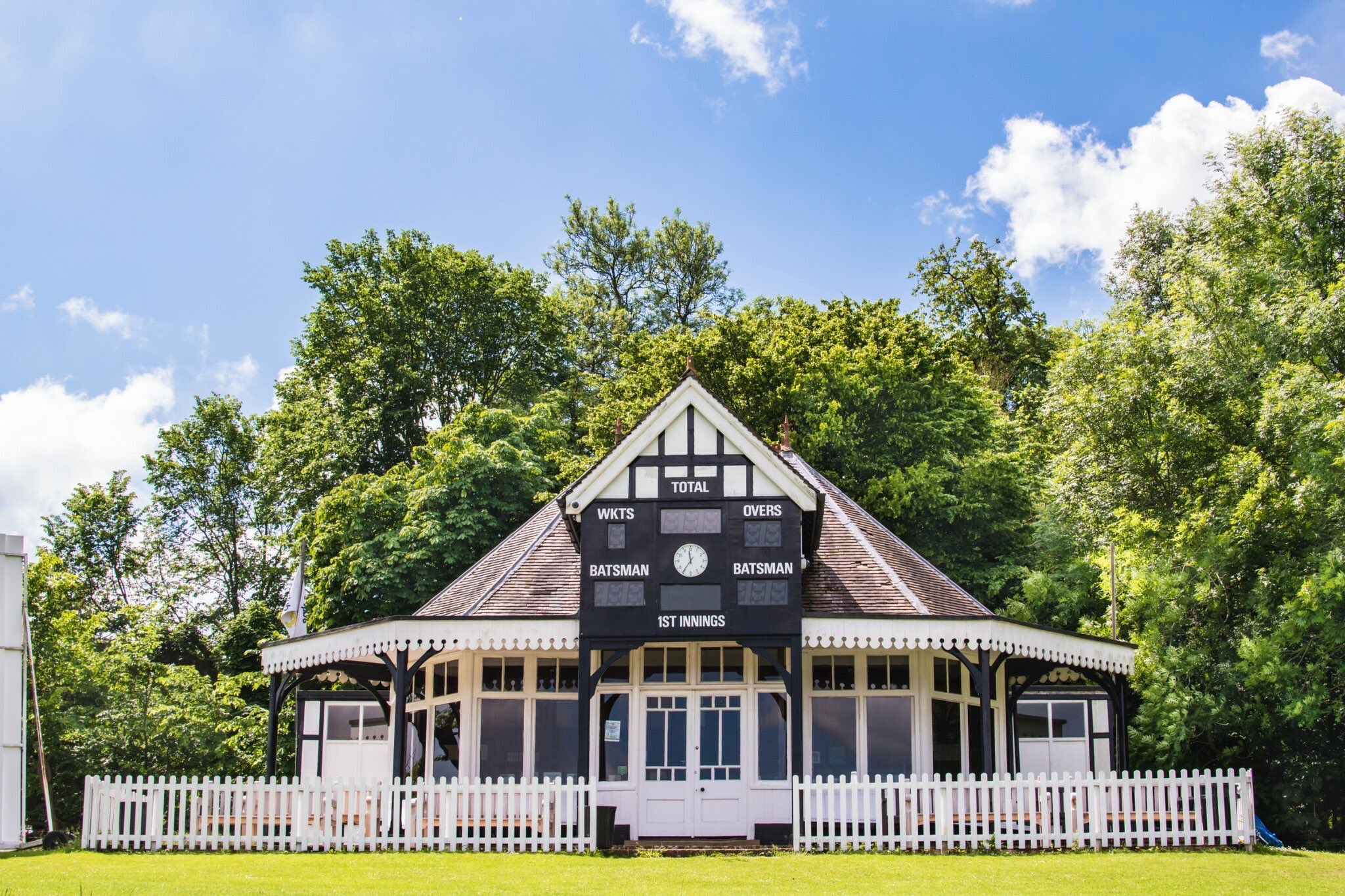
Burghley Park Cricket Club pavilion

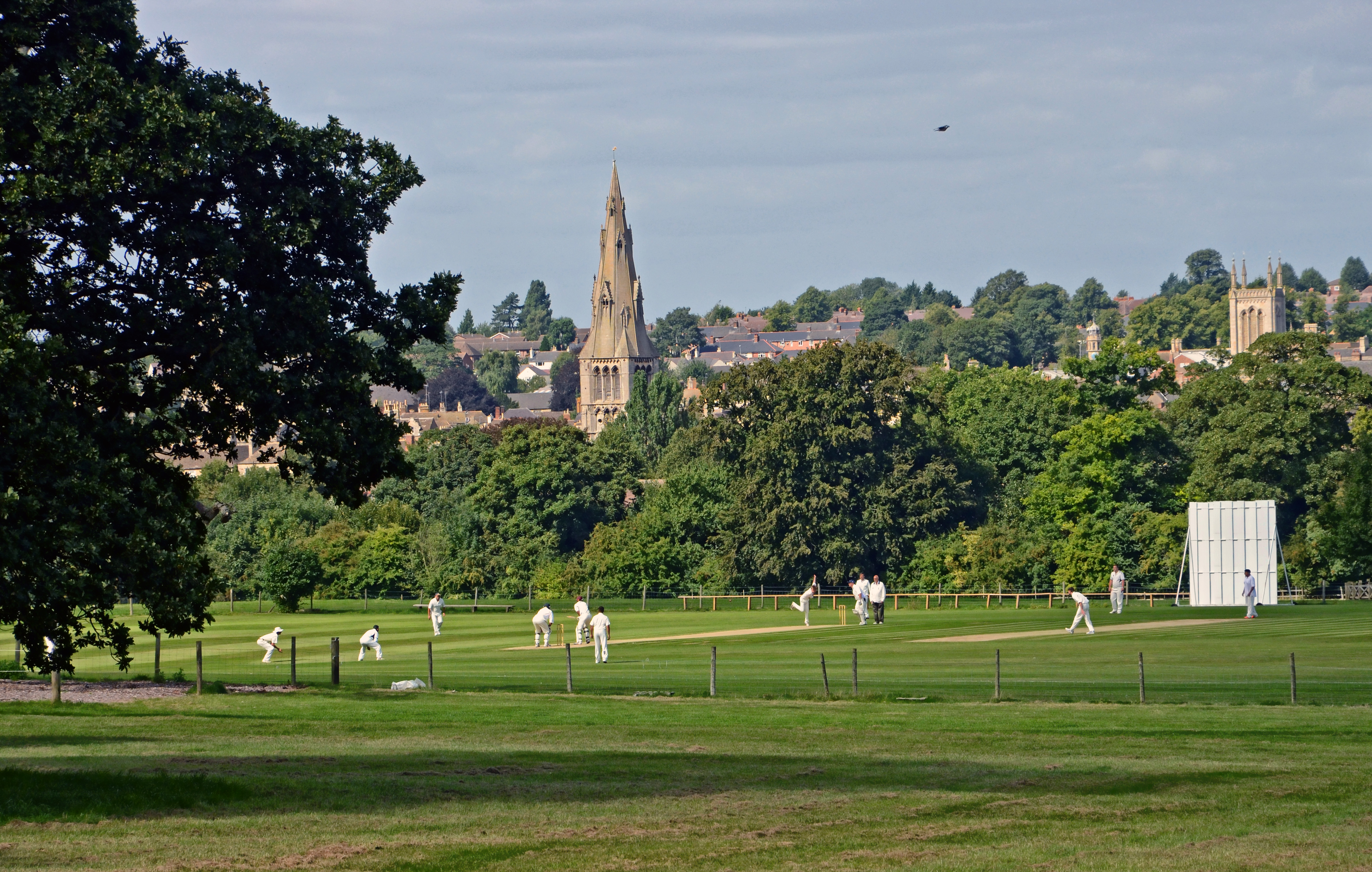
A 2013 match with the town of Stamford beyond

Burghley Park Cricket Club is set in the park of Burghley House near Stamford, Lincolnshire. Its pavilion dates from 1892.

Lincolnshire County Cricket Club played Minor Counties Championship matches at Burghley Park from 1928 to 1990.

John Furley (1847 – 1909) was a club captain. W. G. Grace played at the club early in his career.

The club's 1st XI currently competes in the ECB Lincolnshire Premier League
