= Abbey Lawn =

Recreation ground in Bourne, Lincolnshire, England

Coordinates: 52°46′01″N 0°22′22″W

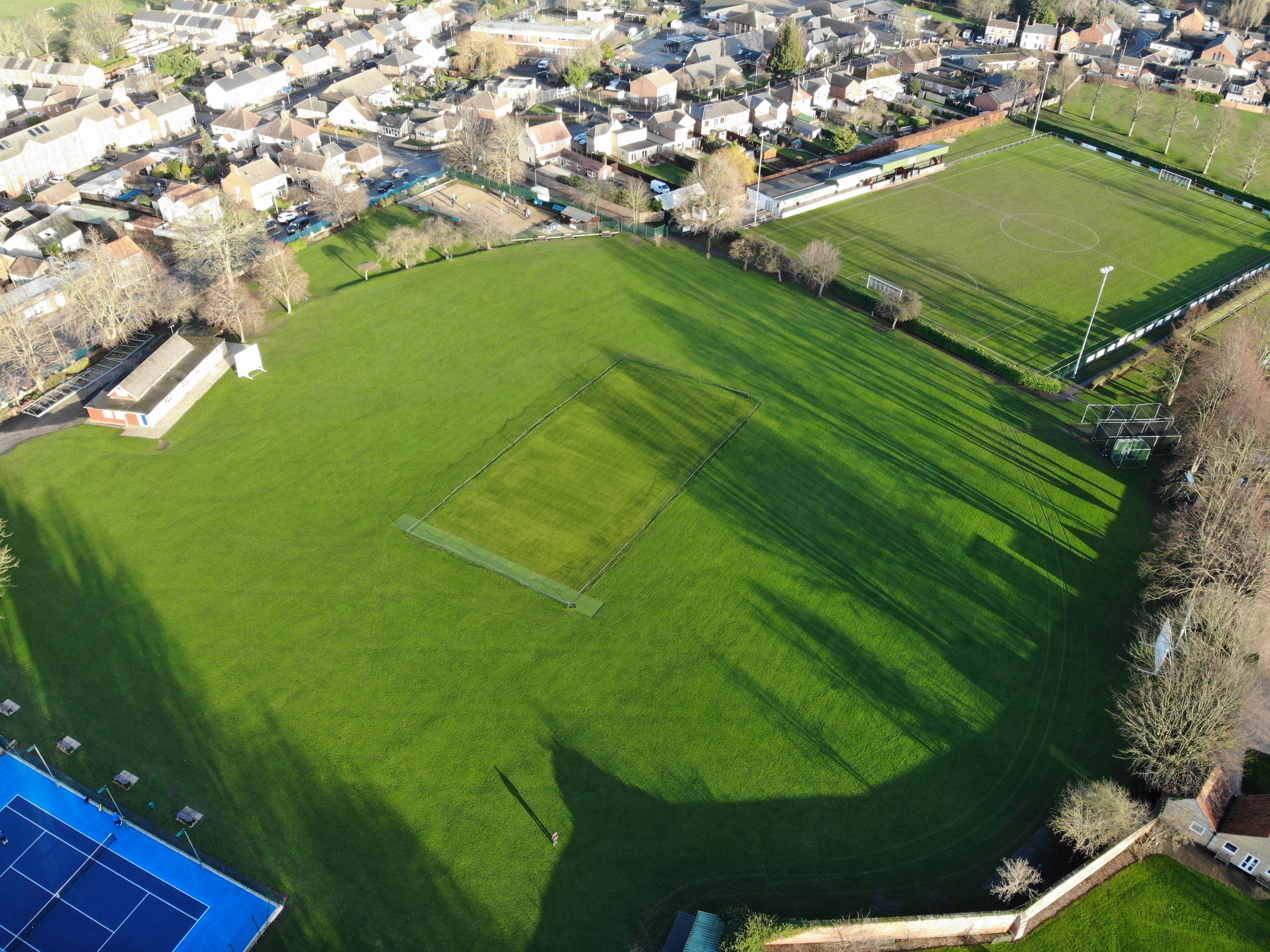
Bourne Abbey Lawn, home of Bourne Cricket Club and Bourne Town Football Club

The Abbey Lawn in Bourne, Lincolnshire, England, is a centrally located space used as the principal recreation ground in the town. The cricket, tennis, bowls, pétanque, and football clubs play their home fixtures here. The hockey club practices here, though it now plays its fixtures on an all-weather pitch elsewhere. "The Lawn" is the site of the Bourne Cricket Club and its associated facilities.

== Origins ==
Though all or most of the land once formed part of the estate of the canons of Bourne Abbey and the swimming pool originated as one of their fish ponds, the present form of the Abbey Lawn and its name derive from the 18th century development of a sheep lawn as an adjunct of the house built by George Pochin, the then lord of the manor of Bourne Abbots. His house was on the site of the claustral buildings of the monastic abbey which had been dissolved in 1536. A sheep lawn was among the gentry, the equivalent of an aristocrat's deer park.

While the part of the Abbey Church which had been used by the parish was retained, the buildings formerly used by the canons were demolished wholly or partially except where a current use could be found for them. Much of the site was therefore vacant around the period of landowner prosperity and investment which arose in relation to the agricultural enclosures of the 1766 Act of Parliament which related to most of the parish of Bourne. Pochin's house was known as 'The Abbey' or 'Abbey House' so that the associated sheep lawn was known as the Abbey Lawn. The house was demolished in 1879.

== History ==
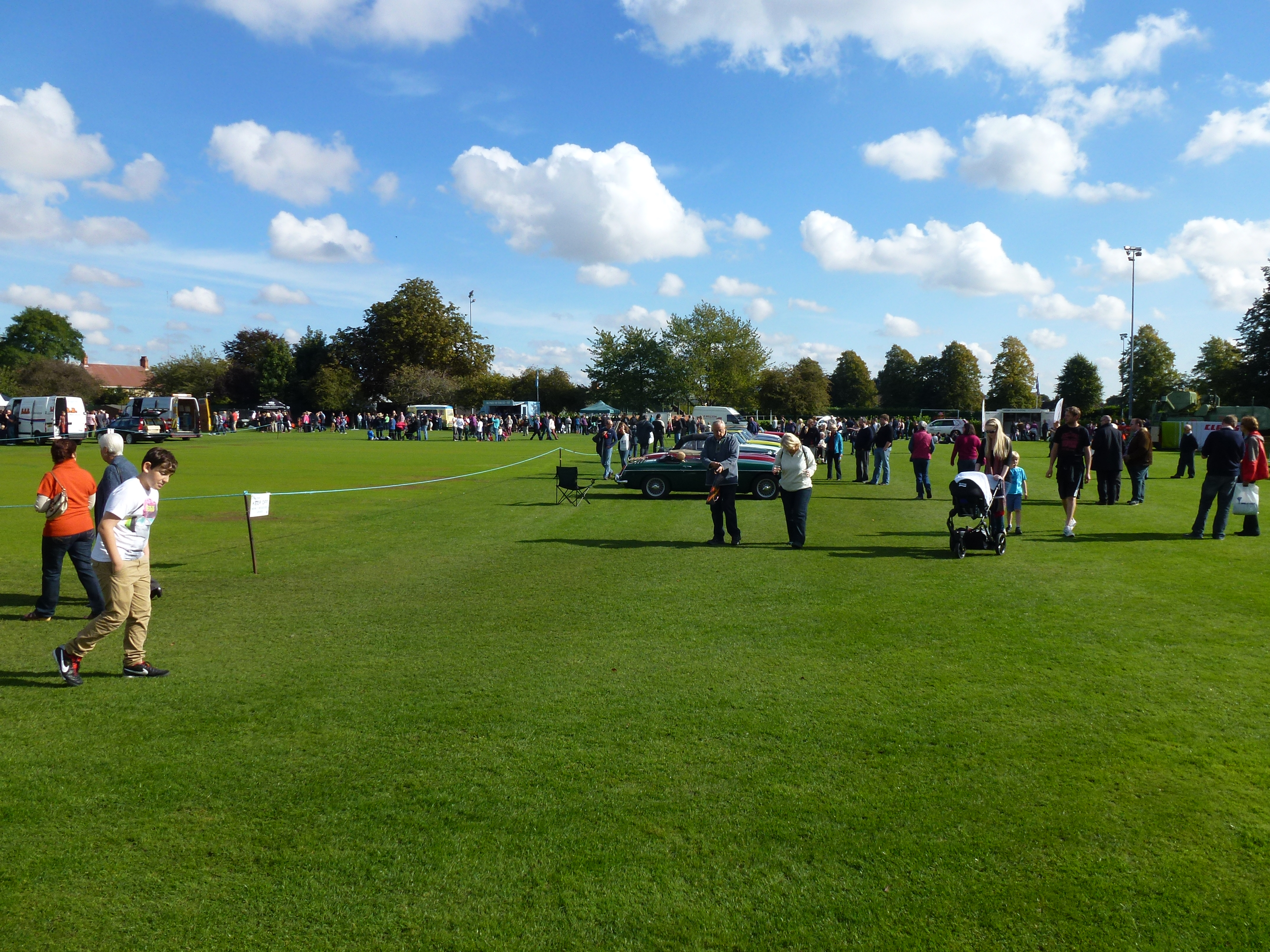
BRM day, 7 October 2012 The sports field was host to catering and trade stands marking 50 years since the company won the Formula 1 constructor's championship.

The grounds of the former house were remained and between 1931 and 1934 they were purchased by Bourne United Charities, at a cost of £700 (to which the cricket club made a token contribution of £20). The grounds were subsequently developed for sports, by for the benefit of the townspeople.

Horace Stanton, a prominent local official on 20 North Street (demolished 1990), was commemorated with a memorial garden in 1983 (six years after his death). The garden was subsequently neglected, with no plaque remembering its dedication. It was removed in 2009 during a redevelopment project.

A skatepark had long been proposed to be built on the site, although there was opposition from locals and conservationists. It was given planning permission in 2017, having been named 'Dimension Skatepark' the year before. Following the money being raised in 2020, it was opened in 2023.
