= Brumby Hall Cricket Ground =

Cricket ground in England

Coordinates: 53°34′59.57″N 0°39′28.35″W

Scunthorpe and Appleby Frodingham Works Cricket Club Ground
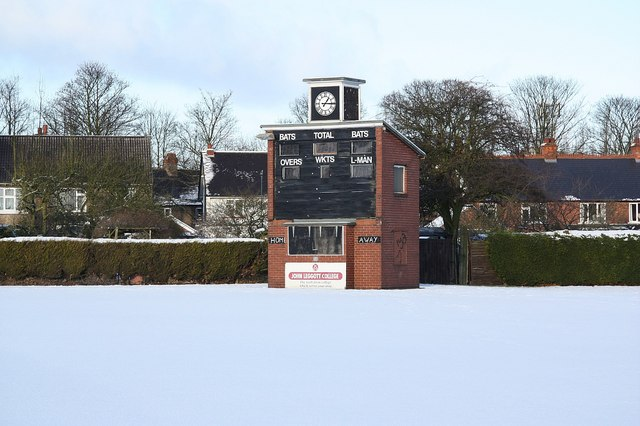

Ground information
- Location: Scunthorpe, Lincolnshire
- Establishment: 1925 (first recorded match)

Team information
Lincolnshire	(1925-1980 & 1987)
Minor Counties North	(1975)
- As of 18 August 2010; Source: Ground profile

Scunthorpe and Appleby Frodingham Works Cricket Club Ground is a cricket ground in Scunthorpe, Lincolnshire. The first recorded match on the ground was in 1925 when Lincolnshire first played at the ground in the Minor Counties Championship against the Nottinghamshire Second XI. From 1925, the ground hosted 49 Minor Counties Championship matches, the last of which came against Staffordshire. In addition, the ground has also hosted a single MCCA Knockout Trophy match, which came in 1987 when Lincolnshire played Durham.

The ground also held a single List-A match in 1975, when Minor Counties North played Yorkshire in the Benson and Hedges Cup.

In local domestic cricket, the ground is the home of Appleby Frodingham Cricket Club who play in the Yorkshire ECB County Premier League. The cricket club is part of a larger body called the Appleby-Frodingham Works Athletic Club, which is associated with Corus Group and was originally created by Appleby-Frodingham Steel Company.
