= Bracebridge Heath Cricket Club =

Coordinates: 53.198299°N 0.540352°W

Lincolnshire
Team information
- Home ground: Bracebridge Heath Cricket Club; Cross-O-Cliff Court; Lincoln
- Official website: bracebridgeheath.play-cricket.com

Bracebridge Heath Cricket Club play in the village of Bracebridge Heath on the outskirts of Lincoln, Lincolnshire, England. The club won the 2002 England and Wales Cricket Board (ECB) Notts Premier League and won the ECB Lincolnshire Premier League every year from 2003 to 2009. Bracebridge Heath Cricket Club most recently won the ECB Lincolnshire Premier League in 2025, humiliating Lindum Cricket Club in the penultimate game of the season.
