= Northamptonshire Cricket League =

EBC Premier League

- Countries: England
- Administrator: ECB
- Format: Limited Overs
- First edition: 1999 (ECB Premier League)
- Tournament format: League
- Number of teams: 10 (ECB Premier Division)
- Current champion: Finedon Dolben CC
- Most successful: Finedon Dolben CC (16 titles)
- Website: https://ncl.play-cricket.com/

The Hevey Building Supplies Northamptonshire Cricket League is the top level of competition for recreational club cricket in Northamptonshire, England, and since 1999 has been a designated ECB Premier League. The league headquarters is based in Wellingborough.

Although the league primarily serves Northamptonshire, it also has member clubs from the surrounding counties of Bedfordshire, Buckinghamshire, Cambridgeshire and Leicestershire.

The competing teams in 2020 were intended to be: Brigstock, Brixworth, Desborough Town, Finedon Dolben, Geddington, Horton House, Northampton Saints, Old Northamptonians, Oundle Town, Overstone Park, Peterborough Town, and Rushden and Higham Town. The 2020 competition was cancelled because of the COVID-19 pandemic. A replacement competition was organised for the later part of the season when cricket again became possible, but with the winners not to be regarded as official league champions.

== Winners ==
- Champions 1999–2018
  Year	Club
  1999	Finedon Dolben
  2000	Finedon Dolben
  2001	Finedon Dolben
  2002	Finedon Dolben
  2003	Finedon Dolben
  2004	Northants CCC Academy
  2005	Northants CCC Academy
  2006	Finedon Dolben
  2007	Finedon Dolben
  2008	Northants CCC Academy
  2009	Finedon Dolben
  2010	Finedon Dolben
  2011	Finedon Dolben
  2012	Peterborough Town
  2013	Peterborough Town
  2014	Peterborough Town
  2015	Rushden Town
  2016	Old Northamptonians
  2017	Old Northamptonians
  2018	Finedon Dolben
- Champions 2019-present
  Year	Club
  2019	Peterborough Town
  2020	COVID-19 pandemic
  2021	Peterborough Town
  2022	Finedon Dolben
  2023	Finedon Dolben
  2024	Finedon Dolben
  2025	Finedon Dolben
  2026	Finedon Dolben

== Premier Division performance by season from 1999 ==
Key
Gold	Champions
Blue	Left League
Red	Relegated

Performance by season, from 1999
Club	1999	2000	2001	2002	2003	2004	2005	2006	2007	2008	2009	2010	2011	2012	2013	2014	2015	2016	2017	2018	2019	2020	2021	2022	2023	2024	2025	2026
Bedford Town	?	6	5	3	4	3	12																					
Brigstock																				10	7		6	4	2	4		
Brixworth	?	4	9	7	6	10	10	12			11	10	4	6	6	10	8	7	6	8	9		10					
Burton Latimer									10	11	10	11	11	11	10	12												
Desborough Town						11	8	11	6	8	12										11		8	8	5	5	10	
Finedon Dolben	1	1	1	1	1	2	4	1	1	2	1	1	1	3	2	6	4	3	4	1	2		2	1	1	1	1	1
Geddington																	12		9	9	8		3	5	8	8	5	2
Horton House	?	7	10	8	10	9	11	8	12				9	12	11	7	11	10	8	4	10		11					
Irthlingborough Town	?	10	12					7	7	12																		
Kettering Town																											9	
Kislingbury Temperance																								7	6	7	6	7
Loddington & Mawsley																												10
Northampton Saints	?	9	8	11	8	4	2	2	5	6	2	3	2	2	7	8	3	9	7	5	5							
Northamptonshire Academy (Note: Northamptonshire Academy withdrew from league cricket after the 2012 season.)	?	2	3	6	2	1	1	3	4	1	7	8	7	9														
Old Northamptonians	?	8	4	2	5	6	3	6	3	5	4	4	6	4	3	5	5	1	1	2	3		4	3	7	9	8	8
Old Wellingburians	?	11	11	12																								
Oundle Town															8	4	7	11	5	7	4		5	6	3	2	3	4
Overstone Park																							9	9	10			6
Peterborough Town	?	3	6	4	3	5	7	4	2	3	6	2	3	1	1	1	2	2	3	3	1		1	2	4	3	2	5
Rothwell Town			7	10	11	12																						
Rushden Town (Note: Rushden Town entered into a merger after the 2018 season and became Rushden and Higham Town.)					7	7	9	10	9	4	3	9	12			3	1	4	10	6								
Rushden and Higham Town																					6		7	10		6	7	9
Rushton							5	9	11	7	9	5	8	5	4	2	6	5	2	wd								
Stony Stratford				5	9	8	6	5	8	9	8	6	10	7	9	11	9	8	12								4	3
Wellingborough Town	?	5	2	9	12							12		8	12			12										
Wollaston										10	5	7	5	10	5	9	10	6	11	11	12				9	10		
References																						(Note: Coronavirus pandemic forced a reduction in league activity - halving the number of matches played.)						
