= Lincolnshire Premier League =

Club cricket league in England

Lincolnshire County Board Premier League
- Countries: England
- Format: Limited Overs
- First edition: 2000
- Latest edition: 2025
- Tournament format: Cricket League
- Number of teams: 10
- Most successful: Bracebridge Heath CC (13 titles)
- Website: Play Cricket Site

The Lincolnshire Premier League (referred to in some sources as Lincolnshire County Board Premier League) was the top level of competition for club cricket in Lincolnshire, England between 2000 and 2025, the league ended in 2025 as part of the single league restructuring in Lincolnshire and the new Lincolnshire Premier Cricket League was formed.

The league was created in the year 2000 as part of the full restructuring of club cricket by the ECB. Each county was given the chance to create a premier league as part of the national restructuring. Discussions took place between the 2 leagues in the county, who were independent of the Lincolnshire Cricket Board but they came to no agreement. The Lincolnshire Cricket Board decided to form the premier league and a working partnership was formed between the two leagues, where all 3 leagues would stay independent but the top 5 clubs from each league would form the first season. Each year the winners of the 2 leagues would be invited to be promoted to the Premier League and the leagues would accept the bottom 2 clubs back into their structure.The leagues all play 50 over games and have featured both overseas, county and test cricketers.

The league had just one division for its entirety, and is fed by the Lincolnshire County Cricket League which covers the north of the county, and the South Lincolnshire and Border League which covers the south of the county. Clubs in the league are also eligible to play in the 2 premier national club cricket competitions, The ECB National Club Twenty20 with the local tournament known as the Winkworth Cup and the ECB National club cup (A 50 over competition)

In 2003 Bracebridge Heath joined the league from the Nottinghamshire Cricket Board Premier League and became the most successful club in the league, winning the league title 13 times.

The league adopted a new format in 2019, with the top four teams at the end of the league season qualifying for semi-finals and a final to decide the championship, in the first season Woodhall Spa won the playoff after Bracebridge Heath was unable to field a side for the final.

The competing teams in 2020 were intended to be: Boston, Bourne, Bracebridge Heath, Grantham, Lindum, Louth, Market Deeping, Scunthorpe Town, Sleaford, and Woodhall Spa. The 2020 competition was cancelled because of the COVID-19 pandemic. A replacement competition was organised for the later part of the season when cricket again became possible, but with the winners not to be regarded as official league champions.

In 2023 the Lincolnshire ECB started formal discussions for the 3 leagues to merge into one county wide structure and after 2 years of discussions a vote took place between clubs of all 3 teams on 16 October 2025. The vote was passed and the 3 leagues were dissolved to create the Lincolnshire Premier Cricket League. The first season of the new league took place in 2026.

== Champions ==
- League Champions 2000–2014
  Year	Club
  2000	Bourne
  2001	Bourne
  2002	Bourne
  2003	Bracebridge Heath
  2004	Bracebridge Heath
  2005	Bracebridge Heath
  2006	Bracebridge Heath
  2007	Bracebridge Heath
  2008	Bracebridge Heath
  2009	Bracebridge Heath
  2010	Bourne
  2011	Bracebridge Heath
  2012	Haxey
  2013	Sleaford
  2014	Bourne
- League Champions 2015–2025
  Year	Club
  2015	Bracebridge Heath
  2016	Bracebridge Heath
  2017	Bracebridge Heath
  2018	Bracebridge Heath
  2019	Woodhall Spa (Note: Woodhall Spa won the playoff after Bracebridge Heath was unable to field a side for the final.)
  2021	Bourne
  2022	Bourne
  2023	Lindum
  2024	Scunthorpe Town
  2025	Bracebridge Heath
- Winkworth Cup Winners 2001-2014
  Year	Club
  2001	Bracebridge Heath
  2002	Sleaford
  2003	Cleethorpes
  2004	Grimsby Town
  2005	Lindum
  2006	Bracebridge Heath
  2007	Bracebridge Heath
  2008	Grimsby Town
  2009	Messingham
  2010	Bracebridge Heath
  2011	Bracebridge Heath
  2012	Bracebridge Heath
  2013	Bourne
  2014	Woodhall Spa
- Winkworth Cup Winners 2015–2025
  Year	Club
  2015	Bourne
  2016	Sleaford
  2017	Bourne
  2018	Bracebridge Heath
  2019	Bourne
  2021	Bracebridge Heath
  2022	Sleaford
  2023	Bourne
  2024	Woodhall Spa
  2025	Lindum

== Premier Division Performance by season from 2000-2025 ==
Key
Gold	Champions
Blue	Left League
Red	Relegated

Performance by season, from 2000-2025
Club	2000	2001	2002	2003	2004	2005	2006	2007	2008	2009	2010	2011	2012	2013	2014	2015	2016	2017	2018	2019	2021	2022	2023	2024	2025
Alford and District																		10	11						
Billingborough															12										
Boston			8	11	10	10	10	12			10	3	12				9	7	5	10	8				
Bourne	1	1	2	2	4	5	4	7	3	10	1	2	7	8	1	4	6	3	6	3	1	1	4	6	8
Bracebridge Heath				1	1	1	1	1	1	1	4	1	2	4	3	1	1	1	1	2	3	8	9	7	1
Burghley Park																									5
Caistor	8	6	10			9	9	11	11	11															
Grantham	10	3	1	12	11											9	2	2	2	5	2	4	3	3	4
Grimsby Town	3	7	9	6	6	3	3	2	8	6	8	6	8	7	10	10	11	11	12				6	9	9
Hartsholme											12	10	9	12											
Haxey									12				1	11											
Lindum	7	9	6	5	7	4	2	3	7	5	3	8	5	3	2	7	5	6	8	6	6	5	1	2	2
Long Sutton	9	10		10	9	11																		12	
Louth								6	6	3	9	5	10	9	8	5	7	9	10	9	9	10			
Market Deeping	6	2	5	3	2	6	8	8	4	8	7	7	11	5	7	6	4	8	7	7	7	6	5	8	11
Market Rasen	5	5	3	8	12										11	11									
Messingham	4	4	7	4	5	8	7	10	9	12															
Nettleham							6	9	5	9	6	12					12					9	11	10	12
Owmby (Note: Owmby resigned from the Premier League after the 2005 season.)				7	8	7																			
Scunthorpe Town																			9	8	5	3	10	1	2
Skegness (Note: Skegness resigned from the Premier League after the 2016 season.)										2	5	11	3	6	6	8	10					12			
Sleaford	2	8	4	9	3	2	5	4	10	4	2	4	4	1	4	2	3	5	3	4	4	2	2	5	7
Spalding														10	9	12		12				11	8	11	10
Woodhall Spa								5	2	7	11	9	6	2	5	3	8	4	4	1	10	7	7	4	6
References																									
