= Birkenhead Park Cricket Club =

Cricket club in Birkenhead Park, Merseyside, England

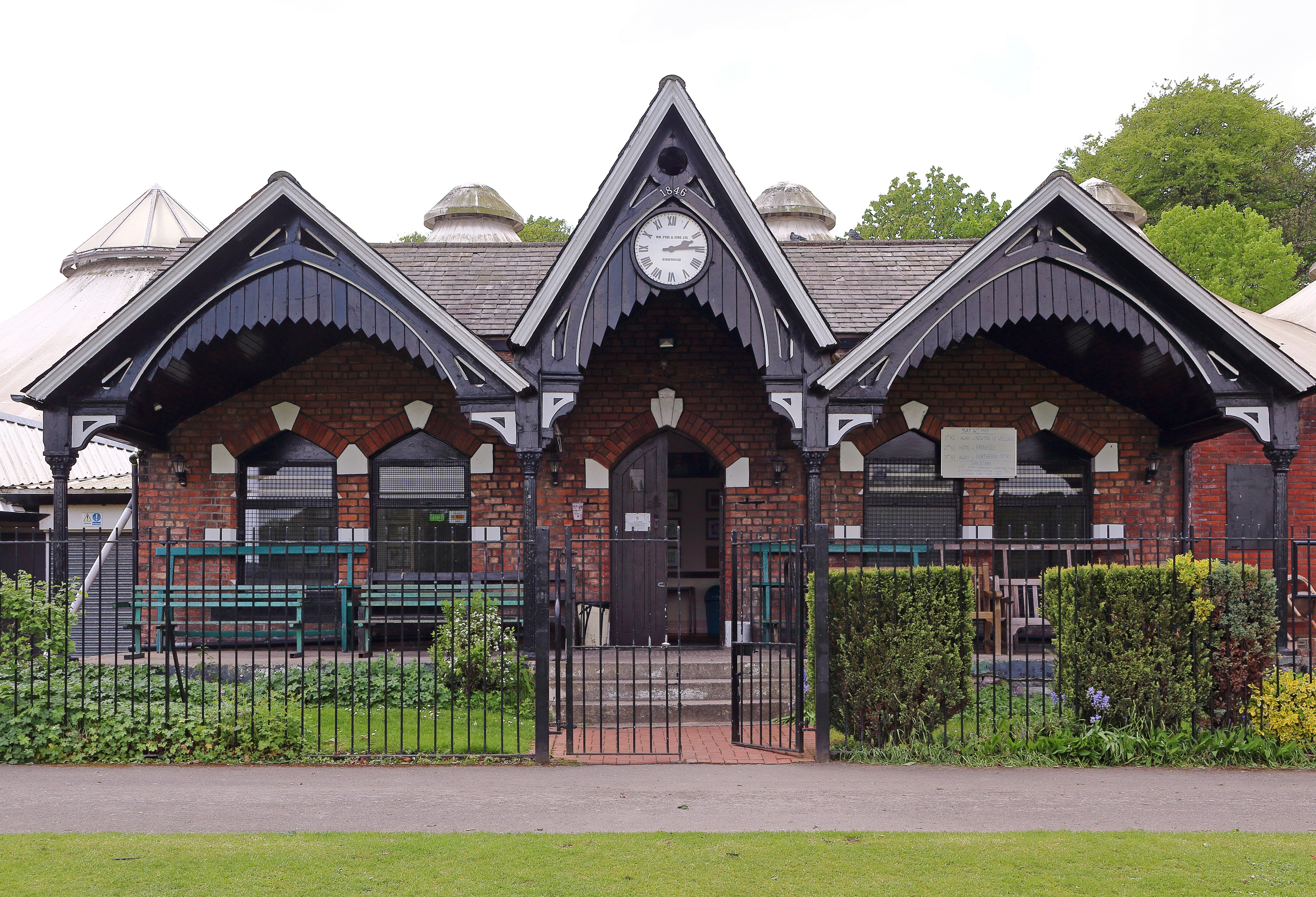
- Birkenhead Park Cricket Club pavilion
- League: Liverpool and District Cricket Competition

Personnel
- 1st XI captain: (England) Alex Harris

Team information
- Colours
- Founded: 1846
- Home ground: Birkenhead Park
- Official website: Birkenhead Park CC

Birkenhead Park Cricket Club is a cricket club based in Birkenhead Park in the Wirral on Merseyside, England. The club was founded in 1846 and has one of the oldest cricket pavilions in the country.

They are currently members of the Liverpool and District Cricket Competition. The club runs four senior Saturday teams as well as junior sides at U11, U13, U16 and U21 age groups.

Their 1st and 2nd XI play on the front pitch while the 3rd and 4th XI compete on the back pitch which is commonly known as Cannon Hill.

== History ==
The majority of historical information included on this page is adapted from the 1996 book Birkenhead Park Cricket Club 1846-1996 by Chris Elston. The post-96 era is written by former club scorer and archivist Craig Kell.

=== Formation ===
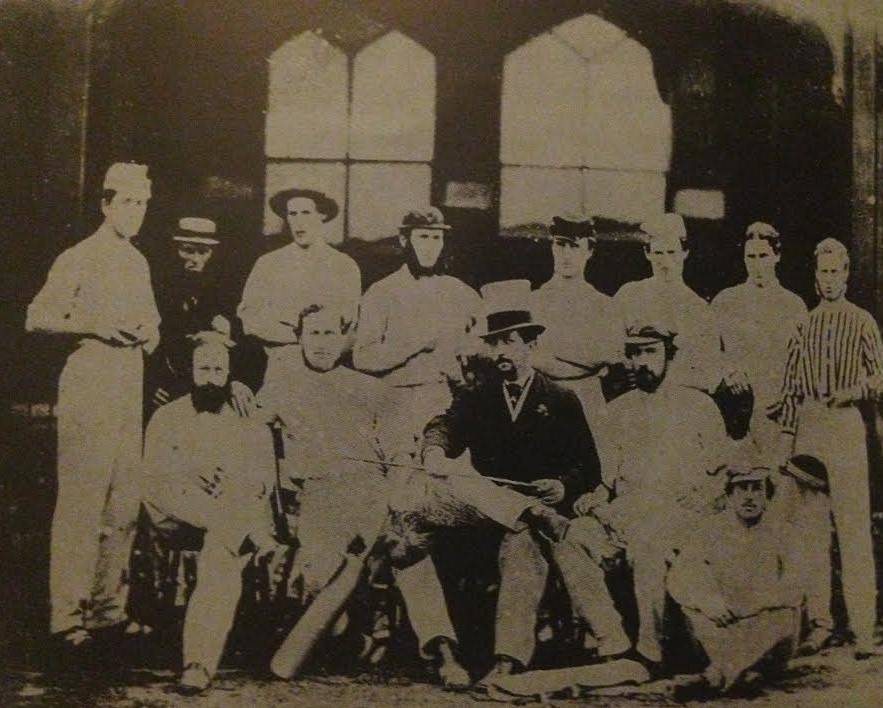
Birkenhead Park's present clubhouse built 1849

In 1846, Birkenhead Park Cricket Club was formed on Park Drive, based in the park itself. At the time, it was a very exclusive club in which all the members were Old Boys of the top public schools. Because there were so few clubs in the area, the members arranged matches between themselves, such as married vs. singles. From the start, the ground was enclosed by railings and initially had a tent used as the pavilion. This was later followed by a wooden structure which was then replaced by the present club house that still stands to this very day.

=== Early years (19th Century) ===
One of Park's first ever fixtures came against Bootle Cricket Club though unfortunately the result is unknown. However this was to mark the beginning of their long rivalry which still continues today. 1847 saw them take on another historic opponent in Liverpool for which both teams celebrated victory in the two games played that season.

The following year saw Park bowled out for 18 by Liverpool which is officially their lowest ever score.

During the first thirty years of their formation, Park played MCC at Lords, Surrey at the Oval and Cambridge and Oxford Universities as well as touring Ireland and Scotland. Perhaps the most significant game of that era was when they played Lancashire in 1864. Staged in Warrington, it was the Red Rose's first ever fixture and ended in a close draw. A return game was later played back in Birkenhead.

During the period, Park also had two amateur players who would tour Australia with England and play one test each. They were Sandford Schultz, born in Birkenhead, and Reginald Wood, born in Woodchurch.

In 1877, George Dunlop scored the club's first double century as he made 201 in a fixture against Rock Ferry. The team's total of 508 is Park's highest and still stands to this day.

1881 saw one of Park's greatest players Cecil Holden make his debut against Southport Cricket Club. Over the next fifty years, he was to dominate the club, first as a player and then as its President. He played first class cricket for Lancashire on several occasions and also represented the Liverpool & District and Cheshire sides. During his prolonged Park career, he ended up compiling almost 20,000 runs and took over 650 wickets.

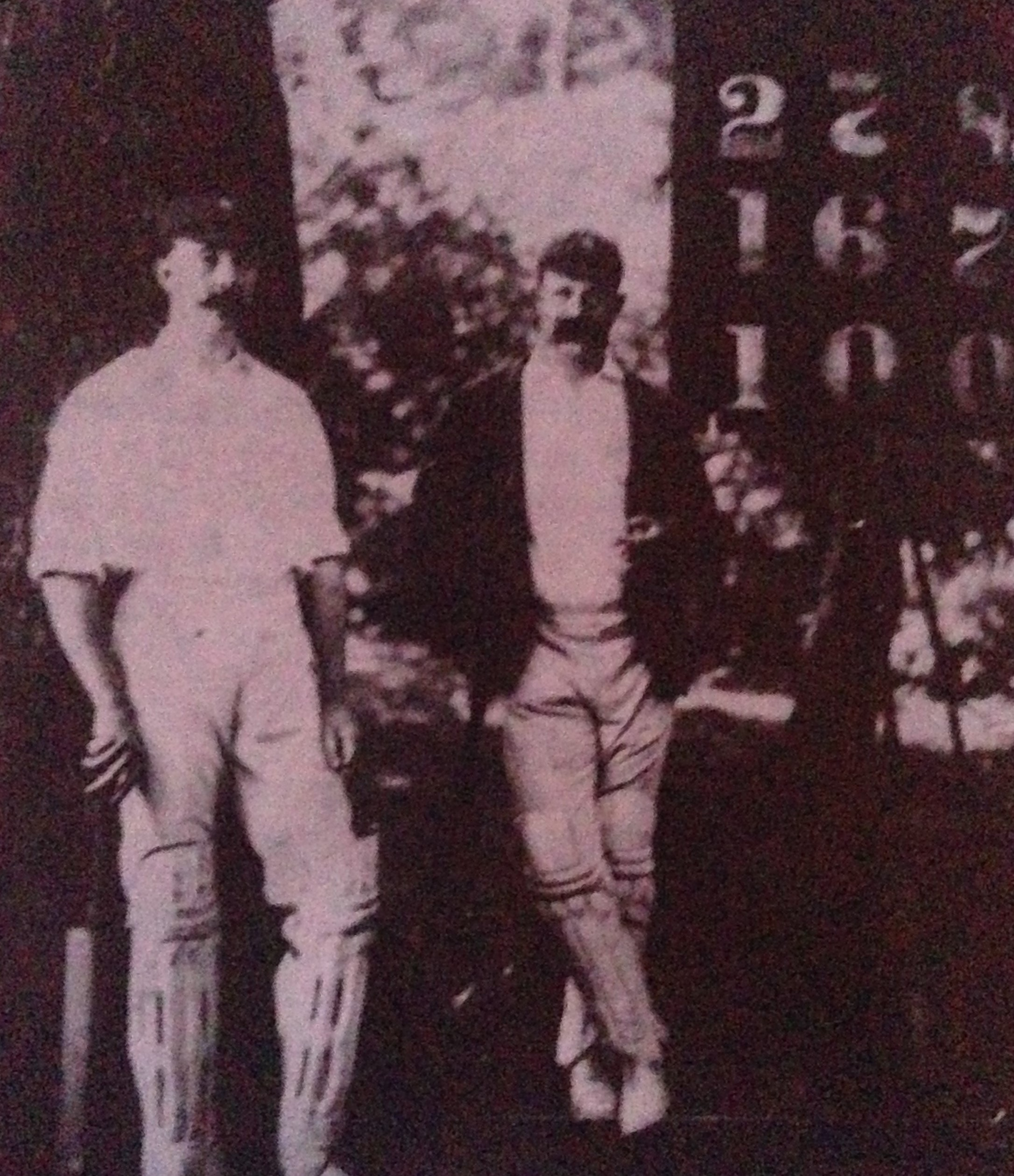
William Barnes (167 n.o) & Cecil Holden (100 n.o) in the club record opening partnership of 278

One of Holden's biggest contributions came in 1898 when he and William Barnes forged a new competition opening partnership record of 278 in a two-day evening game at Oxton.

Holden also struck the club's second double century (202) in a home match against Northern. The hosts had been reduced to 83 for 9 when Holden and number eleven batsman C E Steen put on a club record 178 run partnership for the final wicket as Park eventually finished up on 261 all out.

1892 brought about the formation of the Liverpool and District Cricket Competition after a Liverpool newspaper began publishing a weekly table in order to create more interest in the game.

Park were one of eleven senior clubs to make up the original table with the other teams being Bootle, Formby, Huyton, New Brighton, Northern, Ormskirk, Oxton, Rock Ferry and Sefton.

The century ended with the 3rd XI being formed in 1898.

=== Early 20th Century ===
The 1900s began with the club converting the ladies pavilion into a public stand which was then later replaced by a lounge. At the time, women were not allowed into the clubhouse until the 1950s.

1908 saw Park win the unofficial Liverpool Competition for the first time. A year later, all-rounder K D R Morrice made history for them by taking all eleven wickets in a twelve a-side match versus Western. He would also go on to make over 1000 runs in that season at an average of 61.8.

No cricket was played between 1915 and 1918 owing to World War I. The club had suffered great loss during that period with some members having laid down their lives for their country in active service.

In 1931, Park tied with local rivals Wallasey for the championship which was made possible by the acquisition of fast bowler Jack Bartley who took 67 wickets at an average of 10.37. During two spells with the club between 1931 and 1936, Bartley would take over 400 wickets for which two of those seasons would see him snare over 100 dismissals. He became the second 1st XI bowler to take all the wickets in a match as he claimed 10-37 against New Brighton in 1935.

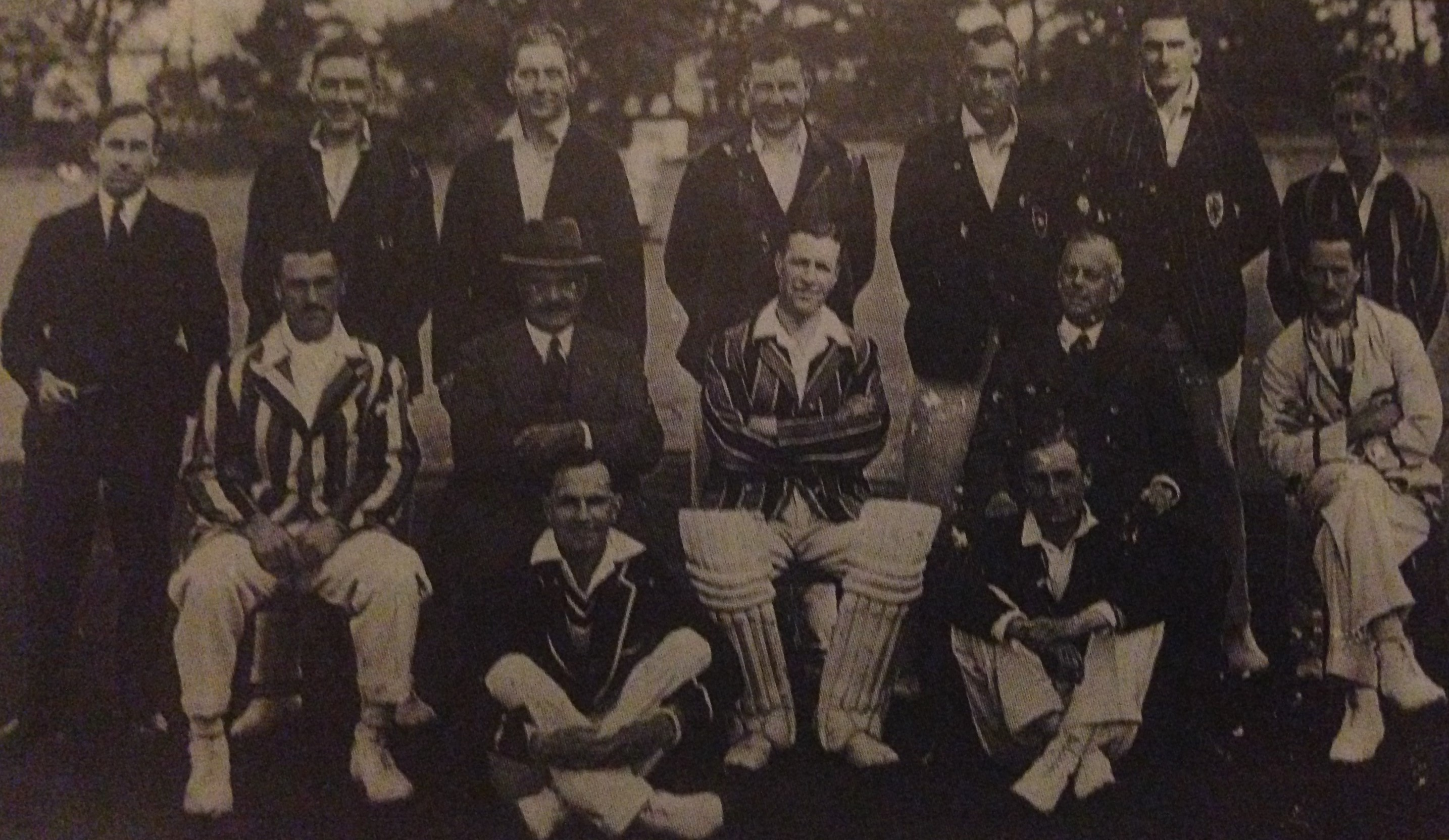
Birkenhead Park 1st XI 1931

It was in that particular year that saw Park celebrate winning the championship again. It was a second title success for captain Arthur Cooke who was to take charge of the 1st XI on three occasions (1929-1932, 1934-1936 and 1938-1939).

Another standout name from that period was batsman John Rogers who amassed 1228 runs (in all competitions) at an average of 55.8 during the 1933 season. This Park record wouldn't be broken until 70 years later.

1936 would see the club play their first friendly fixture against Tranmere Rovers F.C., a tradition that would carry on until the end of the century.

The following year saw Park High School student Noel Overend become a member. His involvement with Park would make a big difference many years later when he would go on to become the club's most successful captain.

The first recorded hat-trick from a Park bowler came from M E White who claimed three dismissals in a row in a home win against Ormskirk in 1938.

1939 saw the cricket season overshadowed by the arrival of World War II, over twenty years since the end of the previous conflict. The pavilion was taken over by the military with various club portraits and scorebooks stored away safely. During the war, the council decided to remove the railings surrounding the ground as part of the war effort but they were never used as they contained the wrong metal content.

=== Post-war period ===
Following the end of World War II, the president confirmed that several club members had been killed in action. They were G A Bone, E S Locke, G A Hosking, JM Kerr and H E Rogers. The pavilion had also been affected after it had sustained damage which was to be later paid off by the war damage commission.

The return of cricket proved frustrating for Park particularly in 1948 when they failed to win a single game all season and ended up finishing bottom of the table.

The following season marked the arrival of Jamaican-born wicket-keeper Clovis Roach who was to be the club's first overseas player. A key member of Noel Overend's dominant title-winning team of the 1960s, Clovis was to be a regular fixture in the 1st XI for many years and would even go on to be awarded an MBE for his work as a probation officer. He also went on to skipper the 2nd XI as well as serve two terms as club president.

In 1950, 56 year old Rex Bloor became captain of the 1st XI again which made him the second man after Arthur Cooke to have skippered the club on three separate occasions. That same year saw bowler Colin Tomkinson make his debut for the club. He would become the first Park player to represent the 1st, 2nd, 3rd and 4th elevens over the course of 45 years.

In 1951, J R Dobie became the second 1st XI player to take a hat trick during a fixture against Hightown.

The following season saw M Finlay lead the 2nd XI to their first ever championship win. That year also proved a significant one for the club as Bill Edgar and the great Tony Shillinglaw made their first team debuts.

Along with David Hope, the three players were part of the title-winning team of 1955. Captain Alf Liggins played a pivotal role by scoring over 800 runs as Park sealed their championship triumph on the final day of the season.

In 1956, Bill Edgar took four wickets in four balls against St Helens Recs, the only Park player to have achieved that remarkable feat.

Away from the cricket, the club began to improve its facilities which included the installation of flush toilets and the construction of their present scorebox. 1958 saw women finally being allowed into the clubhouse for the first time, albeit half an hour after the close of play.

=== The Noel Overend title-winning era ===
1959 saw Noel Overend take over as 1st XI captain which would lead to Park dominating the Liverpool Competition for the next few years. One key factor in that successful period was the acquisition of leg spinner Brian Jameson from Wavertree. A member of the club for seven seasons, Jameson took over 500 competition wickets which would make him one of Park's greatest ever players.

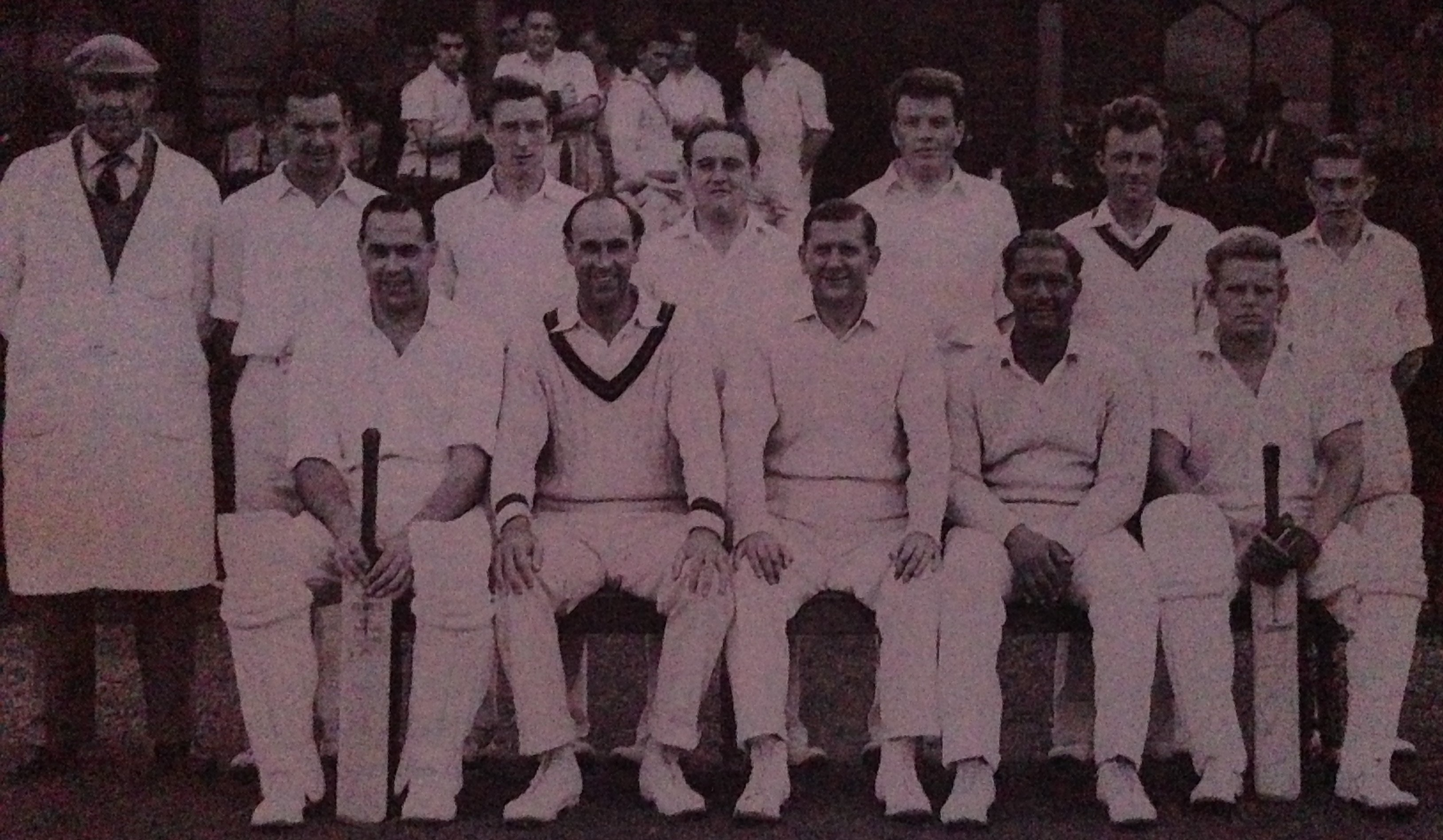
Park's championship winning team of 1960.

1960 marked the club's first of five title wins in six years as Jameson and Shillinglaw dominated the bowling and batting performances. One of their most memorable victories that season came when Shillinglaw smashed a 52-minute century in an away success at Ormskirk.

Jameson was instrumental again with the ball during the 1961 campaign when he took 80 wickets as Park retained the title. However it was wicket-keeper Clovis Roach who took the plaudits by claiming 50 victims behind the stumps, which still remains a post-war Competition record. Elsewhere the 3rd XI triumphed in the Alderman Dawson Knock-Out Cup but they would have to wait forty years before landing their next trophy.

1962 saw the first team clinch a third consecutive championship with 14 victories achieved during that season. Jameson claimed another 63 wickets to his name including a last over hat trick against Chester Boughton Hall. That was then followed by his season-best tally of 83 dismissals as Park made it four title triumphs on the trot in 1963.

The 1964 campaign was to be the most successful of that period as Park clinched the double of the championship and the John Summers Knockout Cup. Remarkably, Jameson was overshadowed by new addition Ray Digman who would take 87 wickets. Following that season, Overend retired as 1st XI captain thus bringing down the curtain on the greatest period in Birkenhead Park's cricketing history.

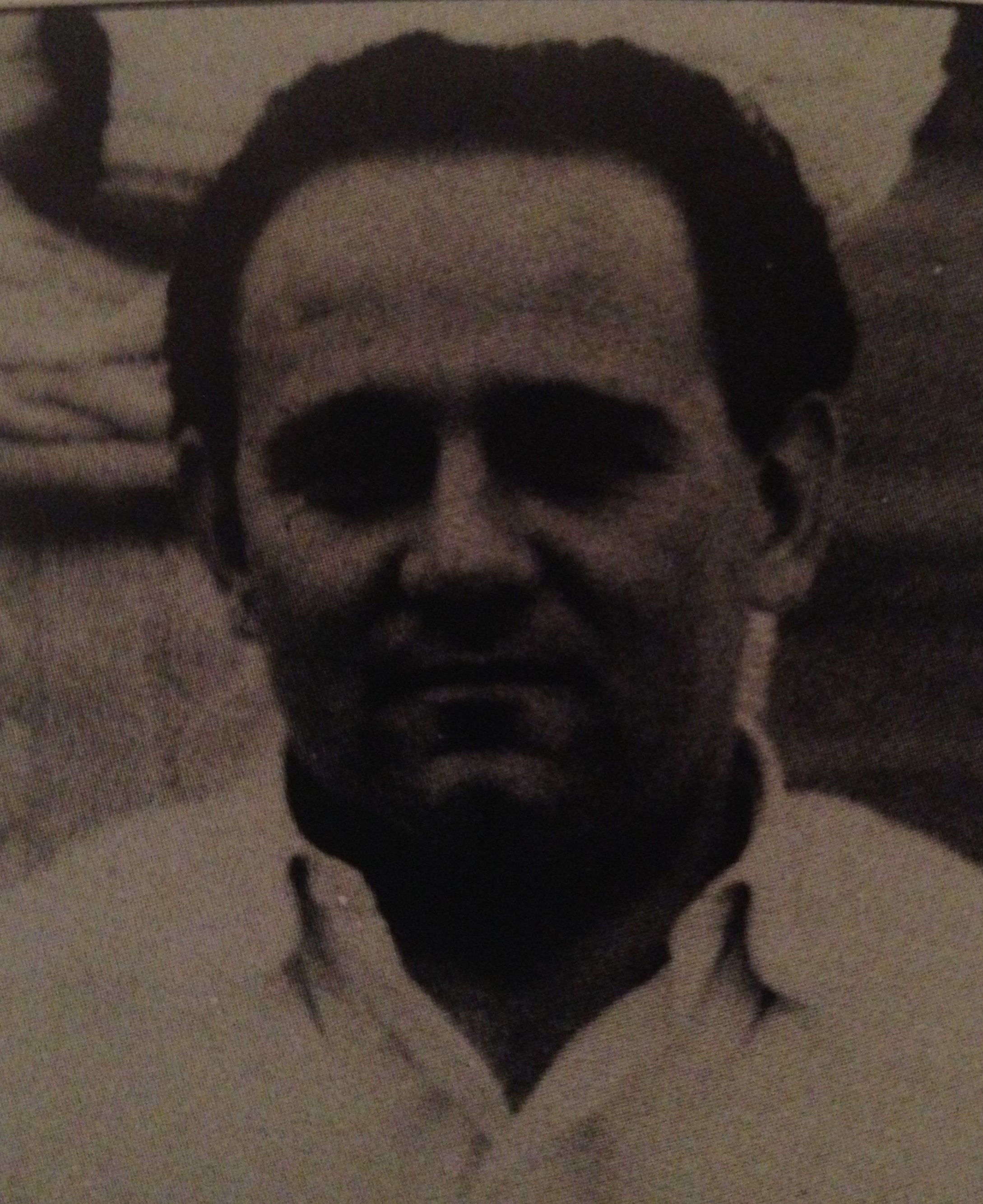
Brian Jameson

1965 saw Tony Shillinglaw become the new skipper but the team's title-winning reign came to an end as they were pipped to the championship by local rivals Neston. The crucial departure of Jameson was another key blow although he could not be faulted after his significant contributions to the club in the previous few years. However one important name to make his 1st XI debut that season was Andy Hurworth who would go on to become one of the most prolific batsmen in the Liverpool Competition's history.

In the same year that England won the World Cup, Park managed to regain the championship with captain Shillinglaw and the Reverend Max Wigley taking over 50 wickets in the season. However the club would have to wait 20 years before becoming league champions again.

In the meantime, there was another cup success for Shillinglaw and his first team in 1967 as they secured the John Summers Knockout Cup for the second time in three years. The following year would see future Cheshire Cup-winning captain Ken Crofton make his 1st XI debut.

=== The silent 70s ===
Following a quiet end to the 1960s, Park had an inconsistent time during the 1970s. This was mostly down to their lack of success in the league although the 2nd XI celebrated two championship wins in 1971 and 1977.

Under Terence Steele, the first team made an excellent showing in the National Knockout Competition for which they reached the quarter-finals during the 1972 season. They achieved this even without Shillinglaw who had opted to play for Sefton Park, the only year he was away from the club.

However he would come back the following season as captain and would produce the best bowling performance of his career in a memorable win at Neston. He became only the third Park bowler to take all the wickets in a game as he finished with extraordinary figures of 10-28.

1974 saw Bill Stott repeat Shillinglaw's remarkable feat as he took all ten wickets for the second team in a game against Ormskirk. That same year also saw bowler John Carpenter take a hat trick for the first team against Wallasey.

In 1975, Park reached their first Cheshire Cup final but lost by four wickets to Brooklands.

Two years later, future 1st XI captain and club president Dave Turner led the Under 21s to victory in the H S Brown Cheshire Cup.

The decade ended with Andy Hurworth leading the first team to their only 20/20 cup success as they defeated Odyssey in the final of the Liverpool Echo Knockout. However they were pipped to the championship title by Southport.

=== Success in the 80s ===
1980 marked a 1st XI debut for young batsman Ian Platt who would go on to become a regular fixture in the Park team over the next thirty years.

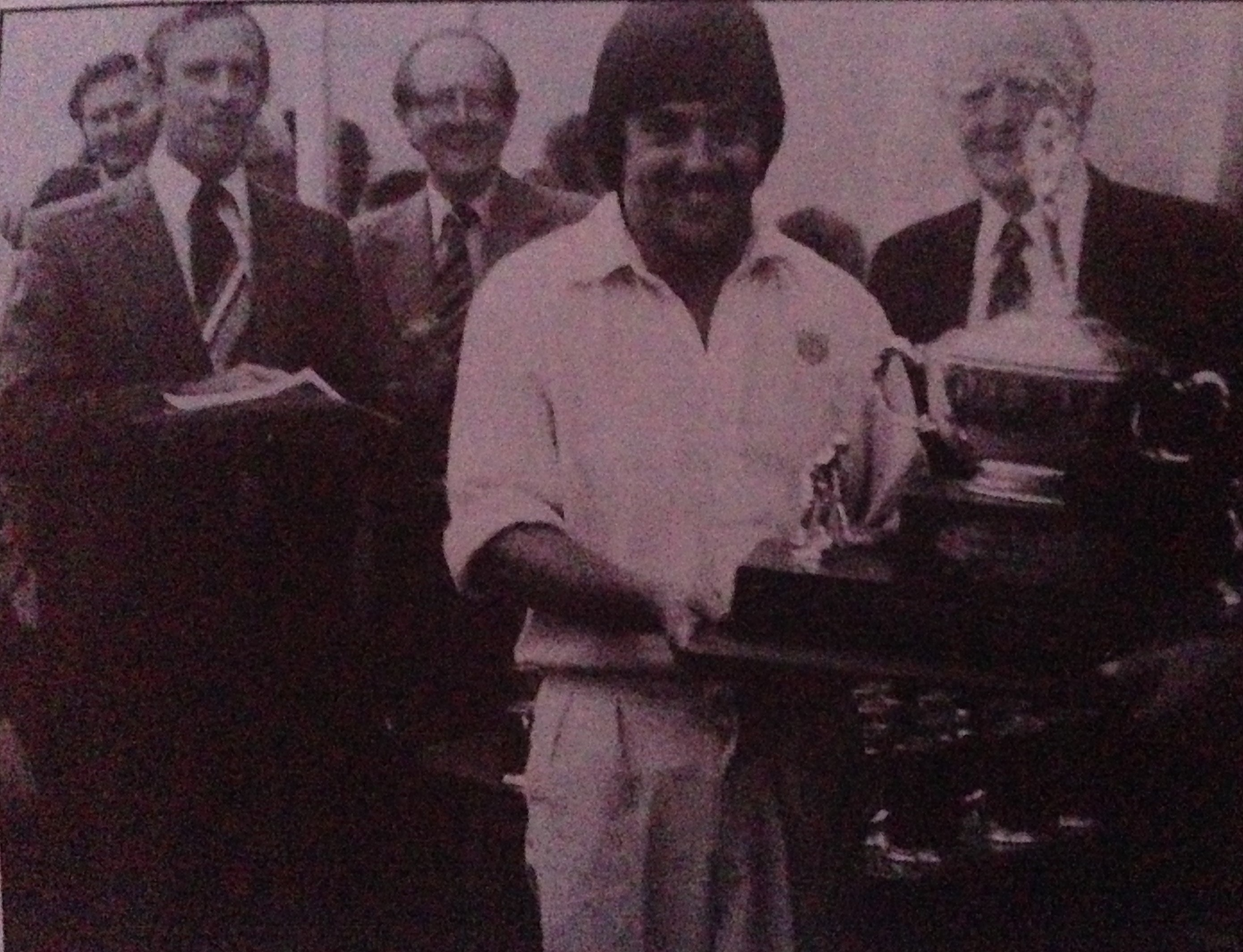
Ken Crofton lifting the Cheshire Cup in 1981

Six seasons after their first Cheshire Cup final appearance, it was second time lucky for Park as Ken Crofton led to them to an eight wicket win over local rivals New Brighton. One of the standout players in that game was left arm spinner Ian McCormick who claimed three dismissals. He and his brother Stuart McCormick were to play a pivotal role for Park during the next two decades.

In 1984, the first team reached their third Cheshire Cup final but lost out to Elworth in what was Hurworth's second spell as skipper. Almost twenty years after leading the 1st XI to title success, Tony Shillinglaw managed to repeat the feat with the second eleven as they sealed their fourth title win.

1986 proved to be one of the most successful seasons in Birkenhead Park's history as their first and second teams won their respective league championships. Under captain Peter Carlton, the 1st XI had clinched the title with a month of the season to play with key performances coming from the likes of Shillinglaw, Andy Hurworth, Graham Steele, Adrian Cairns and the McCormick brothers. Another individual to play a significant role was West Indian all-rounder George Codrington who was Park's first overseas signing in many years. Dave Turner's stern captaincy had been vital in helping the 2nd XI to their league triumph for which they would repeat the feat a year later.

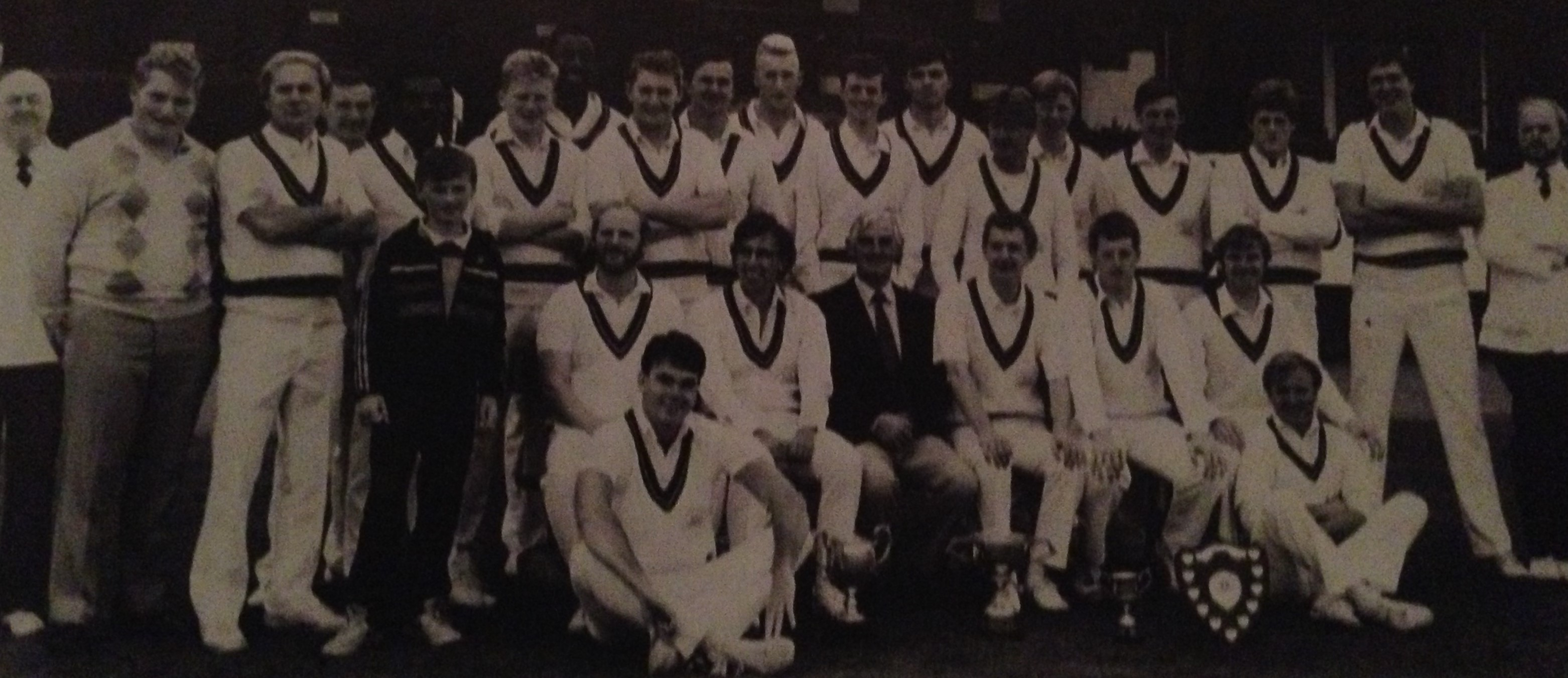
Birkenhead Park 1st & 2nd XIs - both winners of their Liverpool Competition leagues 1986

However the 1st XI were unable to do the double as they suffered their third Cheshire Cup final defeat at the hands of Cheadle. This was then followed by another failure the year after when they lost their last three wickets for two runs in a one-run loss to Stalybridge.

1988 saw Dave Turner promoted from 2nd to 1st XI captain but Park initially struggled to get some momentum going. However some key performances from bowler Andy Cross helped them win eight of their last nine games as Park snatched the championship title by one point. Despairingly though, they slumped to their third consecutive Cheshire Cup final loss when they suffered an eight wicket defeat to local rivals Oxton.

=== End of the 20th Century ===
The 90s began with the club making plans to build an indoor cricket school, as envisioned by Tony Shillinglaw many years earlier. The school, commonly referred to as the nets, was eventually finished in 1993 and was officially opened by the former West Indies and Lancashire captain Clive Lloyd. There was also a new cricket square erected on the section of the Park known as Cannon Hill, based between the clubhouse and neighbours Birkenhead St Marys. This would finally lead to the formation of the fourth team.

In 1991, left-arm spinner and captain Gareth Evans led Park to a one wicket win over Neston in the final of the Kidson Impey Knockout Cup. By then, young players like future skipper Chris Foran and batsman Ian Cooper were starting to break into the team and would make significant contributions over the next two decades.

Two years later, former skipper Dave Turner had the unique fortune of taking hat-tricks in consecutive games against St Helens Recs in the league and then Rainford in the Liverpool Echo Knockout.

Another remarkable performance from that decade came from Alistair Cairns, son of former 1st XI player Adrian. His incredible spell of 8 overs, 7 maidens, 1 run, 1 wicket helped the second team clinch the Second Eleven Knockout Cup with victory over Bootle.

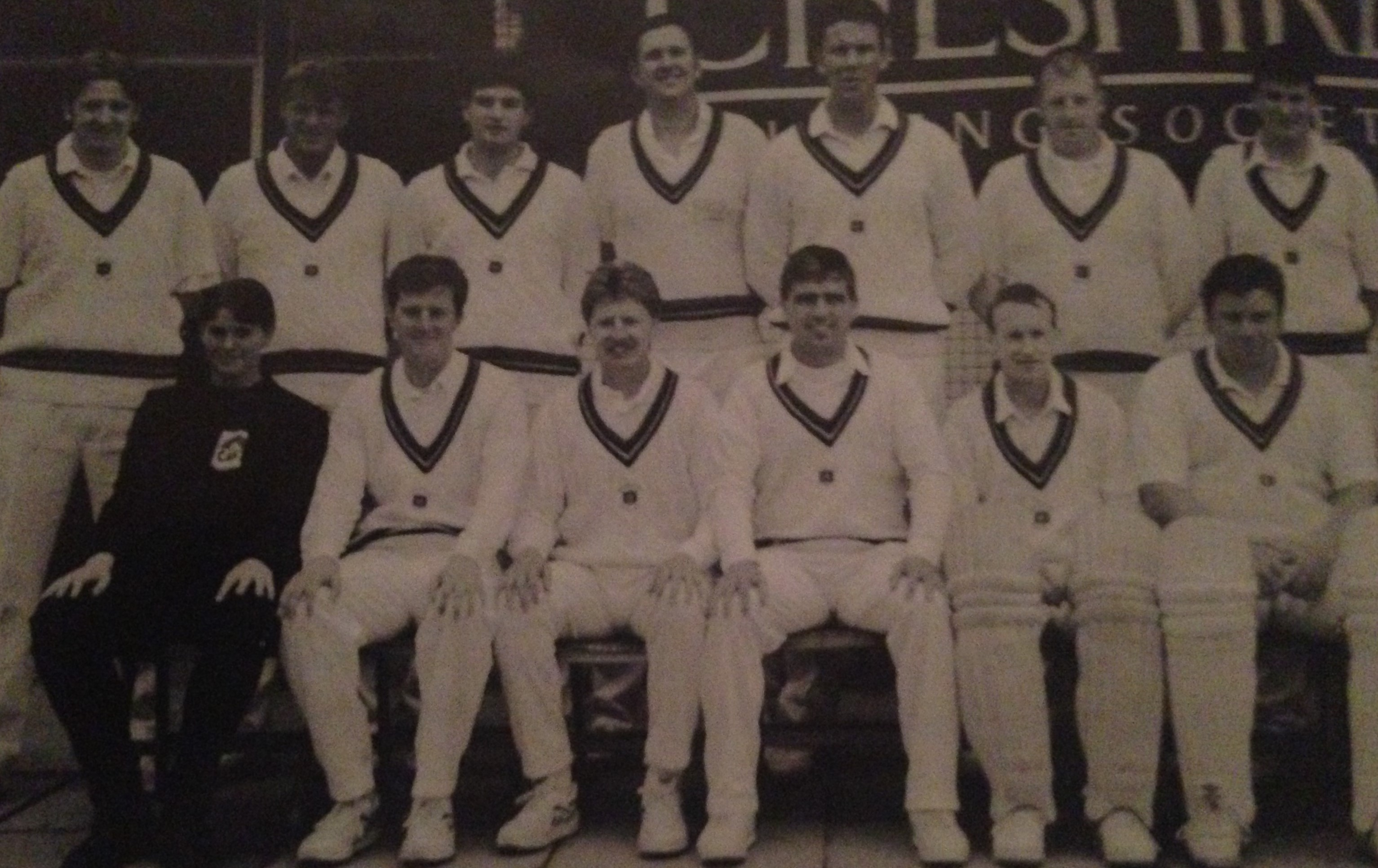
Park 1st XI, winners of the Cheshire Cup in their 150th year, 1996

1996 marked the 150th anniversary of Birkenhead Park Cricket Club's existence as the 1st XI pulled off their second Cheshire Cup triumph by beating the holders Poynton by two runs in a thrilling final. Having restricted Park to an underwhelming 112 for 8, Poynton ended up collapsing from 52-0 to 110 all out with the final wicket coming via a run out from Dave Williams. However, Gareth Evans' team were unable to make it a cup double as they lost a close game to Chorley in the Regional Final of the National Knockout Cup.

That same year also saw history being made as the Under 11 side clinched the Wirral Junior League with future 1st XI skipper Chris Stenhouse amongst the players involved. Another historic occasion saw three women, Gill Steele, Lindsay Tierney and Carol Nuttall, play for the 4th XI during that season. This led to the formation of the women's team which lasted for a few years before dissolving after 2000.

1997 proved to be an important year for Park albeit for different reasons. Having finished 22nd out of 25 in the now-expanded league, the club made the bold decision to resign from the Liverpool Competition after competing in it for over 100 years. They were to join fellow clubs Oxton, Neston and Chester Boughton Hall in the newly reformed Cheshire County Cricket League for the following season.

=== Settling down in Cheshire ===
The transition from the Liverpool Comp to Cheshire would provide plenty of ups and downs for the Park over the next fourteen seasons.

1998 saw them finish mid-table under Martin Smith with the standout match coming against Alderley Edge when Chris Foran and Edge skipper Stuart Bolton both took hat-tricks in the same game.

With the Millennium just around the corner, there was a change of captaincy for the 1999 campaign as 24 year-old Foran took charge of the first team thus becoming the youngest captain in the club's history. It proved to be a master-stroke as he led them to Premier League promotion with key contributions coming from Australian batsman Anthony Smith (800 runs) and former skipper Gareth Evans (67 wickets).

But preparations for the club's first season in the top flight were complicated when Foran found work in London which resulted in Evans becoming captain for a third spell. Unfortunately, Park had one of their worst ever campaigns as they were relegated by early August and only managed one win which came in the penultimate weekend against Neston. Their points tally of 122 remains a record for teams finishing bottom of the Cheshire County Premier League.

Evans carried on as skipper and helped the club secure a top half finish in 2001 before handing over the reins to wicket-keeper David Smith for the 2002 season. By then, Park were continuing to develop promising young players which included batsman Tommy Hunter, all-rounder Chris Stenhouse and bowlers Carl Ainsworth and John Costain.

However, the club suffered their second relegation in three years as they had the misfortune of finishing with the worst points tally in Division One. Smith kept his role for 2003 as the club brought in a new overseas professional in the form of New South Welshman left-hander Damon Livermore. The Australian made a crucial difference with the bat as he scored an incredible 1,352 runs (including four centuries) which remains the highest tally by a batsman in Cheshire County Division Two. Along with the excellent bowling of John Costain, Park secured promotion back to the First Division though they narrowly missed out on winning the league. The 2nd XI went one better by landing the title under the captaincy of Jason Rioux.

Livermore contributed again the following year with over 800 runs as Park endured a topsy-turvy season which saw them go from relegation contenders in August to finishing an ambitious fourth place in Division One. However, 2004 ended with David Smith relinquishing the captaincy after three years at the helm while Livermore returned to Australia and Gareth Evans retired.

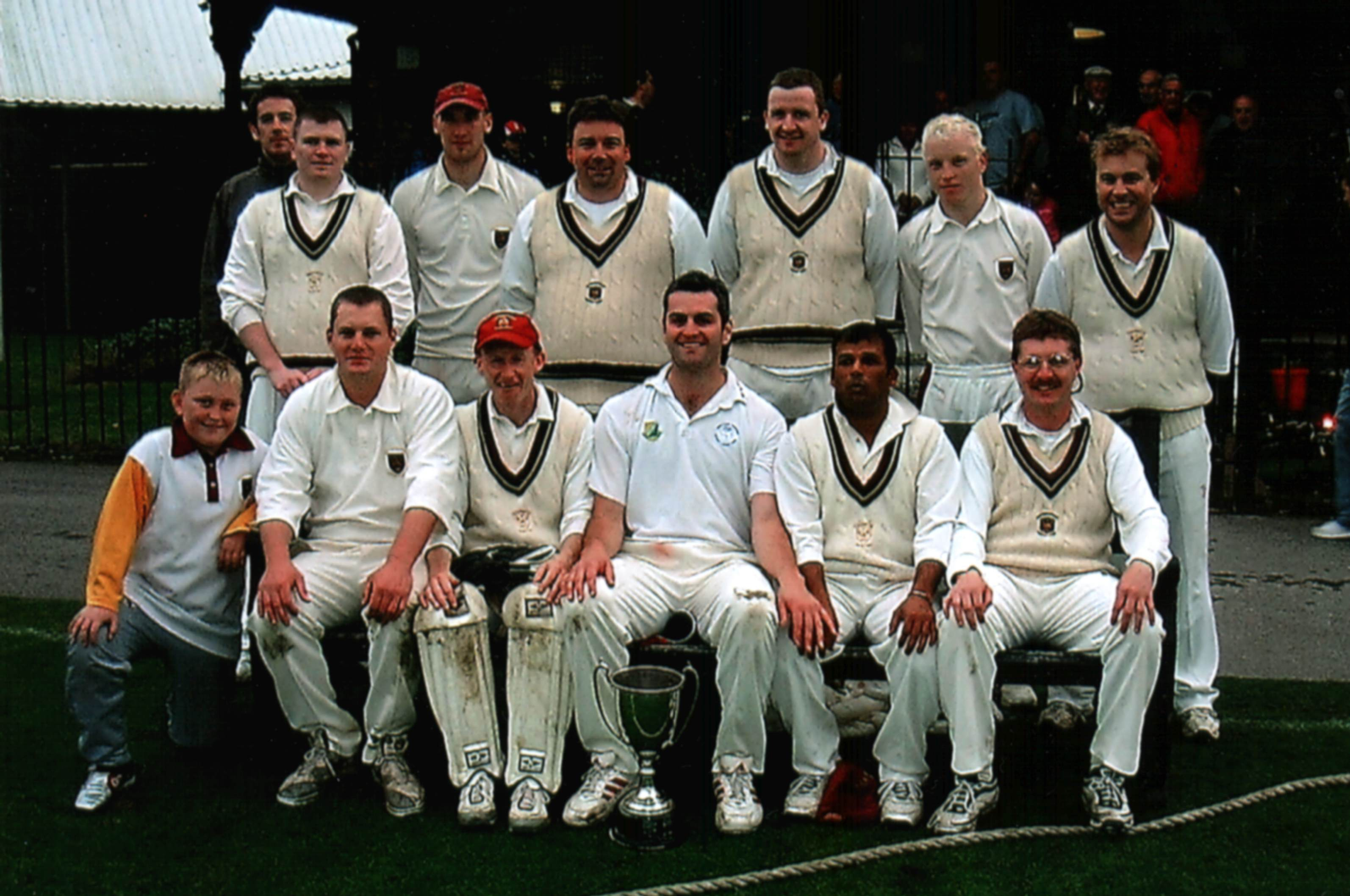
2005 Division One Champions

For the 2005 season, the club were able to appoint Chris Foran as captain again as he brought in a new overseas player in the form of Pakistani leg-spinner Shahid Mahmood. The 1st XI initially struggled early on and found themselves mid-table in June but ended up going unbeaten for the remainder of the season. Promotion and the title was confirmed on the final day when they beat local rivals Upton in front of their home supporters, less than a week after England had defeated Australia in the Ashes. Mahmood finished up with 70 league wickets which included 9-28 against Upton in the reverse fixture though there were vital combinations from various players including Martin Smith, Stephen Potter, Ian Platt, Chris Stenhouse, Carl Ainsworth and new batsman Andrew Gibson.

=== The Cheshire County decline ===
The success of 2005 would prove to be the last major high point for Park in Cheshire as they found themselves struggling over the next few years. Long distance travelling and overs cricket was starting to have an effect on them.

Hoping to avoid a repeat of their disastrous top flight campaign in 2000, Park started 2006 well with two wins in three but they soon capitulated when they suffered nine defeats in ten games to fall into the relegation zone. One of those losses came in an extraordinary game at Hyde which saw Park chalk up a mammoth 321-4. Shahid Mahmood was to score the quickest century in Cheshire County League history as he brought up his ton off just 29 balls. However all that hard work was extinguished as Hyde chased the total down to win by two wickets in the final over. Once again, Park could only last one season in the highest tier as they were relegated on the final day of the season. Foran stepped down as captain with Andrew Gibson stepping into the breach though the club suffered the blow of losing key players like Mahmood and Chris Stenhouse.

Gibson's bid to freshen the team up with younger players failed to improve things as Park endured another woeful campaign in which they managed only one win in eighteen prior to the final month of the First Division season. With back-to-back relegation looking imminent, they finally turned things around in remarkable fashion as they won their remaining four games to pull off the Great Escape. Tommy Hunter and departing bowler John Costain both performed crucially in those matches with the latter taking five wickets in his final appearance.

2008 proved to be a bizarre one as Park yet again found themselves in another basement battle and only managed two wins all season. While they struggled for form in the league, they ended up dominating the Cheshire Shield competition as they crushed Marple in the final by 125 runs. However just three weeks later, they suffered their second relegation in three years after losing a low scoring game at fellow strugglers Cheadle.

With Gibson departing, Tommy Hunter took over the captaincy but life in Division Two was no better as Park had yet another difficult campaign. They were strengthened by the return of all-rounder Chris Stenhouse but once again, survival was only secured on the final day of the season when they beat Mobberley to stay up. That same year also saw Mark Evans take charge of the 2nd XI for which he would go on to become their most successful captain.

Chris Foran then became only the fourth man to captain Park on three occasions as he took charge again for the 2010 season. An early highlight came in a home draw against Mobberley in which Ian Cooper and Australian batsman Adam Watson both scored centuries in the same innings, a record previously made almost 100 years earlier. However, it ended up being another tough year as Park managed just four wins which seemed to be enough to keep them up with a month to go. Unfortunately, they lost their final five games which resulted in them losing their place in the Cheshire County Cricket League after thirteen seasons.

Now playing in the Meller Braggins Cricket League, Park had lost the services of Foran and bowler Carl Ainsworth but had a new skipper in Chris Stenhouse. The rebuilding process continued to be affected by some disappointing results early in the 2011 season as they slumped towards the bottom two in June. However, crucial news came that month when the club decided to apply for a return to the Liverpool and District Cricket Competition. The move was granted which helped the 1st XI turn their fortunes around as Stenhouse produced some incredible bowling performances to ensure Park ended their time in Cheshire with a top 6 finish. Mark Evans also landed his first trophy as 2nd XI skipper as his team won the Meller Braggins 2nd XI Division.

=== Coming home to the Comp (2012-present) ===
Park's return to the Comp was welcomed by many other clubs as all four teams prepared for a fresh start in 2012.

Things could not have gone any better for them when the first, second and third teams all won their respective leagues in what proved to be one of the most successful seasons in the club's history. The 1st XI held on to top spot in Division Two from June onwards with Stenhouse instrumental with the ball again as he took 70 wickets, a feat which saw him later named the Liverpool Comp Bowler of the Year. However it was his batting that clinched the title as his unbeaten half century helped Park beat Burscough on the final day of the season. The 2nd XI also strolled to their second consecutive title victory while the 3rd XI finally ended their 50-year hunt for trophy success as they won their league under former first team captain Ken Crofton. The Under 20s also performed well making it to the final of the Liverpool Comp Under 20 Knockout Cup only to lose a close game to Rainhill.

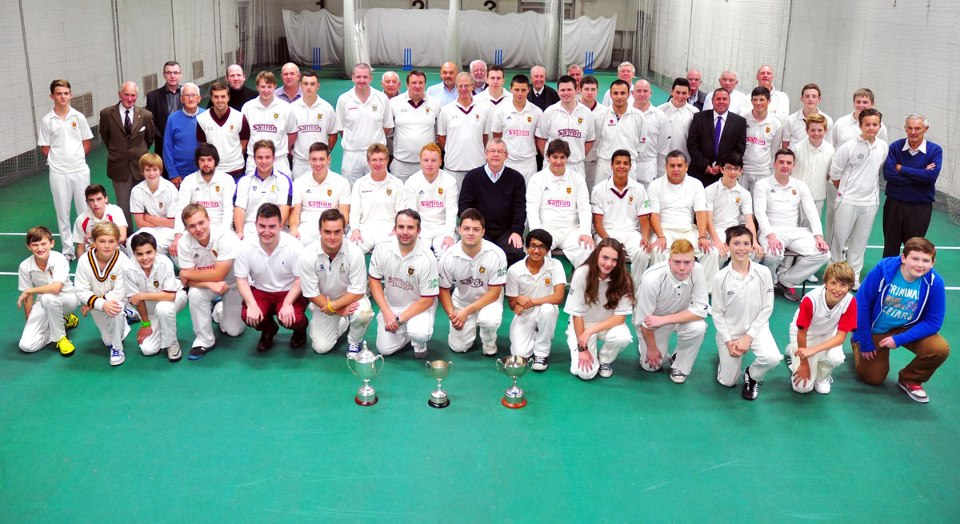
Birkenhead Park C.C members celebrating triple cup success in 2012.

With the Premier League in their sight, Park's ambitions were made clear in 2013 when they welcomed back former players Chris Foran, Mike Barnes and Adrian Kinsey. However the key signing of experienced spinner Robbie Houghton was to prove crucial in what turned out to be another lucrative year for the club.

The first team went from strength to strength as they produced some excellent results to help them stay top of the First Division. While the likes of Barnes, Kinsey and Adam Liu contributed useful runs, Stenhouse and Houghton forged a dynamic bowling partnership as the pair shared 139 wickets over the course of the league season. Park also performed well in the Cheshire Cup as they reached the semi-finals for the first time since 1996 only to suffer a heavy ten wicket defeat against old adversaries Chester Boughton Hall.

Back-to-back promotion was then clinched with two games to go as Stenhouse claimed eight dismissals against Liverpool to lead his team to the Premier League. The championship was then secured on the final day when Houghton struck a stunning century to help his team to victory at Wigan. The 2nd XI made it a hat-trick of title wins under Mark Evans though the 3rd XI narrowly missed out on winning their division.

Park's first season in the Liverpool Comp Premier League saw them finish in a satisfactory seventh place. However they would find themselves being overshadowed by the remarkable effort made by the second team as they landed a fourth championship success on the bounce by clinching the 2nd XI Premier Division. They were unable to make it a double as they lost the Chester Cup final to local rivals Wallasey. History was made by the 4th XI as they landed their first trophy success by winning the First Division title.

Despite their respective mid-table position, the first team lost the services of Stenhouse whose four-year reign as captain ended with him moving to Bootle. Batsman Chris Davies took charge for the 2015 season and managed to bring in quality players like Luke Camden and the Sri Lankan all-rounder Ian Daniel. The latter showed his class with both bat and ball as he scored over 900 runs in all competitions and took 50 wickets. Park were involved in some thrilling games that year which included a memorable away win at National T20 champions Chester Boughton Hall in the Liverpool Echo Knockout Competition. They also pulled off their highest ever run chase victory as they chased down Lytham's total of 258 to seal a sensational win. Records continued to tumble in the final game of the season as the departing Rob Houghton pulled off the remarkable feat of taking his 1000th Liverpool Comp wicket in a defeat by Highfield. Despite that loss, Park finished up in a commendable sixth place.

Unfortunately the loss of key players like Houghton and Daniel left Park in dire straits throughout 2016 as they suffered one of their worst seasons to finish bottom and be relegated from the Premier League. They will look to bounce back quickly in 2017 when they compete in the First Division.

== Honours and achievements ==
=== 1st XI ===
- Cheshire County League Div. 1 Champions: 1999, 2005
- Cheshire Cup Winners: 1981, 1996
- Cheshire Shield Winners: 2008
- John Summers KO Cup: 1961, 1964, 1967
- L&DCC Champions: 1955, 1960, 1961, 1962, 1963, 1964, 1966, 1986, 1988
- L&DCC Div.1 Champions: 2013
- L&DCC Div.2 Champions: 2012
- L&DCC KO (Ray Digman Trophy) Winners: 1981, 1991
- Liverpool Echo KO Trophy Winners: 1979, 2024

=== 2nd XI ===
- Cheshire County League Div.2 Champions: 2003
- Cheshire Cricket League Champions: 2011
- L&DCC Champions: 1952, 1971, 1977 (joint), 1984, 1986, 1987, 2014
- L&DCC Div.1 Champions: 2013
- L&DCC Div.2 Champions: 2012
- L&DCC KO (Chester Cup) Winners: 1995

=== 3rd XI ===
- Alderman Dawson KO Cup: 1961
- Jack Gardner Trophy Finalists: 2004
- L&DCC Div.1 Champions: 2012

=== 4th XI ===
- L&DCC Div.1 Champions: 2014

=== Development XI ===
- Cheshire U21 Cup Winners: 1977
- L&DCC U20 Finalists: 2012

== Club Captains ==
Years	Captain	Years	Captain	Years	Captain
1846 – 1859	Not known	1946 – 1947	RJ Hughes	1988 – 1990	Dave Turner
1860 – 1878	William Lockhart	1948 – 1949	BJ Rogers	1991 – 1992	Gareth Evans
1879 – 1892	FH Pickworth	1950	Rex Bloor	1993 – 1994	Graham Smith
1893 – 1912	Cecil Holden	1951	JRT Dobie	1994 – 1995	Dave Turner
1912	KDR Morrice	1952 – 1955	Alf Liggins	1996	Gareth Evans
1913 – 1919	John Rogers	1956 – 1957	William Edgar	1997 – 1998	Martyn Smith
1920 – 1921	CW Marshall	1958	John Cook	1999	Chris Foran
1922 – 1923	HE Smith	1959 – 1964	Noel Overend	2000 – 2001	Gareth Evans
1924	A Brettargh	1965 – 1968	Tony Shillinglaw	2002 – 2004	David Smith
1925 – 1926	Harold Hodgson	1969 – 1971	David Hope	2005 – 2006	Chris Foran
1927 – 1928	Rex Bloor	1972	Terence Steele	2007 – 2008	Andrew Gibson
1929 – 1932	Arthur Cooke	1973 – 1975	Tony Shillinglaw	2009	Tommy Hunter
1933	Joseph Hodgson	1976 – 1979	Andrew Hurworth	2010	Chris Foran
1934 – 1936	Arthur Cooke	1980 – 1982	Ken Crofton	2011 – 2014	Chris Stenhouse
1937	Rex Bloor	1983 – 1985	Andrew Hurworth	2015 – 2016	Chris Davies
1938 – 1939	Arthur Cooke	1986 – 1987	Peter Carlton	2017	Mike Barnes

== Player of the Year winners ==
Years	Winner	Years	Winner	Years	Winner
1977	Adrian Cairns	1990	Ian McCormick	2003	John Costain
1978	Andrew Hurworth	1991	Andrew Hurworth	2004	Carl Ainsworth Shaun Carlton
1979	John Carpenter	1992	Tony Shillinglaw	2005	Chris Foran
1980	Ian McCormick	1993	Gareth Evans	2006	David Smith
1981	Dave Turner	1994	Martyn Smith	2007	Tommy Hunter
1982	Frank McRae	1995	Stuart McCormick	2008	Tommy Hunter
1983	Peter Carlton	1996	Dave Turner	2009	Chris Stenhouse
1984	Graham Smith	1997	Joe Wilson	2010	Carl Ainsworth
1985	Ian Platt	1998	Chris Finegan	2011	Chris Stenhouse
1986	Peter Carlton	1999	Gareth Evans	2012	Chris Stenhouse
1987	Andrew Hurworth	2000	Gareth Evans	2013	Adrian Kinsey
1988	Andy Cross	2001	Ian Platt	2014	Mark Evans
1989	Stuart McCormick	2002	Tim Johnson	2015	Robbie Houghton

== Club records ==
1000 runs in a season

- John Rogers - 1121 runs in 1933 season
- Damon Livermore - 1352 runs in 2003 season

Highest individual scores

- Cecil Holden - 202 vs Northern - 1898
- George Dunlop - 201 vs Rock Ferry - 1877
- Reginald Wood - 190 vs Oxton - 1884
- KDR Morrice - 187* vs Rock Ferry - 1910
- Cecil Holden - 175* vs Wigan - 1889
- JA Black - 170* vs Rock Ferry - 1889
- J Ravenscroft - 170 vs Rock Ferry - 1899
- William Barnes - 167* vs Oxton - 1898
- FH Pickworth - 162 vs Childwall Rovers - 1884
- Alf Liggins - 156* vs Formby - 1956
- John Rogers - 151 vs New Brighton - 1933
- Cecil Holden - 146 vs Manchester - 1893
- Colin Barker - 145 vs Oxton - 1950
- Frank Parrington - 144 Western - 1912
- Damon Livermore - 143* vs Cheadle - 2003
- Cecil Holden - 140 vs Huyton - 1889
- Charles Timmis - 140 vs Chester Boughton Hall - 1929
- R Stubbs - 137 vs Oxton - 1883
- Harold Hodgson - 137* vs Neston - 1919
- Colin Baker - 136 vs Ormskirk - 1950
- FW Hunt - 133 vs Neston - 1913
- Harold Hodgson - 133 vs Formby - 1919
- RM Chadwick - 132 vs Huyton - 1912
- Frank Parrington - 131 vs Rock Ferry - 1911
- FA Jones - 130* vs Neston - 1909
- RM Chadwick - 130 vs Chester Boughton Hall - 1911
- John Rogers - 129 vs Neston - 1932
- Cecil Holden - 128 vs Chester Boughton Hall - 1902
- Damon Livermore - 128* vs Bredbury St Marks - 2003
- RM Chadwick - 127 vs Sefton Park - 1909
- John Rogers - 126* vs Liverpool - 1933
- John Cook - 126* vs Hightown - 1953
- Darren McConnon - 126 vs Alvanley - 2001
- FJ Kirby - 124* vs Huyton - 1901
- Harold Hodgson - 124* vs Hightown - 1927
- KDR Morrice - 123* vs Neston - 1908
- KDR Morrice - 122 vs Rock Ferry - 1909
- KDR Morrice - 122 vs New Brighton - 1902
- Robbie Houghton - 121 vs Wigan - 2013
- KDR Morrice - 120 vs Chester Boughton Hall - 1912
- Ian Daniel - 120 vs Wallasey - 2015

Best bowling figures

- KDR Morrice - 11-17 vs Western - 1909
- Tony Shillinglaw - 10-28 vs Neston - 1974
- Jack Bartley - 10-37 vs New Brighton - 1935
- A Berry - 9-17 vs Huyton - 1909
- John King - 9-33 vs Leyland - 1897
- Jack Bartley - 9-37 vs Neston - 1935
- John Carpenter - 9-40 vs Bootle - 1977
- Jack Bartley - 9-42 vs Oxton - 1935
- KDR Morrice - 9-43 vs Western - 1904
- Ray Digman - 9-48 vs Oxton - 1964
- Robbie Houghton - 9-49 vs Southport & Birkdale - 2015
- Jack Bartley - 9-52 vs Oxton - 1936
- R Field - 9-56 vs Huyton - 1953
- Jack Bartley - 9-57 vs New Brighton - 1936
- Jack Bartley - 9-74 vs Hightown - 1935
- Chris Stenhouse - 8-7 vs Trafford Metrovics - 2011
- Cecil Holden - 8-8 vs Leinster - 1889
- KDR Morrice - 8-12 vs Chester Boughton Hall - 1905
- A Cole - 8-14 vs Formby - 1925
- Brian Jameson - 8-15 vs Oxton - 1961
- A Cole - 8-16 vs Huyton - 1925
- CA Robinson - 8-16 vs Chester Boughton Hall - 1956
- Jack Bartley - 8-17 vs Chester Boughton Hall - 1936
- Robert Overend - 8-17 vs Hightown - 1971
- Edwin Smith - 8-18 vs Northern - 1892
- John King - 8-20 vs Ormskirk - 1898
- A Cole - 8-20 vs Ormskirk - 1925
