= Jenson Joseph =

Antiguan cricketer (born 1966)

Personal information
- Full name: Jenson Eugene Simon Joseph
- Born: 7 October 1966 (age 60); Antigua
- Batting: Right-handed
- Bowling: Right-arm fast-medium

Domestic team information
- Years: Team
- 1995–1997: Leeward Islands
- Source: CricketArchive, 25 January 2016

Jenson Eugene Simon Joseph (born 7 October 1966) is a former Antiguan cricketer who played for the Leeward Islands in West Indian domestic cricket. He was a right-arm fast-medium bowler.

In 1987, Joseph played in England for Chester Boughton Hall Cricket Club in the Liverpool and District Cricket Competition scoring 462 runs (avge 25.66) and taking 55 wickets (avge 15.76) in 24 matches.

Joseph made his first-class debut in January 1995, playing against Trinidad and Tobago in the 1994–95 Red Stripe Cup. He took 5/59 on debut, and finished 28 wickets from five matches for the season, making him the equal leading wicket-taker in the competition (with Warrington Phillip of the Windward Islands). At the end of the 1994–95 season, Joseph was selected to play for West Indies A, featuring in two limited-overs games against India. He took only a single wicket, that of Vinod Kambli. Joseph never recaptured the form of his debut season, and played his last game for the Leewards in January 1997.
