= Frederic Jones (cricketer) =

English cricketer

Personal information
- Full name: Frederic John Jones
- Born: 2 November 1850; West Derby, Lancashire, England
- Died: 9 June 1921 (aged 70); Liverpool, Lancashire, England
- Batting: Unknown
- Bowling: Right-arm fast
- Relatives: Charles Jones (brother)

Career statistics
Competition	First-class
Matches	1
Runs scored	13
Batting average	6.50
100s/50s	–/–
Top score	12
Balls bowled	200
Wickets	4
Bowling average	17.75
5 wickets in innings	–
10 wickets in match	–
Best bowling	4/71
Catches/stumpings	–/–
- Source: Cricinfo, 6 October 2015

Frederic John Jones (2 November 1850 – 9 June 1921) was an English cricketer who made one appearance in first-class cricket in 1889.

Jones' batting style is not known, however it is known he was a right-arm fast bowler who played for several top cricket clubs in the Liverpool area in the 1870s and 1880s, including Sefton Park, Sefton, and Huyton. He was selected to play what would be his only first-class cricket match in 1889 when picked for the Liverpool and District cricket team against Yorkshire at Aigburth. In a match which Yorkshire won by an innings and 41 runs, Jones scored 13 runs in Liverpool and District first-innings, before being dismissed stumped by David Hunter off the bowling of Bobby Peel. In Yorkshire's first-innings he took 4 wickets from his 40 overs, conceding 71 runs. His wickets included the England Test cricketer Lord Hawke. In the Liverpool and District second-innings he was last man out, dismissed stumped by Hunter off the bowling of Saul Wade for 3.

Jones' younger brother, Charles, played in his only first-class match as an opening batsman. He died at Liverpool on 9 June 1921.
