= Birkenhead Park (disambiguation) =

Birkenhead Park is a public park in Birkenhead, The Wirral, United Kingdom.

Birkenhead Park may also refer to:

- Birkenhead Park railway station, a railway station in Birkenhead, United Kingdom
- Birkenhead Park Cricket Club, a cricket club in the UK park
- Birkenhead Park FC, a rugby club in Birkenhead, United Kingdom
- Birkenhead Park School, a high school near the UK park

== See also ==
- Birkenhead Lake Provincial Park, a provincial park in British Columbia, Canada
