= James Marshall (cricketer) =

New Zealand cricketer

Personal information
- Full name: James Andrew Hamilton Marshall
- Born: 15 February 1979 (age 47); Warkworth, Auckland, New Zealand
- Batting: Right-handed
- Bowling: Right-arm medium
- Role: Batsman
- Relatives: Hamish Marshall (twin brother)

International information
- National side: New Zealand (2005–2008)
- Test debut (cap 230): 26 March 2005 v Australia
- Last Test: 23 May 2008 v England
- ODI debut (cap 140): 26 February 2005 v Australia
- Last ODI: 1 July 2008 v Ireland
- T20I debut (cap 14): 21 October 2005 v South Africa
- Last T20I: 13 June 2008 v England

Domestic team information
- Years: Team
- 1997/98–2012/13: Northern Districts
- 2002–2003: Buckinghamshire

Career statistics
Competition	Test	ODI	FC	LA
Matches	7	10	148	158
Runs scored	218	250	7,422	4,902
Batting average	19.81	25.00	31.85	35.52
100s/50s	0/1	1/1	13/36	7/33
Top score	52	161	235	161
Balls bowled	–	–	843	487
Wickets	–	–	6	6
Bowling average	–	–	81.16	73.50
5 wickets in innings	–	–	0	0
10 wickets in match	–	–	0	0
Best bowling	–	–	1/2	1/20
Catches/stumpings	5/–	0/–	125/–	57/–
- Source: Cricinfo, 23 March 2017

James Andrew Hamilton Marshall (born 15 February 1979) is a former New Zealand cricketer. He is the identical twin brother of Hamish Marshall.

== Domestic career ==
Marshall can play as both opener and middle-order batsman. He opened the batting for his province Northern Districts until 2004–05, and it is at the top of the order that he has had his major successes at first-class level since he made his debut in 1997–98.

Marshall also played for Northland in the Hawke Cup.

Marshall spent a number of his early domestic winters playing club cricket in England in the Liverpool and District Cricket Competition, initially with Formby cricket club on Merseyside, then moving to neighbours Northern in 2004 and helping them to their Premier League championship success the following year 2005.

In 2013, he ended his cricket career as leading run-scorer for Northern Knights at the one-day level, having scored 3,755 domestic runs as well as first batsman to score 6,000 runs for them. With 126 Plunket Shield matches, he holds a record for most first-class appearances by a domestic player for a single province in New Zealand.

== International career ==
But it was as a middle order player that he made his One Day International debut for New Zealand against Australia in February 2005. Just weeks later he was called into the team for the third Test against Australia – but this time as an opener. His twin brother Hamish played both matches.

When James made his Test debut, he had a batting average of 28.70, but he was picked on potential rather than his track record, the same as Hamish. Technique was also a major factor in the New Zealand selectors' decision to ask James to open once again.

Marshall made his Test debut against Australia on 26 March 2005. He and his brother Hamish became the second pair of twins (after Mark and Steve Waugh) to play Test cricket.

On 1 July 2008, he scored his maiden ODI century, eventually getting dismissed for 161 against Ireland. He shared in a 266 opening stand with Brendon McCullum, which is the highest ODI partnership for any wicket in Black Caps history and the second highest opening partnership in all ODIs. He managed to score his maiden ODI hundred only in his last ODI match. Thus, setting the record for the highest ever ODI score made by any player in his last ODI appearance, also the only batsman to have a score of 150 in his last ODI match(161){only considering the retired players}.
