= Sefton Park Cricket Club =

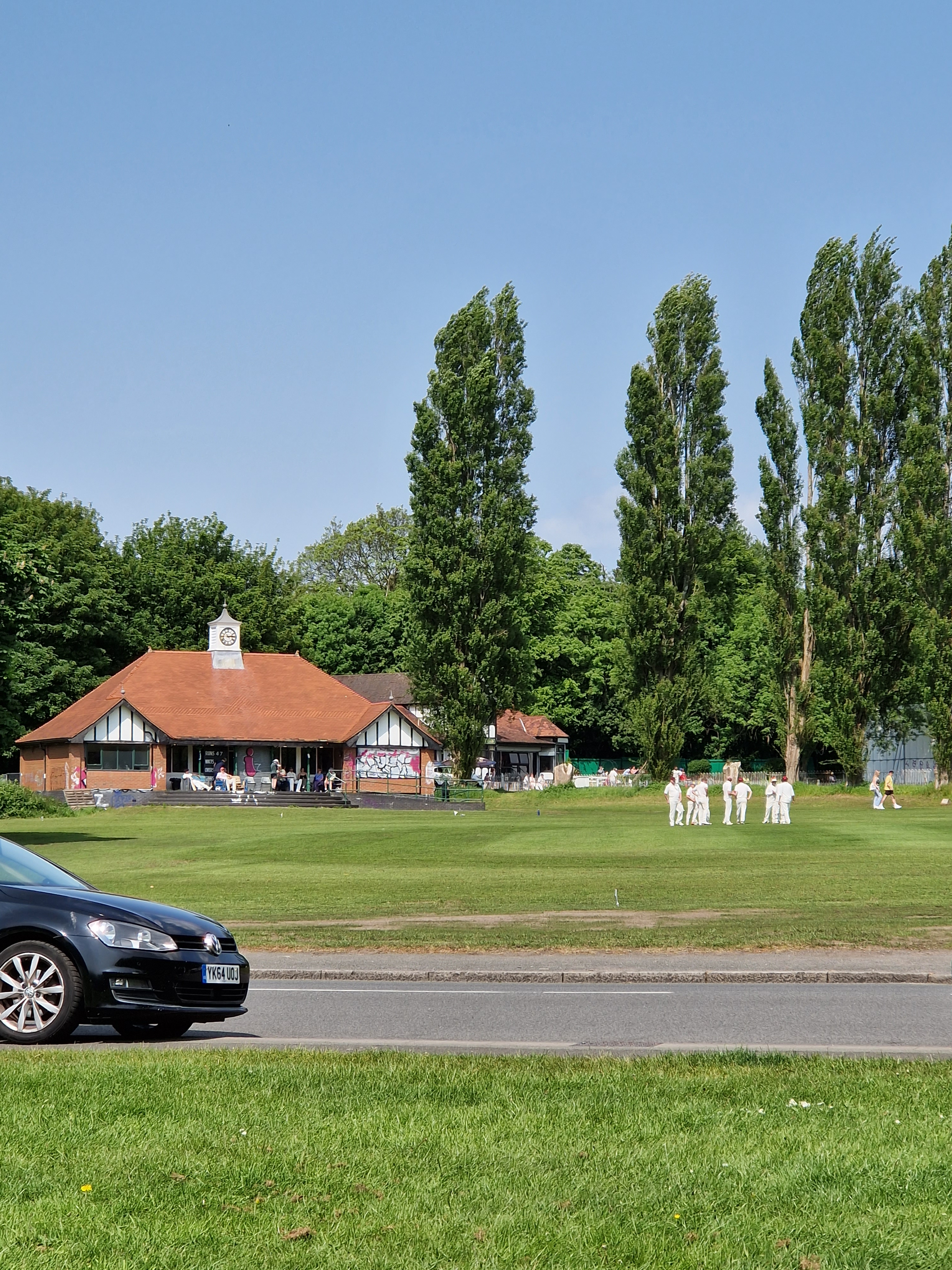
- Sefton Park Cricket Club
- League: Liverpool and District Cricket Competition

Personnel
- Captain: Paul Horton.

Team information
- Colours: Maroon, green and gold
- Founded: 1860
- Home ground: Croxteth Drive
- Official website: Sefton Park CC

Sefton Park Cricket Club in south Liverpool, England was formed as Sefton Cricket Club in 1860. As well as being used for Sefton's senior, women's and junior teams' home fixtures, the club hosts Lancashire age group and junior sides, Liverpool City junior representative games, University of Liverpool cricket and Last Man Stands.

== History ==
The club's original ground was on Smithdown Road bounded on one side by what is now Langdale Road. With pressure on the land for development, the club moved to its present ground in the north-eastern corner of Sefton Park shortly after the park's opening in 1876. Sefton became Sefton Park Cricket Club in 1998 and in 2003 the club's second ground with its own pavilion was opened adjacent to the main ground by the city's Lord Mayor.

The club is a founder member of the Liverpool and District Cricket Competition, which became an ECB Premier League in 2000, and currently plays in the Competition's First Division. Since league fixtures were standardised in 1949, Sefton have been L&DCC champions in 1967 and 1972 and have since won the First Division (2000) and Second Division (2013) titles as well as winning the Liverpool Echo Knockout in 1978 and reaching the Lancashire Knockout final in 1999. The club fields six sides in the Competition, five on a Saturday and one on a Sunday plus an occasional Midweek XI. The junior section fields seven sides from Under 9s upwards.

== Honours and achievements ==
- Liverpool and District Cricket Competition Champions: 1906, 1932, 1967, 1972; Runners Up: 1912, 1955, 1964, 1978, 1996.
- First Division Champions: 2000; Runners Up: 2003, 2019
- Second Division Champions: 2013
- National Knockout Best Performance: Sixth Round (Last 16): 2001
- Lancashire Knockout Finalists: 1999
- L&DCC Ray Digman Knockout Finalists: 1982, 1996
- L&DCC Ray Tyler Knockout Finalists: 2018
- Liverpool Echo Knockout Winners: 1978; Finalists: 1976, 2000, 2010

2nd XI

- 2nd XI L&DCC Champions: 1955, 1975, 1977 (joint), 1983, 1988, 1999
- First Division Champions: 2004
- Chester Cup Finalists: 2007, 2010, 2012, 2018
- Chrysalis T20 Cup Winners: 2018; Finalists: 2016

3rd XI

- Saturday 3rd XI L&DCC Premier Division Champions: 2013; Runners Up: 2004, 2008
- Embee Trophy Winners: 1995, 1997, 2002, 2004, 2013; Finalists: 2007, 2012

4th XI

- Saturday 3rd XI L&DCC First Division Champions: 2016; Runners Up: 2001, 2004, 2009

Sunday XI

- Sunday 3rd XI L&DCC First Division Runners Up: 2004
- Sunday 3rd XI L&DCC First Division (South West) Champions: 2014

== Notable players ==
- Edward Roper was first mentioned for taking a team of Seftonites to Redcar in 1863 at the age of 13. Two years later it is recorded that he played for Sefton at Smithdown Road in a game against Birkenhead Victoria. Roper captained Sefton from 1880 to 1893 and played for both Lancashire and Yorkshire between 1876 and 1880 and continued to play until 1893 when he received a testimonial of £500 subscribed to by 212 members of the club. After his death in 1921 a memorial tablet was presented to the club and unveiled on 22 April 1923. The names of the clubs who subscribed to the tablet are inscribed around its edge.
- William Findlay kept wicket for the club for a short time at the beginning of the 20th century before playing for Lancashire and Oxford University. He later became well known as an administrator and was secretary of Surrey CCC until 1920 and then of the MCC during the 1932-3 Bodyline Tour.
- Ray Digman, one of the finest fast-medium bowlers the Liverpool Competition has produced, joined Sefton as his first club and made his 1st XI debut in 1950. He returned to the club in 1970 and was a key member of the club's 1972 title-winning side. He represented Cheshire in the Minor Counties Championship from 1955 to 1972. A long-standing secretary and later vice-president of the L&DCC, the Competition's 1st XI Knockout Trophy is now named in his honour.
- Noel Cooke joined Sefton as a schoolboy and made his 1st XI debut in 1952 whilst still at school and topped the Competition bowling averages in 1953 and 1955 despite missing games due to national service in 1954 and 1955. In 1956 he became the first player to score 500 runs (532 at 34.31) and 50 wickets (52 at 10.92) in the same season, including taking four wickets in four balls in the last over against Bootle, and was invited to play for Lancashire 2nd XI, scoring 74 not out against Northumberland. Cooke played 12 first-class games in 1958 and 1959, scoring 242 runs with a highest score of 33, held two catches and took three wickets with a best analysis of 2–10, the only Sefton player to play for Lancashire between 1912 and 2004.
- Sydney-born Paul Horton joined the club for his second season in English club cricket after moving from Winstanley Park to play a higher standard of cricket and made his 1st XI debut in 2001. He was quickly picked up by the Lancashire youth set-up, captaining their Under 17 and Under 19 teams before becoming Sefton club captain for the 2002 and 2003 seasons. He passed 1000 league runs for Sefton in 2003 and in 2005 broke the L&DCC league record for the first wicket with Ben Moore when they put on 240 against Leigh. Horton, who continued to play for Sefton when availability allowed, became vice-captain at the county in 2014 but left at the end of the 2015 season to join Leicestershire.
- Chris Whelan came through the schoolboy ranks at Sefton, making his first team debut in 2001, before taking a hat-trick at Lytham aged 16 in 2002. Chris was signed by Middlesex, making his second team debut in 2003, List A debut in 2004 and County Championship debut in 2005, a year in which he was named Liverpool Echo Young Sports Personality of the Year and was also his last playing for Sefton. His best bowling figures for Sefton were 5–40 against Leigh in 2004. Whelan left Middlesex for Worcestershire in 2008 where he played until 2011.

=== Prominent overseas players ===
- Queensland all-rounder Ashley Noffke played for Sefton in seasons 1996 and 2000, scoring 1460 runs at an average of 42.94 and taking 103 wickets at 14.91 in 49 Liverpool Competition League and Cup games before playing one ODI and two T20s for Australia in the 2007-08 Australian season.
- Trinidad and Tobago and future West Indies fast bowler Marlon Black played for Sefton in 1999 taking 46 wickets at 15.89 and scoring 282 runs.
- Mumbai and Indian international spinner Ramesh Powar arrived as a late replacement for Vin Mane in July 2005. He scored 325 league runs at 32.5 in ten games and took 25 wickets at 21.
- Zimbabwe wicketkeeper and future captain Brendan Taylor joined for the 2006 season. He scored 452 runs at 45.2 from 12 league games.

=== Lord Gavron Scholarship ===
Since 2010, Sefton has received young players from Barbados on the Lord Gavron Scholarship, an agreement between the Lancashire Cricket Board and Barbados Cricket Association.

- 2010: Spartan CC, Barbados and West Indies Under 19 wicketkeeper-batsmen Rashidi Boucher was the first recipient of the scholarship to play for Sefton. He scored 514 runs at 42.83 from his 14 league games with a high score of 114 not out plus 41 from 22 balls in the Liverpool Echo T20 Knockout semi-final win against Irby. Boucher returned to Barbados before the end of the season and missed the final defeat against Ormskirk.
- 2011: Empire left-arm spinner Jomel Warrican had played alongside Boucher for the West Indies at the 2010 ICC Under-19 Cricket World Cup and enabled Sefton to recover from a poor start to the season to finish seventh with 45 league wickets at a cost of 17.6 and three 50s. Warrican made his West Indies Test debut in Sri Lanka in October 2015, taking four wickets in the first innings.
- 2012: YMPC, West Indies A and Barbados first-class wicketkeeper Shane Dowrich became the third member of the 2010 West Indies Under 19 World Cup squad to join Sefton; he scored two centuries in draws against local rivals Liverpool as he totalled 733 league runs at an average of 52.35 despite returning to the Caribbean midseason to play for West Indies A. Dowrich made his Test debut for West Indies against Australia in June 2015.
- 2013: Barbados Youth and West Indies Under 19s all-rounder Justin Greaves had a successful season with Sefton scoring 109 and taking 4–32 on debut against Old Xaverians and finishing with 742 runs at 67.45 and 31 wickets at 15.00 in 18 league games as Sefton convincingly won the second division. Greaves made his first-class debut for Combined Campuses and Colleges in April 2014 and his Barbados List A and first-class debuts in early 2016.
- 2014: Jerome Jones
- 2015: Jonathan Drakes
- 2016: Jameel Stuart
- 2017: Shakeem Clarke
- 2018: Jermain Davis

== Captains ==
Years	Captain	Years	Captain	Years	Captain	
1862 - 1863	Charles Fry	1931 – 1932	Rev. John Swift	1989 – 1991	Charlie Blackburn	
1873 – 1874	Bryan Roper	1933 – 1946	Mel Coomer	1992 – 1995	Steve Phillips	
1876	Charles Fry	1947 – 1952	Alan Wilkinson	1996 – 1998	Stuart Wade	
1878 – 1892	Edward Roper	1953 – 1956	Howard Bangs	1999	David Heyes	
1893 – 1902	Charles Jones	1957 – 1959	Wilf Johnstone	2000 – 2002	Stuart Wade	
1903 – 1904	Gerald Williams	1960 – 1961	Dick Hayes	2003 – 2004	Paul Horton	
1905 – 1910	Harvey Blease	1962	Steve Coldwell	2005	Howard Parker	
1911	Frank Edwards	1963 – 1969	Geoff Parker	2006 – 2007	Ben Moore	
1912 – 1914	Harvey Blease	1970 – 1971	Ralph Osborne	2008 – 2010	Rob Houghton	
1915 – 1918	War Period	1972 – 1975	Ted Williams	2011	Paul Squires	
1919 – 1922	Freddie Miller	1976 – 1979	Glyn Parker	2012	Philip Calrow	
1923 – 1928	Ernie Clare	1980 – 1983	Colin Mitchell	2013	Adam Irwin	
1929 – 1930	George Miller	1984 – 1988	John Lonsdale	2014 – 2020	Richard Forsyth	2021 James Dixon

== Club records ==
1000 runs in a season

- D. J. Heyes 1104 runs in 1996
- C. L. Jones 1062 runs in 1888
- P. J. Horton 1021 runs in 2003
- W. H. Bangs 1009 runs in 1954

Highest individual scores

- S. Vandome 180* v Wavertree 2014
- B. Percival 177 v Fleetwood Hesketh 2022
- D. J. Heyes 179* v Ormskirk 1995
- C. L. Jones 170 v Birkenhead Park 1888
- H. Blease 167* v Huyton 1912
- B. W. Moore 167 v Wigan 2007
- C. J. Mitchell 162* v Huyton 1983
- W. H. Bangs 158* v Southport and Birkdale 1952
- R. W. Osborne 158 v Northern 1963
- D. J. Heyes 157* v Chester Boughton Hall 1996
- A. G. Liggins 151* v Huyton 1950
- P. J. Horton 151 v Northern 2005
- J. Jackson 150* v Elton 2008 (National KO)

Best bowling figures

- H. S. Redhead 9-10 v Bootle 1947
- E. Davies 9-17 v Boughton Hall 1930
- G. Hazell 9-17 v Huyton 1963
- J. S. Curtis 9-24 v Oxton 1914
- Wilkinson 9-28 v Formby 1898
- W. Johnstone 9-28 v Birkenhead Park 1960
- W. Oakley 9-30 v Huyton 1894
- A. H. Boswell 9-34 v Birkenhead Park 1907
- E. Davies 9-39 v Birkenhead Park 1928
- H. Parker 9-39 v St Helens Recs 2003
