= Northern Club =

Northern Club may refer to:

- Northern Club (casino), the first licensed casino in Nevada
- Northern Club (sports club), a sports club in Crosby, Merseyside, England
- The Northern Club (Auckland), a long-standing social club in Auckland, New Zealand.
