= Noel Cooke =

English cricketer

Noel Henry Cooke (5 January 1935 – 28 February 1995) was an English cricketer active from 1956 to 1963 who played for Lancashire. He was born in Liverpool, joining Sefton CC as a schoolboy and making his 1st XI debut in the Liverpool and District Cricket Competition in 1952 whilst still at school and topped the Competition bowling averages in 1953 and 1955 before becoming the first player to score 500 runs (532 at 34.31) and take 50 wickets (52 at 10.92) in the same season in 1956 and was invited to play for Lancashire 2nd XI.

Cooke made his Lancashire 2nd XI debut in 1956, but had to wait until 1958 to make the first of his 12 first-class matches as a right-handed batsman who bowled right arm off break. He scored 242 runs with a highest score of 33 and held two catches. He took three wickets with a best analysis of two for 10. Cooke played for Cheshire in the Minor Counties Championship in 1962 and 1963.
