= Steve Wundke =

Australian cricketer

Personal information
- Full name: Stephen Christopher Wundke
- Born: 2 July 1961 (age 65); Adelaide, South Australia, Australia
- Nickname: Wunks
- Batting: Left-handed
- Bowling: Slow left-arm orthodox Left-arm fast-medium
- Role: All-rounder
- Relatives: Married

Domestic team information
- Years: Team
- 1983–1987: South Australia
- 1982–1999: Cheshire

Career statistics
Competition	First-class	List A
Matches	6	17
Runs scored	248	276
Batting average	24.80	23.00
100s/50s	–/–	–/1
Top score	42	54*
Balls bowled	198	595
Wickets	1	21
Bowling average	88.00	23.00
5 wickets in innings	–	1
10 wickets in match	–	–
Best bowling	1/16	5/24
Catches/stumpings	7/–	7/–
- Source: Cricinfo, 3 September 2011

Stephen Christopher Wundke (born 2 July 1961) is a former Australian cricketer. Wundke was a left-handed batsman who bowled both slow left-arm orthodox and left-arm fast-medium. He was born in Adelaide, South Australia.

== Early career ==
Playing junior cricket for Glenelg Cricket Club, Wundke first attracted notice in the 1976–77 season when he starred in the Shell Shield District Schoolboys competition and was named in the South Australian Schoolboy Team of the Year.

Wundke came to England, where in 1981 he trialled with the Leicestershire Second XI, but was not given a contract by the county after making nine appearances in that season for the seconds. During the 1981–82 Australian season Wundke represented South Australia at the Interstate Under 23 Cricket Carnival and returned to England for the 1982 season where he signed for Cheshire, making his debut for the county in the Minor Counties Championship against Shropshire. In that same season he made his List A debut against Middlesex in the 1st round of the NatWest Trophy. He again played Minor counties cricket for Cheshire in the 1983 season. and two appearances in the MCCA Knockout Trophy.

== South Australian career ==
Returning to Australia at the end of that season, Wundke made his debut for South Australia in a one day match in the 1983–84 McDonald's Cup. In his 15 one day matches for the state, he scored 266 runs at an average of 26.60, with a high score of 54 not out. With the ball, he took 21 wickets at a bowling average of 22.33, with best figures of 5/24.

During the 5 January 1985, McDonald's Cup match against Western Australia, Wundke took a catch to dismiss Kim Hughes that was classed as one of the best of the summer. Fielding at midwicket, Wundke "swooped, knocked the ball up with his right hand, reverse-swooped, and plucked it on the way down with his left."

His first-class debut for South Australia came in the 1985–86 Sheffield Shield. In his six first-class matches, he scored 248 runs at an average of 24.80, with a high score of 42. With the ball, he took just a single wicket, which came at an overall cost of 88 runs. The 1986–87 season was his last playing for South Australia.

== Wundke in England ==
In the 1989 season, Wundke returned to England, where until 1992 he played as a professional for Stockport Cricket Club in the Central Lancashire League. In 1990, Wunke scored the fastest half-century of the season in the League, scoring his fifty in twelve deliveries against Rochdale Cricket Club, including five consecutive sixes. In 1991 he scored 1,217 runs and took 100 wickets in a season, the first Stockport player to record the feat since Test cricketer Colin McCool in 1955.

Wundke played for Chester Boughton Hall Cricket Club in the Liverpool and District Cricket Competition between 1993 and 1997, scoring 3,368 runs (avge 42.10) and taking 307 wickets (avge 18.17) in 108 matches.

Having last played for Cheshire in 1984, he returned to the county in 1996 with three further appearances in the 1998 and 1999.,

Wundke settled in the county of Cheshire, England and has been the City Centre co-ordinator for the city of Chester He is currently the CEO for Taste Cheshire organisation, who promote local produce from the county.

== Sources ==
- Haigh, G. (ed.) (2007) Parachutist at Fine Leg, Aurum: London. ISBN 1-84513-256-4.
- Ryan, C. (2009) Golden Boy, Allen & Unwin: Sydney. ISBN 978-1-74175-067-6.
- South Australian Cricket Association (S.A.C.A.) (1977) Annual Report 1976-77, S.A.C.A.: Adelaide.
- South Australian Cricket Association (S.A.C.A.) (1982) Annual Report 1981-82, S.A.C.A.: Adelaide.
