= Chester Boughton Hall Cricket Club =

Cricket club based in Chester, England

Coordinates: 53.19074°N 2.86074°W

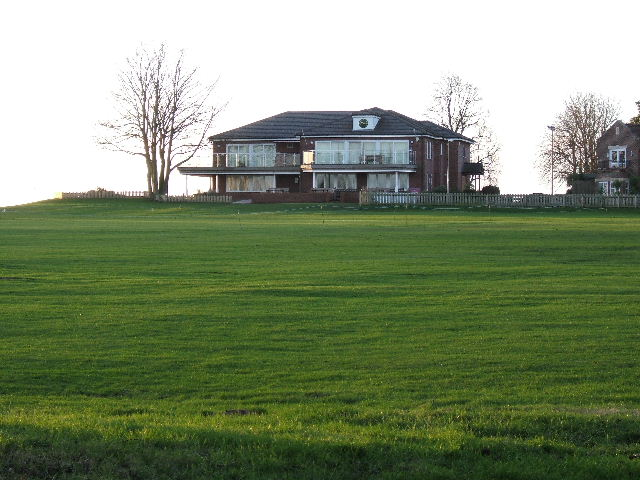
The clubhouse

Chester Boughton Hall Cricket Club (often called Chester BH) is a cricket club that is based in Boughton, Chester, England. The club has four senior XIs playing Saturday sides that compete in the Cheshire County Cricket League of which the 1st XI is in the ECB Premier League.

== History ==
The first game at Boughton Hall was played 20 May 1873.

In the 1870s Boughton Hall was a large private house standing in spacious grounds. The owner of the time, Mr John Thompson, acquired a taste for cricket on his scholastic travels which took him to Rossall School and then Cambridge. Thompson, upon his return, converted part of the Hall's grounds into a cricket field to which he invited friends to play, under his captaincy, as Boughton Hall Cricket Club. Early games were against local teams such as Eaton Park Club, 22nd regiment and Arnold House. Liverpool and Warrington also visited and played host to the ‘Hall but generally came second place to a club which was quickly established as the envy of the area. Even in these early days fixtures were commonplace against the likes of Huyton. Oxton, New Brighton and Birkenhead Park.

In the 1880s the club, now run by a committee and levying subscriptions, went from strength to strength and began to run a second XI. At this time there was a Chester and District League which accommodated teams such as Tattenhall, Bunbury, Chester City, Saltney, Buckley, St Oswald's and Flint. Boughton Hall, however, played teams further afield and in 1887 the inaugural fixture against Neston was played.

Fixtures played in 1900 included: Bootle, Neston, Western, Wrexham, Winnington Park, Warrington, Llandudno, Northern, Knutsford, Birkenhead Park, Eaton Park and Rock Ferry. Fixtures ran from 28 April to 8 September.

- 1910 The first County game in Chester. Cheshire stumbled to an ignominious defeat to Northumberland in what was described as ‘unkind weather’.
- 1913 The club allowed Chester Nomads Football Club (founded in 1904) to make use of the fine facilities. The Nomads had previously had no permanent ground. hence the name! 1913 also saw the inception of the Boughton Hall Knockout. The first victors were "Land Valuation" who saw off the challenge of the "Prudential" to take the title which is still played for today. The War saw a major reduction in fixtures but club members were able to keep the ground in order so that in 1919, returning War Heroes could once more don the whites. Pre and post war. the brothers Jones - LN and WE - dominated the scorecards of Boughton Hall and indeed Cheshire. There are many references in the Centenary book to centuries, hat tricks and even 10 wicket hauls. Not to mention 9 fors, county centuries etc. etc. These outstanding cricketers went on to play until 1939 and 1943 respectively.
- 1925 Post war cricket prospered, particularly at Boughton Hall, which saw the return of County cricket as well as its inception in the Liverpool Competition. Major ground development and the general growth of the club had seen a transformation from 'a rich man's club' to (in 1925) 'Boughton Hall Cricket Club Limited'. During the 20s, which are described as the halcyon days, the philosophy of the 1st XI was to score as many runs as possible - quickly and then bowl the opposition out. Tactics repeated by captains in latter years no doubt! With the Joneses, names like Pratt, Churton, Hack and Stockton coming to the fore the team swept all before them. Indeed, a match v Sefton in 1928 saw a remarkable crowd of over 5000 watching the carnage.
- 1930s The Boughton Hall Knockout was THE competition to be in if you were a local cricketer and crowds of over 1000 appeared to support their team. The trophy (still in use) dates from the 19th century and is the (then defunct) Chester and District Competition trophy. The club's success was mirrored between the wars by the 'superb condition of the ground'. The man responsible was a certain 'Mac' MacGregor. His only mechanical aid was that of a horse! He also umpired, coached juniors and even turned our for the 'extra' XI on a Wednesday. Another character of the day was Alf Snape who was persuaded to umpire a match and found himself in that post for the next 33 years. He also took a leading role in fundraising and earned a reputation as an objective reporter of the club's deeds in the local press. The 1930s ended with the emergence of a new generation of Joneses. The local paper found that the collective noun for the clan should be a plague! Bill, Leslie, Brian and Bruce all appeared to occasionally make six joneses in the 1st XI. In September came the War and with it an era had ended as LN Jones played his last game.
- 1957 Shared the Liverpool Competition title with Neston.
- 1974 Won the Liverpool Echo Knockout Trophy, beating Southport and Birkdale.
- 1980 Won the Liverpool Echo Knockout Trophy, beating Southport and Birkdale.
- 1982 Won the Liverpool Echo Knockout Trophy, beating Birkenhead Park.
- 1985 Champions of the Liverpool Competition. The side included Winston Benjamin on a Viv Richards Scholarship.
- 1986 Finished the season sixth in the Liverpool Competition after including Curtly Ambrose in their side. He was also on a Viv Richards Scholarship. Won the Liverpool Echo Knockout Trophy, beating Bootle.
- 1987 The side included Jenson Joseph on a Viv Richards Scholarship.
- 1991 Liverpool Echo Knockout Trophy finalists against Oxton.
- 1992 12 year old off spinner Edward R.M. Roberts, grandson of the afore mentioned Bruce Jones, made his 1st XI début at Ormskirk CC and took a wicket with his first ball, bowling their captain, Colin Mitchell.
- 1993 Former South Australia all rounder Steve Wundke joined the club. Won the Liverpool Echo Knockout Trophy, beating New Brighton.
- 1994 The club's most successive season to date, winning four trophies. They were champions of the Liverpool Competition, won the league's knockout, the play-off trophy and the coveted Cheshire Cup.
- 1995 Queensland all rounder Geoff Foley was overseas player for the first of three years at the club. Retained the Liverpool Competition league knockout title.
- 1996 Won the Liverpool Echo Knockout Trophy, beating Sefton. A day of records, CBH scored 193-1 and 201-1, Sefton 113-5 and 110-4, CBH won by 171 runs.
- 1997 Chester Boughton Hall's last season in the Liverpool Competition before joining the Cheshire County Cricket League for 1998.
- 2012 18 years since first lifting the trophy, the 1st XI won the Cheshire Cup against Hyde. Lee Dixon was MOM with a fine knock of 93. The 1st XI finished third in the Cheshire County Cricket League also this year.
- 2013 The 1st XI retained the Cheshire Cup and were champions of the Cheshire County Cricket League for the first time. Also won the Liverpool Echo Knockout Trophy, beating Bootle.
- 2014 The 1st XI won the NatWest Club T20 championship by beating Ashtead (Surrey) in the final at Wantage Road, home of Northamptonshire CCC. They also won the Cheshire Cup for the third successive season, and retained the Liverpool Echo Knockout Trophy, beating Wallasey by 161 runs. They have now won the trophy eight times.
- 2017 The 1st XI won the Cheshire County Premier League captained by Ross Dixon. The side also claimed their fifth Cheshire Cup in six seasons with a nine wicket victory over Neston.
