= Edward Roper (cricketer) =

English cricketer

Edward Roper (8 April 1851 – 27 April 1921) was an English amateur first-class cricketer, who played thirty six first-class games from 1876 to 1893. He played twenty eight games for Lancashire County Cricket Club from 1876 to 1878, and five matches for Yorkshire from 1878 to 1880. He also appeared for Gentlemen of the North (1879) and Liverpool and District (1891–1893) in first-class games and for Gentlemen of Liverpool (1884) and Gentlemen of Liverpool and District (1887) in non first-class matches.

Roper was born in Richmond, Yorkshire, England, and educated at Clifton College, where he was a member of the cricket eleven. He played his cricket with the Richmond, York and Yorkshire Gentlemen Clubs, but it was only after he moved to Liverpool and had established himself as the secretary and captain of Sefton C.C. that he was to make his first-class debut, for Lancashire in 1876. A right-handed batsman, he scored 715 runs at 12.76, with a best of 68 against Middlesex. His other half century, a knock of 65, came against Kent. He took nine catches in the field. He bowled only nine balls, but took a wicket, against Yorkshire, at the cost of six runs.

In 1893, he left Sefton to become the secretary of the Liverpool Cricket Club, a position he held until 1920. He first came to Liverpool when he went into a shipping business, which proved unsuccessful, but became so deeply involved in Liverpool society that he never left. He married Eleanor, a year his senior, and died in April 1921 in South Liverpool.
