= Ainsdale Cricket Club =

Cricket club in Merseyside, England

Ainsdale Cricket Club represents Ainsdale, a village of approximately 13,000 people on the northwest coast of England, close to the seaside town of Southport.

Historic records show that cricket has been played in the village since the year 1881. However the modern club was not founded until 1911 when it took up residence at Liverpool Road - the ground being donated to the Cricket Club by the owner at the time of the Railway public house. Today, other sports such as five and seven a side astro 3G pitches, bowls, darts, pool, and football are also played at the Ainsdale Club. The club is the only multi-sports club within the village, providing approximately 9 acres of sports fields for use by all age groups.

Ainsdale play their cricket within the Liverpool and District Cricket Competition. Ainsdale have 2 Saturday teams and a Sunday team, along with 5 junior teams and a strong number of members.

Aindale 1st XI play their games in the first division of the Liverpool and District Cricket Competition.

The second team which also plays on Saturdays won promotion to the 2nd XI premier league for the 2018 season.

The 3rd XI which play on Sundays are a mix of old players and young players.

The Ainsdale club has of 2017 new changing rooms, an improved clubhouse and is attempting to tie in with other groups to be at the centre of village activity.
