= Charles Jones (Lancashire cricketer) =

English cricketer

Personal information
- Full name: Charles Langton Jones
- Born: 27 November 1853; Litherland, Lancashire, England
- Died: 2 April 1904 (aged 50); Liverpool, Lancashire, England
- Batting: Right-handed
- Bowling: Unknown
- Relatives: Frederic Jones (brother)

Domestic team information
- Years: Team
- 1876–1888: Lancashire

Career statistics
Competition	First-class
Matches	11
Runs scored	165
Batting average	7.85
100s/50s	–/–
Top score	36
Balls bowled	11
Wickets	1
Bowling average	6.00
5 wickets in innings	–
10 wickets in match	–
Best bowling	1/6
Catches/stumpings	–/–
- Source: Cricinfo, 4 September 2012

Charles Langton Jones (27 November 1853 – 2 April 1904) was an English cricketer. Jones was a right-handed batsman, though his bowling style is unknown. He was born in Litherland, Lancashire.

Jones played his club cricket for Sefton between 1871 and 1903, being captain from 1893 to 1902, and made his debut in first-class cricket for Lancashire against Nottinghamshire at Old Trafford in 1876. His next appearance for the county came in 1882 against Yorkshire at Bramall Lane, Sheffield. Later in 1882, he made his first-class debut for Liverpool and District against the touring Australians at Aigburth. He would next appear in first-class cricket for Liverpool and Districts against Yorkshire in 1887, before playing four first-class matches for Lancashire in 1888. He made two further first-class appearances for Liverpool and District in 1889 against Yorkshire and Nottinghamshire, before making a first-class appearance for the team against Yorkshire in 1890. Jones made five first-class appearances for Lancashire, scoring 52 runs at an average of 5.77, while for Liverpool and Districts he made six first-class appearances, scoring 113 runs at an average of 9.41.

He died at Toxteth Park, Liverpool, Lancashire, on 2 April 1904. His brother, Frederic, also played first-class cricket for Liverpool and District.
