= Oxton Cricket Club Ground =

Cricket ground in England

Coordinates: 53.3801°N 3.0532°W

Townfield Lane
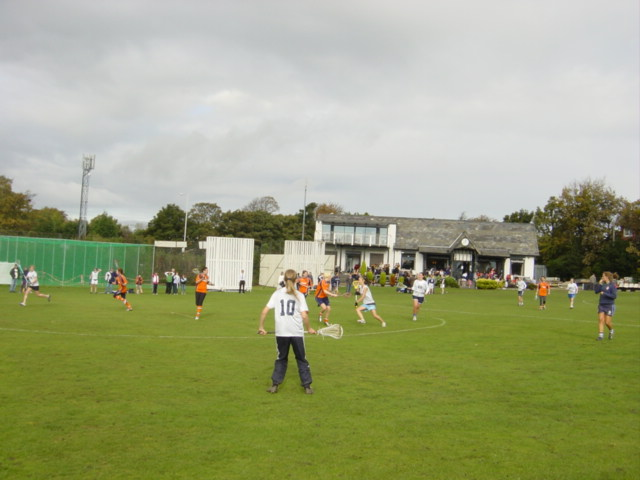
- Interactive map of Townfield Lane

Ground information
- Location: Oxton, Cheshire
- Country: England
- Establishment: 1882 (first recorded match)
- Owner: Oxton Cricket Club

Team information
Minor Counties	(1989)
Cheshire	(1895–2004)
- As of 20 August 2010; Source: Ground profile

Townfield Lane is a cricket ground in Oxton, Merseyside (formerly in Cheshire). The first recorded match on the ground was in 1882 when Oxton played Huyton. The ground was first used by Cheshire in 1895 when they played Worcestershire in the Minor Counties Championship. Cheshire used the ground during a number of periods in the 20th century. They played 49 Minor Counties Championship matches, with the final Minor Counties Championship fixture held on the ground coming in 2004 against Devon. The ground has also held 2 MCCA Knockout Trophy matches; the last of which was between Cheshire and Lincolnshire in 1987.

The ground has also hosted List-A matches. The first List-A match on the ground was between Cheshire and Yorkshire in the 1985 NatWest Trophy. Cheshire used the ground for a further List-A match in the 1986 NatWest Trophy against Surrey. The third and final List-A match played on the ground to date saw a combined Minor Counties team play Nottinghamshire in the 1989 Benson and Hedges Cup.

In local domestic cricket, the ground is the home venue of Oxton Cricket Club who play in the Cheshire County Cricket League.
