= Marlon Black =

West Indian cricketer (born 1975)

Personal information
- Full name: Marlon Ian Black
- Born: 7 June 1975 (age 51); California, Trinidad and Tobago
- Batting: Right-handed
- Bowling: Right-arm fast-medium
- Relatives: Trinidad

International information
- National side: West Indies
- Test debut: 23 November 2000 v Australia
- Last Test: 19 April 2002 v India
- ODI debut: 14 January 2001 v Australia
- Last ODI: 9 December 2001 v Zimbabwe

Domestic team information
- Years: Team
- 1993–2004: Trinidad and Tobago

Career statistics
Competition	Tests	ODIs	FC	LA
Matches	6	5	55	26
Runs scored	21	4	374	48
Batting average	2.62	2.00	6.67	6.00
100s/50s	0/0	0/0	0/0	0/0
Top score	6	4	21*	12*
Balls bowled	954	228	8,666	1,188
Wickets	12	0	166	24
Bowling average	49.75	–	29.46	32.62
5 wickets in innings	0	0	4	0
10 wickets in match	0	0	0	0
Best bowling	4/83	0/19	6/23	4/14
Catches/stumpings	0/–	0/–	8/–	3/–
- Source: Cricket Archive, 24 October 2010

Marlon Ian Black (born 7 June 1975, Trinidad and Tobago) is a former West Indian cricketer who played in six Tests and five ODIs, debuting in 2000.

He played his last international in 2002 due largely to an incident where he was attacked and badly beaten outside a Melbourne nightclub. Black had been out clubbing with his teammates Wavell Hinds and Sylvester Joseph to mark the end of their tour. Walking back to their hotel, they came across four drunk men smashing bottles on the road. The two groups got into a confrontation and when the men got aggressive the cricketers tried to flee. Hinds and Joseph got away but Black was knocked unconscious after being badly beaten.

Black now lives in Sunderland in England and has four children, having played club cricket for Sefton Park (1999), Huyton (2000–2003), Sunderland (2004–2005), Northern (2006), Bamford Fieldhouse (2008–2013), Crompton(2014) and Hylton since 2015.
