= Moor Park, Crosby =

Coordinates: 53.49689°N 3.01674°W

- Location within Merseyside
- OS grid reference: SD327005
- Metropolitan borough: Sefton
- Metropolitan county: Merseyside
- Region: North West
- Country: England
- Sovereign state: United Kingdom
- Post town: LIVERPOOL
- Postcode district: L23
- Dialling code: 0151
- Police: Merseyside
- Fire: Merseyside
- Ambulance: North West

Moor Park is a residential area of Crosby in Merseyside. Initially developed in the early years of the twentieth century, it is situated on the northern side of Moor Lane, the main A565 road out of Crosby to the north, and includes the tranquil setting of Moor Coppice.

It includes the tree-lined Poplar Avenue, Elm Avenue and Chestnut Avenue, and the Tithebarn, a masonic residential home set in its own grounds.

Chestnut Avenue, as its name suggests, is lined on both sides by many conker trees. At its northerly end is a public footpath, which leads between agricultural fields, and around the walls of Crosby Hall to Little Crosby.

Moor Park is also home to the Northern Club, situated in Elm Avenue, who moved there in 1907 while the residential site was in its infancy. The club has continued to evolve, and has facilities for cricket, hockey, crown green bowling and squash.
