= Warrington Phillip =

West Indian cricketer

Personal information
- Full name: Warrington Dexter Phillip
- Born: 23 July 1968 (age 58); Jessup, Saint Kitts and Nevis
- Batting: Left-handed
- Bowling: Slow left-arm orthodox
- Role: Bowler

Domestic team information
- Years: Team
- 1991–2000: Leeward Islands

Career statistics
| Competition | First-class | List A |
|---|---|---|
| Matches | 43 | 7 |
| Runs scored | 644 | 15 |
| Batting average | 14.31 | 7.50 |
| 100s/50s | 0/0 | 0/0 |
| Top score | 45 | 9 |
| Balls bowled | 9,766 | 363 |
| Wickets | 148 | 12 |
| Bowling average | 25.52 | 18.00 |
| 5 wickets in innings | 10 | 0 |
| 10 wickets in match | 3 | 0 |
| Best bowling | 8/92 | 3/25 |
| Catches/stumpings | 38/– | 2/– |
- Source: CricketArchive, 9 October 2022

Warrington Dexter Phillip (born 23 July 1968) is a former West Indian first-class cricketer and convicted murderer. He represented the Leeward Islands cricket team regularly in the Red Stripe Cup during the 1990s and played for his home island of Nevis in the inaugural Stanford 20/20, held in 2006, where they were surprise semi-finalists.

== Cricket career ==
Phillip took part in the Leeward's winning Red Stripe Cup campaigns of 1993/94 and 1995/96. He played a big part in the 1995/96 Cup Final against Trinidad and Tobago by taking three wickets in the fourth innings which helped his team to win by 73 runs.

Perhaps the biggest scalp of his career was Aravinda de Silva, whom he dismissed when the Leeward Islands took on the touring Sri Lankans at St John's in 1997. He has also taken the wicket of Trinidadian Brian Lara, bowling him in a Red Stripe match which the Leeward Islands won.

His best performance in a match came during the 1994/95 Red Stripe Cup when he was Man of the Match after taking match figures of 13 for 123 against Jamaica. Eight of those wickets came in the first innings, at the expense of 92 runs and he took the other five when Jamaica followed on. At the time of his last first-class appearance, only Andy Roberts has taken better match and innings bowling analysis for the Leeward Islands than Phillip. It was a good season for Phillip, with his tally of 28 wickets at 15.50 only bettered in 1996/97 when he took 35 wickets, but at a more expensive average of 29.25.

== Murder conviction ==
On 16 February 2006 in Nevis, Phillip's wife Shermel was found dead in the back of her car. Her throat had been slashed and Phillip was arrested and charged by police. On 15 November 2008, a jury in Charlestown found Phillip guilty of murder, and he was due to be sentenced on 22 December 2008, but this was deferred to 6 February 2009. He was sentenced to life in prison.
