= Wallasey Cricket Club =

Cricket club in Wallasey, Merseyside, England

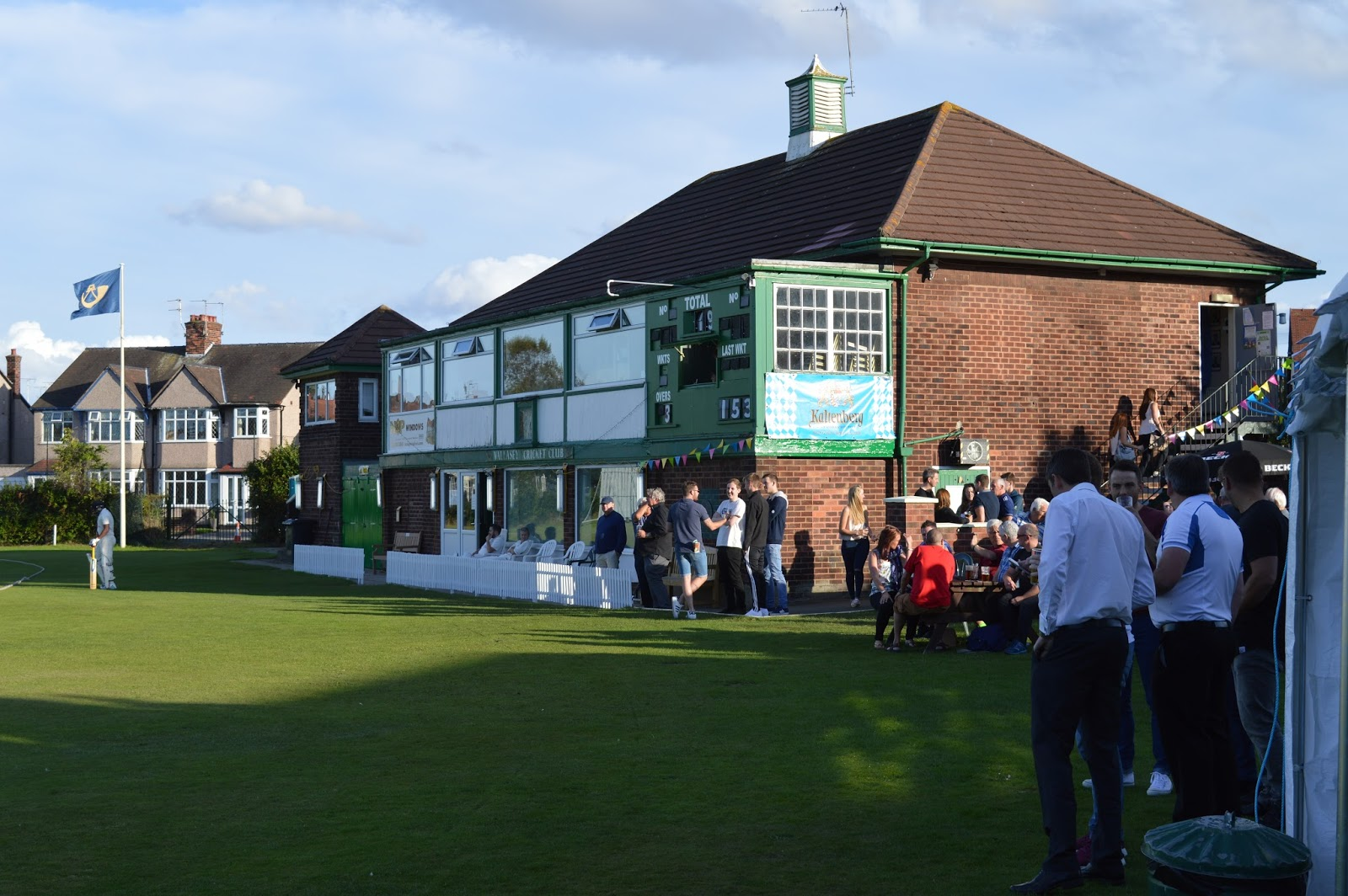
- Wallasey Cricket Club pavilion
- League: Liverpool and District Cricket Competition

Personnel
- 1st XI captain: (England) Greg Beaver

Team information
- Colours
- Founded: 1864
- Home ground: Kevin McCullagh Oval
- Official website: www.pitchero.com/clubs/wallaseycricketclub

Wallasey Cricket Club is a cricket club in Wallasey, Merseyside, England. The club was founded in 1864 and was an early member of the Liverpool and District Cricket Competition in which it still plays. It joined the then Liverpool Competition in 1919, taking over the fixtures of the Rock Ferry club which had not re-formed after World War I.
