= Saul Wade =

English cricketer

Saul Wade (8 February 1858 – 5 November 1931) was an English first-class cricketer, who played 66 matches for Yorkshire County Cricket Club from 1886 to 1890.

Born in Farsley in Leeds, Wade was a useful all-rounder, being a right-handed batsman and off spin bowler. He scored 1,616 runs at 16.83 in the seventy first-class matches he played in, with a best of 74 not out against Middlesex. He claimed thirty one catches, and took 139 wickets at 18.75, with a best performance of 7 for 28 against Gloucestershire.

He also appeared for M.B. Hawke's XI (1885), North of England (1887), Lord Hawke's XI (1889), L. Hall's XI (1889), Miscellaneous Yorkshire (1887–1890) and Blackpool and District (1893).

He was a leading all-rounder in the Leeds district for several years, before going to Saddleworth C.C. in 1880. He was later a professional in the Lancashire League with Church C.C. and Accrington C.C. Wade subsequently he became a first-class umpire.

Wade died in November 1931 in Oldham, Lancashire, aged 73.
