= Northern Club (sports club) =

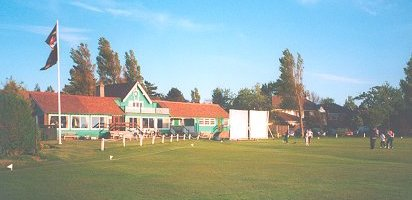

The Northern Club, located in Crosby Merseyside, was founded in 1859, originally as a cricket club. It moved to its present site, in the picturesque Moor Park area of Crosby, seven miles (11 km) to the north of Liverpool, in 1907. By 1961, the cricket club shared its grounds with hockey, squash and crown green bowls, and in this year the four sports merged to form the Northern Club.

The club is amongst the top multi-sport clubs in the North West of England, with around 1000 members. It has three cricket pitches, a hockey astroturf pitch, five squash courts and two bowling greens, all on the Moor Park site.

== History ==
The club was originally called the Northern Cricket Club, and the first clubhouse was situated in Rawson Road in Seaforth. Although the predominant sport was cricket, bowls was also played, and ladies indulged in archery. In 1879, the club re-located to premises north of Haigh Road, in the Waterloo Park area of Waterloo. A lawn tennis court was incorporated, and additional grass and cinder courts added later, and by 1888 the total membership numbered 70. The grounds were then sold in 1907, and the club moved to its current location while the Moor Park residential area was still in its infancy.

In the 1970s, Waterloo Park Cricket Club merged into the Northern, and when their former ground was sold in 1989, the Moor Park grounds were expanded with the acquisition of 9 acres (36,000 m^{2}) of farming land that are now cricket pitches. A synthetic hockey pitch and second bowling green were also added to the amenities. Ladies hockey came to Northern when Ormskirk Ladies Hockey Club, which had been founded in 1966, merged into the Northern in 1995.

== Awards and Accreditations ==
In recent years the club has been recognised both locally and nationally, with a variety of individual and collective awards. In successive years 2003 and 2004, Northern was voted Sefton's Sports Club of the Year, and has been commended in the annual awards since, where club players and volunteers have also been regularly recognised. Most notably, in 2006, Northern was awarded prestigious third place in the National Club of the Year Awards. In the same year, the squash section of the club was voted England Squash Club of the Year. In 2019, the club became Lancashire County Cricket's prestigious Club of the Year. In the cricket season of 2024, Northern became National Club Champions in the ECB Vitality T20 competition.
