= Raymond Digman =

English cricketer (1934–2009)

Raymond John Digman (14 November 1934 – 15 March 2009) was an English cricketer. He was a right-handed batsman and right-arm medium-fast bowler who played for Cheshire.

== Biography ==
Digman was born in Liverpool on 14 November 1934. He represented Cheshire in the Minor Counties Championship between 1955 and 1972, and in 1970 joined Sefton Cricket Club. Digman made two List A appearances for the team, though he scored a duck in each innings in which he played. He died in Spain in March 2009, at the age of 74.
