= Northern Cricket Club =

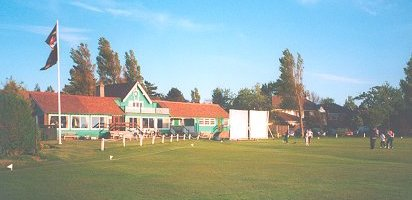

The Northern Cricket Club, located in Crosby on north Merseyside, England, was founded in 1859. The original clubhouse was in Rawson Road in nearby Seaforth until 1879, when the club moved to Haigh Road in Waterloo Park. In 1907 the club moved again, this time to its present site in the picturesque Moor Park area of Crosby, seven miles to the north of Liverpool. By 1961, the cricket club shared its grounds with hockey, squash and crown green bowls, and in this year the four sports merged to form the Northern Club.

The cricket club is a member of the Liverpool and District Cricket Competition, an ECB accredited Premier League, and were 1st XI champions in 2005, 2013, 2018 and 2021. The club runs five senior Saturday teams in total, all playing in this league, plus social Sunday and midweek teams, and junior teams at U9, U11, U13 and U15 age groups.

In season 2024, Northern became National Club Champions in the ECB Vitality T20 competition.

The club is amongst the top multi-sport clubs in the North West. It has three cricket pitches, all on the Moor Park site, and regularly hosts Lancashire second team and other representative matches.

== Prominent players ==
Johnny Briggs played cricket for Northern in 1878 and 1879. He debuted for Lancashire in 1879 aged just 16, and went on to become the only player in the county's history to score over 10,000 runs and take over 1,000 wickets (1,696 in all). Johnny played 33 tests matches for England, taking 118 wickets and scoring 815 runs. His test career was ended in 1899 by illness during the Headingley test match against Australia, and he met with a premature and unfortunate death just 3 years later.

Dr John Winter is probably the club's finest amateur player, first playing in the 1937 season. In 1955 he scored 1,423 runs, which remained a record until 2007 for runs in a season by any player in Liverpool Competition cricket, and hit 8 centuries in the process. He scored a total of 30 first team centuries for the club, despite a career interrupted by the war, the first in 1938 and the last in 1962.

New Zealander James Marshall played for Northern during the 2004 season, at the end of which he returned to his homeland to break into the Blackcaps' test match team in their series against Australia. James returned to Northern in 2005, to help the club to their ECB Premier League championship success of that year.

Like Marshall, Stephen Parry played for Northern in 2004 and 2005, being both the Premier League's Player of the Season and Bowler of the Season in the club's championship of 2005, before embarking on a professional career with Lancashire. In February 2014, Parry was named in England's squad for the limited-overs series in West Indies and the World Twenty20 in Bangladesh.

Phil Jaques played for Northern in 1999, via a cricketing scholarship award from New South Wales, and went on to play test match cricket for Australia from 2005. Phil also enjoyed a successful career in English county cricket with Northamptonshire, Worcestershire and Yorkshire.

The appointment of James Cole as 1st XI captain in 2010 was followed by a period of success for the team. A wicketkeeper with over 1000 catches and stumpings, and a batsman with over 13,500 runs, under his leadership Northern won 20 trophies in 17 seasons, including the ECB Premier League title in 2013, 2018 and 2021, and six Liverpool Comp Twenty20 wins (2012, 2014, 2021, 2023, 2024, 2026). In 2024, Northern became the Liverpool Comp's first National Champions, winning the ECB National Club Twenty20 knockout competition. In the same season, they also reached the final of the longer-format ECB National Club Championship, having previously also been finalists in 2015, and Twenty20 finalists in 2012. In addition there have been four LCB Lancashire Cup triumphs in 2013, 2023. 2025 and 2026, League Knockout wins in 2013, 2017 and 2025, and Echo Knockout wins in 2012, 2017 and 2025.
