= Reginald Wood =

English cricketer

Cricket information
- Batting: Left-handed
- Bowling: Left-arm medium

International information
- National side: England
- Only Test (cap 54): 25 February 1887 v Australia

Career statistics
Competition	Test	First-class
Matches	1	12
Runs scored	6	235
Batting average	3.00	15.66
100s/50s	0/0	0/2
Top score	6	52
Balls bowled	–	348
Wickets	–	8
Bowling average	–	16.75
5 wickets in innings	–	0
10 wickets in match	–	0
Best bowling	–	3/19
Catches/stumpings	0/–	5/–
- Source: Cricinfo, 30 December 2021

Reginald Wood (7 March 1860 – 6 January 1915) was an English cricketer.

The son of John Wood, a Birkenhead merchant, and Montreal-born Elizabeth, he was educated at Charterhouse and played six matches for Lancashire County Cricket Club as an amateur before emigrating to Australia. In 1885, he played two matches as a professional for Victoria, and then, when Billy Barnes was ruled out of a number of matches in Alfred Shaw's tour of Australia in 1886–87 after Barnes hit a wall rather than Australian captain Percy McDonnell, whom he was aiming for, the Englishmen had to find a replacement quickly. Wood was found and played three matches for Shaw's XI, the second one of which was the Second Test. He did not bowl and batted at number ten, scoring 0 and 6 and after one final game with the touring Englishmen never played first-class cricket again.

His life story is covered in the book Finally a Face: A Memoir of Reginald Wood by Philip Paine, which was published in 2007.
