= Oxton Cricket Club =

British amateur cricket club

Oxton Cricket and Sports Club
Personnel
- Overseas player(s): Jordan Collier

Team information
- Colours: Maroon and gold
- Founded: 1875
- Home ground: Townfield Lane

History
- Cheshire ECB Premier League wins: 0
- CCCL T20 Cup wins: 1
- CCCL T20 Plate wins: 2
- ECB National Cup wins: 0
- Official website: Oxton Cricket & Sports Club

Oxton Cricket Club is an amateur cricket club based at Townfield Lane, Oxton on the Wirral.

== History ==
The Oxton Cricket Club was formed in 1875 after a meeting of gentlemen on 27 September 1875 at the Queens Arm’s Hotel.

The gentlemen proposed that a cricket club be formed at Oxton and that a committee be appointed.

The club's first team plays in the Cheshire County Cricket League, which is one of the ECB Premier Leagues that are the highest level of the amateur, recreational sport in England and Wales. The club was founded in 1875.

Townfield Lane has hosted Minor Counties matches for Cheshire County Cricket Club for many years, plus List A matches in the NatWest Trophy.

== See also ==
- Oxton Cricket and Sports Club website
