= Liverpool and District Cricket Competition =

English cricket league

- Countries: England, Wales
- Format: Time (target 110 overs)
- First edition: 1892 (known as Liverpool Competition); 1949 (Officially constituted); 2000 (ECB Premier League)
- Tournament format: League
- Number of teams: 12 (1st XI ECB Premier League)
- Current champion: Formby CC
- Most successful: Bootle CC (16 titles)
- Website: Liverpool and District Cricket Competition

The Love Lane Liverpool and District Cricket Competition is regarded as the top level of competition for recreational club cricket in the Liverpool area and since 2000 has been a designated ECB Premier League. The Competition operates a three divisional system with Premier, First and Second Divisions. The Southport and District Amateur Cricket League is its feeder league.

== History ==
Although many of the district's clubs had met regularly as far back as 1850, if not earlier, it was not until 1892 that a Liverpool newspaper began publishing a weekly table and calling it the Liverpool Competition to create more interest in the game. The eleven senior clubs making up the original table were Birkenhead Park, Bootle, Formby, Huyton, Liverpool, New Brighton, Northern, Ormskirk, Oxton, Rock Ferry and Sefton.

Neston were offered first team fixtures in 1908 and, in 1919, Hightown and Southport and Birkdale joined whilst Wallasey took over the fixtures of the Rock Ferry club who did not resume after the First War. Boughton Hall (later known as Chester Boughton Hall) were invited to join in 1923. The Competition continued until 1947 when it was decided to admit a sixteenth club, and Preston were voted in. Two years later, fixtures were standardised by all clubs agreeing to meet each other, and although there was no suggestion of a league, it was decided to regard the table as official. Preston resigned at the end of the 1952 season to be replaced by St Helens Recs in 1953.

In recent years the Liverpool and District Cricket Competition has changed radically. There was an expansion in 1996 that introduced clubs from further afield in Lancashire and North Wales but saw founder members Birkenhead Park, Chester Boughton Hall, Neston and Oxton resign to join the Cheshire County Cricket League for the 1998 season. Of the four, only Oxton had failed to be champions of the Liverpool and District Cricket Competition. In 1999 a two division structure was introduced, and in 2000 the 1st XI Premier Division was awarded ECB Premier League status.

From the end of the 2004 season, promotion from and relegation to the Merseyside and Southport Cricket Alliance feeder league was introduced, but was then curtailed from the end of the 2009 season. At this time, additional clubs from the Alliance were invited to join, to form a new three divisional structure.

2nd XIs play in a similar three divisional structure but independent of the 1st XIs. There is a two divisional structure for Saturday 3rd XIs and below, with another structure for those clubs preferring to play on Sundays. They have three Divisions, Premier, Division 1 North and Division 1South .

== Champions ==
- League Champions 1949–1968
  Year	Club
  1949	Bootle
  1950	Bootle
  1951	Chester Boughton Hall
  1952	Liverpool
  1953	Liverpool
  1954	Liverpool and Southport and Birkdale (Note: Shared.)
  1955	Birkenhead Park
  1956	Bootle
  1957	Chester Boughton Hall and Neston
  1958	Hightown and Ormskirk
  1959	Liverpool
  1960	Birkenhead Park
  1961	Birkenhead Park
  1962	Birkenhead Park
  1963	Birkenhead Park
  1964	Birkenhead Park
  1965	Neston
  1966	Birkenhead Park
  1967	Sefton
  1968	Liverpool
- League Champions 1969–1988
  Year	Club
  1969	Neston
  1970	Neston
  1971	Ormskirk
  1972	Sefton
  1973	Ormskirk
  1974	New Brighton
  1975	Southport and Birkdale
  1976	Ormskirk
  1977	Ormskirk
  1978	St Helens Recs
  1979	Southport and Birkdale
  1980	Ormskirk
  1981	Liverpool
  1982	New Brighton
  1983	New Brighton
  1984	Bootle
  1985	Chester Boughton Hall
  1986	Birkenhead Park
  1987	Bootle
  1988	Birkenhead Park
- League Champions 1989–2008
  Year	Club
  1989	Bootle
  1990	Bootle
  1991	New Brighton
  1992	Neston
  1993	New Brighton
  1994	Chester Boughton Hall
  1995	Bootle
  1996	Southport and Birkdale
  1997	Bootle
  1998	New Brighton
  1999	Bootle
  2000	Wallasey
  2001	Ormskirk
  2002	Wallasey
  2003	Bootle
  2004	Bootle
  2005	Northern
  2006	Bootle
  2007	Bootle
  2008	Ormskirk
- League Champions 2009–2026
  Year	Club
  2009	Bootle
  2010	Lytham
  2011	Ormskirk
  2012	Lytham
  2013	Northern
  2014	Ormskirk
  2015	New Brighton
  2016	Leigh
  2017	Ormskirk
  2018	Northern
  2019	Bootle
  2020	League suspended
  2021	Northern
  2022	Wallasey
  2023	Ormskirk
  2024	Ormskirk
  2025	Ormskirk
  2026	Formby
- 2nd XI Champions 1999–2018
  Year	Club
  1999	Lytham
  2000	Sefton Park
  2001	Maghull
  2002	Newton le Willows
  2003	Southport and Birkdale
  2004	Hightown
  2005	Maghull
  2006	St Helens Recs
  2007	Formby
  2008	Northop Hall
  2009	Highfield
  2010	Leigh
  2011	Maghull
  2012	Wallasey
  2013	Birkenhead Park
  2014	Formby
  2015	Colwyn Bay
  2016	Ainsdale
  2017	Rainford
  2018	Southport and Birkdale
- 2nd XI Champions 2019–2023
  Year	Club
  2019	Wigan
  2020	League suspended
  2021	Wallasey
  2022	Rainford
  2023	Ormskirk
- 3rd XI Champions 2010–2023
  Year	Club
  2010	St Helens Recs
  2011	Ainsdale
  2012	Birkenhead Park
  2013	Sefton Park
  2014	Prestatyn
  2015	Burscough
  2016	Skelmersdale
  2017	Liverpool
  2018	Old Xaverians
  2019	Liverpool
  2020	League suspended
  2021	Northern
  2022	Wallasey
  2023	Merseyside Sports and Cultural Club

== Premier Division performance by season from 2003 ==
Key
Gold	Champions
Blue	Left League
Red	Relegated

Performance by season, from 2003
Club	2003	2004	2005	2006	2007	2008	2009	2010	2011	2012	2013	2014	2015	2016	2017	2018	2019	2020	2021	2022	2023	2024	2025	2026
Ainsdale															12									
Birkenhead Park												7	6	12						11		10	12	
Bootle	1	1	4	1	1	2	1	6	4	5	5	6	4	5	2	4	1		11				8	10
Colwyn Bay				2	6	7	5	5	7	11				10	4	9	11				12		11	
Fleetwood Hesketh			9	5	7	5	13				10	11												
Formby						10	14						5	2	10	3	5		5	7	5	4	7	1
Highfield								4	9	6	11		12			12								
Hightown			12		8	6	9	7	8	10	12													
Huyton	2	9	6	7	13																			
Leigh	7	4	10	6	14				3	4	3	8	9	1	7	5	9		3	3	3	6	3	5
Liverpool																								9
Lytham	4	2	5	11	5	4	4	1	6	1	4	3	8	9	9	7	12							
Maghull	9	12		9	11	13				9	7	12												
New Brighton	5	8	3	10	2	3	2	3	5	8	8	2	1	7	6	10	4		9	10	10	12		
Newton-le-Willows	12						10	8	11											12		8	9	2
Northern	8	3	1	3	4	8	8	9	2	3	1	4	3	4	5	1	3		1	4	2	2	2	3
Northop Hall	10	10	11				7	10	12															
Ormskirk	6	5	7	4	3	1	3	2	1	2	2	1	2	3	1	2	2		4	2	1	1	1	4
Orrell Red Triangle																	7		8	9	11			8
Prestatyn						9	11	12																
Rainford									10	12				11		11					4	3	4	6
Rainhill												9	7	8	3	6	8		6	6	9	7	5	11
Sefton Park		7	8	12															12					
Southport & Birkdale		11			9	12	12			7	9	10	11		11		10		10	8	7	11		
St Helens Town					12	14																		
Wallasey	3	6	2	8	10	11	6	11			6	5	10	6	8	8	6		2	1	6	5	6	7
Wigan	11																		7	5	8	9	10	12
References																		(Note: Coronavirus pandemic forced a reduction in league activity - halving the number of matches played.)						

== See also ==
- List of English and Welsh cricket league clubs
