= 2017 Yorkshire Diamonds season =

Yorkshire Diamonds
2017 season
- Coach: Paul Grayson
- Captain: Lauren Winfield
- Overseas player: Chamari Atapattu; Sophie Devine; Suné Luus
- WCSL: Group Stage, 5th
- Most runs: Katherine Brunt (141)
- Most wickets: Katie Levick (6)
- Most catches: Hollie Armitage (2); Alice Davidson-Richards (2)
- Most wicket-keeping dismissals: Anna Nicholls (4)

Yorkshire Diamonds played their second season in 2017. They competed in the Women's Cricket Super League, a Twenty20 competition. The side finished fifth in the group stage, winning two of their five matches.

The side was captained by Lauren Winfield and coached by the newly appointed Paul Grayson. They played one home match at Headingley Cricket Ground, and one at Clifton Park, York.

== Squad ==
Yorkshire Diamonds announced their 15-player squad on 26 July 2017. Age given is at the start of Yorkshire Diamonds' first match of the season (11 August 2017).

Name	Nationality	Birth date	Batting style	Bowling style	Notes
Batters
Hollie Armitage	England	14 June 1997 (aged 20)	Right-handed	Right arm leg break	
All-rounders
Chamari Atapattu	Sri Lanka	9 February 1990 (aged 27)	Left-handed	Right-arm medium	Overseas player
Laura Crofts	England	27 December 1991 (aged 25)	Right-handed	Right-arm medium	
Alice Davidson-Richards	England	29 May 1994 (aged 23)	Right-handed	Right-arm medium	
Sophie Devine	New Zealand	1 September 1989 (aged 27)	Right-handed	Right-arm medium	Overseas player
Teresa Graves	England	10 October 1998 (aged 18)	Right-handed	Right-arm medium	
Jenny Gunn	England	9 May 1986 (aged 31)	Right-handed	Right-arm medium	
Wicket-keepers
Anna Nicholls	England	30 October 1997 (aged 19)	Right-handed	Right-arm medium	
Lauren Winfield	England	16 August 1990 (aged 26)	Right-handed	—	Captain
Bowlers
Katherine Brunt	England	2 July 1985 (aged 32)	Right-handed	Right arm fast-medium	
Stephanie Butler	England	23 April 1994 (aged 23)	Left-handed	Right-arm off break	
Katie Levick	England	17 July 1991 (aged 26)	Right-handed	Right-arm leg break	
Suné Luus	South Africa	5 January 1996 (aged 21)	Right-handed	Right-arm leg break	Overseas player
Katie Thompson	England	28 September 1996 (aged 20)	Right-handed	Slow left-arm unorthodox	
Madeline Walsh	England	25 March 1997 (aged 20)	Right-handed	Right-arm medium	

== Women's Cricket Super League ==
=== Season standings ===
Pos	Team	Pld	W	L	T	NR	BP	Pts	NRR
1	Southern Vipers	5	4	1	0	0	4	20	2.001
2	Surrey Stars	5	4	1	0	0	2	18	0.291
3	Western Storm	5	3	2	0	0	0	12	−0.887
4	Loughborough Lightning	5	2	3	0	0	2	10	0.664
5	Yorkshire Diamonds	5	2	3	0	0	0	8	−0.318
6	Lancashire Thunder	5	0	5	0	0	0	0	−1.692

Source: ESPN Cricinfo

Advanced to the Final.
Advanced to the Semi-final.

=== League stage ===
11 August 2017
14:30
Scorecard

Yorkshire Diamonds; 162/4 (20 overs)	v	Lancashire Thunder; 134/7 (20 overs)
Lauren Winfield 44 (43); Danielle Hazell 2/34 (4 overs)		Amy Satterthwaite 28 (26); Alice Davidson-Richards 3/20 (4 overs)

Yorkshire Diamonds won by 28 runs
Headingley, Leeds
Umpires: Neil Bainton and Mike Burns
Player of the match: Alice Davidson-Richards (Yorkshire Diamonds)

- Lancashire Thunder won the toss and elected to field.
- Points: Yorkshire Diamonds 4, Lancashire Thunder 0

13 August 2017
18:45 (D/N)
Scorecard

Yorkshire Diamonds; 100 (19.5 overs)	v	Surrey Stars; 104/2 (17.3 overs)
Suné Luus 29 (32); Alex Hartley 3/15 (4 overs)		Marizanne Kapp 48* (47); Katherine Brunt 1/12 (3.3 overs)

Surrey Stars won by 8 wickets
The Oval, London
Umpires: Neil Mallender and Tim Robinson
Player of the match: Marizanne Kapp (Surrey Stars)

- Yorkshire Diamonds won the toss and elected to bat.
- Points: Surrey Stars 4, Yorkshire Diamonds 0

18 August 2017
16:00
Scorecard

Yorkshire Diamonds; 110/5 (13 overs)	v	Loughborough Lightning; 93/5 (13 overs)
Chamari Atapattu 66* (40); Kristen Beams 1/18 (3 overs)		Georgia Elwiss 41 (28); Chamari Atapattu 2/11 (3 overs)

Yorkshire Diamonds won by 17 runs
Haslegrave Ground, Loughborough
Umpires: James Middlebrook and Mark Newell
Player of the match: Chamari Atapattu (Yorkshire Diamonds)

- Loughborough Lightning won the toss and elected to field.
- Match reduced to 13 overs per side due to rain.
- Points: Yorkshire Diamonds 4, Loughborough Lightning 0

20 August 2017
14:30
Scorecard

Yorkshire Diamonds; 160/7 (20 overs)	v	Western Storm; 161/0 (17 overs)
Lauren Winfield 58 (44); Holly Huddleston 1/19 (4 overs)		Rachel Priest 106* (65)

Western Storm won by 10 wickets
Clifton Park Ground, York
Umpires: Ben Debenham and James Middlebrook
Player of the match: Rachel Priest (Western Storm)

- Western Storm won the toss and elected to field.
- Points: Western Storm 4, Yorkshire Diamonds 0

26 August 2017
14:30
Scorecard

Southern Vipers; 138/6 (20 overs)	v	Yorkshire Diamonds; 108 (18.3 overs)
Mignon du Preez 50* (35); Katie Levick 3/21 (4 overs)		Katherine Brunt 42 (30); Arran Brindle 2/13 (4 overs)

Southern Vipers won by 30 runs
Arundel Castle Cricket Ground, Arundel
Umpires: Ian Blackwell and Chris Watts
Player of the match: Mignon du Preez (Southern Vipers)

- Yorkshire Diamonds won the toss and elected to field.
- Points: Southern Vipers 5, Yorkshire Diamonds 0

== Statistics ==
=== Batting ===
Player	Matches	Innings	NO	Runs	HS	Average	Strike rate	100s	50s	4s	6s
Hollie Armitage	5	4	1	10	6	3.33	55.55	0	0	0	0
Chamari Atapattu	5	5	1	135	66*	33.75	126.16	0	1	19	4
Katherine Brunt	5	5	0	141	42	28.20	160.22	0	0	18	5
Alice Davidson-Richards	5	5	1	57	22*	14.25	76.00	0	0	3	2
Sophie Devine	5	5	0	55	41	11.00	117.02	0	0	6	3
Jenny Gunn	4	4	2	10	5*	5.00	62.50	0	0	0	0
Katie Levick	5	2	2	10	9*	–	111.11	0	0	2	0
Suné Luus	5	3	0	40	29	13.33	102.56	0	0	6	0
Anna Nicholls	5	2	0	9	5	4.50	90.00	0	0	1	0
Katie Thompson	2	1	0	0	0	0.00	–	0	0	0	0
Madeline Walsh	4	2	0	1	1	0.50	12.50	0	0	0	0
Lauren Winfield	5	5	0	135	58	27.00	103.05	0	1	18	2
Source: ESPN Cricinfo

=== Bowling ===
Player	Matches	Innings	Overs	Maidens	Runs	Wickets	BBI	Average	Economy	Strike rate
Chamari Atapattu	5	5	15.0	0	104	2	2/11	52.00	6.93	45.0
Katherine Brunt	5	5	16.3	3	95	3	2/15	31.66	5.75	33.0
Alice Davidson-Richards	5	5	14.0	0	100	5	3/20	20.00	7.14	16.8
Sophie Devine	5	3	4.0	0	41	1	1/16	41.00	10.25	24.0
Jenny Gunn	4	3	10.0	0	88	0	–	–	8.80	–
Katie Levick	5	5	17.0	0	114	6	3/21	19.00	6.70	17.0
Suné Luus	5	2	5.0	0	30	1	1/20	30.00	6.00	30.0
Katie Thompson	2	2	6.0	0	47	0	–	–	7.83	–
Source: ESPN Cricinfo

=== Fielding ===
Player	Matches	Innings	Catches
Hollie Armitage	5	5	2
Chamari Atapattu	5	5	1
Katherine Brunt	5	5	0
Alice Davidson-Richards	5	5	2
Sophie Devine	5	5	1
Jenny Gunn	4	4	0
Katie Levick	5	5	0
Suné Luus	5	5	1
Katie Thompson	2	2	0
Madeline Walsh	4	4	1
Lauren Winfield	5	5	1
Source: ESPN Cricinfo

=== Wicket-keeping ===
Player	Matches	Innings	Catches	Stumpings
Anna Nicholls	5	5	0	4
Source: ESPN Cricinfo
