= List of Yorkshire Diamonds cricketers =

This is an alphabetical list of cricketers who played for Yorkshire Diamonds during their existence between 2016 and 2019. They competed in the Women's Cricket Super League, a Twenty20 competition, during these years before being replaced by Northern Diamonds as part of a restructure of English women's domestic cricket.

Players' names are followed by the years in which they were active as a Yorkshire Diamonds player. Seasons given are first and last seasons; the player did not necessarily play in all the intervening seasons. This list only includes players who appeared in at least one match for Yorkshire Diamonds; players who were named in the team's squad for a season but did not play a match are not included.

== A ==
- Hollie Armitage (2016–2019)
- Chamari Atapattu (2017–2018)

== B ==
- Alex Blackwell (2016)
- Thea Brookes (2018)
- Katherine Brunt (2016–2018)
- Stephanie Butler (2016)

== D ==
- Alice Davidson-Richards (2016–2019)
- Gwenan Davies (2018)
- Georgia Davis (2019)
- Sophie Devine (2017)

== F ==
- Helen Fenby (2018–2019)

== G ==
- Katie George (2019)
- Cordelia Griffith (2019)
- Jenny Gunn (2016–2017)

== H ==
- Danielle Hazell (2016)
- Alyssa Healy (2019)
- Bess Heath (2018–2019)

== I ==
- Shabnim Ismail (2016)

== K ==
- Leigh Kasperek (2019)
- Delissa Kimmince (2018)

== L ==
- Beth Langston (2018–2019)
- Katie Levick (2016–2019)
- Suné Luus (2017)

== M ==
- Alice Monaghan (2018)
- Beth Mooney (2016–2018)
- Sophie Munro (2018)

== N ==
- Anna Nicholls (2016–2017)

== R ==
- Jemimah Rodrigues (2019)

== S ==
- Linsey Smith (2019)
- Laura Spragg (2016)

== T ==
- Katie Thompson (2016–2018)

== W ==
- Madeline Walsh (2017)
- Lauren Winfield (2016–2019)

== Captains ==
No.	Name	Nationality	Years	First	Last	Total Matches
1	Lauren Winfield	England	2016–2019	30 July 2016	28 August 2019	28
2	Katherine Brunt	England	2018	8 August 2018	8 August 2018	1

== See also ==
- List of Northern Diamonds cricketers
