= 2018 Yorkshire Diamonds season =

Yorkshire Diamonds
2018 season
- Coach: Paul Grayson
- Captain: Lauren Winfield
- Overseas player: Chamari Atapattu; Delissa Kimmince; Beth Mooney
- WCSL: Group stage, 5th
- Most runs: Beth Mooney (267)
- Most wickets: Katie Levick (11)
- Most catches: Lauren Winfield (5); Delissa Kimmince (5)
- Most wicket-keeping dismissals: Beth Mooney (8)

The 2018 season was Yorkshire Diamonds' third season, in which they competed in the Women's Cricket Super League, a Twenty20 competition. The side finished fifth in the group stage, winning three of their ten matches.

The side was captained by Lauren Winfield and coached by Paul Grayson. They played two home matches apiece at Headingley Cricket Ground and Clifton Park, and one at the North Marine Road Ground.

== Squad ==
Yorkshire Diamonds announced their 15-player squad on 11 July 2018. Age given is at the start of Yorkshire Diamonds' first match of the season (22 July 2018).

Name	Nationality	Birth date	Batting Style	Bowling Style	Notes
All-rounders
Chamari Atapattu	Sri Lanka	9 February 1990 (aged 28)	Left-handed	Right-arm medium	Overseas player
Thea Brookes	England	15 February 1993 (aged 25)	Right-handed	Right-arm off break	
Alice Davidson-Richards	England	29 May 1994 (aged 24)	Right-handed	Right arm medium	
Delissa Kimmince	Australia	14 May 1989 (aged 29)	Right-handed	Right-arm medium	Overseas player
Alice Monaghan	England	20 March 2000 (aged 18)	Right-handed	Right-arm medium	
Wicket-keepers
Gwenan Davies	Wales	12 May 1994 (aged 24)	Left-handed	Right-arm medium	
Bess Heath	England	20 August 2001 (aged 16)	Right-handed	—	
Beth Mooney	Australia	14 January 1994 (aged 24)	Left-handed	—	Overseas player
Lauren Winfield	England	16 August 1990 (aged 27)	Right-handed	—	Captain
Bowlers
Katherine Brunt	England	2 July 1985 (aged 33)	Right-handed	Right-arm fast-medium	
Helen Fenby	England	23 November 1998 (aged 19)	Right-handed	Right-arm leg break	
Beth Langston	England	6 September 1992 (aged 25)	Right-handed	Right-arm medium	
Katie Levick	England	17 July 1991 (aged 27)	Right-handed	Right-arm leg break	
Sophie Munro	England	31 August 2001 (aged 16)	Right-handed	Right-arm medium	
Katie Thompson	England	28 September 1996 (aged 21)	Right-handed	Slow left-arm unorthodox	

== Women's Cricket Super League ==
=== Season standings ===
Pos	Team	Pld	W	L	T	NR	BP	Pts	NRR
1	Loughborough Lightning	10	7	3	0	0	5	33	1.361
2	Western Storm	10	6	3	0	1	4	30	0.919
3	Surrey Stars	10	5	4	0	1	2	24	−0.404
4	Lancashire Thunder	10	5	5	0	0	1	21	−0.825
5	Yorkshire Diamonds	10	3	6	0	1	1	15	−0.290
6	Southern Vipers	10	2	7	0	1	0	10	−0.490

Source: ESPN Cricinfo

Advanced to the Final.
Advanced to the Semi-final.

=== League stage ===
22 July 2018
14:30
Scorecard

Yorkshire Diamonds; 162/5 (20 overs)	v	Western Storm; 166/3 (15.3 overs)
Delissa Kimmince 55*(41); Freya Davies 2/28 (4 overs)		Heather Knight 97 (62); Alice Davidson-Richards 2/31 (3.3 overs)

Western Storm won by 7 wickets
County Ground, Taunton
Umpires: Tim Robinson and Martin Saggers

- Western Storm won the toss and elected to field.
- Points: Western Storm 5, Yorkshire Diamonds 0

27 July 2018
14:30
Scorecard

Lancashire Thunder; 134/4 (20 overs)	v	Yorkshire Diamonds; 101 (18.2 overs)
Amy Satterthwaite 57* (34); Alice Davidson-Richards 2/15 (3 overs)		Lauren Winfield 28 (23); Sophie Ecclestone 3/11 (3.2 overs)

Lancashire Thunder won by 33 runs
Headingley, Leeds
Umpires: Mike Burns and Rob Bailey
Player of the match: Eleanor Threlkeld (Lancashire Thunder)

- Yorkshire Diamonds won the toss and elected to field.
- Points: Lancashire Thunder 5, Yorkshire Diamonds 0

29 July 2018
14:30
Scorecard

Surrey Stars	v	Yorkshire Diamonds

Match Abandoned
Woodbridge Road, Guildford
Umpires: Mark Newell and Tom Lungley

- No toss.
- Points: Surrey Stars 2, Yorkshire Diamonds 2

31 July 2018
14:30
Scorecard

Loughborough Lightning; 143/6 (20 overs)	v	Yorkshire Diamonds; 102/9 (20 overs)
Rachael Haynes 50 (41); Katie Levick 2/24 (4 overs)		Thea Brookes 30 (19); Kirstie Gordon 2/10 (3 overs)

Loughborough Lightning won by 41 runs
Haslegrave Ground, Loughborough
Umpires: Tom Lungley and Sue Redfern

- Loughborough Lightning won the toss and elected to bat.
- Points: Loughborough Lightning 5, Yorkshire Diamonds 0

2 August 2018
14:30
Scorecard

Yorkshire Diamonds; 175/5 (20 overs)	v	Southern Vipers; 163/9 (20 overs)
Lauren Winfield 64 (38); Amelia Kerr 2/27 (4 overs)		Suzie Bates 34 (22); Katherine Brunt 5/26 (4 overs)

Yorkshire Diamonds won by 12 runs
Clifton Park, York
Umpires: Tom Lungley and Sue Redfern

- Yorkshire Diamonds won the toss and elected to bat.
- Points: Yorkshire Diamonds 4, Southern Vipers 0

5 August 2018
14:30
Scorecard

Yorkshire Diamonds; 172/5 (20 overs)	v	Western Storm; 174/3 (19.2 overs)
Beth Mooney 69 (42); Heather Knight 1/27 (4 overs)		Smriti Mandhana 56 (36); Katie Levick 1/16 (3 overs)

Western Storm won by 7 wickets
North Marine Road Ground, Scarborough
Umpires: James Middlebrook and Chris Watts

- Yorkshire Diamonds won the toss and elected to bat.
- Points: Western Storm 4, Yorkshire Diamonds 0

8 August 2018
14:30
Scorecard

Southern Vipers; 159/7 (20 overs)	v	Yorkshire Diamonds; 143 (19.5 overs)
Tammy Beaumont 64 (37); Katie Levick 3/35 (4 overs)		Thea Brookes 45 (36); Suzie Bates 4/26 (3.5 overs)

Southern Vipers won by 16 runs
Rose Bowl, Southampton
Umpires: Neil Bainton and Tim Robinson
Player of the match: Tammy Beaumont (Southern Vipers)

- Yorkshire Diamonds won the toss and elected to field.
- Points: Southern Vipers 4, Yorkshire Diamonds 0

12 August 2018
14:30
Scorecard

Surrey Stars; 66 (16.4 overs)	v	Yorkshire Diamonds; 67/1 (9.3 overs)
Marizanne Kapp 13 (14); Beth Langston 3/14 (3.4 overs)		Beth Mooney 44* (30); Laura Marsh 1/20 (3 overs)

Yorkshire Diamonds won by 9 wickets
Clifton Park, York
Umpires: Sue Redfern and James Middlebrook
Player of the match: Beth Mooney (Yorkshire Diamonds)

- Yorkshire Diamonds won the toss and elected to field.
- Points: Yorkshire Diamonds 5, Surrey Stars 0

14 August 2018
14:30
Scorecard

Lancashire Thunder; 154/9 (20 overs)	v	Yorkshire Diamonds; 145/8 (20 overs)
Harmanpreet Kaur 74 (44); Katherine Brunt 3/22 (4 overs)		Katherine Brunt 44* (25); Alex Hartley 2/27 (4 overs)

Lancashire Thunder won by 9 runs
Stanley Park, Blackpool
Umpires: James Middlebrook and Rob White
Player of the match: Harmanpreet Kaur (Lancashire Thunder)

- Yorkshire Diamonds won the toss and elected to field.
- Points: Lancashire Thunder 4, Yorkshire Diamonds 0

18 August 2018
14:30
Scorecard

Yorkshire Diamonds; 148/6 (20 overs)	v	Loughborough Lightning; 145/6 (20 overs)
Beth Mooney 76 (50); Linsey Smith 2/18 (4 overs)		Rachael Haynes 47 (38); Alice Davidson-Richards 2/17 (3 overs)

Yorkshire Diamonds won by 3 runs
Headingley, Leeds
Umpires: James Middlebrook and Tom Lungley

- Yorkshire Diamonds won the toss and elected to bat.
- Points: Yorkshire Diamonds 4, Loughborough Lightning 0

== Statistics ==
=== Batting ===
Player	Matches	Innings	NO	Runs	HS	Average	Strike rate	100s	50s	4s	6s
Chamari Atapattu	8	7	0	85	43	12.14	96.59	0	0	10	2
Thea Brookes	9	8	2	139	45	23.16	120.86	0	0	13	6
Katherine Brunt	7	6	2	110	44*	27.50	120.87	0	0	12	2
Alice Davidson-Richards	9	8	1	148	33	21.14	94.10	0	0	18	0
Gwenan Davies	6	2	1	7	4	7.00	116.66	0	0	1	0
Helen Fenby	8	3	1	1	1*	0.50	20.00	0	0	0	0
Bess Heath	2	2	0	24	24	12.00	77.41	0	0	2	0
Delissa Kimmince	9	8	2	107	55*	17.83	117.58	0	1	10	2
Beth Langston	9	6	2	51	16	12.75	108.51	0	0	5	1
Katie Levick	9	4	2	1	1*	0.50	11.11	0	0	0	0
Alice Monaghan	4	3	1	2	1	1.00	25.00	0	0	0	0
Beth Mooney	9	9	1	267	76	33.37	138.34	0	2	41	0
Sophie Munro	1	–	–	–	–	–	–	–	–	–	–
Katie Thompson	1	–	–	–	–	–	–	–	–	–	–
Lauren Winfield	8	8	0	205	64	25.62	119.88	0	1	12	2
Source: ESPN Cricinfo

=== Bowling ===
Player	Matches	Innings	Overs	Maidens	Runs	Wickets	BBI	Average	Economy	Strike rate
Chamari Atapattu	8	7	14.0	0	122	3	1/15	40.66	8.71	28.0
Thea Brookes	9	2	5.0	0	27	3	2/23	9.00	5.40	10.0
Katherine Brunt	7	7	24.2	1	132	10	5/26	13.20	5.42	14.6
Alice Davidson-Richards	9	9	29.3	0	220	10	2/15	22.00	7.45	17.7
Helen Fenby	8	8	18.0	1	156	1	1/38	156.00	8.66	108.0
Delissa Kimmince	9	9	22.0	0	204	2	2/14	102.00	9.27	66.0
Beth Langston	9	8	24.4	0	190	7	3/14	27.14	7.70	21.1
Katie Levick	9	9	30.0	0	210	11	3/35	19.09	7.00	16.3
Katie Thompson	1	1	4.0	0	18	2	2/18	9.00	4.50	12.0
Source: ESPN Cricinfo

=== Fielding ===
Player	Matches	Innings	Catches
Chamari Atapattu	8	8	2
Thea Brookes	9	9	2
Katherine Brunt	7	7	0
Alice Davidson-Richards	9	9	3
Gwenan Davies	6	6	3
Helen Fenby	8	8	1
Bess Heath	2	2	0
Delissa Kimmince	9	9	5
Beth Langston	9	9	1
Katie Levick	9	9	1
Alice Monaghan	4	4	2
Sophie Munro	1	1	0
Katie Thompson	1	1	0
Lauren Winfield	8	8	5
Source: ESPN Cricinfo

=== Wicket-keeping ===
Player	Matches	Innings	Catches	Stumpings
Beth Mooney	9	9	5	3
Source: ESPN Cricinfo
