= 2019 Yorkshire Diamonds season =

Yorkshire Diamonds
2019 season
- Coach: Danielle Hazell
- Captain: Lauren Winfield
- Overseas player: Alyssa Healy; Leigh Kasperek; Jemimah Rodrigues
- WCSL: Group stage, 4th
- Most runs: Jemimah Rodrigues (401)
- Most wickets: Alice Davidson-Richards (10); Leigh Kasperek (10)
- Most catches: Jemimah Rodrigues (9)
- Most wicket-keeping dismissals: Alyssa Healy (8)

The 2019 season was Yorkshire Diamonds' fourth and final season, in which they competed in the Women's Cricket Super League, a Twenty20 competition. The side finished fourth in the group stage, winning five of their ten matches.

The side was captained by Lauren Winfield and coached by Danielle Hazell. They played two home matches apiece at Headingley Cricket Ground and Clifton Park, and one at the North Marine Road Ground. Following the season, women's domestic cricket in England was reformed, with the creation of new "regional hubs", with Yorkshire Diamonds replaced by Northern Diamonds, which retained some elements of the original team but represent a larger area.

== Squad ==
Yorkshire Diamonds confirmed their squad on 6 August 2019. Chloe Tryon was initially signed as an overseas player, but was ruled out due to a knee injury before the start of the tournament and replaced by Leigh Kasperek. Age given is at the start of Yorkshire Diamonds' first match of the season (6 August 2019).

Name	Nationality	Birth date	Batting Style	Bowling Style	Notes
Batters
Hollie Armitage	England	14 June 1997 (aged 22)	Right-handed	Right-arm leg break	
Cordelia Griffith	England	19 September 1995 (aged 23)	Right-handed	Right-arm medium	
Jemimah Rodrigues	India	5 September 2000 (aged 18)	Right-handed	Right-arm off break	Overseas player
All-rounders
Alice Davidson-Richards	England	29 May 1994 (aged 25)	Right-handed	Right-arm medium	
Leigh Kasperek	New Zealand	15 February 1992 (aged 27)	Right-handed	Right-arm off break	Overseas player
Wicket-keepers
Alyssa Healy	Australia	24 March 1990 (aged 29)	Right-handed	—	Overseas player
Bess Heath	England	20 August 2001 (aged 17)	Right-handed	—	
Lauren Winfield	England	16 August 1990 (aged 28)	Right-handed	—	Captain
Bowlers
Katherine Brunt	England	2 July 1985 (aged 34)	Right-handed	Right-arm fast-medium	
Georgia Davis	England	3 June 1999 (aged 20)	Right-handed	Right-arm off break	
Helen Fenby	England	23 November 1998 (aged 20)	Right-handed	Right-arm leg break	
Katie George	England	7 April 1999 (aged 20)	Right-handed	Left-arm medium	
Beth Langston	England	6 September 1992 (aged 26)	Right-handed	Right-arm medium	
Katie Levick	England	17 July 1991 (aged 28)	Right-handed	Right-arm leg break	
Linsey Smith	England	10 March 1995 (aged 24)	Right-handed	Slow left-arm orthodox	

== Women's Cricket Super League ==
=== Season standings ===
Pos	Team	Pld	W	L	T	NR	BP	Pts	NRR
1	Western Storm	10	9	1	0	0	3	39	1.109
2	Loughborough Lightning	10	7	3	0	0	4	32	0.792
3	Southern Vipers	10	4	4	1	1	2	22	0.425
4	Yorkshire Diamonds	10	5	5	0	0	0	20	−0.456
5	Surrey Stars	10	3	6	0	1	2	16	−0.857
6	Lancashire Thunder	10	0	9	1	0	0	2	−1.194

Source: ESPN Cricinfo

Advanced to the Final.
Advanced to the Semi-final.

=== League stage ===
6 August 2019
19:00
Scorecard

Surrey Stars; 130/9 (20 overs)	v	Yorkshire Diamonds; 121 (19.5 overs)
Sarah Taylor 43 (34); Helen Fenby 4/20 (4 overs)		Alyssa Healy 31 (17); Laura Marsh 3/17 (4 overs)

Surrey Stars won by 9 runs
Headingley, Leeds
Umpires: Jeff Evans and Nick Cook
Player of the match: Laura Marsh (Surrey Stars)

- Surrey Stars won the toss and elected to bat.
- Points: Surrey Stars 4, Yorkshire Diamonds 0

11 August 2019
11:00
Scorecard

Yorkshire Diamonds; 121/6 (20 overs)	v	Loughborough Lightning; 122/1 (13.2 overs)
Alice Davidson-Richards 27 (23); Kirstie Gordon 2/27 (4 overs)		Hayley Matthews 54* (39); Linsey Smith 1/7 (2 overs)

Loughborough Lightning won by 9 wickets
Headingley, Leeds
Umpires: Sue Redfern and Rob White
Player of the match: Hayley Matthews (Loughborough Lightning)

- Loughborough Lightning won the toss and elected to field.
- Points: Loughborough Lightning 5, Yorkshire Diamonds 0

13 August 2019
14:30
Scorecard

Yorkshire Diamonds; 151/6 (20 overs)	v	Lancashire Thunder; 142 (19.1 overs)
Lauren Winfield 56 (45); Kate Cross 2/31 (4 overs)		Harmanpreet Kaur 37 (37); Katie George 2/16 (2 overs)

Yorkshire Diamonds won by 9 runs
Aigburth Cricket Ground, Liverpool
Umpires: Tom Lungley and Ian Ramage
Player of the match: Lauren Winfield (Yorkshire Diamonds)

- Yorkshire Diamonds won the toss and elected to bat.
- Points: Yorkshire Diamonds 4, Lancashire Thunder 0

15 August 2019
14:30
Scorecard

Yorkshire Diamonds; 151/9 (20 overs)	v	Western Storm; 152/1 (14.5 overs)
Hollie Armitage 59 (56); Anya Shrubsole 1/16 (4 overs)		Rachel Priest 72* (43); Alice Davidson-Richards 1/27 (3 overs)

Western Storm won by 9 wickets
Clifton Park Ground, York
Umpires: Tom Lungley and Sue Redfern
Player of the match: Rachel Priest (Western Storm)

- Western Storm won the toss and elected to field.
- Points: Western Storm 5, Yorkshire Diamonds 0

18 August 2019
14:30
Scorecard

Yorkshire Diamonds; 129 (20 overs)	v	Loughborough Lightning; 135/4 (19.1 overs)
Jemimah Rodrigues 58 (40); Hayley Matthews 2/19 (4 overs)		Mignon du Preez 38* (22); Beth Langston 1/17 (4 overs)

Loughborough Lightning won by 6 wickets
Haslegrave Ground, Loughborough
Umpires: Neil Pratt and Ian Ramage
Player of the match: Mignon du Preez (Loughborough Lightning)

- Yorkshire Diamonds won the toss and elected to bat.
- Points: Loughborough Lightning 4, Yorkshire Diamonds 0

20 August 2019
14:30
Scorecard

Surrey Stars; 121/6 (20 overs)	v	Yorkshire Diamonds; 124/5 (19.5 overs)
Marizanne Kapp 39* (39); Katie Levick 2/13 (4 overs)		Jemimah Rodrigues 42* (33); Laura Marsh 2/15 (2.5 overs)

Yorkshire Diamonds won by 5 wickets
Woodbridge Road, Guildford
Umpires: Hassan Adnan and Mary Waldron
Player of the match: Jemimah Rodrigues (Yorkshire Diamonds)

- Yorkshire Diamonds won the toss and elected to field.
- Points: Yorkshire Diamonds 4, Surrey Stars 0

21 August 2019
18:30
Scorecard

Southern Vipers; 127/9 (20 overs)	v	Yorkshire Diamonds; 124/5 (20 overs)
Danni Wyatt 59 (30); Leigh Kasperek 4/16 (4 overs)		Hollie Armitage 34 (38); Suzie Bates 2/27 (4 overs)

Southern Vipers won by 3 runs
Rose Bowl, Southampton
Umpires: Neil Bainton and Alex Wharf
Player of the match: Danni Wyatt (Southern Vipers)

- Southern Vipers won the toss and elected to bat.
- Points: Southern Vipers 4, Yorkshire Diamonds 0

23 August 2019
14:30
Scorecard

Lancashire Thunder; 164/5 (20 overs)	v	Yorkshire Diamonds; 168/6 (18.5 overs)
Eleanor Threlkeld 52 (37); Katie Levick 2/19 (4 overs)		Alyssa Healy 77 (38); Sophie Ecclestone 2/18 (4 overs)

Yorkshire Diamonds won by 4 wickets
North Marine Road Ground, Scarborough
Umpires: James Middlebrook and Chris Watts
Player of the match: Alyssa Healy (Yorkshire Diamonds)

- Lancashire Thunder won the toss and elected to bat.
- Points: Yorkshire Diamonds 4, Lancashire Thunder 0

25 August 2019
14:30
Scorecard

Southern Vipers; 184/4 (20 overs)	v	Yorkshire Diamonds; 185/6 (20 overs)
Suzie Bates 47 (39); Alice Davidson-Richards 3/21 (4 overs)		Jemimah Rodrigues 112* (58); Tash Farrant 2/27 (4 overs)

Yorkshire Diamonds won by 4 wickets
Clifton Park Ground, York
Umpires: Hassan Adnan and James Middlebrook
Player of the match: Jemimah Rodrigues (Yorkshire Diamonds)

- Yorkshire Diamonds won the toss and elected to field.
- Points: Yorkshire Diamonds 4, Southern Vipers 0

28 August 2019
18:30
Scorecard

Yorkshire Diamonds; 104/4 (10 overs)	v	Western Storm; 99/3 (10 overs)
Jemimah Rodrigues 60 (27); Freya Davies 3/7 (2 overs)		Fran Wilson 45 (20); Linsey Smith 1/14 (2 overs)

Yorkshire Diamonds won by 5 runs
County Ground, Taunton, Taunton
Umpires: Mark Newell and Tom Lungley
Player of the match: Jemimah Rodrigues (Yorkshire Diamonds)

- Western Storm won the toss and elected to field.
- Match reduced to 10 overs per side due to rain.
- Points: Yorkshire Diamonds 4, Western Storm 0

== Statistics ==
=== Batting ===
Player	Matches	Innings	NO	Runs	HS	Average	Strike rate	100s	50s	4s	6s
Hollie Armitage	10	10	0	233	59	23.30	96.28	0	1	22	0
Alice Davidson-Richards	10	10	1	102	27	11.33	87.93	0	0	5	1
Georgia Davis	2	–	–	–	–	–	–	–	–	–	–
Helen Fenby	4	2	1	5	3*	5.00	100.00	0	0	0	0
Katie George	6	6	3	35	13*	11.66	100.00	0	0	2	1
Cordelia Griffith	3	3	0	18	12	6.00	56.25	0	0	1	0
Alyssa Healy	10	10	0	248	77	24.80	135.51	0	1	38	5
Bess Heath	8	7	2	22	9	4.40	84.61	0	0	1	0
Leigh Kasperek	10	7	3	28	12	7.00	96.55	0	0	2	0
Beth Langston	7	2	0	3	2	1.50	75.00	0	0	0	0
Katie Levick	10	2	1	1	1*	1.00	25.00	0	0	0	0
Jemimah Rodrigues	10	10	3	401	112*	57.28	149.62	1	2	55	3
Linsey Smith	10	4	2	11	6	5.50	73.33	0	0	0	0
Lauren Winfield	10	10	0	181	56	18.10	102.25	0	1	21	1
Source: ESPN Cricinfo

=== Bowling ===
Player	Matches	Innings	Overs	Maidens	Runs	Wickets	BBI	Average	Economy	Strike rate
Hollie Armitage	10	1	1.0	0	19	0	–	–	19.00	–
Alice Davidson-Richards	10	8	22.0	0	210	10	3/21	21.00	9.54	13.2
Helen Fenby	4	4	11.0	0	85	5	4/20	17.00	7.72	13.2
Katie George	6	6	20.0	0	137	4	2/16	34.25	6.85	30.0
Leigh Kasperek	10	10	32.0	0	239	10	4/16	23.90	7.46	19.2
Beth Langston	7	7	25.0	0	215	2	1/17	107.50	8.60	75.0
Katie Levick	10	10	31.3	0	195	8	2/13	24.37	6.19	23.6
Linsey Smith	10	10	34.0	0	260	8	1/8	32.50	7.64	25.5
Source: ESPN Cricinfo

=== Fielding ===
Player	Matches	Innings	Catches
Hollie Armitage	10	10	4
Alice Davidson-Richards	10	10	3
Georgia Davis	2	2	0
Helen Fenby	4	4	0
Katie George	6	6	1
Cordelia Griffith	3	3	0
Bess Heath	8	8	3
Leigh Kasperek	10	10	3
Beth Langston	7	7	1
Katie Levick	10	10	0
Jemimah Rodrigues	10	10	9
Linsey Smith	10	10	2
Lauren Winfield	10	10	3
Source: ESPN Cricinfo

=== Wicket-keeping ===
Player	Matches	Innings	Catches	Stumpings
Alyssa Healy	10	10	5	3
Source: ESPN Cricinfo
