= 2017 Lancashire Thunder season =

Lancashire Thunder
2017 season
- Coach: Stephen Titchard
- Captain: Danielle Hazell
- Overseas player: Jess Jonassen; Amy Satterthwaite; Lea Tahuhu
- WCSL: Group stage, 6th
- Most runs: Amy Satterthwaite (110)
- Most wickets: Danielle Hazell (9)
- Most catches: Sophie Ecclestone (3); Emma Lamb (3)
- Most wicket-keeping dismissals: Sarah Taylor (1)

The 2017 season was Lancashire Thunder's second season, in which they competed in the Women's Cricket Super League, a Twenty20 competition. The side finished bottom of the group stage, losing all five of their matches.

The side was captained by Danielle Hazell and coached by Stephen Titchard. They played one home match apiece at Old Trafford, Stanley Park and Aigburth Cricket Ground.

== Squad ==
Lancashire Thunder announced their 15-player squad in May 2017. Age given is at the start of Lancashire Thunder's first match of the season (11 August 2017).

Name	Nationality	Birth date	Batting Style	Bowling Style	Notes
Batters
Evelyn Jones	England	8 August 1992 (aged 25)	Left-handed	Left-arm medium	
Natasha Miles	Hong Kong	19 October 1988 (aged 28)	Right-handed	Right-arm medium	
All-rounders
Natalie Brown	England	16 October 1990 (aged 26)	Right-handed	Right arm medium	
Jess Jonassen	Australia	5 November 1992 (aged 24)	Left-handed	Slow left-arm orthodox	Overseas player
Emma Lamb	England	16 December 1997 (aged 19)	Right-handed	Right-arm off break	
Amy Satterthwaite	New Zealand	7 October 1986 (aged 30)	Left-handed	Right-arm medium	Overseas player
Wicket-keepers
Sarah Taylor	England	20 May 1989 (aged 28)	Right-handed	—	
Eleanor Threlkeld	England	16 November 1998 (aged 18)	Right-handed	—	
Bowlers
Kate Cross	England	3 October 1991 (aged 25)	Right-handed	Right-arm medium	
Rachel Dickinson	England	6 May 1998 (aged 19)	Right-handed	Right-arm medium	
Alice Dyson	England	28 January 1999 (aged 18)	Right-handed	Right-arm medium	
Sophie Ecclestone	England	6 May 1999 (aged 18)	Right-handed	Slow left-arm orthodox	
Danielle Hazell	England	13 May 1988 (aged 29)	Right-handed	Right-arm off break	Captain
Lea Tahuhu	New Zealand	23 September 1990 (aged 26)	Right-handed	Right-arm medium	Overseas player
Ella Telford	England	5 April 1999 (aged 18)	Right-handed	Right-arm medium	

== Women's Cricket Super League ==
=== Season standings ===
Pos	Team	Pld	W	L	T	NR	BP	Pts	NRR
1	Southern Vipers	5	4	1	0	0	4	20	2.001
2	Surrey Stars	5	4	1	0	0	2	18	0.291
3	Western Storm	5	3	2	0	0	0	12	−0.887
4	Loughborough Lightning	5	2	3	0	0	2	10	0.664
5	Yorkshire Diamonds	5	2	3	0	0	0	8	−0.318
6	Lancashire Thunder	5	0	5	0	0	0	0	−1.692

Source: ESPN Cricinfo

Advanced to the Final.
Advanced to the Semi-final.

=== League stage ===
11 August 2017
14:30
Scorecard

Yorkshire Diamonds; 162/4 (20 overs)	v	Lancashire Thunder; 134/7 (20 overs)
Lauren Winfield 44 (43); Danielle Hazell 2/34 (4 overs)		Amy Satterthwaite 28 (26); Alice Davidson-Richards 3/20 (4 overs)

Yorkshire Diamonds won by 28 runs
Headingley, Leeds
Umpires: Neil Bainton and Mike Burns
Player of the match: Alice Davidson-Richards (Yorkshire Diamonds)

- Lancashire Thunder won the toss and elected to field.
- Points: Yorkshire Diamonds 4, Lancashire Thunder 0

16 August 2017
14:30
Scorecard

Surrey Stars; 133/6 (20 overs)	v	Lancashire Thunder; 100 (18 overs)
Natalie Sciver 40* (36); Danielle Hazell 2/16 (4 overs)		Sarah Taylor 34 (30); Rene Farrell 5/26 (4 overs)

Surrey Stars won by 33 runs
Old Trafford, Manchester
Umpires: Neil Bainton and Graham Lloyd
Player of the match: Rene Farrell (Surrey Stars)

- Surrey Stars won the toss and elected to bat.
- Points: Surrey Stars 5, Lancashire Thunder 0

20 August 2017
14:30
Scorecard

Loughborough Lightning; 140/5 (20 overs)	v	Lancashire Thunder; 90 (17.2 overs)
Ellyse Perry 78* (57); Danielle Hazell 2/16 (4 overs)		Amy Satterthwaite 21 (23); Beth Langston 3/14 (2 overs)

Loughborough Lightning won by 50 runs
Stanley Park, Blackpool
Umpires: Ian Blackwell and Chris Watts
Player of the match: Ellyse Perry (Loughborough Lightning)

- Loughborough Lightning won the toss and elected to bat.
- Points: Loughborough Lightning 5, Lancashire Thunder 0

23 August 2017
14:30
Scorecard

Lancashire Thunder; 87 (20 overs)	v	Southern Vipers; 88/4 (14.5 overs)
Danielle Hazell 37 (39); Linsey Smith 3/16 (4 overs)		Danni Wyatt 46* (29); Sophie Ecclestone 2/19 (4 overs)

Southern Vipers won by 6 wickets
Aigburth Cricket Ground, Liverpool
Umpires: Ben Debenham and Paul Pollard
Player of the match: Danni Wyatt (Southern Vipers)

- Lancashire Thunder won the toss and elected to field.
- Points: Southern Vipers 5, Lancashire Thunder 0

26 August 2017
14:30
Scorecard

Lancashire Thunder; 122/5 (20 overs)	v	Western Storm; 123/5 (17.1 overs)
Amy Satterthwaite 44 (41); Freya Davies 2/24 (4 overs)		Rachel Priest 52 (26); Danielle Hazell 2/14 (4 overs)

Western Storm won by 5 wickets
County Ground, Bristol
Umpires: Tom Lungley and Russell Warren
Player of the match: Rachel Priest (Western Storm)

- Western Storm won the toss and elected to bat.
- Points: Western Storm 4, Lancashire Thunder 0

== Statistics ==
=== Batting ===
Player	Matches	Innings	NO	Runs	HS	Average	Strike rate	100s	50s	4s	6s
Natalie Brown	3	2	0	3	3	1.50	33.33	0	0	0	0
Kate Cross	4	3	1	28	19	14.00	107.69	0	0	4	0
Rachel Dickinson	1	–	–	–	–	–	–	–	–	–	–
Sophie Ecclestone	5	4	1	22	16*	7.33	110.00	0	0	2	1
Danielle Hazell	5	5	0	59	37	11.80	92.18	0	0	2	4
Jess Jonassen	5	5	0	42	11	8.40	80.76	0	0	5	0
Evelyn Jones	5	5	0	89	26	17.80	86.40	0	0	11	1
Emma Lamb	5	5	1	54	30*	13.50	71.05	0	0	6	0
Natasha Miles	4	3	1	3	2	1.50	30.00	0	0	0	0
Amy Satterthwaite	5	5	0	110	44	22.00	101.85	0	0	15	1
Lea Tahuhu	5	4	1	16	11	5.33	106.66	0	0	0	1
Eleanor Threlkeld	5	4	1	42	18*	14.00	89.36	0	0	3	1
Sarah Taylor	3	3	0	39	34	13.00	92.85	0	0	3	1
Source: ESPN Cricinfo

=== Bowling ===
Player	Matches	Innings	Overs	Maidens	Runs	Wickets	BBI	Average	Economy	Strike rate
Kate Cross	4	3	11.0	0	99	1	1/38	99.00	9.00	66.0
Sophie Ecclestone	5	5	20.0	0	104	6	2/19	17.33	5.20	20.0
Danielle Hazell	5	5	18.0	0	88	9	2/14	9.77	4.88	12.0
Jess Jonassen	5	5	19.0	0	148	3	2/27	49.33	7.78	38.0
Emma Lamb	5	1	1.0	0	11	0	–	–	11.00	–
Amy Satterthwaite	5	3	10.0	0	74	1	1/33	74.00	7.40	60.0
Lea Tahuhu	5	4	13.0	0	101	3	1/17	33.66	7.76	26.0
Source: ESPN Cricinfo

=== Fielding ===
Player	Matches	Innings	Catches
Natalie Brown	3	3	0
Kate Cross	4	4	0
Rachel Dickinson	1	1	0
Sophie Ecclestone	5	5	3
Danielle Hazell	5	5	1
Jess Jonassen	5	5	0
Evelyn Jones	5	5	1
Emma Lamb	5	5	3
Natasha Miles	4	4	2
Amy Satterthwaite	5	5	2
Lea Tahuhu	5	5	2
Eleanor Threlkeld	5	3	0
Source: ESPN Cricinfo

=== Wicket-keeping ===
Player	Matches	Innings	Catches	Stumpings
Sarah Taylor	3	3	0	1
Eleanor Threlkeld	5	2	0	0
Source: ESPN Cricinfo
