= 2016 Yorkshire Diamonds season =

Yorkshire Diamonds
2016 season
- Coach: Rich Pyrah
- Captain: Lauren Winfield
- Overseas player: Alex Blackwell; Shabnim Ismail; Beth Mooney
- WCSL: Group stage, 5th
- Most runs: Alex Blackwell (111)
- Most wickets: Danielle Hazell (7)
- Most catches: Jenny Gunn (4)
- Most wicket-keeping dismissals: Beth Mooney (4)

The 2016 season was Yorkshire Diamonds' first season, in which they competed in the Women's Cricket Super League, a Twenty20 competition. The side finished fifth in the group stage, winning one of their five matches.

The side was partnered with Yorkshire County Cricket Club, and played their home matches at Headingley Cricket Ground. They were captained by Lauren Winfield and coached by Rich Pyrah.

== Squad ==
Yorkshire Diamonds announced their 15-player squad on 21 April 2016. Age given is at the start of Yorkshire Diamonds' first match of the season (30 July 2016).

Name	Nationality	Birth date	Batting Style	Bowling Style	Notes
Batters
Hollie Armitage	England	14 June 1997 (aged 19)	Right-handed	Right-arm leg break	
Alex Blackwell	Australia	31 August 1983 (aged 32)	Right-handed	Right-arm medium	Overseas player
All-rounders
Alice Davidson-Richards	England	29 May 1994 (aged 22)	Right-handed	Right arm medium	
Teresa Graves	England	10 October 1998 (aged 17)	Right-handed	Right-arm medium	
Jenny Gunn	England	9 May 1986 (aged 30)	Right-handed	Right-arm medium	
Wicket-keepers
Beth Mooney	Australia	14 January 1994 (aged 22)	Left-handed	—	Overseas player
Anna Nicholls	England	30 October 1997 (aged 18)	Right-handed	Right-arm medium	
Lauren Winfield	England	16 August 1990 (aged 25)	Right-handed	—	Captain
Bowlers
Stephanie Butler	England	23 April 1994 (aged 22)	Left-handed	Right-arm off break	
Katherine Brunt	England	2 July 1985 (aged 31)	Right-handed	Right-arm fast-medium	
Danielle Hazell	England	13 May 1988 (aged 28)	Right-handed	Right-arm off break	
Shabnim Ismail	South Africa	5 October 1988 (aged 27)	Left-handed	Right-arm fast-medium	Overseas player
Katie Levick	England	17 July 1991 (aged 25)	Right-handed	Right-arm leg break	
Laura Spragg	England	16 June 1982 (aged 34)	Left-handed	Left-arm medium	
Katie Thompson	England	28 September 1996 (aged 19)	Right-handed	Slow left-arm unorthodox	

== Women's Cricket Super League ==
=== Season standings ===
Points table
Pos	Team	Pld	W	L	T	NR	BP	Pts	NRR
1	Southern Vipers	5	4	1	0	0	3	11	1.437
2	Western Storm	5	4	1	0	0	1	9	0.838
3	Loughborough Lightning	5	3	2	0	0	2	8	0.170
4	Surrey Stars	5	2	3	0	0	1	5	−0.274
5	Yorkshire Diamonds	5	1	4	0	0	1	3	−0.362
6	Lancashire Thunder	5	1	4	0	0	0	2	−1.724

Source: ESPN Cricinfo

Advanced to the Final.
Advanced to the Semi-final.

=== League stage ===
30 July
14:30
Scorecard

Loughborough Lightning; 128/9 (20 overs)	v	Yorkshire Diamonds; 85 (17.1 overs)
Sophie Devine 52 (38); Jenny Gunn 2/20 (4 overs)		Lauren Winfield 23 (13); Rebecca Grundy 3/21 (4 overs)

Loughborough Lightning won by 43 runs
Headingley, Leeds
Umpires: Ben Debenham and Tom Lungley

- Loughborough Lightning won the toss and elected to bat.
- Points: Loughborough Lightning 3, Yorkshire Diamonds 0

4 August
18:30 (D/N)
Scorecard

Yorkshire Diamonds; 134/5 (20 overs)	v	Surrey Stars; 135/4 (18.1 overs)
Hollie Armitage 43 (36); Alex Hartley 2/18 (4 overs)		Tammy Beaumont 47 (45); Jenny Gunn 2/19 (4 overs)

Surrey Stars won by 6 wickets
The Oval, London
Umpires: Ian Blackwell and Russell Warren

- Yorkshire Diamonds won the toss and elected to bat.
- Points: Surrey Stars 2, Yorkshire Diamonds 0

8 August
14:30
Scorecard

Southern Vipers; 118/4 (20 overs)	v	Yorkshire Diamonds; 64 (16.3 overs)
Suzie Bates 45* (45); Katherine Brunt 2/26 (4 overs)		Beth Mooney 17 (23); Linsey Smith 4/10 (4 overs)

Southern Vipers won by 54 runs
Rose Bowl, Southampton
Umpires: Ben Debenham and Chris Watts

- Southern Vipers won the toss and elected to bat.
- Points: Southern Vipers 3, Yorkshire Diamonds 0

12 August
18:00 (D/N)
Scorecard

Yorkshire Diamonds; 166/6 (20 overs)	v	Lancashire Thunder; 71 (15 overs)
Alex Blackwell 59 (42); Hayley Matthews 1/21 (4 overs)		Deandra Dottin 25 (24); Danielle Hazell 4/10 (4 overs)

Yorkshire Diamonds won by 95 runs
Old Trafford, Manchester
Umpires: Ben Debenham and Chris Watts

- Yorkshire Diamonds won the toss and elected to bat.
- Points: Yorkshire Diamonds 3, Lancashire Thunder 0

14 August
14:30
Scorecard

Yorkshire Diamonds; 118 (20 overs)	v	Western Storm; 119/4 (16.3 overs)
Beth Mooney 56 (44); Anya Shrubsole 5/23 (4 overs)		Rachel Priest 50 (35); Shabnim Ismail 2/16 (2 overs)

Western Storm won by 6 wickets
Headingley, Leeds
Umpires: Paul Pollard and Chris Watts

- Western Storm won the toss and elected to field.
- Points: Western Storm 2, Yorkshire Diamonds 0

== Statistics ==
=== Batting ===
Player	Matches	Innings	NO	Runs	HS	Average	Strike rate	100s	50s	4s	6s
Hollie Armitage	5	5	0	60	43	12.00	98.36	0	0	9	0
Alex Blackwell	5	5	0	111	59	22.20	115.62	0	1	9	2
Katherine Brunt	5	5	1	71	36	17.75	112.69	0	0	6	1
Stephanie Butler	4	2	1	0	0*	0.00	0.00	0	0	0	0
Alice Davidson-Richards	4	4	1	27	10	9.00	71.05	0	0	2	0
Jenny Gunn	5	4	1	16	8*	5.33	55.17	0	0	2	0
Danielle Hazell	5	5	1	28	15	7.00	66.66	0	0	2	0
Shabnim Ismail	5	3	1	1	1*	0.50	8.33	0	0	0	0
Katie Levick	4	3	0	2	1	0.66	13.33	0	0	0	0
Beth Mooney	5	5	0	100	56	20.00	94.33	0	1	11	0
Anna Nicholls	1	1	0	2	2	2.00	40.00	0	0	0	0
Laura Spragg	1	–	–	–	–	–	–	–	–	–	–
Katie Thompson	1	1	1	2	2*	–	66.66	0	0	0	0
Lauren Winfield	5	5	0	106	32	21.20	117.77	0	0	20	0
Source: ESPN Cricinfo

=== Bowling ===
Player	Matches	Innings	Overs	Maidens	Runs	Wickets	BBI	Average	Economy	Strike rate
Hollie Armitage	5	1	2.0	0	13	0	–	–	6.50	–
Katherine Brunt	5	5	17.0	2	91	6	3/6	15.16	5.35	17.0
Stephanie Butler	4	2	6.0	0	44	2	2/24	22.0	7.33	18.0
Jenny Gunn	5	5	14.0	1	91	4	2/19	22.75	6.50	21.0
Danielle Hazell	5	5	18.4	0	100	7	4/10	14.28	5.35	16.0
Shabnim Ismail	5	5	16.0	0	89	6	2/16	14.83	5.56	16.0
Katie Levick	4	4	14.0	1	91	4	1/10	22.75	6.50	21.0
Laura Spragg	1	1	1.0	0	16	0	–	–	16.00	–
Katie Thompson	1	1	1.0	0	7	0	–	–	7.00	–
Source: ESPN Cricinfo

=== Fielding ===
Player	Matches	Innings	Catches
Hollie Armitage	5	5	3
Alex Blackwell	5	5	2
Katherine Brunt	5	5	1
Stephanie Butler	4	4	0
Alice Davidson-Richards	4	4	1
Jenny Gunn	5	5	4
Danielle Hazell	5	5	0
Shabnim Ismail	5	5	2
Katie Levick	4	4	1
Anna Nicholls	1	1	0
Laura Spragg	1	1	1
Katie Thompson	1	1	0
Lauren Winfield	5	5	1
Source: ESPN Cricinfo

=== Wicket-keeping ===
Player	Matches	Innings	Catches	Stumpings
Beth Mooney	5	5	1	3
Source: ESPN Cricinfo
