= 2016 Western Storm season =

English cricket season

Western Storm
2016 season
- Coach: Caroline Foster
- Captain: Heather Knight
- Overseas player: Lizelle Lee; Rachel Priest; Stafanie Taylor
- WCSL: Runners-up
- Most runs: Stafanie Taylor (289)
- Most wickets: Stafanie Taylor (11)
- Most catches: Lizelle Lee (4)
- Most wicket-keeping dismissals: Rachel Priest (6)

The 2016 season was Western Storm's first season, in which they competed in the Women's Cricket Super League, a Twenty20 competition. The side finished second in the initial group stage, therefore progressing to the semi-final, where they beat Loughborough Lightning by 5 wickets. In the final, they played against Southern Vipers but lost the game by 7 wickets to finish as runners-up.

The side represented the South West of England, and was partnered with Somerset County Cricket Club, Gloucestershire County Cricket Club and the University of Exeter. They played two of their home matches at the County Ground, Taunton and one at the County Ground, Bristol. Western Storm's coach was Caroline Foster, and they were captained by Heather Knight.

== Squad ==
Western Storm announced a 15-player squad on 21 April 2016. Age given is at the start of Western Storm's first match of the season (31 July 2016).

Name	Nationality	Birth date	Batting style	Bowling style	Notes
Batters
Lizelle Lee	South Africa	2 April 1992 (aged 24)	Right-handed	Right-arm medium	Overseas player
Sophie Luff	England	6 December 1993 (aged 22)	Right-handed	Right-arm medium	
Fran Wilson	England	7 November 1991 (aged 24)	Right-handed	Right-arm off break	
All-rounders
Rosalie Birch	England	6 December 1983 (aged 32)	Right-handed	Right-arm off break	
Georgia Hennessy	England	4 November 1996 (aged 19)	Right-handed	Right-arm medium	
Heather Knight	England	26 December 1990 (aged 25)	Right-handed	Right-arm off break	Captain
Sophie Mackenzie	England	21 November 1998 (aged 17)	Right-handed	Right-arm medium	
Caitlin O'Keefe	England	16 December 1996 (aged 19)	Right-handed	Right-arm medium	
Stafanie Taylor	West Indies	11 June 1991 (aged 25)	Right-handed	Right-arm off break	Overseas player
Izzy Westbury	England	8 March 1990 (aged 26)	Right-handed	Right-arm off break	
Wicket-keepers
Amara Carr	England	17 April 1994 (aged 22)	Right-handed	—	
Rachel Priest	New Zealand	13 June 1985 (aged 31)	Right-handed	—	Overseas player
Bowlers
Freya Davies	England	27 October 1995 (aged 20)	Right-handed	Right-arm medium	
Jodie Dibble	England	17 September 1994 (aged 21)	Right-handed	Slow left-arm orthodox	
Anya Shrubsole	England	7 December 1991 (aged 24)	Right-handed	Right-arm medium	

== Women's Cricket Super League ==
=== Season standings ===
Points table
Pos	Team	Pld	W	L	T	NR	BP	Pts	NRR
1	Southern Vipers	5	4	1	0	0	3	11	1.437
2	Western Storm	5	4	1	0	0	1	9	0.838
3	Loughborough Lightning	5	3	2	0	0	2	8	0.170
4	Surrey Stars	5	2	3	0	0	1	5	−0.274
5	Yorkshire Diamonds	5	1	4	0	0	1	3	−0.362
6	Lancashire Thunder	5	1	4	0	0	0	2	−1.724

Source: ESPN Cricinfo

Advanced to the Final.
Advanced to the Semi-final.

=== League stage ===
31 July
14:30
Scorecard

Lancashire Thunder; 83 (18.3 overs)	v	Western Storm; 86/6 (15.3 overs)
Emma Lamb 25 (27); Heather Knight 3/11 (4 overs)		Heather Knight 23 (25); Deandra Dottin 3/8 (3 overs)

Western Storm won by 4 wickets
County Ground, Taunton
Umpires: Russell Warren and Chris Watts

- Lancashire Thunder won the toss and elected to bat.
- Points: Western Storm 3, Lancashire Thunder 0.

5 August
16:30 (D/N)
Scorecard

Loughborough Lightning; 158/8 (20 overs)	v	Western Storm; 153/5 (20 overs)
Amy Jones 46 (30); Anya Shrubsole 2/26 (4 overs)		Heather Knight 74 (46); Sonia Odedra 2/20 (4 overs)

Loughborough Lightning won by 5 runs
Haslegrave Ground, Loughborough
Umpires: Ben Debenham and Russell Warren

- Loughborough Lightning won the toss and elected to bat.
- Points: Loughborough Lightning 2, Western Storm 0.

7 August
14:30
Scorecard

Surrey Stars; 161/6 (20 overs)	v	Western Storm; 165/5 (19.4 overs)
Nat Sciver 90* (45); Freya Davies 2/38 (4 overs)		Stafanie Taylor 74* (48); Nat Sciver 2/17 (4 overs)

Western Storm won by 5 wickets
County Ground, Bristol
Umpires: Ben Debenham (Eng) and Chris Watts (Eng)

- Surrey Stars won the toss and elected to bat.
- Points: Western Storm 2, Surrey Stars 0.

12 August
17:30 (D/N)
Scorecard

Southern Vipers; 137/3 (20 overs)	v	Western Storm; 140/2 (17.5 overs)
Suzie Bates 57 (50); Heather Knight 2/27 (4 overs)		Stafanie Taylor 78* (51); Fi Morris 1/10 (1 over)

Western Storm won by 8 wickets
County Ground, Taunton
Umpires: Ian Blackwell (Eng) and Tom Lungley (Eng)

- Southern Vipers won the toss and elected to bat.
- Points: Western Storm 2, Southern Vipers 0.

14 August
14:30
Scorecard

Yorkshire Diamonds; 118 (20 overs)	v	Western Storm; 119/4 (16.3 overs)
Beth Mooney 56 (44); Anya Shrubsole 5/23 (4 overs)		Rachel Priest 50 (35); Shabnim Ismail 2/16 (2 overs)

Western Storm won by 6 wickets
Headingley, Leeds
Umpires: Paul Pollard (Eng) and Chris Watts (Eng)

- Western Storm won the toss and elected to field.
- Points: Western Storm 2, Yorkshire Diamonds 0.

=== Semi-final ===
21 August
11:00
Scorecard

Loughborough Lightning; 124/7 (20 overs)	v	Western Storm; 128/5 (19.3 overs)
Ellyse Perry 64* (48); Stafanie Taylor 3/31 (4 overs)		Heather Knight 52 (43); Dane van Niekerk 2/21 (4 overs)

Western Storm won by 5 wickets
County Cricket Ground, Chelmsford
Umpires: Ben Debenham (Eng) and Tom Lungley (Eng)

- Western Storm won the toss and elected to field.

=== Final ===
21 August
15:00
Scorecard

Western Storm; 140/5 (20 overs)	v	Southern Vipers; 143/3 (18.5 overs)
Rachel Priest 57 (55); Arran Brindle 2/15 (4 overs)		Suzie Bates 52 (46); Jodie Dibble 1/27 (4 overs)

Southern Vipers won by 7 wickets
County Cricket Ground, Chelmsford
Umpires: Russell Warren (Eng) and Chris Watts (Eng)

- Southern Vipers won the toss and elected to field.

== Statistics ==
=== Batting ===
Player	Matches	Innings	NO	Runs	HS	Average	Strike rate	100s	50s	4s	6s
Freya Davies	7	–	–	–	–	–	–	–	–	–	–
Jodie Dibble	7	–	–	–	–	–	–	–	–	–	–
Georgia Hennessy	7	7	4	45	20*	45.00	112.50	0	0	7	0
Heather Knight	7	7	0	199	74	28.42	119.16	0	2	23	1
Lizelle Lee	7	6	0	67	53	11.16	111.66	0	1	9	2
Sophie Luff	7	6	4	36	21*	18.00	116.12	0	0	4	0
Caitlin O'Keefe	7	–	–	–	–	–	–	–	–	–	–
Rachel Priest	7	7	0	133	57	19.00	98.51	0	2	17	3
Anya Shrubsole	7	1	1	1	1*	–	25.00	0	0	0	0
Stafanie Taylor	7	7	2	289	78*	57.80	118.44	0	2	28	9
Fran Wilson	7	7	3	102	24*	25.50	106.25	0	0	10	1
Source: ESPN Cricinfo

=== Bowling ===
Player	Matches	Innings	Overs	Maidens	Runs	Wickets	BBI	Average	Economy	Strike rate
Freya Davies	7	7	23.5	1	176	5	2/38	35.20	7.38	28.6
Jodie Dibble	7	7	17.0	0	120	3	1/9	40.00	7.05	34.0
Georgia Hennessy	7	7	18.3	0	133	3	1/10	44.33	7.18	37.0
Heather Knight	7	7	26.0	0	153	7	3/11	21.85	5.88	22.2
Anya Shrubsole	7	7	26.0	2	146	9	5/23	16.22	5.61	17.3
Stafanie Taylor	7	7	26.0	0	177	11	4/14	16.09	6.80	14.1
Source: ESPN Cricinfo

=== Fielding ===
Player	Matches	Innings	Catches
Freya Davies	7	7	2
Jodie Dibble	7	7	1
Georgia Hennessy	7	7	0
Heather Knight	7	7	1
Lizelle Lee	7	7	4
Sophie Luff	7	7	1
Caitlin O'Keefe	7	7	2
Anya Shrubsole	7	7	3
Stafanie Taylor	7	7	0
Fran Wilson	7	7	1
Source: ESPN Cricinfo

=== Wicket-keeping ===
Player	Matches	Innings	Catches	Stumpings
Rachel Priest	7	7	2	4
Source: ESPN Cricinfo
