= 2018 Lancashire Thunder season =

Lancashire Thunder
2018 season
- Coach: Alex Blackwell
- Captain: Danielle Hazell
- Overseas player: Nicole Bolton; Harmanpreet Kaur; Amy Satterthwaite
- WCSL: Group Stage, 4th
- Most runs: Amy Satterthwaite (277)
- Most wickets: Sophie Ecclestone (15)
- Most catches: Kate Cross (6); Amy Satterthwaite (6)
- Most wicket-keeping dismissals: Eleanor Threlkeld (9)

The 2018 season was Lancashire Thunder's third season, in which they competed in the Women's Cricket Super League, a Twenty20 competition. The side finished fourth in the group stage, their best ever finish, winning five of their ten matches.

The side was captained by Danielle Hazell and coached by Alex Blackwell. They played two home matches at Old Trafford, and one apiece at Stanley Park, Aigburth Cricket Ground and the Trafalgar Road Ground.

== Squad ==
Lancashire Thunder's 15-player squad is listed below. Age given is at the start of Lancashire Thunder's first match of the season (22 July 2018).

Name	Nationality	Birth date	Batting style	Bowling style	Notes
Batters
Nicole Bolton	Australia	17 January 1989 (aged 29)	Left-handed	Right-arm off break	Overseas player
Georgie Boyce	England	4 October 1998 (aged 19)	Right-handed	Right-arm medium	
Evelyn Jones	England	8 August 1992 (aged 25)	Left-handed	Left-arm medium	
Natasha Miles	Hong Kong	19 October 1988 (aged 29)	Right-handed	Right-arm medium	
All-rounders
Natalie Brown	England	16 October 1990 (aged 27)	Right-handed	Right arm medium	
Harmanpreet Kaur	India	8 March 1989 (aged 29)	Right-handed	Right-arm off break	Overseas player
Emma Lamb	England	16 December 1997 (aged 20)	Right-handed	Right-arm off break	
Amy Satterthwaite	New Zealand	7 October 1986 (aged 31)	Left-handed	Right-arm medium	Overseas player
Wicket-keepers
Eleanor Threlkeld	England	16 November 1998 (aged 19)	Right-handed	—	
Bowlers
Kate Cross	England	3 October 1991 (aged 26)	Right-handed	Right-arm medium	
Rachel Dickinson	England	6 May 1998 (aged 20)	Right-handed	Right-arm medium	
Alice Dyson	England	28 January 1999 (aged 19)	Right-handed	Right-arm medium	
Sophie Ecclestone	England	6 May 1999 (aged 19)	Right-handed	Slow left-arm orthodox	
Alex Hartley	England	6 September 1993 (aged 24)	Right-handed	Slow left-arm orthodox	
Danielle Hazell	England	13 May 1988 (aged 30)	Right-handed	Right-arm off break	Captain

== Women's Cricket Super League ==
=== Season standings ===
Pos	Team	Pld	W	L	T	NR	BP	Pts	NRR
1	Loughborough Lightning	10	7	3	0	0	5	33	1.361
2	Western Storm	10	6	3	0	1	4	30	0.919
3	Surrey Stars	10	5	4	0	1	2	24	−0.404
4	Lancashire Thunder	10	5	5	0	0	1	21	−0.825
5	Yorkshire Diamonds	10	3	6	0	1	1	15	−0.290
6	Southern Vipers	10	2	7	0	1	0	10	−0.490

Source: ESPN Cricinfo

Advanced to the Final.
Advanced to the Semi-final.

=== League stage ===
22 July 2018
14:30
Scorecard

Lancashire Thunder; 72 (16.5 overs)	v	Loughborough Lightning; 74/4 (15.1 overs)
Evelyn Jones 19 (20); Jenny Gunn 3/10 (3 overs)		Georgia Adams 22 (19); Alex Hartley 2/12 (4 overs)

Loughborough Lightning won by 6 wickets
Trafalgar Road Ground, Southport
Umpires: Rob White and Ian Ramage

- Loughborough Lightning won the toss and elected to field.
- Points: Loughborough Lightning 5, Lancashire Thunder 0

27 July 2018
14:30
Scorecard

Lancashire Thunder; 134/4 (20 overs)	v	Yorkshire Diamonds; 101 (18.2 overs)
Amy Satterthwaite 57* (34); Alice Davidson-Richards 2/15 (3 overs)		Lauren Winfield 28 (23); Sophie Ecclestone 3/11 (3.2 overs)

Lancashire Thunder won by 33 runs
Headingley, Leeds
Umpires: Mike Burns and Rob Bailey
Player of the match: Eleanor Threlkeld (Lancashire Thunder)

- Yorkshire Diamonds won the toss and elected to field.
- Points: Lancashire Thunder 5, Yorkshire Diamonds 0

29 July 2018
14:30
Scorecard

Lancashire Thunder; 137/6 (20 overs)	v	Southern Vipers; 133/9 (20 overs)
Evelyn Jones 69 (65); Tash Farrant 3/24 (4 overs)		Suzie Bates 40 (36); Emma Lamb 4/17 (4 overs)

Lancashire Thunder won by 4 runs
Aigburth Cricket Ground, Liverpool
Umpires: Sue Redfern and James Middlebrook

- Southern Vipers won the toss and elected to field.
- Points: Lancashire Thunder 4, Southern Vipers 0

31 July 2018
14:30
Scorecard

Surrey Stars; 148/5 (20 overs)	v	Lancashire Thunder; 151/5 (19.5 overs)
Nat Sciver 95 (57); Emma Lamb 3/34 (4 overs)		Nicole Bolton 87 (61); Natalie Sciver 2/26 (4 overs)

Lancashire Thunder won by 5 wickets
The Oval, London
Umpires: Graham Lloyd and Nick Cook

- Lancashire Thunder won the toss and elected to field.
- Points: Lancashire Thunder 4, Surrey Stars 0

3 August 2018
14:30
Scorecard

Lancashire Thunder; 153/7 (20 overs)	v	Western Storm; 154/3 (18.2 overs)
Amy Satterthwaite 85* (57); Anya Shrubsole 2/36 (4 overs)		Smriti Mandhana 102 (61); Amy Satterthwaite 1/7 (1.2 overs)

Western Storm won by 7 wickets
Old Trafford, Manchester
Umpires: Paul Baldwin and Sue Redfern

- Western Storm won the toss and elected to field.
- Points: Western Storm 4, Lancashire Thunder 0

7 August 2018
14:30
Scorecard

Surrey Stars; 167/8 (20 overs)	v	Lancashire Thunder; 112 (19.2 overs)
Lizelle Lee 70 (37); Emma Lamb 2/12 (3 overs)		Evelyn Jones 40 (48); Dane van Niekerk 3/20 (4 overs)

Surrey Stars won by 55 runs
Old Trafford, Manchester
Umpires: Mike Burns and Jeff Evans
Player of the match: Lizelle Lee (Surrey Stars)

- Lancashire Thunder won the toss and elected to field.
- Points: Surrey Stars 5, Lancashire Thunder 0

9 August 2018
14:30
Scorecard

Western Storm; 185/4 (20 overs)	v	Lancashire Thunder; 109 (18.2 overs)
Heather Knight 76 (50); Sophie Ecclestone 2/27 (4 overs)		Eleanor Threlkeld 33 (32); Claire Nicholas 3/11 (3 overs)

Western Storm won by 76 runs
County Ground, Taunton
Umpires: Billy Taylor and Sue Redfern

- Lancashire Thunder won the toss and elected to field.
- Points: Western Storm 5, Lancashire Thunder 0

11 August 2018
14:30
Scorecard

Lancashire Thunder; 136/7 (20 overs)	v	Loughborough Lightning; 137/1 (14.3 overs)
Amy Satterthwaite 47 (41); Sophie Devine 2/22 (4 overs)		Rachael Haynes 40* (37); Alex Hartley 0/16 (2 overs)

Loughborough Lightning won by 9 wickets
Haslegrave Ground, Loughborough
Umpires: Mark Newell and Ian Ramage

- Lancashire Thunder won the toss and elected to bat.
- Points: Loughborough Lightning 5, Lancashire Thunder 0

14 August 2018
14:30
Scorecard

Lancashire Thunder; 154/9 (20 overs)	v	Yorkshire Diamonds; 145/8 (20 overs)
Harmanpreet Kaur 74 (44); Katherine Brunt 3/22 (4 overs)		Katherine Brunt 44* (25); Alex Hartley 2/27 (4 overs)

Lancashire Thunder won by 9 runs
Stanley Park, Blackpool
Umpires: James Middlebrook and Rob White
Player of the match: Harmanpreet Kaur (Lancashire Thunder)

- Yorkshire Diamonds won the toss and elected to field.
- Points: Lancashire Thunder 4, Yorkshire Diamonds 0

18 August 2018
14:30
Scorecard

Lancashire Thunder; 162/3 (20 overs)	v	Southern Vipers; 153 (19.4 overs)
Harmanpreet Kaur 44* (20); Paige Scholfield 1/28 (4 overs)		Danielle Wyatt 36 (21); Sophie Ecclestone 4/20 (4 overs)

Lancashire Thunder won by 9 runs
Rose Bowl, Southampton
Umpires: Mark Newell and Chris Watts
Player of the match: Sophie Ecclestone (Lancashire Thunder)

- Lancashire Thunder won the toss and elected to field.
- Points: Lancashire Thunder 4, Southern Vipers 0

== Statistics ==
=== Batting ===
Player	Matches	Innings	NO	Runs	HS	Average	Strike rate	100s	50s	4s	6s
Nicole Bolton	10	10	0	274	87	27.40	119.65	0	1	40	0
Georgie Boyce	9	8	0	98	38	12.25	87.50	0	0	11	2
Natalie Brown	5	3	1	34	13	17.00	117.24	0	0	3	1
Kate Cross	10	4	2	17	13*	8.50	80.95	0	0	2	0
Sophie Ecclestone	10	7	2	3	2	0.60	23.07	0	0	0	0
Alex Hartley	10	4	2	0	0*	0.00	0.00	0	0	0	0
Danielle Hazell	10	7	1	34	12	5.66	89.47	0	0	4	0
Evelyn Jones	9	8	0	168	69	21.00	84.84	0	0	22	1
Harmanpreet Kaur	7	7	2	164	74	32.80	151.85	0	1	13	9
Emma Lamb	10	9	1	38	13	4.75	67.85	0	0	2	0
Amy Satterthwaite	10	10	2	277	85*	34.62	127.06	0	2	33	5
Eleanor Threlkeld	10	10	3	138	53*	19.71	99.28	0	1	14	1
Source: ESPN Cricinfo

=== Bowling ===
Player	Matches	Innings	Overs	Maidens	Runs	Wickets	BBI	Average	Economy	Strike rate
Natalie Brown	5	2	3.0	0	33	0	–	–	11.00	–
Kate Cross	10	10	36.0	1	266	7	1/4	38.00	7.38	30.8
Sophie Ecclestone	10	10	36.0	1	231	15	4/20	15.40	6.41	14.4
Alex Hartley	10	10	36.0	0	282	10	3/19	28.20	7.83	21.6
Danielle Hazell	10	10	34.0	1	237	6	2/29	39.50	6.97	34.0
Harmanpreet Kaur	7	1	2.0	0	15	0	–	–	7.50	–
Emma Lamb	10	10	29.0	1	234	11	4/17	21.27	8.06	15.8
Amy Satterthwaite	10	5	10.0	0	72	4	2/14	18.00	7.20	15.0
Source: ESPN Cricinfo

=== Fielding ===
Player	Matches	Innings	Catches
Nicole Bolton	10	10	3
Georgie Boyce	9	9	1
Natalie Brown	5	5	1
Kate Cross	10	10	6
Sophie Ecclestone	10	10	5
Alex Hartley	10	10	0
Danielle Hazell	10	10	2
Evelyn Jones	9	9	1
Harmanpreet Kaur	7	7	1
Emma Lamb	10	10	0
Amy Satterthwaite	10	10	6
Source: ESPN Cricinfo

=== Wicket-keeping ===
Player	Matches	Innings	Catches	Stumpings
Eleanor Threlkeld	10	10	1	8
Source: ESPN Cricinfo
