= List of Northern Diamonds cricketers =

This is an alphabetical list of cricketers who played for Northern Diamonds during their existence between 2020 and 2024. They first played in the Rachael Heyhoe Flint Trophy, a 50 over competition that began in 2020. In 2021, the Twenty20 Charlotte Edwards Cup was added to the women's domestic structure in England. At the end of the 2024 season, Northern Diamonds were effectively replaced by a professionalised Durham team.

Players' names are followed by the years in which they were active as a Northern Diamonds player. Seasons given are first and last seasons; the player did not necessarily play in all the intervening seasons. This list only includes players who appeared in at least one match for Northern Diamonds; players who were named in the team's squad for a season but did not play a match are not included.

== A ==
- Hollie Armitage (2020–2024)

== B ==
- Katherine Brunt (2020–2022)
- Erin Burns (2024)

== C ==
- Ami Campbell (2020–2021)

== D ==
- Leah Dobson (2021–2024)
- Rebecca Duckworth (2023–2024)

== F ==
- Helen Fenby (2020–2021)
- Katherine Fraser (2023–2024)

== G ==
- Abigail Glen (2022–2024)
- Phoebe Graham (2020–2021)
- Yvonne Graves (2022)
- Jenny Gunn (2020–2022)

== H ==
- Grace Hall (2023–2024)
- Bess Heath (2020–2024)
- Mariko Hill (2022)
- Rachel Hopkins (2020–2022)

== K ==
- Sterre Kalis (2020–2024)
- Leigh Kasperek (2022)

== L ==
- Beth Langston (2020–2024)
- Katie Levick (2020–2024)

== M ==
- Alex MacDonald (2020–2021)
- Emma Marlow (2022–2024)

== S ==
- Nat Sciver (2020–2022)
- Lizzie Scott (2022–2024)
- Rachel Slater (2021–2024)
- Linsey Smith (2020–2022)

== T ==
- Sarah Taylor (2021)
- Ella Telford (2021)
- Layla Tipton (2020)
- Chloe Tryon (2023)
- Phoebe Turner (2022–2024)
- Sophia Turner (2023–2024)

== W ==
- Maddie Ward (2024)
- Lauren Winfield-Hill (2020–2024)
- Jessica Woolston (2022–2024)

== Captains ==
No.	Name	Nationality	Years	First	Last	LA	T20	Total
1	Lauren Winfield-Hill	England	2020–2024	29 August 2020	14 September 2024	6	0	6
2	Hollie Armitage	England	2020–2024	5 September 2020	4 September 2024	46	31	77

== See also ==
- List of Yorkshire Diamonds cricketers
