= 2021 Northern Diamonds season =

Northern Diamonds
2021 season
- Coach: Danielle Hazell
- Captain: Hollie Armitage
- RHFT: Runners-up
- CEC: Runners-up
- Most runs: RHFT: Sterre Kalis (290); CEC: Hollie Armitage (141)
- Most wickets: RHFT: Beth Langston (13); CEC: Jenny Gunn (13)
- Most catches: RHFT: Ami Campbell (4); CEC: Linsey Smith (6)
- Most wicket-keeping dismissals: RHFT: Lauren Winfield-Hill (7); CEC: Sarah Taylor (4)

The 2021 season was Northern Diamonds' second season, in which they competed in the 50 over Rachael Heyhoe Flint Trophy and the new Twenty20 competition, the Charlotte Edwards Cup, finishing as runners-up in both competitions. The side finished second in the group stage of the Rachael Heyhoe Flint Trophy, therefore progressing to the play-off, where they beat Central Sparks by 6 wickets. In the final, they played Southern Vipers in a repeat of the previous year's final. Batting first, Diamonds made 183, but lost by 3 wickets after reducing Vipers to 109/7.

In the Charlotte Edwards Cup, the side topped Group B of the competition, winning four of their six matches. They then played Southern Vipers in the semi-final on Finals Day, beating them by 18 runs to progress to the final against South East Stars. Diamonds made 138/4 batting first in the final, but this was chased down by the Stars with 2 overs to spare.

The side was captained by Hollie Armitage and coached by Danielle Hazell. They played their home matches at four grounds across the North East: the Riverside Ground, Headingley, South Northumberland Cricket Club and the North Marine Road Ground.

== Squad ==
Northern Diamonds announced their initial 18-player squad on 26 May 2021. On 10 June 2021, Sarah Taylor was signed as a short-term replacement for the injured Bess Heath. Age given is at the start of Northern Diamonds' first match of the season (29 May 2021).

Name	Nationality	Birth date	Batting Style	Bowling Style	Notes
Batters
Ami Campbell	England	6 June 1991 (aged 29)	Left-handed	Right-arm medium	
Leah Dobson	England	6 October 2001 (aged 19)	Right-handed	Right arm medium	
Rachel Hopkins	England	19 July 1992 (aged 28)	Right-handed	Right-arm medium	
Sterre Kalis	Netherlands	30 August 1999 (aged 21)	Right-handed	Right-arm medium	
All-rounders
Hollie Armitage	England	14 June 1997 (aged 23)	Right-handed	Right-arm leg break	Captain
Katherine Brunt	England	2 July 1985 (aged 35)	Right-handed	Right-arm fast medium	
Jenny Gunn	England	9 May 1986 (aged 35)	Right-handed	Right-arm medium	
Alex MacDonald	England	3 October 1991 (aged 29)	Left-handed	Right-arm medium	
Nat Sciver	England	20 August 1992 (aged 28)	Right-handed	Right-arm medium	
Wicket-keepers
Bess Heath	England	20 August 2001 (aged 19)	Right-handed	—	
Sarah Taylor	England	20 May 1989 (aged 32)	Right-handed	–	Injury replacement player
Lauren Winfield-Hill	England	16 August 1990 (aged 30)	Right-handed	Right-arm medium	
Bowlers
Helen Fenby	England	23 November 1998 (aged 22)	Right-handed	Right-arm leg break	
Phoebe Graham	England	23 October 1991 (aged 29)	Right-handed	Right-arm medium	
Beth Langston	England	6 September 1992 (aged 28)	Right-handed	Right-arm medium	
Katie Levick	England	17 July 1991 (aged 29)	Right-handed	Right-arm leg break	
Rachel Slater	England	20 November 2001 (aged 19)	Right-handed	Left-arm medium	
Linsey Smith	England	10 March 1995 (aged 26)	Left-handed	Slow left-arm orthodox	
Ella Telford	England	5 April 1999 (aged 22)	Right-handed	Right-arm medium	

== Rachael Heyhoe Flint Trophy ==
=== Season standings ===
Pos	Team	Pld	W	L	T	NR	BP	Pts	NRR
1	Southern Vipers (Q)	7	6	1	0	0	3	27	0.417
2	Northern Diamonds (Q)	7	5	2	0	0	3	23	1.182
3	Central Sparks (Q)	7	5	2	0	0	2	22	0.822
4	Lightning	7	3	4	0	0	1	13	0.274
5	South East Stars	7	3	4	0	0	1	13	−0.226
6	Western Storm	7	3	4	0	0	1	13	−0.462
7	North West Thunder	7	3	4	0	0	1	13	−0.620
8	Sunrisers	7	0	7	0	0	0	0	−1.598

Source: ESPN Cricinfo

Advanced to the final
Advanced to the play-off

=== Fixtures ===
29 May 2021
10:30 BST
Scorecard

Northern Diamonds; 279 (49.2 overs)	v	Central Sparks; 283/8 (48.2 overs)
Lauren Winfield-Hill 110 (126); Issy Wong 5/49 (10 overs)		Amy Jones 114 (114); Linsey Smith 3/54 (9 overs)

Central Sparks won by 2 wickets
Headingley, Leeds
Umpires: Hassan Adnan and Jasmine Naeem

- Central Sparks won the toss and elected to field.
- Points: Central Sparks 4, Northern Diamonds 0

31 May 2021
10:30 BST
Scorecard

Northern Diamonds; 151 (45.5 overs)	v	Lightning; 145 (48.1 overs)
Jenny Gunn 40 (77); Kathryn Bryce 4/16 (8 overs)		Tammy Beaumont 21 (34); Katherine Brunt 4/23 (10 overs)

Northern Diamonds won by 6 runs
Kibworth Cricket Club New Ground, Kibworth
Umpires: Joanne Ibbotson and Mark Newell

- Lightning won the toss and elected to field.
- Points: Northern Diamonds 4, Lightning 0

5 June 2021
10:30 BST
Scorecard

Sunrisers; 53 (29.1 overs)	v	Northern Diamonds; 54/1 (7.4 overs)
Amara Carr 17 (43); Jenny Gunn 3/10 (6 overs)		Hollie Armitage 14* (19); Kate Coppack 1/14 (3 overs)

Northern Diamonds won by 9 wickets
Fenner's, Cambridge
Umpires: Joanne Ibbotson and Sarah Bartlett

- Northern Diamonds won the toss and elected to field.
- Points: Northern Diamonds 5, Sunrisers 0

12 June 2021
10:30 BST
Scorecard

South East Stars; 250/6 (50 overs)	v	Northern Diamonds; 254/7 (49.2 overs)
Kirstie White 73 (90); Jenny Gunn 2/45 (9 overs)		Sterre Kalis 76 (106); Danielle Gregory 2/31 (10 overs)

Northern Diamonds won by 3 wickets
Headingley, Leeds
Umpires: Jasmine Naeem and Tom Lungley

- South East Stars won the toss and elected to bat.
- Points: Northern Diamonds 4, South East Stars 0

10 September 2021
10:30 BST
Scorecard

Western Storm; 183 (38.1 overs)	v	Northern Diamonds; 184/3 (31.1 overs)
Sophie Luff 65 (77); Linsey Smith 5/34 (9.1 overs)		Hollie Armitage 68* (69); Steph Hutchins 2/27 (5 overs)

Northern Diamonds won by 7 wickets
Riverside Ground, Chester-le-Street
Umpires: James Middlebrook and Lina Nenova

- Northern Diamonds won the toss and elected to field.
- Points: Northern Diamonds 5, Western Storm 0

12 September 2021
10:30 BST
Scorecard

Northern Diamonds; 294/6 (50 overs)	v	North West Thunder; 189/8 (50 overs)
Bess Heath 78* (65); Alex Hartley 2/57 (10 overs)		Georgie Boyce 67 (100); Katie Levick 4/34 (10 overs)

Northern Diamonds won by 105 runs
Riverside Ground, Chester-le-Street
Umpires: Hassan Adnan and Joanne Ibbotson

- North West Thunder won the toss and elected to field.
- Points: Northern Diamonds 5, North West Thunder 0

18 September 2021
10:30 BST
Scorecard

Northern Diamonds; 256 (48.3 overs)	v	Southern Vipers; 260/5 (48.5 overs)
Bess Heath 71 (51); Lauren Bell 2/29 (10 overs)		Georgia Elwiss 84* (77); Phoebe Graham 3/44 (10 overs)

Southern Vipers won by 5 wickets
Rose Bowl, Southampton
Umpires: Sophie McLelland and Ian Ramage

- Northern Diamonds won the toss and elected to bat.
- Points: Southern Vipers 4, Northern Diamonds 0

==== Play-off ====
22 September 2021
10:30 BST
Scorecard

Central Sparks; 175/7 (50 overs)	v	Northern Diamonds; 176/4 (32.5 overs)
Ria Fackrell 42* (80); Linsey Smith 2/25 (10 overs)		Ami Campbell 76 (78); Emily Arlott 2/35 (9 overs)

Northern Diamonds won by 6 wickets
North Marine Road Ground, Scarborough
Umpires: Sarah Bartlett and Rob White

- Central Sparks won the toss and elected to bat.

==== Final ====
25 September 2021
10:30 BST
Scorecard

Northern Diamonds; 183 (49.2 overs)	v	Southern Vipers; 187/7 (49.4 overs)
Ami Campbell 60 (73); Georgia Adams 4/35 (10 overs)		Emily Windsor 47* (97); Jenny Gunn 3/31 (10 overs)

Southern Vipers won by 3 wickets
County Ground, Northampton
Umpires: Jasmine Naeem and Neil Pratt
Player of the match: Emily Windsor (Southern Vipers)

- Northern Diamonds won the toss and elected to bat.

=== Tournament statistics ===
==== Batting ====
Player	Matches	Innings	Runs	Average	High score	100s	50s
Sterre Kalis	9	8	290	41.42	76	0	2
Ami Campbell	8	7	223	31.85	76	0	2
Bess Heath	5	5	212	106.00	78*	0	2
Hollie Armitage	9	9	197	28.14	68*	0	1
Beth Langston	9	6	141	35.25	59	0	2
Lauren Winfield-Hill	4	4	135	33.75	110	1	0
Jenny Gunn	6	4	109	27.75	50	0	1

Source: ESPN Cricinfo Qualification: 100 runs.

==== Bowling ====
Player	Matches	Overs	Wickets	Average	Economy	BBI	5wi
Beth Langston	9	73.5	13	20.69	3.64	2/12	0
Katie Levick	8	59.1	12	15.83	3.21	4/34	0
Linsey Smith	8	73.0	12	23.83	3.91	5/34	1
Katherine Brunt	3	27.0	9	8.33	2.77	4/23	0
Jenny Gunn	6	45.0	9	18.44	3.68	3/10	0
Phoebe Graham	6	49.0	6	41.66	5.10	3/44	0

Source: ESPN Cricinfo Qualification: 5 wickets.

== Charlotte Edwards Cup ==
=== Group B ===
Pos	Team	Pld	W	L	T	NR	BP	Pts	NRR
1	Northern Diamonds (Q)	6	4	2	0	0	1	17	0.655
2	Western Storm	6	4	2	0	0	1	17	0.182
3	North West Thunder	6	2	3	1	0	1	11	0.029
4	Sunrisers	6	1	4	1	0	0	6	−0.871

Source: ESPN Cricinfo
- Advanced to the semi-final

=== Fixtures ===
26 June 2021
14:30 BST
Scorecard

North West Thunder; 118/6 (20 overs)	v	Northern Diamonds; 106/9 (20 overs)
Emma Lamb 58 (43); Beth Langston 2/32 (4 overs)		Sterre Kalis 32 (37); Emma Lamb 4/13 (4 overs)

North West Thunder won by 12 runs
Headingley, Leeds
Umpires: James Middlebrook and Lina Nenova

- North West Thunder won the toss and elected to bat.
- Points: North West Thunder 4, Northern Diamonds 0

2 July 2021
19:00 BST (D/N)
Scorecard

Sunrisers; 116/7 (20 overs)	v	Northern Diamonds; 117/2 (16.2 overs)
Jo Gardner 42 (30); Jenny Gunn 3/25 (4 overs)		Leah Dobson 44* (52); Mady Villiers 1/22 (3 overs)

Northern Diamonds won by 8 wickets
County Ground, Chelmsford
Umpires: Joanne Ibbotson and Sophie McLelland

- Northern Diamonds won the toss and elected to field.
- Points: Northern Diamonds 4, Sunrisers 0

10 July 2021
14:30 BST
Scorecard

Western Storm; 106/9 (20 overs)	v	Northern Diamonds; 110/9 (20 overs)
Katie George 21 (23); Alex MacDonald 4/17 (4 overs)		Jenny Gunn 27* (21); Danielle Gibson 2/9 (4 overs)

Northern Diamonds won by 1 wicket
County Ground, Taunton
Umpires: Anna Harris and Chris Watts

- Northern Diamonds won the toss and elected to field.
- Points: Northern Diamonds 4, Western Storm 0

25 August 2021
14:30 BST
Scorecard

Northern Diamonds; 120/6 (20 overs)	v	Sunrisers; 101/7 (20 overs)
Beth Langston 40 (35); Kate Coppack 2/10 (4 overs)		Jo Gardner 31 (29); Alex MacDonald 2/11 (4 overs)

Northern Diamonds won by 19 runs
South Northumberland Cricket Club, Gosforth
Umpires: Paul Pollard and Jane Pratt

- Sunrisers won the toss and elected to field.
- Points: Northern Diamonds 4, Sunrisers 0

28 August 2021
14:30 BST
Scorecard

Northern Diamonds; 110/9 (20 overs)	v	Western Storm; 111/6 (19.3 overs)
Alex MacDonald 22 (20); Nicole Harvey 2/20 (4 overs)		Sophie Luff 60* (54); Rachel Slater 2/16 (3 overs)

Western Storm won by 4 wickets
Riverside Ground, Chester-le-Street
Umpires: Jasmine Naeem and Neil Pratt

- Western Storm won the toss and elected to field.
- Points: Western Storm 4, Northern Diamonds 0

30 August 2021
14:30 BST
Scorecard

North West Thunder; 90/9 (20 overs)	v	Northern Diamonds; 92/2 (12.2 overs)
Danielle Collins 16 (25); Jenny Gunn 4/15 (4 overs)		Bess Heath 58* (40); Alice Dyson 1/9 (1 over)

Northern Diamonds won by 8 wickets
Chester Boughton Hall Cricket Club, Chester
Umpires: Jasmine Naeem and Billy Taylor

- Northern Diamonds won the toss and elected to field.
- Points: Northern Diamonds 5, North West Thunder 0

==== Semi-final ====
5 September 2021
12:00 BST
Scorecard

Northern Diamonds; 135/6 (20 overs)	v	Southern Vipers; 117 (20 overs)
Lauren Winfield-Hill 65 (49); Lauren Bell 1/15 (4 overs)		Emily Windsor 32 (36); Jenny Gunn 4/26 (4 overs)

Northern Diamonds won by 18 runs
Rose Bowl, Southampton
Umpires: Anna Harris and Sue Redfern
Player of the match: Lauren Winfield-Hill (Northern Diamonds)

- Northern Diamonds won the toss and elected to bat.

==== Final ====
5 September 2021
16:00 BST
Scorecard

Northern Diamonds; 138/4 (20 overs)	v	South East Stars; 139/5 (18 overs)
Hollie Armitage 59* (48); Grace Gibbs 1/13 (2 overs)		Alice Capsey 40* (26); Katie Levick 2/19 (4 overs)

South East Stars won by 5 wickets
Rose Bowl, Southampton
Umpires: Sarah Bartlett and Sue Redfern
Player of the match: Alice Capsey (South East Stars)

- Northern Diamonds won the toss and elected to bat.

=== Tournament statistics ===
==== Batting ====
Player	Matches	Innings	Runs	Average	High score	100s	50s
Hollie Armitage	8	8	141	23.50	59*	0	1
Leah Dobson	8	8	111	15.85	44*	0	0
Bess Heath	5	5	103	25.75	58*	0	1
Jenny Gunn	8	6	97	32.33	27*	0	0
Sterre Kalis	8	6	83	13.83	32	0	0
Lauren Winfield-Hill	3	3	70	23.33	65	0	1
Beth Langston	2	2	57	57.00	46*	0	0
Sarah Taylor	3	2	54	54.00	43*	0	0

Source: ESPN Cricinfo Qualification: 50 runs.

==== Bowling ====
Player	Matches	Overs	Wickets	Average	Economy	BBI	5wi
Jenny Gunn	8	28.3	13	12.69	5.78	4/15	0
Katie Levick	8	30.0	10	15.30	5.10	2/19	0
Linsey Smith	8	32.0	10	15.60	4.87	2/12	0
Alex MacDonald	7	26.0	9	14.11	4.88	4/17	0
Rachel Slater	4	13.0	5	14.00	5.83	2/16	0

Source: ESPN Cricinfo Qualification: 5 wickets.

== Season statistics ==
=== Batting ===
Player	Rachael Heyhoe Flint Trophy								Charlotte Edwards Cup							
Player	Matches	Innings	Runs	High score	Average	Strike rate	100s	50s	Matches	Innings	Runs	High score	Average	Strike rate	100s	50s
Hollie Armitage	9	9	197	68*	28.14	76.65	0	1	8	8	141	59*	23.50	109.30	0	1
Katherine Brunt	3	2	44	43	22.00	73.33	0	0	–	–	–	–	–	–	–	–
Ami Campbell	8	7	223	76	31.85	87.10	0	2	3	3	20	15	6.66	95.23	0	0
Leah Dobson	5	5	74	49	14.80	59.20	0	0	8	8	111	44*	15.85	79.28	0	0
Helen Fenby	1	1	2	2*	–	15.38	0	0	1	1	0	0	0.00	0.00	0	0
Phoebe Graham	6	2	1	1	0.50	20.00	0	0	4	2	6	6*	6.00	150.00	0	0
Jenny Gunn	6	4	109	50	27.25	64.11	0	1	8	6	97	27*	32.33	96.03	0	0
Bess Heath	5	5	212	78*	106.00	111.57	0	2	5	5	103	58*	25.75	105.10	0	1
Rachel Hopkins	4	4	43	20	10.75	47.77	0	0	8	4	10	4*	3.33	58.82	0	0
Sterre Kalis	9	8	290	76	41.42	66.66	0	2	8	6	83	32	13.83	70.33	0	0
Beth Langston	9	6	141	59*	35.25	130.55	0	2	2	2	57	46*	57.00	105.55	0	0
Katie Levick	8	3	11	8	3.66	40.74	0	0	8	3	15	7*	–	187.50	0	0
Alex MacDonald	4	3	57	39	19.00	62.63	0	0	7	3	28	22	14.00	87.50	0	0
Nat Sciver	3	3	26	10	13.00	57.77	0	0	–	–	–	–	–	–	–	–
Rachel Slater	3	2	6	6*	6.00	20.68	0	0	4	1	5	5	5.00	166.66	0	0
Linsey Smith	8	5	82	37	27.33	68.90	0	0	8	5	45	30	9.00	78.94	0	0
Sarah Taylor	1	1	2	2	2.00	40.00	0	0	3	2	54	43*	54.00	108.00	0	0
Ella Telford	3	1	0	0*	–	–	0	0	1	1	1	1*	–	33.33	0	0
Lauren Winfield-Hill	4	4	135	110	33.75	82.31	1	0	3	3	70	65	23.33	120.68	0	1
Source: ESPN Cricinfo

=== Bowling ===
Player	Rachael Heyhoe Flint Trophy							Charlotte Edwards Cup						
Player	Matches	Overs	Wickets	Average	Economy	BBI	5wi	Matches	Overs	Wickets	Average	Economy	BBI	5wi
Hollie Armitage	9	23.0	2	62.50	5.43	2/32	0	8	9.0	3	23.66	7.88	2/18	0
Katherine Brunt	3	27.0	9	8.33	2.77	4/23	0	–	–	–	–	–	–	–
Helen Fenby	1	–	–	–	–	–	–	1	1.0	0	–	7.00	–	0
Phoebe Graham	6	49.0	6	41.66	5.10	3/44	0	4	13.0	4	19.75	6.07	2/20	0
Jenny Gunn	6	45.0	9	18.44	3.68	3/10	0	8	28.3	13	12.69	5.78	4/15	0
Beth Langston	9	73.5	13	20.69	3.64	2/12	0	2	6.0	4	12.75	8.50	2/19	0
Katie Levick	8	59.1	12	15.83	3.21	4/34	0	8	30.0	10	15.30	5.10	2/19	0
Alex MacDonald	4	3.0	0	–	7.00	–	0	7	26.0	9	14.11	4.88	4/17	0
Nat Sciver	3	23.2	2	50.50	4.32	2/24	0	–	–	–	–	–	–	–
Rachel Slater	3	22.0	2	50.00	4.54	2/39	0	4	12.0	5	14.00	5.83	2/16	0
Linsey Smith	8	73.0	12	23.83	3.91	5/34	1	8	32.0	10	15.60	4.87	2/12	0
Ella Telford	3	14.0	0	–	7.00	–	0	–	–	–	–	–	–	–
Source: ESPN Cricinfo

=== Fielding ===
Player	Rachael Heyhoe Flint Trophy			Charlotte Edwards Cup		
Player	Matches	Innings	Catches	Matches	Innings	Catches
Hollie Armitage	9	9	3	8	8	4
Katherine Brunt	3	3	2	–	–	–
Ami Campbell	8	8	4	3	3	2
Leah Dobson	5	5	0	8	8	2
Helen Fenby	1	1	0	1	1	1
Phoebe Graham	6	6	0	4	4	3
Jenny Gunn	6	6	2	8	8	3
Rachel Hopkins	4	4	0	8	8	0
Sterre Kalis	9	9	2	8	8	2
Beth Langston	9	9	2	2	2	0
Katie Levick	8	8	0	8	8	0
Alex MacDonald	4	4	1	7	7	2
Nat Sciver	3	3	2	–	–	–
Rachel Slater	3	3	0	4	4	1
Linsey Smith	8	8	1	8	8	6
Ella Telford	3	3	1	1	1	0
Lauren Winfield-Hill	4	1	0	3	3	2
Source: ESPN Cricinfo

=== Wicket-keeping ===
Player	Rachael Heyhoe Flint Trophy				Charlotte Edwards Cup			
Player	Matches	Innings	Catches	Stumpings	Matches	Innings	Catches	Stumpings
Bess Heath	5	5	4	1	5	5	1	2
Sarah Taylor	1	1	0	0	3	3	3	1
Lauren Winfield-Hill	4	3	6	1	–	–	–	–
Source: ESPN Cricinfo
