= Madeline Walsh =

English cricketer

Personal information
- Full name: Madeline Rose Walsh
- Born: 25 March 1997 (age 29)
- Batting: Right-handed
- Bowling: Right-arm medium
- Role: Bowler

Domestic team information
- Years: Team
- 2015–2018: Yorkshire
- 2017: Yorkshire Diamonds

Career statistics
Competition	WLA	WT20
Matches	15	28
Runs scored	119	186
Batting average	13.22	8.08
100s/50s	0/0	0/0
Top score	29	38
Balls bowled	147	274
Wickets	6	17
Bowling average	17.50	16.41
5 wickets in innings	0	0
10 wickets in match	0	0
Best bowling	3/9	4/18
Catches/stumpings	3/–	1/–
- Source: CricketArchive, 25 March 2021

Madeline Rose Walsh (born 25 March 1997) is an English cricketer who last played for Yorkshire in 2018. She also played for Yorkshire Diamonds in the 2017 Women's Cricket Super League. She plays as a right-arm medium bowler.

== Early life ==
Walsh studied sports sciences at Huddersfield New College. She is from Golcar, West Yorkshire.

== Domestic career ==
Walsh made her county debut in 2015, for Yorkshire against Kent. Yorkshire won the County Championship in her first season with the club, and finished 2nd in the Twenty20 Cup: Walsh was the side's leading wicket-taker in this competition, with 9 wickets at an average of 13.66. Walsh continued playing for Yorkshire until the end of the 2018 season, with her best year coming in 2017, when she took 5 wickets in both the County Championship and the Twenty20 Cup.

Walsh also played for Yorkshire Diamonds in the 2017 Women's Cricket Super League. She appeared in four matches for the side, but made little impact.
