= Rachel Dickinson =

English cricketer

Personal information
- Full name: Rachel Angela Dickinson
- Born: 6 May 1998 (age 28); Lancashire, England
- Batting: Right-handed
- Bowling: Right-arm medium
- Role: Bowler

Domestic team information
- Years: Team
- 2012–2018: Lancashire
- 2017–2018: Lancashire Thunder

Career statistics
Competition	WLA	WT20
Matches	19	27
Runs scored	36	65
Batting average	9.83	6.50
100s/50s	0/0	0/0
Top score	36	13*
Balls bowled	282	230
Wickets	9	13
Bowling average	22.77	17.46
5 wickets in innings	1	0
10 wickets in match	0	0
Best bowling	5/22	3/6
Catches/stumpings	3/–	4/–
- Source: CricketArchive, 28 March 2021

Rachel Angela Dickinson (born 6 May 1998) is an English cricketer who last played for Lancashire in 2018. She plays as a right-arm medium bowler. She also played for Lancashire Thunder in the Women's Cricket Super League.

== Domestic career ==
Dickinson made her county debut in 2012, for Lancashire against Staffordshire. In 2015, she helped her side to promotion in the Twenty20 Cup, taking 5 wickets at an average of 9.20. Two seasons later, Lancashire won the double of the 2017 Women's County Championship and 2017 Women's Twenty20 Cup, with Dickinson taking 9 wickets in the Championship and 8 wickets in the Twenty20 Cup. She also achieved her List A best bowling figures that season, taking 5/22 against Kent.

Dickinson was also part of the Lancashire Thunder squad in the Women's Cricket Super League in 2017 and 2018. She appeared in one match for the side, in 2017 against Yorkshire Diamonds, but did not bat or bowl.
