= Caitlin O'Keefe =

English cricketer

Cait O'Keefe
Personal information
- Full name: Caitlin O'Keefe
- Born: 16 December 1996 (age 29); Plymouth, Devon, England
- Batting: Right-handed
- Bowling: Right-arm medium
- Role: All-rounder

Domestic team information
- Years: Team
- 2010–2018: Devon
- 2016: Western Storm
- 2021: Devon

Career statistics
Competition	WLA	WT20
Matches	54	45
Runs scored	710	426
Batting average	20.88	17.75
100s/50s	0/2	0/1
Top score	66*	60*
Balls bowled	1,267	324
Wickets	42	14
Bowling average	23.33	20.71
5 wickets in innings	1	0
10 wickets in match	0	0
Best bowling	5/37	3/10
Catches/stumpings	10/–	19/–
- Source: CricketArchive, 2 October 2021

Caitlin O'Keefe (born 16 December 1996) is an English cricketer who plays as an all-rounder, batting right-handed bowling and right-arm off break. She played for Devon between 2010 and 2018 and in 2021, and played for Western Storm in the 2016 Women's Cricket Super League.

== Early life ==
O'Keefe was born on 16 December 1996 in Plymouth, Devon.

== Domestic career ==
O'Keefe made her county debut for Devon in 2010, against Scotland. She was part of the Devon squad that won promotions in the 2011 Women's County Championship and 2018 Women's Twenty20 Cup. She took her maiden five-wicket haul in 2012, taking 5/37 against Lancashire, and achieved her List A high score in 2017, scoring 66* against Worcestershire.

O'Keefe also played for Western Storm in the 2016 Women's Cricket Super League. She appeared in all 7 matches the side played as they reached the Final, but did not bat or bowl.

In 2021, O'Keefe returned to play for Devon in the Twenty20 Cup, and scored 36 off 29 balls in the first match of the season. Overall, she scored 83 runs in six matches for the side, and took 5 wickets.
