= Anna Nicholls =

English cricketer

Personal information
- Full name: Anna Louise Nicholls
- Born: 30 October 1997 (age 29); Barnet, Greater London, England
- Batting: Right-handed
- Bowling: Right-arm medium
- Role: Wicket-keeper

Domestic team information
- Years: Team
- 2011: Buckinghamshire
- 2012–2016: Middlesex
- 2016–2017: Yorkshire Diamonds
- 2017–2018: Yorkshire

Career statistics
Competition	WLA	WT20
Matches	45	37
Runs scored	433	222
Batting average	13.12	8.88
100s/50s	0/1	0/0
Top score	50	44
Balls bowled	440	72
Wickets	9	1
Bowling average	40.44	54.00
5 wickets in innings	0	0
10 wickets in match	0	0
Best bowling	3/38	1/15
Catches/stumpings	18/3	5/8
- Source: CricketArchive, 26 March 2021

Anna Louise Nicholls (born 30 October 1997) is an English cricketer who last played for Yorkshire in 2018. She plays as a wicket-keeper and right-handed batter. She previously played for Buckinghamshire and Middlesex, as well as Yorkshire Diamonds in the Women's Cricket Super League.

== Early life ==
Nicholls was born on 30 October 1997 in Barnet, Greater London.

== Domestic career ==
Nicholls made her county debut in 2011, for Buckinghamshire against Leicestershire. This was the only match she played for Buckinghamshire, as she moved to Middlesex ahead of the 2012 season. She played for Middlesex until 2016, with her best performance coming in the 2014 Women's County Championship, where she scored 80 runs, with a high score of 41. In 2017, Nicholls moved to Yorkshire, and hit her maiden county half-century that season in the County Championship. Altogether, she hit 140 runs in the competition, as well as taking five catches and making three stumpings. Nicholls played one more season for Yorkshire in 2018 but has not appeared since.

Nicholls also played for Yorkshire Diamonds in the Women's Cricket Super League in 2016 and 2017. Overall, she played 6 matches, scoring 11 runs and making 4 stumpings.
