= Paul Grayson (cricketer) =

English cricketer and coach

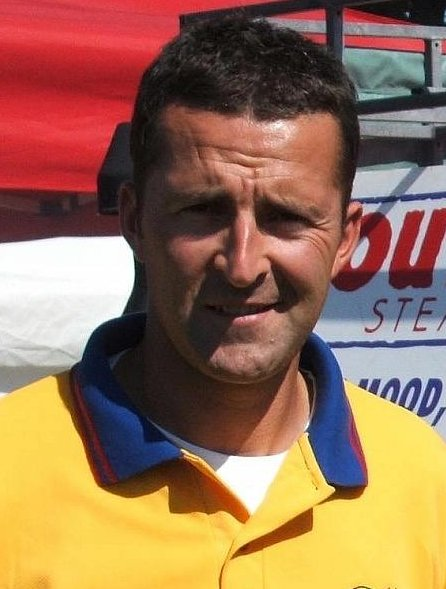

Personal information
- Full name: Adrian Paul Grayson
- Born: 31 March 1971 (age 55); Ripon, Yorkshire, England
- Nickname: Larry
- Height: 6 ft 1 in (1.85 m)
- Batting: Right-handed
- Bowling: Slow left-arm orthodox

International information
- National side: England
- ODI debut (cap 160): 10 October 2000 v South Africa
- Last ODI: 10 October 2001 v Zimbabwe

Domestic team information
- Years: Team
- 1990–1995: Yorkshire
- 1996–2004: Essex
- 2006–2007: Suffolk

Career statistics
Competition	ODI	FC	LA	T20
Matches	2	181	246	9
Runs scored	6	8,655	3,426	154
Batting average	3.00	31.70	20.39	30.80
100s/50s	0/0	16/43	–/11	0/1
Top score	6	189	82*	55
Balls bowled	90	12,748	8,477	126
Wickets	3	136	206	5
Bowling average	20.00	44.39	33.16	34.20
5 wickets in innings	0	1	0	0
10 wickets in match	0	0	0	0
Best bowling	3/40	5/20	4/25	2/36
Catches/stumpings	1/–	121/–	68/–	1/–
- Source: Cricinfo, 5 December 2021

Adrian Paul Grayson (born 31 March 1971) is an English former cricketer who played first-class cricket for Yorkshire and Essex.

Following his playing retirement he served as Essex's head coach from 2007 to 2015.

Grayson made his first-class debut for Yorkshire in 1990 where he played for five years. Having been released in 1995, he joined Essex and was awarded his county cap in his first season, 1996. Grayson played for England in one day internationals in 2000, at the ICC knock out Competition. He was out for a golden duck, and his five overs went for 20 runs. He played his second ODI a year later, having been chosen for the squad to tour Zimbabwe.

Grayson retired from first-class cricket at the end of the 2005 season, having scored 8,655 runs at 31.70, and taken 136 wickets at 44.39.

In July 2007, he became the head coach at Essex, having previously played for, and coached, their second XI. The Cricketers' Who's Who 2011 stated "Grayson is a progressive coach with sound, modern methods to dealing with today's players. Approachable, reasonable, and quietly authoritative, his coaching style leans on his experiences as a Yorkshire player, and latterly as a canny left-arm spinning all-rounder with the county he now coaches". He often talked on BBC Radio Essex during County Championship and CB40 games.

Grayson left Essex by mutual consent in August 2015.

On 30 September 2015 it was announced he would be joining Durham MCC University as their new coach.

On 3 February 2017, Grayson was appointed as coach of Yorkshire Diamonds, on a two-year contract. He later served as a Yorkshire Cricket batting coach between 22 January 2019 and 3 December 2021.

He is the brother of the former professional footballer and manager, Simon Grayson.

He now lives in North Yorkshire with his wife, where he works as a sports coach at Aysgarth School.

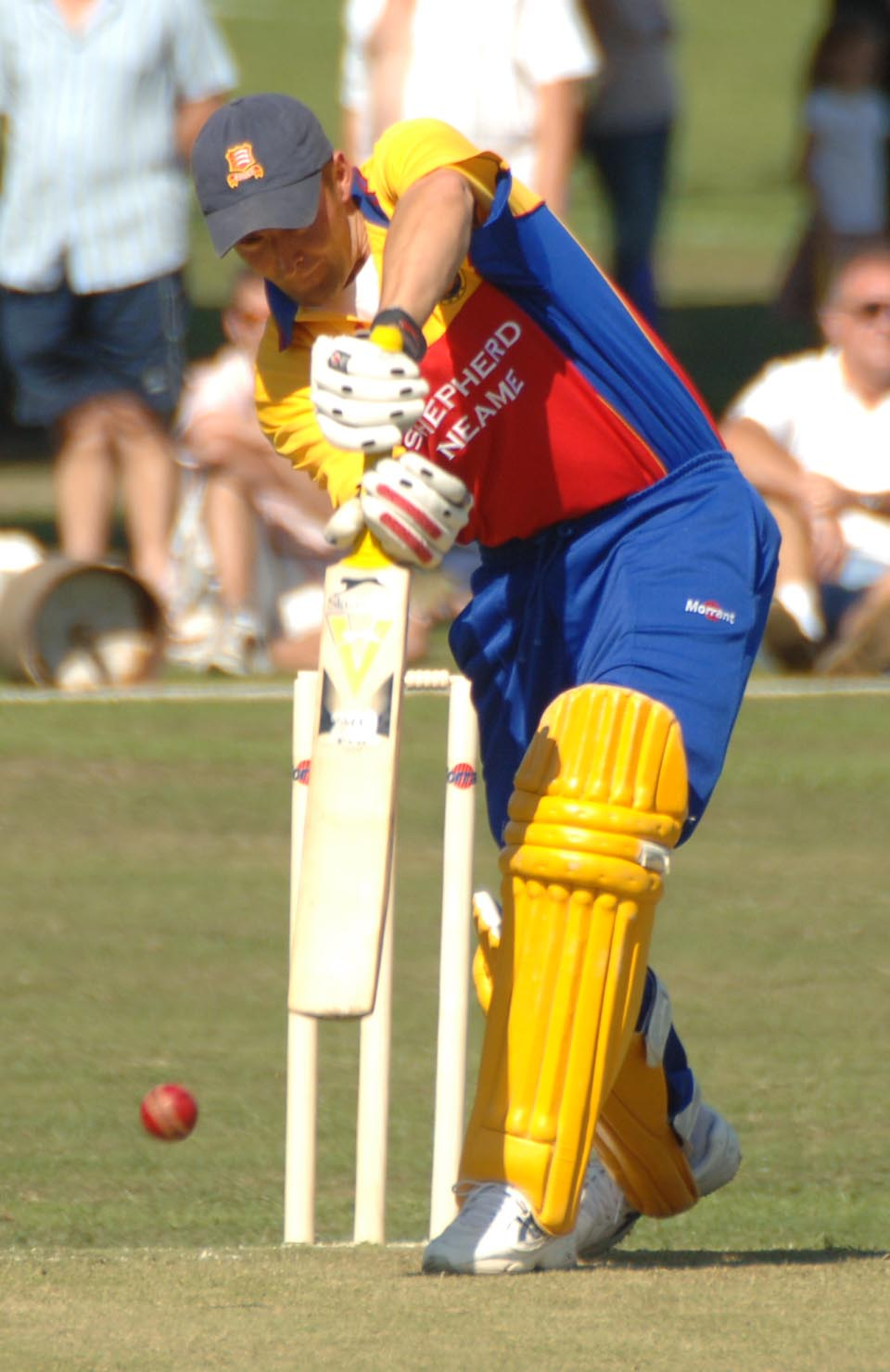
Grayson batting, August 2005
