= Ella Telford =

English cricketer

Personal information
- Full name: Ella Freya Telford
- Born: 5 April 1999 (age 27); Penrith, Cumbria, England
- Batting: Right-handed
- Bowling: Right-arm medium
- Role: Bowler

Domestic team information
- Years: Team
- 2010–2017: Cumbria
- 2017–2018: Lancashire
- 2017: Lancashire Thunder
- 2019–present: Yorkshire
- 2020–2021: Northern Diamonds

Career statistics
Competition	WLA	WT20
Matches	15	19
Runs scored	64	59
Batting average	16.00	9.83
100s/50s	0/0	0/0
Top score	25	14*
Balls bowled	438	231
Wickets	8	9
Bowling average	34.00	19.00
5 wickets in innings	0	0
10 wickets in match	0	0
Best bowling	2/14	2/7
Catches/stumpings	5/–	0/–
- Source: CricketArchive, 28 September 2021

Ella Freya Telford (born 5 April 1999) is an English cricketer who currently plays for Yorkshire. She plays primarily as a right-arm medium bowler. She has previously played for Cumbria, Lancashire and Northern Diamonds.

== Early life ==
Telford was born on 5 April 1999 in Penrith, Cumbria. Her sister, Elizabeth, has also played cricket for Cumbria. She studies at Leeds Beckett University, and has competed in heptathlon at national level.

== Domestic career ==
Telford made her county debut in 2010, aged 11, for Cumbria against Northumberland, but did not bat or bowl. She did not play for the side again until the 2014 season, when she appeared three times in the County Championship, taking 4 wickets at an average of 13.75. In 2016, Telford was Cumbria's joint-leading wicket-taker in the Twenty20 Cup, with 6 wickets at an average of 11.50.

In 2017, Telford played the majority of the season for Lancashire, as well as one match for Cumbria. That season, Lancashire won the double of the County Championship and the Twenty20 Cup. She was also in Lancashire Thunder's squad for the 2017 Women's Cricket Super League, but did not play a match. In 2018, Telford played just one match, for Lancashire. The following season, Telford joined Yorkshire, playing four matches for the side in the Twenty20 Cup. In 2021, she took 1 wicket in 3 matches for Yorkshire in the Twenty20 Cup.

In 2020, Telford was named in the Northern Diamonds squad for the Rachael Heyhoe Flint Trophy, but did not play a match. She was retained in the squad for the following season, and made her debut for the side on 28 August 2021, in a Charlotte Edwards Cup match against Western Storm. She went on to play three Rachael Heyhoe Flint Trophy matches.
