= Clifton Park Ground =

Cricket ground in York, England

Coordinates: 53.97251°N 1.10584°W

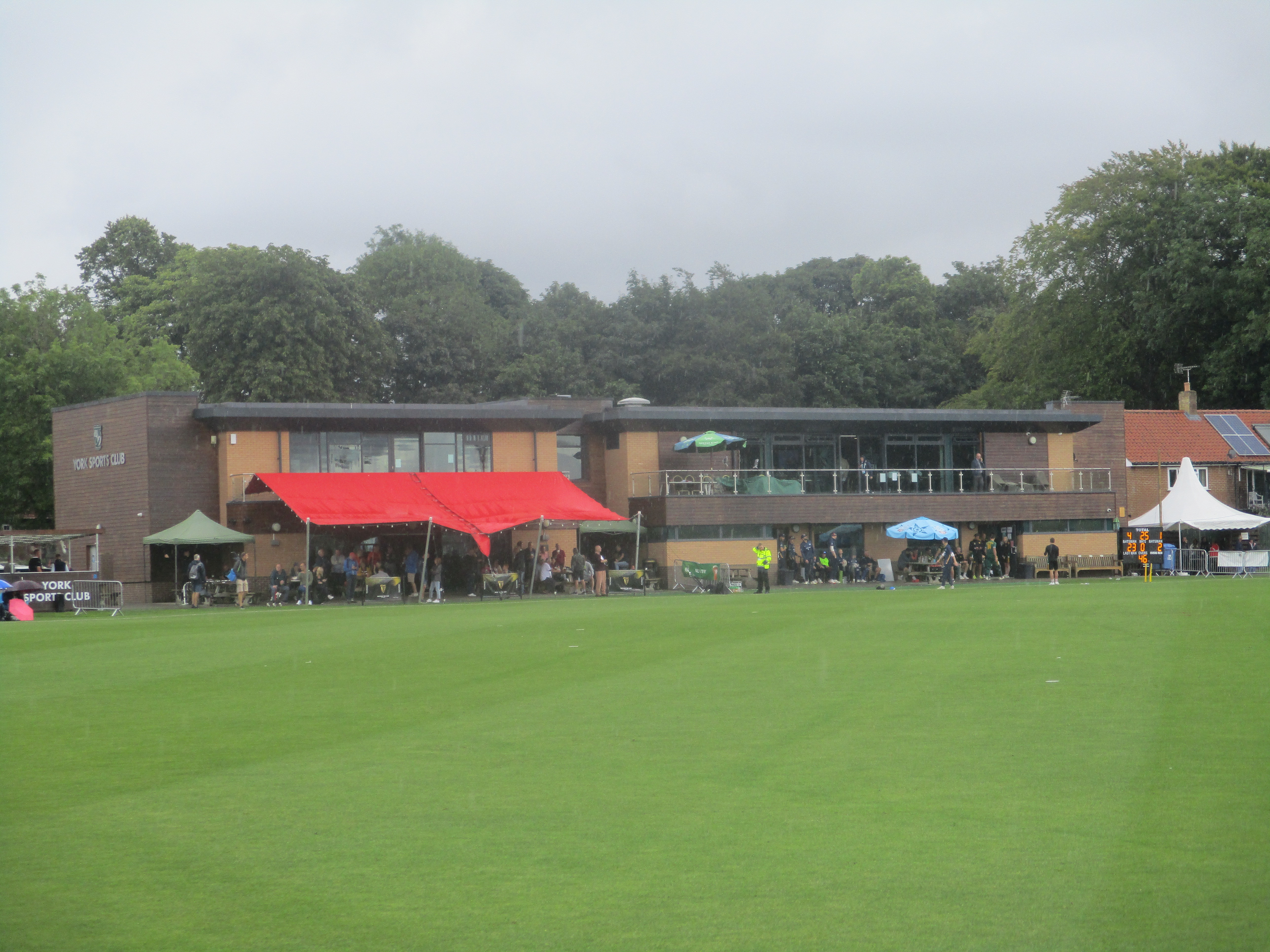
- The pavilion at Clifton Park in 2021

Ground information
- Location: York, North Yorkshire
- Establishment: 1971 (first recorded match)

International information
- Only WODI: 11 July 1973: Australia v Jamaica
- As of 6 September 2020; Source: Ground profile

Clifton Park Ground is a cricket ground in York, North Yorkshire. The first recorded match on the ground was in 1971, when the Yorkshire Second XI played the Lancashire Second XI in the Minor Counties Championship. The ground held its second and final Minor Counties Championship match the following year when Yorkshire Second XI played Cumberland.

Since 1984, the ground has played host to Yorkshire Second XI matches in the Second XI Championship, hosting 20 matches to date and 8 Second XI Trophy matches.

In 1973, the ground held a Women's One Day International between Australia women and Jamaica women in the 1973 Women's Cricket World Cup.

In local domestic cricket, the ground is the home venue of York Cricket Club who play in the Yorkshire Premier League North.

In June 2019, the ground hosted the County Championship fixture between Yorkshire and Warwickshire. It had been 129 years since the last first-class cricket match had been staged in York. The game attracted a crowd of over 8,000 people, spread over four rain affected days. In August 2021, the ground hosted two of Yorkshire's 2021 Royal London One-Day Cup matches between Warwickshire and Nottinghamshire.
