= Helen Fenby =

English cricketer

Personal information
- Full name: Helen Louise Fenby
- Born: 23 November 1998 (age 27); Stockton-on-Tees, County Durham, England
- Batting: Right-handed
- Bowling: Right-arm leg break
- Role: Bowler

Domestic team information
- Years: Team
- 2013–2019: Durham
- 2018–2019: Yorkshire Diamonds
- 2020–2021: North East Warriors
- 2020–2021: Northern Diamonds
- 2021: Northern Superchargers

Career statistics
Competition	WLA	WT20
Matches	45	56
Runs scored	265	215
Batting average	9.81	7.96
100s/50s	0/0	0/0
Top score	43*	24*
Balls bowled	2,134	1,086
Wickets	59	35
Bowling average	21.05	27.37
5 wickets in innings	0	0
10 wickets in match	0	0
Best bowling	4/11	4/20
Catches/stumpings	11/–	14/–
- Source: CricketArchive, 28 September 2021

Helen Louise Fenby (born 23 November 1998) is an English cricketer who plays as a right-arm leg break bowler. She previously captained for the Durham and North East Warriors, as well as playing for Yorkshire Diamonds in the Women's Cricket Super League, Northern Diamonds in regional cricket and Northern Superchargers in The Hundred.

== Early life ==
Fenby was born on 23 November 1998 in Stockton-on-Tees, County Durham. Fenby has also played football for Norton & Stockton Ancients FC.

== Domestic career ==
Fenby made her county debut in 2013, for Durham against Lancashire. Fenby was quickly successful for the side, and was the joint-leading wicket-taker for Durham in both the 2015 and 2016 County Championships, with 13 wickets in both seasons. In 2015, Fenby took two four-wicket hauls, including her List A best bowling figures of 4/11 against Scotland. In 2018, Fenby was again Durham's County Championship joint-leading wicket-taker, again with 13 wickets.

In 2020, Durham merged with Northumberland to form the North East Warriors. Although the side did not play any competitive matches that season due to the COVID-19 pandemic, Fenby captained the side in two friendlies against Scotland in 2020. In 2021, she played five matches for the side in the Twenty20 Cup, taking two wickets.

Fenby also played for Yorkshire Diamonds in the Women's Cricket Super League in 2018 and 2019. She played 12 matches across the two seasons, taking 6 wickets, including her Twenty20 best bowling figures of 4/20 in a match against Surrey Stars in 2019.

In 2020, Fenby played for Northern Diamonds in the Rachael Heyhoe Flint Trophy. She appeared in two matches, but did not take a wicket. She again played two matches for the side in 2021. Fenby was also in the Northern Superchargers squad for The Hundred, but did not play a match.
