= Yorkshire Diamonds =

Former English women's Twenty20 cricket team

Personnel
- Captain: Lauren Winfield
- Coach: Danielle Hazell (2019); Paul Grayson (2017–2018); Rich Pyrah (2016)

Team information
- Colours: Blue
- Founded: 2016
- Home ground: Headingley, Leeds; Clifton Park, York; North Marine Road Ground, Scarborough

History
- WCSL wins: 0
- Official website: Yorkshire Diamonds
T20 kit

Yorkshire Diamonds were an English women's Twenty20 cricket team based in Leeds, Yorkshire. They were formed in 2016 to compete in the inaugural season of the Women's Cricket Super League. They played their home matches at grounds across Yorkshire, including Headingley Cricket Ground and Clifton Park, York, and were partnered with Yorkshire County Cricket Club. They were coached by Danielle Hazell and captained by Lauren Winfield. In 2020, following reforms to the structure of women's domestic cricket, some elements of the Yorkshire Diamonds were retained for a new team, the Northern Diamonds.

== History ==
=== 2016–2019: Women's Cricket Super League ===
Yorkshire Diamonds were formed in 2016 to compete in the new Women's Cricket Super League, partnering with Yorkshire CCC. In their inaugural season, they finished 5th out of 6 in the group stage, winning just one game, against Lancashire Thunder. They fared similarly in 2017, again finishing 5th, with two victories.

In 2018, an expansion in the format, to 10 games per team, saw no change to Yorkshire Diamonds' fortunes, again finishing 5th in the table, with three wins. In their final season, 2019, the Diamonds won five games to achieve their highest ever finish, in 4th, and were the only team to beat eventual winners Western Storm. Diamonds overseas player Jemimah Rodrigues was the second highest run-scorer in the tournament, with 401 runs, including 112* against Southern Vipers. This still meant they missed out on Finals Day, however, and the 2020 restructure of English domestic women's cricket meant that the Yorkshire Diamonds were disbanded, succeeded in spirit by the Northern Diamonds, who represent a larger area, but retain some of their players.

== Home grounds ==
Venue	Games hosted by season				
Venue	16	17	18	19	Total
Headingley Cricket Ground	2	1	2	2	7
Clifton Park, York	–	1	2	2	5
North Marine Road Ground	–	–	1	1	2

== Players ==
Final squad, 2019 season.

- No. denotes the player's squad number, as worn on the back of their shirt.
- ‡ denotes players with international caps.

No.	Name	Nationality	Birth date	Batting style	Bowling style	Notes
Batters
5	Jemimah Rodrigues ‡	India	5 September 2000 (age 25)	Right-handed	Right-arm off break	Overseas player
6	Cordelia Griffith	England	19 September 1995 (age 30)	Right-handed	Right-arm medium	England Academy player
57	Hollie Armitage	England	14 June 1997 (age 29)	Right-handed	Right-arm leg break	England Academy player
All-rounders
24	Leigh Kasperek ‡	New Zealand	15 February 1992 (age 34)	Right-handed	Right-arm off break	Overseas player
48	Alice Davidson-Richards ‡	England	29 May 1994 (age 32)	Right-handed	Right-arm medium	England Performance squad
Wicket-keepers
25	Bess Heath	England	20 August 2001 (age 24)	Right-handed	—	
58	Lauren Winfield ‡	England	16 August 1990 (age 35)	Right-handed	—	Club captain; England Performance squad
77	Alyssa Healy ‡	Australia	24 March 1990 (age 36)	Right-handed	—	Overseas player
Bowlers
10	Helen Fenby	England	23 November 1998 (age 27)	Right-handed	Right-arm leg break	England Academy player
23	Katie Levick	England	17 July 1991 (age 35)	Right-handed	Right-arm leg break	England Academy player
24	Katie George ‡	England	7 April 1999 (age 27)	Right-handed	Left-arm medium	England Performance squad
26	Katherine Brunt ‡	England	2 July 1985 (age 41)	Right-handed	Right-arm fast-medium	England Performance squad
42	Beth Langston ‡	England	6 September 1992 (age 33)	Right-handed	Right-arm medium	England Performance squad
50	Linsey Smith ‡	England	10 March 1995 (age 31)	Right-handed	Slow left-arm orthodox	England Performance squad
64	Georgia Davis	England	3 June 1999 (age 27)	Right-handed	Right-arm off break	

=== Overseas players ===
- Shabnim Ismail – South Africa (2016)
- Beth Mooney – Australia (2016, 2018)
- Alex Blackwell – Australia (2016)
- Chamari Atapattu – Sri Lanka (2017–2018)
- Sophie Devine – New Zealand (2017)
- Suné Luus – South Africa (2017)
- Delissa Kimmince – Australia (2018)
- Alyssa Healy – Australia (2019)
- Jemimah Rodrigues – India (2019)
- Leigh Kasperek – New Zealand (2019)

== Seasons ==
Season	Final standing	League standings									Notes
Season	Final standing	P	W	L	T	NR	BP	Pts	NRR	Pos	Notes
2016	Group stage	5	1	4	0	0	1	3	−0.362	5th	DNQ
2017	Group stage	5	2	3	0	0	0	8	−0.318	5th	DNQ
2018	Group stage	10	3	6	0	1	1	15	−0.290	5th	DNQ
2019	Group stage	10	5	5	0	0	0	20	−0.456	4th	DNQ

== Statistics ==
=== Overall Results ===
Women's Cricket Super League – summary of results
Year	Played	Wins	Losses	Tied	NR	Win %
2016	5	1	4	0	0	20.00
2017	5	2	3	0	0	40.00
2018	10	3	6	0	1	30.00
2019	10	5	5	0	0	50.00
Total	30	11	18	0	1	36.66

- Abandoned matches are counted as NR (no result)
- Win or loss by super over or boundary count are counted as tied.

=== Teamwise Result summary ===
Opposition	Mat	Won	Lost	Tied	NR	Win %
Lancashire Thunder	6	4	2	0	0	66.66
Loughborough Lightning	6	2	4	0	0	33.33
Surrey Stars	6	2	3	0	1	33.33
Southern Vipers	6	2	4	0	0	33.33
Western Storm	6	1	5	0	0	16.66

== Records ==
- Highest team total: 185/6, v Southern Vipers on 25 August 2019.
- Lowest team total: 64, v Southern Vipers on 30 July 2016.
- Highest individual score: 112*, Jemimah Rodrigues v Southern Vipers on 25 August 2019.
- Best individual bowling analysis: 5/26, Katherine Brunt v Southern Vipers on 2 August 2018.
- Most runs: 627 in 28 matches, Lauren Winfield.
- Most wickets: 29 wickets in 28 matches, Katie Levick.
