= List of Yorkshire County Cricket Club players =

This is a list in alphabetical order of cricketers who have played for Yorkshire County Cricket Club in top-class matches since the club was founded in 1863. Like the Yorkshire county teams formed by earlier organisations, the county club has always held first-class status. It has been a List A team since the beginning of limited overs cricket in 1963; and a top-class Twenty20 team since the inauguration of the Twenty20 Cup in 2003.

The details are the player's usual name followed by the years in which he was active as a Yorkshire player and then his name is given as it usually appears on match scorecards. Note that many players represented other top-class teams besides Yorkshire. All players whose Yorkshire career ended in or before 2021 are sourced to CricketArchive.

The list excludes Second XI and other players who did not play for the club's first team; and players whose first team appearances were in minor matches only. Players who represented the county before 1863 are included if they also played for the county club but excluded if not.

As of June 2025

== A ==
- Alfred Ackroyd (1879): A. Ackroyd
- Finn Allen (2022): F. H. Allen
- Spencer Allen (1924): S. Allen
- Reginald Allen (1921–1925): W. R. Allen
- Joe Ambler (1886): Joe Ambler
- George Anderson (1863–1869): G. Anderson
- Paul Anderson (1988): P. N. Anderson
- Claude Anson (1924): C. E. Anson
- Charles Appleton (1865): C. Appleton
- Bob Appleyard (1950–1958): R. Appleyard
- Charles Armitage (1873–1878): C. I. Armitage
- Tom Armitage (1872–1878): T. Armitage
- David Ash (1965): D. L. Ash
- John Ashman (1948–1951): J. R. Ashman
- Ron Aspinall (1946–1950): R. Aspinall
- Walter Aspinall (1880): W. Aspinall
- Frederick Asquith (1903): F. T. Asquith
- Bill Athey (1976–1983): C. W. J. Athey
- George Atkinson (1863–1870): G. R. Atkinson
- Harry Atkinson (1907): H. Atkinson
- Azeem Rafiq (2008–2018): Azeem Rafiq

== B ==
- Edgar Backhouse (1931): E. N. Backhouse
- Henry Badger (1921–1922): H. D. Badger
- Brian Bainbridge (1961–1963): A. B. Bainbridge
- Francis Baines (1888): F. E. Baines
- Arthur Bairstow (1896–1900): A. Bairstow
- David Bairstow (1970–1990): D. L. Bairstow
- Jonny Bairstow (2007–2025): J. M. Bairstow
- George Baker (1877–1884): G. R. Baker
- Robert Baker (1874–1875): R. Baker
- Thomas Baker (2000–2001): T. M. Baker
- Chris Balderstone (1961–1970): J. C. Balderstone
- Gary Ballance (2008–2021): G. S. Ballance
- Alan Barber (1929–1930): A. T. Barber
- Wilf Barber (1926–1947): W. Barber
- Eric Barraclough (1949–1950): E. S. Barraclough
- Billy Bates (1877–1887): W. Bates
- William Bates (1907–1913): W. E. Bates
- Gareth Batty (1997–2000): G. J. Batty
- Jeremy Batty (1989–1994): J. D. Batty
- George Bayes (1910–1921): G. W. Bayes
- Finlay Bean (2022–2025): F. J. Bean
- Harold Beaumont (1946–1947): H. Beaumont
- John Beaumont (1877–1880): J. Beaumont
- Harry Bedford (1928): H. Bedford
- Walter Bedford (1903): W. Bedford
- John Bell (1921–1923): J. T. Bell
- John Berry (1863–1867): J. Berry
- Joseph Berry (1864–1874): J. Berry
- Philip Berry (1986–1990): P. J. Berry
- Dom Bess (2019–2025): D. M. Bess
- Tino Best (2009–2010): T. L. Best
- George Betts (1873–1874): G. Betts
- Michael Bevan (1994–1996): M. G. Bevan
- Jimmy Binks (1955–1969): J. G. Binks
- John Binns (1898): J. Binns
- Dickie Bird (1956–1959): H. D. Bird
- Jack Birkenshaw (1958–1960): J. Birkenshaw
- Ben Birkhead (2019–2020): B. D. Birkhead
- Thomas Birtles (1913–1924): T. J. D. Birtles
- John Blackburn (1956): J. D. H. Blackburn
- Joseph Blackburn (1876–1877): J. S. Blackburn
- William Blackburn (1919–1920): W. E. Blackburn
- John Blain (2004–2010): J. A. R. Blain
- Wilfred Blake (1880): W. Blake
- Richard Blakey (1985–2004): R. J. Blakey
- Emmanuel Blamires (1877): E. Blamires
- Greg Blewett (1999): G. S. Blewett
- Ray Bloom (1964): G. R. Bloom
- Henry Bocking (1865): H. Bocking
- John Boden (1878): J. G. Boden
- Benjamin Bolton (1890–1891): B. C. Bolton
- Brian Bolus (1956–1962): J. B. Bolus
- Arthur Booth (1931–1947): A. Booth
- Major Booth (1908–1914): M. W. Booth
- Paul Booth (1982–1989): P. A. Booth
- Roy Booth (1951–1955): R. Booth
- Michael Bore (1969–1978): M. K. Bore
- Peter Borrill (1971): P. D. Borrill
- William Bosomworth (1872–1880): W. E. Bosomworth
- Isaac Bottomley (1878–1880): I. H. Bottomley
- Thomas Bottomley (1934–1935): T. Bottomley
- William Bower (1883): W. H. Bower
- Bill Bowes (1929–1947): W. E. Bowes
- Geoffrey Boycott (1962–1986): G. Boycott
- Thomas Brackin (1882): T. Brackin
- Kraigg Brathwaite (2017): K. C. Brathwaite
- Peter Brayshay (1952): P. B. Brayshay
- Horace Brearley (1937): H. Brearley
- Don Brennan (1947–1953): D. V. Brennan
- Tim Bresnan (2001–2019): T. T. Bresnan
- George Britton (1867): G. Britton
- Arthur Broadbent (1909–1910): A. Broadbent
- Wilfred Broadhead (1929): W. B. Broadhead
- Mark Broadhurst (1991–1994): M. Broadhurst
- Harry Brook (2016–2025): H. C. Brook
- James Brook (1923): J. W. Brook
- Bernard Brooke (1950): B. Brooke
- Jack Brooks (2012–2018): J. A. Brooks
- Gerard Brophy (2006–2012): G. L. Brophy
- Peter Broughton (1956): P. N. Broughton
- Alfred Brown (1872): A. Brown
- Jack Brown (1889–1904): J. T. Brown
- John Brown (1897–1903): J. T. Brown
- William Brown (1902–1908): W. Brown
- Thomas Brownhill (1863–71): T. Brownhill
- Jack Brumfitt (1938): J. Brumfitt
- Jordan Buckingham (2025): J. S. D. Buckingham
- Syd Buller (1930): J. S. Buller
- John Bulmer (1891): J. R. L. Bulmer
- Tom Burgess (1895): T. Burgess
- Eric Burgin (1952–1953): E. Burgin
- John Burman (1867): J. Burman
- Ronnie Burnet (1957–1959): J. R. Burnet
- Matthew Burrows (1880–1881): M. Burrows
- Cecil Burton (1907–1921): D. C. F. Burton
- Claude Burton (1914): R. C. Burton
- Edward Butterfield (1870): E. B. Butterfield
- David Byas (1985–2001): D. Byas
- John Byrom (1874): J. L. Byrom

== C ==
- Eliot Callis (2016–2017): E. Callis
- James Cammish (1954): J. W. Cammish
- Phil Carrick (1970–1993): P. Carrick
- Edmund Carter (1876–1881): E. S. Carter
- William Cartman (1891): W. H. Cartman
- Karl Carver (2014–2018): K. Carver
- George Cawthray (1939–1952): G. Cawthray
- Peter Chadwick (1960–1965): J. P. G. Chadwick
- Albert Champion (1876–1880): A. Champion
- Colin Chapman (1990–1998): C. A. Chapman
- Albert Charlesworth (1894–1895): A. P. Charlesworth
- Raleigh Chichester-Constable (1919): R. C. J. Chichester-Constable
- Jafer Chohan (2023–2025): J. A. Chohan
- Tony Clarkson (1963–1976): A. Clarkson
- Hugh Claughton (1914–1919): H. M. Claughton
- Mitchell Claydon (2005–2006): M. E. Claydon
- Robert Clayton (1870–1879): R. O. Clayton
- Mark Cleary (2005): M. F. Cleary
- Henry Clegg (1881–1891): H. Clegg
- Ben Cliff (2022–2025): B. M. Cliff
- Christopher Clifford (1972): C. C. Clifford
- Brian Close (1949–1970): D. B. Close
- Gareth Clough (1998): G. D. Clough
- Ben Coad (2013–2025): B. O. Coad
- Robert Collinson (1896–1897): R. W. Collinson
- Howard Cooper (1971–1980): H. P. Cooper
- Philip Cooper (1910): P. E. Cooper
- Geoff Cope (1966–1980): G. A. Cope
- Alexander Corbett (1881): A. M. Corbett
- Stephen Coverdale (1973–1980): S. P. Coverdale
- William Coverdale (1888): W. Coverdale
- Michael Cowan (1953–1962): M. J. Cowan
- Michael Cownley (1952): J. M. Cownley
- Alec Coxon (1945–1950): A. Coxon
- Victor Craven (2000–2004): V. J. Craven
- George Crawford (1914–1926): G. H. Crawford
- Michael Crawford (1951): M. G. Crawford
- Ernest Creighton (1888): E. Creighton
- Harry Crick (1937–1947): H. Crick
- Ralph Crookes (1879): R. Crookes
- Samuel Crossland (1883–1886): S. M. Crossland
- Arthur Crowther (1905): A. Crowther
- William Cuttell (1864–1871): W. Cuttell

== D ==
- Andrew Dalton (1969–1972): A. J. Dalton
- Thomas Darnton (1864–1868): T. Darnton
- Kenneth Davidson (1933–1935): K. R. Davidson
- Joseph Dawes (1865): J. Dawes
- Ismail Dawood (2004–2005): I. Dawood
- Edwin Dawson (1863–1874): E. Dawson
- Richard Dawson (2000–2006): R. K. J. Dawson
- William Dawson (1870): W. A. Dawson
- Albert Day (1885–1888): A. G. Day
- Frank Dennis (1928–1933): F. Dennis
- Simon Dennis (1980–1988): S. J. Dennis
- David Denton (1894–1920): D. Denton
- Joe Denton (1887–1888): J. Denton
- Harry Dewse (1873): H. Dewse
- George Deyes (1905–1907): G. Deyes
- Robert Dick (1911): R. D. Dick
- Arthur Dobson (1879): A. Dobson
- Matthew Doidge (1990): M. J. Doidge
- Arthur Dolphin (1905–1927): A. Dolphin
- Stanley Douglas (1925–1934): J. S. Douglas
- Alonzo Drake (1909–1914): A. Drake
- John Drake (1923–1924): J. Drake
- Dominic Drakes (2022): D. C. Drakes
- Jeremiah Driver (1889): J. Driver
- Harry Duke (2021–2025): H. G. Duke
- Theodore Dury (1878–1881): T. S. Dury
- William Dyson (1887): W. L. Dyson

== E ==
- Wilson Earnshaw (1890–1896): W. Earnshaw
- David Eastwood (1870–1877): D. Eastwood
- Ronald Eckersley (1945): R. Eckersley
- Mickey Edwards (2023–2024): M. W. Edwards
- Frederick Elam (1900–1902): F. W. Elam
- Matthew Elliott (2002): M. T. G. Elliott
- John Ellis (1887–1892): J. E. Ellis
- Samuel Ellis (1880): S. Ellis
- John Elms (1905): J. E. Elms
- Christopher Elstub (2000–2002): C. J. Elstub
- Tom Emmett (1866–1888): T. Emmett

== F ==
- Albert Farrar (1906): A. Farrar
- Michael Fearnley (1962–1964): M. C. Fearnley
- William Featherby (1920): W. D. Featherby
- Gary Fellows (1998–2003): G. M. Fellows
- Lockie Ferguson (2021): L. H. Ferguson
- Vishwa Fernando (2024): M. V. T. Fernando
- Donovan Ferreira (2024): D. Ferreira
- Kenneth Fiddling (1938–1946): K. Fiddling
- Aaron Finch (2014–2015): A. J. Finch
- Matthew Firbank (2025): M. S. Firbank
- Alfred Firth (1869): A. Firth
- Edgar Firth (1894): E. B. Firth
- Edward Firth (1912): E. L. Firth
- Jack Firth (1949–1950): J. Firth
- Horace Fisher (1928–1936): H. Fisher
- Ian Fisher (1994–2001): I. D. Fisher
- Matthew Fisher (2015–2024): M. D. Fisher
- Samuel Flaxington (1881–1882): S. Flaxington
- Stephen Fleming (2003): S. P. Fleming
- Stuart Fletcher (1983–1991): S. D. Fletcher
- William Fletcher (1891–1892): W. Fletcher
- Bill Foord (1947–1953): C. W. Foord
- Ernest Foster (1893–1901): E. Foster
- Michael Foster (1993–1994): M. J. Foster
- Thomas Foster (1894–1896): T. W. Foster
- Will Fraine (2019–2023): W. A. R. Fraine
- Joseph Frank (1881): J. Frank
- Robert Frank (1889–1903): R. W. Frank
- George Freeman (1865–1881): G. Freeman

== G ==
- Shannon Gabriel (2022): S. T. Gabriel
- Andrew Gale (2004–2016): A. W. Gale
- Callum Geldart (2010–2011): C. J. Geldart
- Paul Gibb (1935–1946): P. A. Gibb
- Herschelle Gibbs (2010): H. H. Gibbs
- Barney Gibson (2011): B. P. Gibson
- Ryan Gibson (2013–2017): R. Gibson
- Charles Gifkins (1880): C. J. Gifkins
- Chris Gilbert (2006–2007): C. R. Gilbert
- Fairfax Gill (1906): F. Gill
- Jason Gillespie (2006–2007): J. N. Gillespie
- Keith Gillhouley (1961): K. Gillhouley
- Darren Gough (1989–2008): D. Gough
- Alfred Goulder (1929): A. Goulder
- Andy Gray (2001–2004): A. K. D. Gray
- Paul Grayson (1990–1995): A. P. Grayson
- Andrew Greenwood (1869–1880): A. Greenwood
- Frank Greenwood (1929–1932): F. E. Greenwood
- Luke Greenwood (1863–1875): L. Greenwood
- Charles Grimshaw (1904–1908): C. H. Grimshaw
- Irwin Grimshaw (1880–1888): I. Grimshaw
- Simon Guy (2000–2011): S. M. Guy

== H ==
- Stell Haggas (1878–1882): S. Haggas
- Schofield Haigh (1895–1913): S. Haigh
- Brian Hall (1952): B. Hall
- Charles Hall (1928–1934): C. H. Hall
- John Hall (1863): J. Hall
- Louis Hall (1873–1894): L. Hall
- Harry Halliday (1938–1953): H. Halliday
- Charles Halliley (1872–1873): C. Halliley
- Arnold Hamer (1938–1945): A. Hamer
- Gavin Hamilton (1994–2003): G. M. Hamilton
- Alan Hampshire (1975): A. W. Hampshire
- John Hampshire (1961–1981): J. H. Hampshire
- John Hampshire senior (1937): J. Hampshire
- Peter Handscomb (2017): P. S. P. Handscomb
- Oliver Hannon-Dalby (2007–2013): O. J. Hannon-Dalby
- William Harbord (1929–1935): W. E. Harbord
- Richard Harden (1998–2000): R. J. Harden
- Charles Hardisty (1906–1909): C. H. Hardisty
- Herbert Hargreaves (1934–1938): H. S. Hargreaves
- Steve Harmison (2012): S. J. Harmison
- Haris Rauf (2022): Haris Rauf
- William Harris (1884–1887): W. Harris
- George Harrison (1883–1892): G. P. Harrison
- Harold Harrison (1907): H. Harrison
- William Hendy Harrison (1888–1889): W. H. Harrison
- Herbert Hart (1883–1888): H. W. Hart
- Philip Hart (1981): P. R. Hart
- Harry Hartington (1904–1911): H. E. Hartington
- Peter Hartley (1985–1997): P. J. Hartley
- Neil Hartley (1978–1989): S. N. Hartley
- Ian Harvey (2004–2005): I. J. Harvey
- Tony Hatton (1960–1961): A. G. Hatton
- Lord Hawke (1881–1911): Lord Hawke
- Harry Hayley (1881–1898): H. Hayley
- William Haywood (1878): W. J. Haywood
- Travis Head (2016): T. M. Head
- John Hicks (1872–1876): J. Hicks
- James Higgins (1901–1905): J. Higgins
- Allen Hill (1871–1883): A. Hill
- George Hill (2020–2025): G. C. H. Hill
- Henry Hill (1887–1891): H. Hill
- Lewis Hill (1882): L. G. Hill
- Edward Hirst (1877–1889): E. T. Hirst
- Ernest Hirst (1881): E. W. Hirst
- George Hirst (1890–1929): G. H. Hirst
- Thomas Hirst (1899): T. H. Hirst
- Andrew Hodd (2012–2018): A. J. Hodd
- Dan Hodgson (2012–2015): D. M. Hodgson
- Geoffrey Hodgson (1964): G. Hodgson
- Isaac Hodgson (1863–1866): I. Hodgson
- Lee Hodgson (2008–2011): L. J. Hodgson
- Philip Hodgson (1954–1956): P. Hodgson
- Matthew Hoggard (1996–2009): M. J. Hoggard
- Bill Holdsworth (1952–1953): W. E. N. Holdsworth
- Gideon Holgate (1865–1867): G. Holgate
- Percy Holmes (1913–1933): P. Holmes
- Shai Hope (2023): S. D. Hope
- Norman Horner (1949–1950): N. F. Horner
- Ian Houseman (1989–1991): I. J. Houseman
- Theodore Hoyle (1919): T. H. Hoyle
- Bennett Hudson (1880): B. Hudson
- David Hunter (1888–1909): D. Hunter
- Joseph Hunter (1878–1889): J. Hunter
- Paul Hutchison (1995–2001): P. M. Hutchison
- Sir Leonard Hutton (1934–1955): L. Hutton
- Richard Hutton (1962–1974): R. A. Hutton

== I ==
- Roger Iddison (1863–1876): R. Iddison
- Ray Illingworth (1951–1968; 1982–1983): R. Illingworth
- Imran Tahir (2007): Imran Tahir
- Peter Ingham (1979–1981): P. G. Ingham
- John Inglis (1999–2000): J. W. Inglis
- Inzamam-ul-Haq (2007): Inzamam-ul-Haq

== J ==
- Stanley Jackson (1890–1907): F. S. Jackson
- Samuel Jackson (1891): S. R. Jackson
- Thomas Jacques (1927–1936): T. A. Jacques
- Freddie Jakeman (1946–1947): F. Jakeman
- Brian James (1954): B. James
- Phil Jaques (2004–2013): P. A. Jaques
- Paul Jarvis (1981–1993): P. W. Jarvis
- Colin Johnson (1969–1980): C. Johnson
- Joseph Johnson (1936–1939): J. Johnson
- Mark Johnson (1981): M. Johnson
- Jonathan Joy (1863–1867): J. Joy
- Albert Judson (1920): A. Judson

== K ==
- Dimuth Karunaratne (2022): F. D. M. Karunaratne
- Simon Katich (2002): S. M. Katich
- Haven Kaye (1872–1873): H. Kaye
- Harold Kaye (1907–1908): H. S. Kaye
- Gary Keedy (1993–1994): G. Keedy
- Geoffrey Keighley (1947–1951): W. G. Keighley
- Simon Kellett (1989–1995): S. A. Kellett
- Noah Kelly (2024): N. M. Kelly
- George Kennie (1927): G. Kennie
- Richard Kettleborough (1994–1997): R. A. Kettleborough
- Sam Kilburn (1896): S. Kilburn
- Norman Kilner (1919–1923): N. Kilner
- Roy Kilner (1911–1927): R. Kilner
- Anthony King (1955): A. M. King
- Peter Kippax (1961–1962): P. J. Kippax
- Steven Kirby (2001–2004): S. P. Kirby
- Tom Kohler-Cadmore (2017–2022): T. Kohler-Cadmore
- Deon Kruis (2005–2009): G. J. Kruis

== L ==
- Greg Lambert (1999–2000): G. A. Lambert
- William Lancaster (1895): W. W. Lancaster
- Charles Landon (1878–1882): C. W. Landon
- William Law (1871–1873): W. Law
- Mark Lawson (2004–2008): M. A. K. Lawson
- Barrie Leadbeater (1966–1979): B. Leadbeater
- Eddie Leadbeater (1949–1968): E. Leadbeater
- Harry Leadbeater (1884–1890): H. Leadbeater
- Jack Leaning (2012–2019): J. A. Leaning
- Gerald Leatham (1874–1886): G. A. B. Leatham
- Roland Leather (1906): R. S. Leather
- Charles Lee (1952): C. Lee
- Frederick Lee (1882–1890): F. Lee
- George Lee (1879): G. H. Lee
- Herbert Lee (1885): H. Lee
- James Lee (1867): J. E. Lee
- James Lee (2006–2011): J. E. Lee
- Dom Leech (2020–2024): D. J. Leech
- Alex Lees (2010–2018): A. Z. Lees
- Alfred Legard (1910): A. D. Legard
- Darren Lehmann (1997–2006): D. S. Lehmann
- Jake Lehmann (2016): J. S. Lehmann
- Ted Lester (1945–1964): E. I. Lester
- Maurice Leyland (1920–1947): M. Leyland
- Alex Lilley (2010–2011): A. E. Lilley
- Lewis Linaker (1909): L. Linaker
- Benjamin Lister (1874–1878): B. Lister
- Joseph Lister (1954): J. Lister
- Kenelm Lister-Kaye (1928): K. A. Lister-Kaye
- Ephraim Lockwood (1868–1888): E. Lockwood
- Henry Lockwood (1877–1882): H. Lockwood
- Tommy Lodge (1948): J. T. Lodge
- James Logan (2018–2019): J. E. G. Logan
- Thomas Loten (2019–2022): T. W. Loten
- Jim Love (1975–1989): J. D. Love
- George Lowe (1902): G. E. Lowe
- Jordan Lowe (2010): J. R. Lowe
- Frank Lowson (1949–1958): F. A. Lowson
- David Lucas (2005): D. S. Lucas
- Edward Lumb (1872–1886): E. Lumb
- Michael Lumb (2000–2006): M. J. Lumb
- Richard Lumb (1969–1984): R. G. Lumb
- Arthur Lupton (1908–1927): A. W. Lupton
- Will Luxton (2022–2025): W. Luxton
- George Lynas (1867): G. G. Lynas
- Adam Lyth (2006–2025): A. Lyth

== M ==
- George Macaulay (1920–1935): G. G. Macaulay
- Anthony McGrath (1994–2012): A. McGrath
- Francis McHugh (1949): F. P. McHugh
- Clint McKay (2010): C. J. McKay
- Conor McKerr (2024): C. McKerr
- Keshav Maharaj (2019): K. A. Maharaj
- Dawid Malan (2020–2025): D. J. Malan
- Shaun Marsh (2017): S. E. Marsh
- Amos Marshall (1874): A. Marshall
- Damien Martyn (2003): D. R. Martyn
- Allan Mason (1947–1950): A. Mason
- Edmund Maude (1866): E. Maude
- Glenn Maxwell (2015): G. J. Maxwell
- Ashley Metcalfe (1982–1995): A. A. Metcalfe
- William Micklethwait (1911): W. H. Micklethwait
- James Middlebrook (1998–2015): J. D. Middlebrook
- Willie Middlebrook (1888–1889): W. Middlebrook
- Charles Midgley (1906): C. A. Midgley
- Ben Mike (2022–2023): B. W. M. Mike
- David Miller (2012): D. A. Miller
- Stuart Milburn (1992–1995): S. M. Milburn
- Frank Milligan (1894–1898): F. W. Milligan
- Matt Milnes (2023–2025): M. E. Milnes
- Arthur Mitchell (1922–1945): A. Mitchell
- Frank Mitchell (1894–1904): F. Mitchell
- Moin Ashraf (2010–13): Moin Ashraf
- George Monks (1952): G. D. Monks
- Robert Moorhouse (1888–1899): R. Moorhouse
- Dan Moriarty (2023–2025): D. Moriarty
- Morné Morkel (2008): M. Morkel
- Alex Morris (1994–1997): A. C. Morris
- Henry Mosley (1881): H. Mosley
- Arthur Motley (1879): A. Motley
- Joseph Mounsey (1890–1897): J. T. Mounsey
- Martyn Moxon (1980–1997): M. D. Moxon
- Hubert Myers (1901–1910): H. Myers
- Matthew Myers (1876–1881): M. Myers

== N ==
- Naved-ul-Hasan (2008–2009): Naved-ul-Hasan
- John Naylor (1953): J. E. Naylor
- John Newstead (1903–1913): J. T. Newstead
- Tony Nicholson (1962–1975): A. G. Nicholson
- Neil Nicholson (1988–1989): N. G. Nicholson
- Sam Northeast (2021): S. A. Northeast

== O ==
- Will O'Rourke: W. O'Rourke
- William Oates (1874–1875): W. Oates
- William Oates (1956): W. F. Oates
- Chris Old (1966–1982): C. M. Old
- Stephen Oldham (1974–1992): S. Oldham
- Edgar Oldroyd (1910–1931): E. Oldroyd
- Duanne Olivier (2019–2021): D. Olivier
- Charles Oyston (1900–1909): C. Oyston

== P ==
- Doug Padgett (1951–1971): D. E. V. Padgett
- Hubert Padgett (1952): G. H. Padgett
- John Padgett (1882–1889): J. Padgett
- Bradley Parker (1992–1999): B. Parker
- Cec Parkin (1906): C. H. Parkin
- John Parratt (1888–1891): J. Parratt
- John Parton (1889): J. W. Parton
- Ajaz Patel (2019): A. Y. Patel
- Steven Patterson (2005–2022): S. A. Patterson
- Harry Pearson (1878–1880): H. E. Pearson
- John Pearson (1934–1936): J. H. Pearson
- Ted Peate (1879–1887): E. Peate
- Bobby Peel (1882–1897): R. Peel
- Joshua Penny (1891): J. H. Penny
- Christopher Pickles (1985–1992): C. S. Pickles
- David Pickles (1957–1960): D. Pickles
- Mathew Pillans (2018–2021): M. W. Pillans
- George Pinder (1867–1881): G. Pinder
- Bob Platt (1955–1963): R. K. Platt
- Liam Plunkett (2012–2018): L. E. Plunkett
- David Pollard (1865): D. Pollard
- George Pollitt (1899): G. Pollitt
- Nicolas Pooran (2019): N. Pooran
- Josh Poysden (2018–2021): J. E. Poysden
- Charles Prest (1864): C. H. Prest
- Joseph Preston (1883–1889): J. M. Preston
- Thomas Pride (1887–1888): T. Pride
- Iain Priestley (1989): I. M. Priestley
- Cheteshwar Pujara (2015–2018): C. A. Pujara
- Peter Pullan (1883–1884): P. Pullan
- Rich Pyrah (2004–2015): R. M. Pyrah

== R ==
- Everard Radcliffe (1909–1911): E. J. R. H. Radcliffe
- Alan Ramage (1975–1983): A. Ramage
- Gary Ramsden (1999–2001): G. Ramsden
- Gurman Randhawa (2010–2013): G. S. Randhawa
- Stanley Raper (1935–1947): J. R. S. Raper
- Adil Rashid (2006–2022): A. U. Rashid
- Jeet Raval (2018): J. A. Raval
- Eric Rawlin (1927–1936): E. R. Rawlin
- John Rawlin (1880–1885): J. T. Rawlin
- Elisha Rawlinson (1867–1875): E. B. Rawlinson
- Johnny Read (2016–2017): J. Read
- Joseph Redfearn (1890): J. Redfearn
- George Render (1919): G. W. A. Render
- Matthew Revis (2019–2025): M. L. Revis
- Arthur Rhodes (1932–1934): A. C. Rhodes
- Herbert Rhodes (1878–1883): H. E. Rhodes
- Steve Rhodes (1981–1984): S. J. Rhodes
- Wilfred Rhodes (1897–1930): W. Rhodes
- Will Rhodes (2015–2017): W. M. H. Rhodes
- William Rhodes (1911): W. Rhodes
- John Richardson (1936–1947): J. A. Richardson
- Richie Richardson (1993–1994): R. B. Richardson
- Scott Richardson (2000–2003): S. A. Richardson
- Ryan Rickelton (2023): R. D. Rickelton
- Harry Riley (1895–1900): H. Riley
- Martin Riley (1878–1882): M. Riley
- Billy Ringrose (1901–1906): W. Ringrose
- Arthur Robinson (1971–1977): A. L. Robinson
- Edward Robinson (1887): E. Robinson
- Emmott Robinson (1919–1931): E. Robinson
- Ellis Robinson (1934–1949): E. P. Robinson
- Henry Robinson (1879): H. Robinson
- Mark Robinson (1991–1995): M. A. Robinson
- Ollie Robinson (2013–14): O. E. Robinson
- Phil Robinson (1984–1991): P. E. Robinson
- Walter Robinson (1876–1877): W. Robinson
- Charlie Roebuck (2010): C. G. Roebuck
- Joe Root (2009–2025): J. E. Root
- Edward Roper (1878–1880): E. Roper
- James Rothery (1903–1910): J. W. Rothery
- Joseph Rowbotham (1863–1883): J. Rowbotham
- Jacques Rudolph (2007–2011): J. A. Rudolph
- Horace Rudston (1902–1907): H. Rudston
- Mel Ryan (1954–1965): M. Ryan
- Louis Ryder (1924): L. Ryder

== S ==
- John Sadler (2002): J. L. Sadler
- Ben Sanderson (2007–2011): B. W. Sanderson
- Sarfraz Ahmed (2017): Sarfraz Ahmed
- Saud Shakeel (2023): Saud Shakeel
- George Savile (1867–1874): G. Savile
- Joe Sayers (2003–2013): J. J. Sayers
- Chris Schofield (1996): C. J. Schofield
- Dennis Schofield (1970–1974): D. Schofield
- Emanuel Scott (1864): E. Scott
- Ben Sears (2025): B. V. Sears
- Herbert Sedgwick (1906): H. A. Sedgwick
- Arthur Sellers (1889–1899): A. Sellers
- Brian Sellers (1932–1948): A. B. Sellers
- William Shackleton (1928–1934): W. A. Shackleton
- Shadab Khan (2022): Shadab Khan
- Ajmal Shahzad (2004–2012): A. Shahzad
- Shan Masood (2023–2024): Shan Masood
- Kevin Sharp (1976–1991): K. Sharp
- Charles Sharpe (1875): C. M. Sharpe
- Phil Sharpe (1957–1974): P. J. Sharpe
- Christopher Shaw (1984–1988): C. Shaw
- James Shaw (1896–1897): J. Shaw
- Josh Shaw (2015–2019): J. Shaw
- Ernest Sheepshanks (1929): E. R. Sheepshanks
- Donald Shepherd (1938): D. A. Shepherd
- William Shotton (1865–1874): W. Shotton
- Jack Shutt (2019–2023): J. W. Shutt
- Arnie Sidebottom (1973–1991): A. Sidebottom
- Ryan Sidebottom (1997–2017): R. J. Sidebottom
- Robert Sidgwick (1882): R. Sidgwick
- Chris Silverwood (1992–2005): C. E. W. Silverwood
- Stephen Silvester (1976–1977): S. Silvester
- Edward Simpson (1889–1891): E. T. B. Simpson
- Herbert Sims (1875–1877): H. M. Sims
- Yuvraj Singh (2003): Y. Singh
- William Slinn (1863–1864): W. Slinn
- Frank Smailes (1932–1948): T. F. Smailes
- Kenneth Smales (1948–1950): K. Smales
- Alfred Smith (1868–1874): A. F. Smith
- Ernest Smith (1888–1907): E. Smith
- Ernest Smith (1914–1926): E. Smith
- Fred Smith (1903): F. Smith
- Fred Smith (1911): F. Smith
- George Smith (1901–1906): G. Smith
- John Smith (1865): J. Smith
- Neil Smith (1970–1971): N. Smith
- Rodney Smith (1968–1970): R. Smith
- Walker Smith (1874): W. Smith
- William Smith (1865–1874): W. Smith
- Gerald Smithson (1946–1950): G. A. Smithson
- James Smurthwaite (1938–1939): J. Smurthwaite
- Abraham Sowden (1878–1887): A. Sowden
- Dick Squire (1893): D. Squire
- Peter Squires (1971–1976): P. J. Squires
- Harry Stanley (1911–1913): H. C. Stanley
- R. T. Stanyforth (1928): R. T. Stanyforth
- Mark Steketee (2023): M. T. Steketee
- Mitchell Starc (2012): M. A. Starc
- Barry Stead (1959): B. Stead
- Richard Stemp (1992–1998): R. D. Stemp
- Ned Stephenson (1863–1873): E. Stephenson
- John Stephenson (1923–1926): J. S. Stephenson
- Graham Stevenson (1973–1986): G. B. Stevenson
- Mark Stoneman (2021): M. Stoneman
- Bryan Stott (1952–1963): W. B. Stott
- Peter Stringer (1967–1969): P. M. Stringer
- Stephen Stuchbury (1978–1982): S. Stuchbury
- Frank Sugg (1883): F. H. Sugg
- Walter Sugg (1881): W. Sugg
- Harris Sullivan (2022): H. A. Sullivan
- Joseph Sullivan (1912): J. H. B. Sullivan
- Josh Sullivan (2021): J. R. Sullivan
- Herbert Sutcliffe (1919–1945): H. Sutcliffe
- Billy Sutcliffe (1948–1957): W. H. H. Sutcliffe
- Will Sutherland (2025): W. Sutherland
- Ian Swallow (1983–1989): I. G. Swallow
- Pieter Swanepoel (2003): P. J. Swanepoel

== T ==
- Thomas Tait (1898–1899): T. Tait
- John Tasker (1912–1913): J. Tasker
- Geoffry Tattersall (1905): G. Tattersall
- Jonny Tattersall (2013–2025): J. A. Tattersall
- Chris Taylor (2001–2009): C. R. Taylor
- Harry Taylor (1924–1925): H. Taylor
- Henry Taylor (1879–1881): H. S. Taylor
- John Taylor (1880–1881): J. Taylor
- Ken Taylor (1953–1968): K. Taylor
- Nick Taylor (1982–1983): N. S. Taylor
- Tom Taylor (1899–1906): T. L. Taylor
- Sachin Tendulkar (1992): S. R. Tendulkar
- Herbert Thewlis (1888): H. Thewlis
- John Thewlis junior (1879): John Thewlis junior
- John Thewlis senior (1863–1875): John Thewlis senior
- Jordan Thompson (2018–2025): J. A. Thompson
- Nick Thornicroft (2002–2007): N. D. Thornicroft
- Arthur Thornton (1881): A. Thornton
- George Thornton (1891): G. Thornton
- George Thorpe (1864): G. Thorpe
- Joseph Threapleton (1881): J. W. Threapleton
- Henry Tinsley (1890–1891): H. J. Tinsley
- Andrew Townsley (1974–1975): R. A. J. Townsley
- David Towse (1988): A. D. Towse
- Fred Trueman (1949–1968): F. S. Trueman
- John Tunnicliffe (1891–1907): J. Tunnicliffe
- Alban Turner (1910–1911): A. Turner
- Brian Turner (1960–1961): B. Turner
- Cyril Turner (1925–1946): C. Turner
- Francis Turner (1924): F. I. Turner
- Cec Tyson (1921): C. T. Tyson

== U ==
- Charles Ullathorne (1868–1875): C. E. Ullathorne
- George Ulyett (1873–1893): G. Ulyett
- John Usher (1888): J. Usher

== V ==
- Yash Vagadia (2024): Y. V. Vagadia
- Jack van Geloven (1955): J. van Geloven
- Michael Vaughan (1993–2009): M. P. Vaughan
- Harry Verelst (1868–1869): H. W. Verelst
- Hedley Verity (1930–1939): H. Verity

== W ==
- Abe Waddington (1919–1927): A. Waddington
- Saul Wade (1886–1890): S. Wade
- James Wainman (2014–2018): J. C. Wainman
- David Wainwright (2004–2011): D. J. Wainwright
- Ted Wainwright (1888–1902): E. Wainwright
- Walker Wainwright (1903–1905): W. Wainwright
- Matthew Waite (2014–2022): M. J. Waite
- William Wake (1880–1881): W. R. Wake
- Ashley Walker (1863–1870): A. Walker
- Clifford Walker (1947–1948): C. Walker
- Thomas Walker (1879–1880): T. Walker
- George Waller (1893–1896): G. Waller
- Lamplough Wallgate (1875–1878): L. Wallgate
- Herbert Walton (1893): H. Walton
- Albert Ward (1886): A. Ward
- Frederick Ward (1903): F. Ward
- Humphrey Ward (1920): H. P. Ward
- Thomas Wardall (1883–1894): T. A. Wardall
- Iain Wardlaw (2011–2013): I. Wardlaw
- Johnny Wardle (1945–1958): J. H. Wardle
- John Waring (1963–1966): J. S. Waring
- Seth Waring (1870): S. Waring
- Jared Warner (2019–2020): J. D. Warner
- Adam Warren (2005): A. C. Warren
- Irving Washington (1900–1902): W. A. I. Washington
- Haworth Watson (1908–1914): H. Watson
- Willie Watson (1939–1957): W. Watson
- Brian Waud (1863–1864): B. W. Waud
- Charles Webster (1863–1868): C. Webster
- Henry Webster (1868): H. H. Webster
- Lesroy Weekes (1994–2000): L. C. Weekes
- John West (1868–1876): J. West
- Alex Wharf (1994–1997): A. G. Wharf
- James Wharton (2020–2025): J. H. Wharton
- Francis Whatmough (1878–1882): F. J. Whatmough
- Charles Wheater (1880): C. H. Wheater
- Archibald White (1908–1920): A. W. White
- Craig White (1990–2009): C. White
- Jack White (2025): C. J. White
- John Whitehead (1945–1951): J. P. Whitehead
- Lees Whitehead (1889–1904): Lees Whitehead
- Luther Whitehead (1893): Luther Whitehead
- Peter Whiteley (1978–1982): J. P. Whiteley
- Charles Whiting (1914–1920): C. P. Whiting
- Joseph Whitwell (1890): J. F. Whitwell
- William Whitwell (1890): W. F. Whitwell
- Simon Widdup (1999–2001): S. Widdup
- David Wiese (2023): D. Wiese
- David Wigley (2001–2002): D. H. Wigley
- Anthony Wilkinson (1865–1868): A. J. A. Wilkinson
- Frank Wilkinson (1937–1939): F. Wilkinson
- Henry Wilkinson (1899–1905): H. Wilkinson
- Richard Wilkinson (1998): R. Wilkinson
- William Wilkinson (1903–1910): W. H. Wilkinson
- David Willey (2016–2021): D. J. Willey
- Billy Williams (1911–1919): A. C. Williams
- Kane Williamson (2013–2018): K. S. Williamson
- Benjamin B. Wilson (1906–1914): B. B. Wilson
- Clem Wilson (1896–1903): C. E. M. Wilson
- Don Wilson (1957–1974): D. Wilson
- Rockley Wilson (1899–1923): E. R. Wilson
- Geoffrey Wilson (1919–1924): G. Wilson
- George Wilson (1936–1939): G. A. Wilson
- John Wilson (1887–1893): J. Wilson
- Jack Wilson (1911–1912): J. P. Wilson
- Vic Wilson (1946–1962): J. V. Wilson
- Sam Wisniewski (2020): S. A. Wisniewski
- Arthur Wood (1927–1946): A. Wood
- Barry Wood (1964): B. Wood
- Christopher Wood (1959): C. H. Wood
- George Wood (1895): G. W. Wood
- Greg Wood (2007): G. L. Wood
- Hugh Wood (1879–1880): H. Wood
- J. H. Wood (1881) (Note: Wood played twice for Yorkshire in 1881. In his only first-class innings he opened the batting and scored 14 runs against Surrey at Huddersfield. He played in the return fixture against Surrey at The Oval, but did not bat and was recorded as 'absent hurt'. He played club cricket for Sowerby Bridge and for Yorkshire Colts. No other biographical details are known.)
- Matthew Wood (1997–2007): M. J. Wood
- Ronald Wood (1952–1956): R. Wood
- John Woodford (1968–1973): J. D. Woodford
- Frank Woodhead (1892–1894): F. E. Woodhead
- William Woodhouse (1884–1885): W. H. Woodhouse
- Alfred Wormald (1885–1891): A. Wormald
- William Worsley (1928–1929): W. A. Worsley
- Lewis Wrathmell (1886): L. F. Wrathmell
- Robert Wright (1877): R. Wright
- Thomas Wright (1919): T. J. Wright

== Y ==
- Norman Yardley (1936–1955): N. W. D. Yardley
- James Yeadon (1888): J. Yeadon
- Younis Khan (2007): Younis Khan

== See also ==
- List of Sheffield Cricket Club players
- List of Yorkshire County Cricket Club captains
