= List of Yorkshire cricket captains =

Yorkshire County Cricket Club was officially founded on 8 January 1863 and its team was elevated to first-class status in the same year. It is one of eighteen county teams in England and Wales that play first-class cricket. The player appointed club captain leads the team in all fixtures except if unavailable.

- 1863–1872 Roger Iddison – champions 1867, 1870; shared 1869 (note that these titles are unofficial)
- 1873–1873 Joseph Rowbotham
- 1874–1874 Luke Greenwood
- 1875–1875 Joseph Rowbotham (second term)
- 1876–1877 Ephraim Lockwood
- 1878–1882 Tom Emmett
- 1883–1910 Lord Hawke – champions 1893, 1896, 1898, 1900, 1901, 1902, 1905, 1908
- 1911–1911 Everard Radcliffe
- 1912–1918 Archibald White – champions 1912
- 1919–1921 Cecil Burton – champions 1919
- 1922–1924 Geoffrey Wilson – champions 1922, 1923, 1924
- 1925–1927 Arthur Lupton – champions 1925
- 1928–1929 Sir William Worsley
- 1930–1930 Alan Barber
- 1931–1932 Frank Greenwood – champions 1931, 1932
- 1933–1947 Brian Sellers – champions 1933, 1935, 1937, 1938, 1939, 1946
- 1948–1955 Norman Yardley – shared title 1949
- 1956–1957 Billy Sutcliffe
- 1958–1959 Ronnie Burnet – champions 1959
- 1960–1962 Vic Wilson – champions 1960, 1962
- 1963–1970 Brian Close – champions 1963, 1966, 1967, 1968
- 1971–1978 Geoff Boycott
- 1979–1980 John Hampshire
- 1981–1982 Chris Old
- 1982–1983 Ray Illingworth
- 1984–1986 David Bairstow
- 1987–1989 Phil Carrick
- 1990–1995 Martyn Moxon
- 1996–2001 David Byas – champions 2001
- 2002–2002 Darren Lehmann
- 2003–2003 Anthony McGrath
- 2004–2006 Craig White
- 2007–2008 Darren Gough
- 2009–2009 Anthony McGrath (second term)
- 2010–2016 Andrew Gale – champions 2014, 2015
- 2017-2018 Gary Ballance
- 2018–2022 Steven Patterson
- 2023–2024 Shan Masood
- 2025 - present Jonny Bairstow

== See also ==
- List of Yorkshire County Cricket Club players
