= Herbert Walton =

Herbert Walton may refer to:

- Herbert Walton (cricketer) (1868–1930), English cricketer
- Herbert Walton (priest) (died 1955), Anglican priest
- Herbert James Walton (1869–1938), English surgeon and naturalist
