= Oyston =

Oyston is a surname. Notable people with the surname include:

- Owen Oyston (born 1934), English businessman and owner of Blackpool F.C.
  - His son, Karl Oyston (born 1968), former chairman of Blackpool F.C.
- Charles Oyston (1869–1942), English cricketer
- Petra Oyston, British scientist
