= The Light of Western Stars =

The Light of Western Stars may refer to:

- The Light of Western Stars (novel), a 1914 Western novel by Zane Grey
- The Light of Western Stars (1918 film), directed by Charles Swickard
- The Light of Western Stars (1925 film), directed by William K. Howard
- The Light of Western Stars (1930 film), directed by Otto Brower and Edwin H. Knopf
- The Light of Western Stars (1940 film), directed by Lesley Selander
