= Arthur Dobson =

Arthur Dobson may refer to:

- Sir Arthur Dudley Dobson (1841–1934), surveyor best known for discovering Arthur's Pass in 1864
- Arthur Dobson (cricketer) (1854–1932), English cricketer
- Arthur Dobson (footballer) (1893–1918), English footballer
- Arthur Dobson (racing driver) (1914–80), English racing driver
