= Thomas Pride (disambiguation) =

Thomas Pride (died 1658) was a parliamentarian general in the English Civil War.

Thomas Pride may also refer to:

- Thomas Pride (cricketer) (1864–1919), English cricketer
- Thomas Pride (VC) (1835–1893), English recipient of the Victoria Cross
- Thomas Pride (fl.1378–1414), MP for Shrewsbury (UK Parliament constituency)
