= Andrew Dalton =

Andrew Dalton or Andy Dalton may refer to:

- Andrew Dalton (countertenor) (born 1950), Australian countertenor
- Andrew Dalton (cricketer) (born 1947), English first-class cricketer
- Andy Dalton (born 1987), American professional football quarterback
- Andy Dalton (rugby union) (born 1951), New Zealand rugby union player

== See also ==
- The Andrew Dalton School, private coeducational college preparatory school in New York City
