= Darnton =

Darnton is an English surname. Therefore, the most likely origins are either (1) related to some place (2) related to some occupation (3) perhaps indicative of some relationship.

The word, and its components, Darn - ton, indicate that (2) and (3) are unlikely. Therefore, most ancestors are likely to come from the same place.

The -ton at the end is one of the most common endings in English place names. Its meaning can be such as town, village, hamlet, farmstead, enclosure, fence or hedge. Several writers suggest this has become an enclosed village or farmstead. One writer suggests that where the prefix to -ton is a name, the -ton is more likely to refer to an enclosed farmstead.

Darn- is more difficult, and most sources seem to favour it being an abbreviation of some kind.

An analysis of key life events shows that most have occurred in North England, with South County Durham and North Yorkshire having the highest frequencies. The place with the largest number of life events we can trace since 1450 is Staindrop in South County Durham. Therefore, the answer probably lies there.

Dar(li)n(g)ton

Darnton may be an abbreviation of Darlington. This is the explicit explanation given in Longstaffe's History of Darlington (2nd edition, 1909).

"In the earliest records, however, the name [Darlington] occurs as Dearnington, Dernington, Derningtune, forms correctly contracted in Darnton and Dernton." p3.

At pp 5–6, Longstaffe gives several references to specific people with the name Darnton.

According to Ekwall (4th ed., 1960) Darlington is 'The Tun of Deornop's people'.

Dar(ri)n(g)ton

Barber (British Family Names, 894) refers Darnton to Darrington in North Yorkshire (near Pontefract).

Ekwall has Darrington as 'The Tun of Dægheard's people', with a Domesday Book reference to the name Darni(n)tone.

Johnson has Darrington as 'Town, village, of Deorna'.

J. Horsfall Turner (Yorkshire Place Names or toponymy as recorded in the Yorkshire Domesday Book 1086:...) published in Bingley date unknown but in the range 1888–1920 in discussing etymology has 'Darn' as a Celtic derivative for water or river, Dearne as bright water, swift, and he indicates Darnin and Darni as original owners. (pp254–5)

Darnton Rebus

John Darnton, 30th Abbot of Fountains Abbey, was responsible for much work including the West Window. Over that window is a stone corbel carved as a rebus (a representation of a name by pictures or figures) for John Darnton. This Darnton Rebus is now very badly corroded, probably through pollution, but it was distinct early this century. The construction and interpretation of this rebus is that the bird is a "Dern' and the barrel held by the bird is a 'ton'. An illustration of the Darnton Rebus can be found at the principal Darnton website (see below).

The most comprehensive information about the Darnton name, and a collection of information about people who have had the name, can be found at the principal Darnton website. The original information on this page about the origin of the name Darnton was contributed by the author of the material on the Darnton website.

The surname Darnton may refer to:

- Bernard Darnton (born 1972), New Zealand politician
- Christian Darnton (1905–1981), a.k.a. Baron von Schunck, British composer
- Byron Darnton (1897–1942), American journalist; war correspondent
- John Darnton (born 1941), American journalist, son of Byron Darnton
- Leo Darnton (1890–1944), English tenor in Australia
- Robert Darnton (born 1939), American historian, son of Byron Darnton
- Thomas Darnton (1836–1874), English cricketer
