= Ryan Gibson =

Ryan Gibson can refer to:

- Ryan Gibson (Australian cricketer) (born 1993), Australian cricketer
- Ryan Gibson (English cricketer) (born 1996), English cricketer
