= Threapleton =

Threapleton is a surname. Notable people with the surname include:

- Jim Threapleton (born 1973), British film director, father of Mia
- Joseph Threapleton (1857–1918), English cricketer
- Mia Threapleton (born 2000), British actor, daughter of Jim
- Pauline Threapleton-Wainwright (born 1933), British hurdler
