= Francis Baines =

Francis Baines may refer to:

- Francis Baines (cricketer) (1864–1948), English cricketer
- Francis Baines (Jesuit) (1648–1710), English Jesuit
- Francis Baines (musician) (1917–1999), British composer and double-bass player
