= William Woodhouse =

William Woodhouse may refer to:

- William Woodhouse (cricketer) (1856–1938), English cricketer
- William Woodhouse (artist) ((1857–1939), English artist
- William John Woodhouse (1866–1937), English classical scholar and author
- William Woodhouse (naval officer) (before 1517–1564), English naval officer and MP for Great Yarmouth, Norfolk and Norwich
- William Woodhouse (MP for Aldeburgh), MP for Aldeburgh 1604-11 and 1614-21

== See also ==
- William Wodehouse, MP for Norfolk in 1734
