= Charles Grimshaw =

Charles Grimshaw may refer to:

- Charles Grimshaw (cricketer) (1880–1947), played for Yorkshire
- Charles Grimshaw (footballer), active in Belgium
