= Neil Nicholson =

Neil Nicholson may refer to:

- Neil Nicholson (cricketer), English cricketer
- Neil Nicholson (ice hockey), Canadian ice hockey player
- Neil Nicholson (swimmer), British swimmer
