= William Blackburn (disambiguation) =

William Blackburn (1750–1790) was an English architect.

William Blackburn may also refer to:

- W. Jasper Blackburn (1820–1899), American politician
- William M. Blackburn (1828–1898), American university president
- William Blackburn (cricketer) (1888–1941), English cricketer
- William Blackburn (footballer) (1911–1979), English footballer
