= Deyes =

Deyes is a surname. Notable people with the surname include:

- Alfie Deyes (born 1993), English vlogger and writer
- George Deyes (1879–1963), English cricketer

== See also ==
- Reyes (name)
