= Arthur Rhodes (disambiguation) =

Arthur Rhodes (born 1969) is an American baseball player.

Arthur Rhodes may also refer to:

- Arthur Rhodes (cricketer) (1906–1957), English cricketer
- Arthur Rhodes (politician) (1859–1922), New Zealand politician
- Arthur Rhodes (footballer), English footballer
