= Haworth (disambiguation) =

Haworth is a village and tourist attraction in the English county of West Yorkshire, best known for its association with the Brontë sisters.

Haworth may also refer to:

== Places ==
- Haworth, New Jersey, a borough
- Haworth, Oklahoma, a town
- Haworth Mesa, Antarctica
- Haworth (crater), on the Moon
- 1824 Haworth, an asteroid

== Businesses ==
- Haworth (company), an office furniture manufacturer headquartered in Holland, Michigan
- Haworth Press, publisher of scholarly, academic and trade books, and academic journals
- Haworth Art Gallery, Accrington, Lancashire, England

== Other uses ==
- Haworth (surname)
- Haworth baronets, a title in the Baronetage of the United Kingdom
- Haworth Watson (1880–1951), English cricketer
- Haworth projection, in chemistry
- Haworth's, a novel by Frances Hodgson Burnett

== See also ==
- Haworthia, a genus of plants in the family Asphodelaceae, named after Adrian Hardy Haworth
- Hayworth
- Howarth
