= Albert Farrar =

English cricketer

Albert Farrar (29 April 1884 – 25 December 1954) was an English first-class cricketer, who played one match for Yorkshire County Cricket Club in 1906.

Born in Brighouse, Yorkshire, England, Farrar scored two runs in his only innings and did not bowl in the game against Somerset at Fartown, Huddersfield, which Yorkshire won by an innings. Like comrades George Hirst and John Tunnicliffe, he lost his wicket attempting to force the pace against the left-arm slows of Arthur Bailey. He did, however, pick up a catch to dismiss Fred Lee off the bowling of Wilfred Rhodes.

He also appeared for Yorkshire Second XI from 1902 to 1910, and R.W. Frank's XI in 1906. Farrar was a professional rugby league footballer with Rochdale Hornets, and also kept the Albion Inn pub at Brighouse.

Farrar died in December 1954 in Salterhebble, Halifax, Yorkshire.

Albert was known as 'Alty' Farrar to his family and friends. His first wife Lily Short died giving birth to his first son was Harry Farrar 21 April 1908. He later married Florence Lees, known as 'Florrie', who he had a second son George Farrar who also ran the Albion Pub in Brighouse.
