= The Light of Western Stars (1930 film) =

1930 film

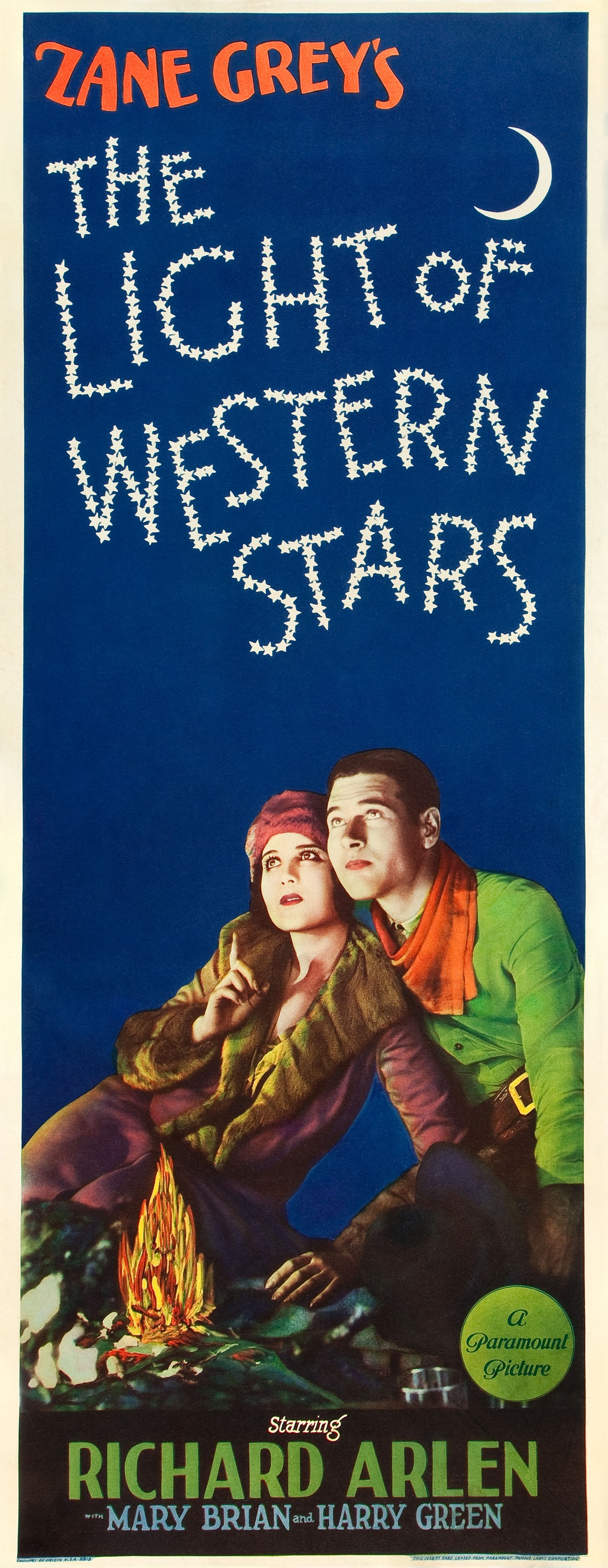
- Directed by: Otto Brower; Edwin H. Knopf
- Written by: Grover Jones; William Slavens McNutt
- Based on: The Light of Western Stars by Zane Grey
- Starring: Richard Arlen; Mary Brian
- Cinematography: Charles Lang
- Edited by: Jane Loring
- Music by: Charles Midgley
- Distributed by: Paramount Pictures
- Release date: April 19, 1930
- Running time: 70 minutes
- Country: United States
- Language: English

The Light of Western Stars is a 1930 American pre-Code Western produced and distributed by Paramount Pictures. It had two directors, Otto Brower and Edwin H. Knopf. This film is the third filming of Zane Grey's 1914 novel, The Light of Western Stars. Richard Arlen and Mary Brian starred. Previously filmed by Paramount as a silent in 1925.

The film was the first adaptation of Grey's works to be made with sound. Star Richard Arlen sang in this, his second Western film, performing "a cowboy chantie, accompanied by an harmonica and a jews-harp."

== Cast ==
- Richard Arlen as Dick Bailey
- Mary Brian as Ruth Hammond
- Regis Toomey as Bob Drexell
- Fred Kohler as H. W. Stack
- Guy Oliver as Sheriff Grip Jarvis
- George Chandler as Slig Whalen
- William Le Maire as Griff Meeker
- Lew Meehan as Rifleman
- Syd Saylor as Square Toe
