= Joseph Frank (cricketer) =

English cricketer

Joseph Frank (17 December 1857 – 22 October 1940) was an English amateur first-class cricketer, who played one match for Yorkshire County Cricket Club in 1881, against I Zingari at North Marine Road Ground, Scarborough. He also played first-class cricket for the Gentlemen of England in 1883 and 1886, the Gentlemen in 1883, the Rest of England in 1883, plus A. J. Webbe's XI in 1887.

Born in Helmsley, Yorkshire, England, Frank came from a cricketing family. His elder brother Benjamin, and his father, played club cricket, with Joseph initially playing with Duncombe Park C.C. In total he played in seven first-class matches. His bowling was fast, but his action was suspect, and his biggest impact in the sport came when he played for the Scarborough & District against the Australians in 1880, when he damaged Fred Spofforth's finger an injury that prevented him from playing in the subsequent Test match at The Oval. His cousin, Robert Frank, of Pickering played nineteen times for Yorkshire, and captained the Yorkshire Second XI between 1900 and 1914. Joseph Frank later became a timber merchant.

A right arm fast medium bowler, he took nine wickets at 28.66 with a best of 3 for 70 against Oxford University. Batting left-handed, he scored 198 runs at 16.5 with a top score of 46 against a Nottinghamshire and Lancashire combined side.

Frank was educated in Ripon, North Yorkshire and died there in October 1940, aged 82.
