= George Wilson (Yorkshire cricketer) =

English cricketer

George Arthur Wilson (2 February 1916 – 24 September 2002) was an English amateur first-class cricketer, who played fifteen matches for Yorkshire County Cricket Club between 1936 and 1939.

Born in Whitkirk, Leeds, Yorkshire, England, Wilson scored 352 runs at 17.60 and, bowling slow left-arm, took one wicket for 138. His highest score of 55 not out came against Northamptonshire, at North Marine Road Ground, Scarborough in 1938, when he added an unbroken 84 for the sixth wicket with his captain, Brian Sellers.

Wilson played his early cricket with Whitkirk C.C., and subsequently graduated to the Bradford League with Saltaire C.C. and Windhill C.C. He was a businessman in Leeds, before retiring to Oxford.

He died in September 2002 in Oxford, aged 86.
