= Herbert Sedgwick =

English cricketer

Herbert Amos Sedgwick (8 April 1883 – 28 December 1957) was an English first-class cricketer, who played three matches for Yorkshire County Cricket Club in 1906.

Born in Richmond, Yorkshire, England, Sedgwick was a right arm fast bowler, who took five wickets for eight runs against Worcestershire. Overall, he took 16 wickets at 20.43, at the strike rate of a wicket every twenty six balls. He scored 53 runs, with a best of 34 against Lancashire in the Roses Match, at an average of 17.66. He took two catches in the field. His other appearances came against the West Indian tourists.

He also played for the Yorkshire Second XI (1907–7), Staffordshire (1911–1928), R. W. Frank's XI (1906) and Minor Counties North (1923).

Sedgwick died in December 1957 in Stoke-on-Trent, Staffordshire, England.
