= Paul Anderson (cricketer) =

English cricketer (born 1966)

Paul Anderson (born Paul Napier Anderson, 28 April 1966, Driffield, Yorkshire, England) is an English cricketer, who played one match for Yorkshire County Cricket Club in 1988, against the Sri Lanka touring team at Headingley on 10 August 1988. He took one wicket for 47, opening the bowling and bowled their captain, Ranjan Madugalle for 48, and caught their opener, Brendon Kuruppu, off the bowling of Paul Booth for 19. Anderson scored a duck at number 11 in his only first-class innings.

He batted right-handed and bowled right-arm medium pace. He played two Yorkshire Second XI matches in 1987, and thirteen in 1988. He also appeared for Warwickshire under-25s.

Paul Anderson set up Indian restaurant Indigo Napier in 2008 based in Hawke's Bay, New Zealand. In August 2023, Paul sold Indigo.

Paul now resides in Wansford where he owns the Wansford Trout Inn.
