= Joseph Mounsey =

English cricketer

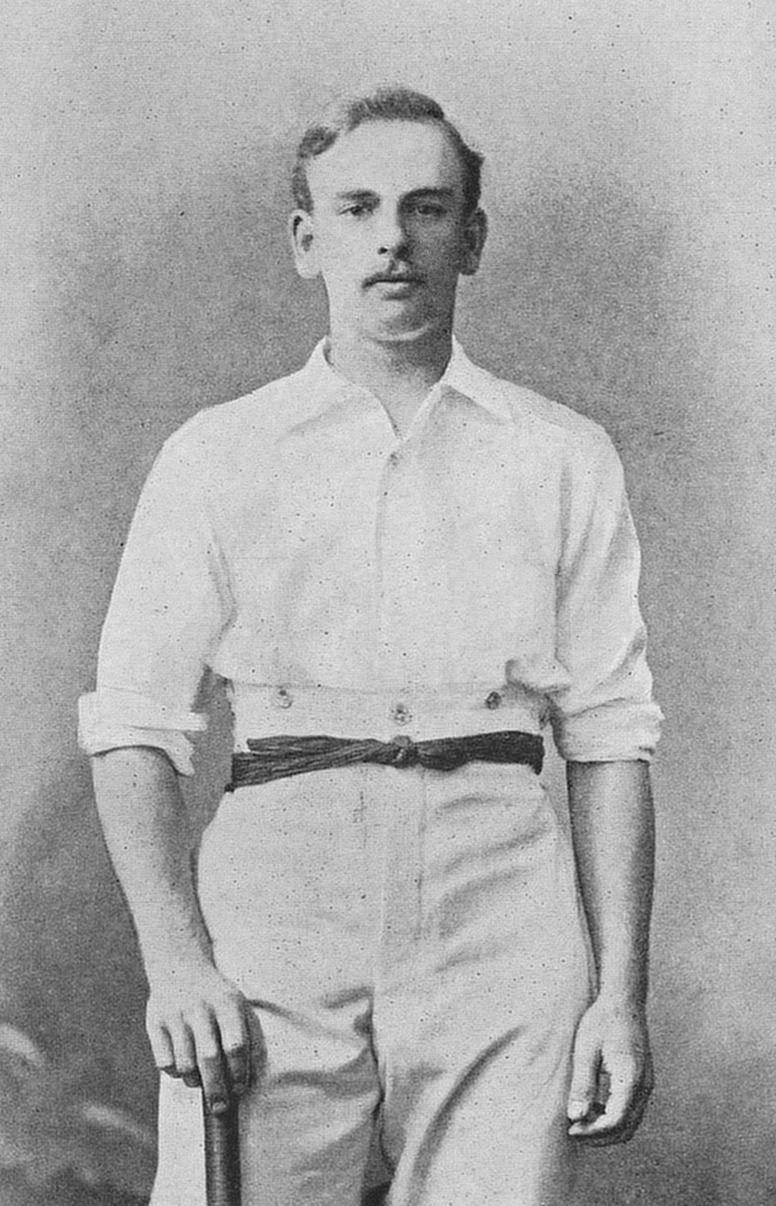

Personal information
- Full name: Joseph Thomas Mounsey
- Born: 30 August 1871; Heeley, Sheffield, Yorkshire, England
- Died: 6 April 1949 (aged 77); Godalming, Surrey, England
- Batting: Right-handed
- Bowling: Right-arm medium

Domestic team information
- Years: Team
- 1891–1897: Yorkshire

Career statistics
Competition	First-class
Matches	95
Runs scored	1,963
Batting average	15.57
100s/50s	0/7
Top score	64
Balls bowled	1,050
Wickets	13
Bowling average	36.61
5 wickets in innings	0
10 wickets in match	0
Best bowling	3/58
Catches/stumpings	47/–
- Source: CricketArchive, 26 October 2012

Joseph Thomas Mounsey (30 August 1871 – 6 April 1949) was an English first-class cricketer who played 92 games for Yorkshire County Cricket Club between 1891 and 1897. He also played a first-class match for 'XI of Yorkshire' in 1894, and in non first-class games for Yorkshire Colts, Yorkshire Second XI, and Yorkshire.

Born in Heeley, Sheffield, Yorkshire, England, Mounsey was a right-handed batsman who scored 1,963 runs at 15.57, with a top score of 64 against Hampshire. He took 13 wickets at 36.61, with his right arm medium pacers, with a best performance of 3 for 58.

At the end of his first-class playing career with Yorkshire, Mounsey became cricket coach at Charterhouse School, Godalming, Surrey.

He died in April 1949 in Ockford Ridge, Godalming.
