= Edmund Maude =

English cricketer

Edmund Maude (31 December 1839 – 2 July 1876) was an English amateur first-class cricketer, who played two matches for Yorkshire County Cricket Club in 1866.

Born in Middleton, Leeds, Yorkshire, England, Maude made his debut against Cambridgeshire at Great Horton Road, Bradford and scored 1 and 16. His last game, at the same venue against Nottinghamshire, was ruined by rain washing out the first two days. Nottinghamshire scored 103 for 6 in 95 overs on the final day, depriving Maude of another chance to bat in first-class cricket.

Maude died in July 1876 in Headingley, Leeds, aged 36.
