= Christopher Pickles =

English cricketer (born 1966)

Christopher Stephen Pickles (born 30 January 1966) is an English first-class cricketer, who played for Yorkshire County Cricket Club between 1985 and 1992.

Pickles was born in Mirfield, Yorkshire. In 58 first-class matches, Pickles scored 1,336 runs at 24.29, with a highest score of 66 against Somerset. He scored seven fifties in all, and took 24 catches. He took 83 first-class wickets with his right arm medium pace, at 43.83, with a best of 4 for 40 against Northamptonshire, his only first-class four wicket haul.

In 71 one day matches he took 63 wickets at 47.88, with a best analysis of 4 for 36 against Somerset. He scored 375 runs with a best score of 37 not out against Warwickshire.

He also played for Northamptonshire Under-25s from 1982 to 1983, Yorkshire Under-25s from 1984 to 1987 and for the Yorkshire Second XI from 1984 to 1992.
