= Spencer Allen =

English cricketer

Spencer Allen (20 December 1893 – 9 October 1978) was an English amateur first-class cricketer, who played only one game for Yorkshire County Cricket Club in 1924. With the bat he scored 8 runs at an average of 4.00, with a highest score of 6. With the ball he took two wickets for 116.

Allen was born in Halifax, Yorkshire, England, and played as an amateur. He took six wickets for six runs for Yorkshire Second XI v Lincolnshire in 1924, and put on 224 for the first wicket for Leeds v Whitwood Colliery in 1934. Allen also played as a professional for Queensbury C.C. in the Bradford League.

Later as a schoolmaster, he taught at Leeds Modern School, before retiring to Ilkley in 1968.

Spencer Allen died in Bradford, Yorkshire.
