= Eliot Callis =

English cricketer (born 1994)

Personal information
- Born: 8 November 1994 (age 32); Doncaster, South Yorkshire, England
- Batting: Right-handed
- Bowling: Right-arm leg break
- Role: Batsman

Domestic team information
- Years: Team
- 2014–2017: Yorkshire
- First-class debut: 26 June 2016 Yorkshire v Pakistan A
- Only List A: 31 July 2014 Yorkshire v Sri Lanka A

Career statistics
Competition	FC	LA
Matches	2	1
Runs scored	131	10
Batting average	65.50	10.00
100s/50s	0/1	0/0
Top score	84	10
Catches/stumpings	1/–	0/–
- Source: ESPNcricinfo, 4 April 2017

Eliot Callis (born 8 November 1994) is an English cricketer who made three appearances for Yorkshire between 2014 and 2017. He is a right-handed batsman and a right-arm leg break bowler. After being released by Yorkshire at the end of the 2017 season, he has played for Bedfordshire and Buckinghamshire in the Minor Counties Championship.

Callis has also played for High Wycombe Cricket Club in the Home Counties Premier Cricket League since 2018. He finished the 2021 season as the league's top run scorer, contributing heavily towards High Wycombe's first title win since 2015.

In 2022, he represented an England National Counties XI at the 10-over European Cricket Championship.
