= The Light of Western Stars (1925 film) =

1925 film

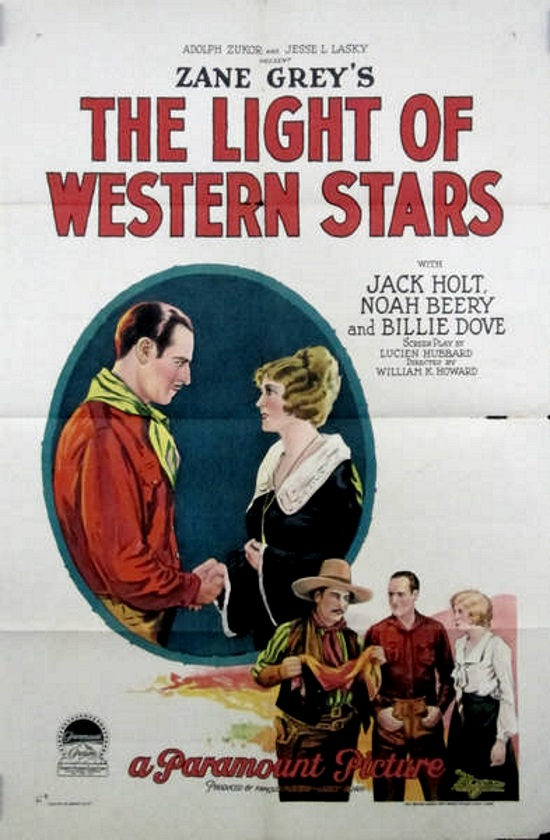
- Directed by: William K. Howard
- Written by: George C. Hull (adaptation); Lucien Hubbard (adaptation)
- Based on: The Light of Western Stars by Zane Grey
- Produced by: Adolph Zukor; Jesse Lasky
- Cinematography: Lucien Andriot
- Distributed by: Paramount Pictures
- Release date: June 22, 1925
- Running time: 90 minutes; 7 reels
- Country: United States
- Language: Silent (English intertitles)

The Light of Western Stars is a 1925 American silent Western film directed by William K. Howard and starring Jack Holt, Billie Dove, and Noah Beery. The film was based on a 1914 Zane Grey novel and had been filmed before in 1918.

== Plot ==
As described in a film magazine review, Gene Stewart, a dashing young cowboy who has vowed at the climax of a revel to marry the first young woman he sees on the incoming limited, forces Madeline to go through a marriage ceremony. He is panic stricken when he discovers that she is the sister of his friend Al Hammond. In a shooting affair in El Cajon, Gene assists Al in escaping from the sheriff, and Al asks Gene to look after his sister. Brand, leader of a ruffian band, suddenly learns that the governor has sent the police to clean them out. Madeline is saved during a raid on the ranch from being abducted by Brand when Gene rushes up to the ranch. The outlaws capture Gene and Al. Brand tells Madeline that she must decide whether Gene or her brother will live, the other to take the "walk of death." She selects Gene, but Brand decides to set Al free and kill Gene. Just as this is about to happen, the police after a pitched battle capture the bandits.

== Cast ==
- Jack Holt as Gene Stewart
- Billie Dove as Madeline Hammond
- Noah Beery as Brand
- Alma Bennett as Bonita
- William Scott as Al Hammond
- George Nichols as Billy Stillwell
- Mark Hamilton as Monty Price
- Bob Perry as Nelse (credited as Robert Perry)
- Eugene Pallette as Stub (credited as Gene Pallette)

== Production ==
Exteriors for The Light of Western Stars were filmed on location in the Mojave Desert and in the Superstition Mountains.

== Preservation ==
With no prints of The Light of Western Stars located in any film archives, it is a lost film.

== See also ==
- An excerpt of the film is seen in the 1931 Paramount promotional film The House That Shadows Built.
- The Light of Western Stars (1930)
