= James Yeadon =

English cricketer

James Yeadon (10 December 1861 – 30 May 1914) was an English first-class cricketer, who played three times for Yorkshire County Cricket Club in 1888.

Born in Yeadon, near Leeds, Yorkshire, England, Yeadon was a right-handed batsman, and a wicket-keeper, who scored forty one runs in six innings with the bat, at an average of 10.25, with a high score of 22. He took five catches and made three stumpings.

Yeadon died in his home town of Yeadon in May 1914, aged 52.
