= Lamplough Wallgate =

English cricketer

Lamplough Wallgate (12 November 1849 – 9 May 1887) was an English amateur first-class cricketer, who played three first-class matches for Yorkshire County Cricket Club. Wallgate made his debut in 1875, and his final appearance was in 1878.

Wallgate was born in Norton-on-Derwent in the East Riding of Yorkshire (now in North Yorkshire), England, and scored nine first-class runs, and took one wicket for seventeen with his round arm, right-handed, bowling. He made his debut against the Marylebone Cricket Club (MCC), in a drawn, end of season game, at North Marine Road Ground, Scarborough in September 1885. Wallgate opened the Yorkshire first innings, and scored three runs.

His only appearance in the County Championship came almost two years later, in August 1887, against Middlesex at Bramall Lane, Sheffield. Wallgate was dismissed for a duck in Yorkshire's 251, and the game was drawn before he had the chance to bat again.

Wallgate also played in two matches for Yorkshire against Scotland at The Grange, Edinburgh in 1878. Batting at number three, he scored six first-class runs in Yorkshire's first innings, and took a catch off the bowling of Tom Emmett. As this match finished a day early, a one-day game was arranged which Scotland won, after they passed Yorkshire's paltry 57, in which Wallgate top scored with 14, the only Yorkshire batsman score in double figures.

Wallgate died, aged 37, in May 1887 in Harrogate, Yorkshire.
