= William Micklethwait =

English cricketer

William Henry Micklethwait (13 December 1885 – 7 October 1947) was an English amateur first-class cricketer, who played one match for Yorkshire County Cricket Club in 1911.

Born in Rotherham, Yorkshire, England, Micklethwait was a left-handed batsman who scored 44 batting at number five in his only first-class innings, against the Indian tourists at The Circle, Kingston upon Hull. David Denton and Schofield Haigh scored hundreds, as Yorkshire ran out winners by an innings and 43 runs.

Micklethwait also played for the Yorkshire Second XI (1908–1911), Mexborough and District (1906), Sheffield and District (1911) and Yorkshire Cricket Council (1912).

He died in October 1947 at Broom Grange, Rotherham, aged 61.
