= Alexander Corbett =

English cricketer

Alexander Melvin Corbett (25 November 1855 – 7 October 1934) was an English first-class cricketer, who played one match for Yorkshire County Cricket Club.

Born in Aston Common, Rotherham, Yorkshire, England, Corbett went through his first-class career of one match without scoring a run or bowling a ball, but he took one catch. He played against the W. G. Grace led Gloucestershire at Bramall Lane, Sheffield in July 1881, a match won by the visitors by five wickets.

A pattern maker by trade, he played his club cricket with Elsecar C.C.

He died in Rotherham in October 1934, aged 78.
