= Isaac Bottomley =

English cricketer

Isaac Henry Bottomley (9 April 1855 – 23 April 1922) was an English first-class cricketer, who played nine times for Yorkshire County Cricket Club between 1878 and 1890.

Born in Spring Hall, Shelf, West Riding of Yorkshire, England, Bottomley was a right-handed batsman. He scored 166 runs at 13.83 with the best of 32, and took one wicket, in the Roses Match of 1879 at Bramall Lane, with his roundarm fast bowling at a cost of 75. He took four wickets in four balls while playing for Low Moor C.C. in 1883.

He lived in Ovenden before moving to Morecambe, and died in Heysham, Lancashire in April 1922. His funeral took place at Shelf Church.
