= Geoffry Tattersall =

English cricketer

Geoffry Tattersall (21 April 1882 – 29 June 1972 (aged 90)) was an English amateur first-class cricketer, who played one match for Yorkshire County Cricket Club in 1905. He also played for the Yorkshire Second XI from 1906 to 1910.

Born in Ripon, Yorkshire, England, Tattersall was a right hand batsman, who scored 26 and a duck in a drawn match against Sussex at Headingley.

Tattersall died in June 1972 in Harrogate, Yorkshire, at the age of 90.
