= Joseph Dawes =

English cricketer

Joseph Dawes (14 February 1836 – unknown) was an English first-class cricketer, who played for five matches for Yorkshire County Cricket Club in 1885, and one for the North of England against the South of England in 1886.

Born in Hallam, Sheffield, Yorkshire, England, Dawes was a right-handed batsman, who scored 104 first-class runs at 11.55, with a best of 28* against Kent, and he took six wickets with his right arm, roundarm, fast bowling at 39.33, with a best of 2 for 24 in the same drawn match at the Bat and Ball Ground in Gravesend. He was coach at Eton College from 1863 to 1866, and then engaged in a similar capacity with the Royal Artillery at Woolwich up to 1876.

The date of his death is not recorded.
