= Frank Woodhead =

English cricketer

Frank Ellis Woodhead (29 May 1868 – 25 August 1943) was an English amateur first-class cricketer, who played five games of first-class cricket for Cambridge University and Yorkshire from 1889 to 1894.

== Biography ==
Woodhead was born in Woodthorpe, Huddersfield, Yorkshire, a son of Joseph Woodhead. He was educated at St John's College, Cambridge. He was a right-handed batsman and right-arm medium-pace bowler, who achieved little success, although he retired with the bowling average of 4.00, as his solitary spell of twenty balls gained him the wicket with only four runs conceded. In ten innings, he made a total of 57 runs, with a best score of 18, for an average of 5.70.

In his only appearance for his University, he recorded a pair in a heavy defeat against Surrey at The Oval in a two-day match on 13 and 14 June 1889. He did take his only first-class wicket in this match, bowling J.W. Sharpe for a duck. His next match was for Yorkshire against Cambridge University at Fenner's in 1893, when he compiled five and eight runs when opening the innings, in a low scoring match won by Cambridge by twenty seven runs. In the same year, he turned out against the touring Australians at Bramall Lane, Sheffield, but was dismissed for three and eight runs at the top of the order.

In 1892, he played for Yorkshire in a non-first-class, two-day fixture, against the then Minor Counties outfit Durham at Thrum Hall, Halifax, making eight runs in Yorkshire's first innings, and then 15 not out from number three in the order, to steer them to a seven wicket victory.

His last season, in 1894, saw him feature in a two-day loss against Leicestershire in a friendly first-class match when, demoted in the order to number seven, he scored eight and a duck, and his swan song came against his old University when Yorkshire lost by 119 runs. Woodhead did post his career best score of 18 in his final first-class innings, before he was bowled by Burrough.

Woodhead died, aged 75, in August 1943 in Huddersfield.
