= Stephen Silvester =

English cricketer (born 1951)

Stephen Silvester (born 12 March 1951 in Hull, Yorkshire, England) is an English former first-class cricketer who played six matches for Yorkshire County Cricket Club in 1976 and 1977. He also made appearances for Northumberland (1979), Warwickshire Second XI (1971), Derbyshire Second XI (1973) and the Yorkshire Second XI (1976–1978).

A right arm bowler, he took 12 wickets at 26.08 with a best of 4 for 86 against Lancashire. He scored 30 runs at an average of 10.00, with a best of 14 against Derbyshire. He also took two catches in the field.

In later life, Silvester worked as a PE teacher at South Hunsley School, in Melton, East Riding of Yorkshire.
