= Petra Oyston =

British researcher

Petra Claire Farquhar Oyston OBE
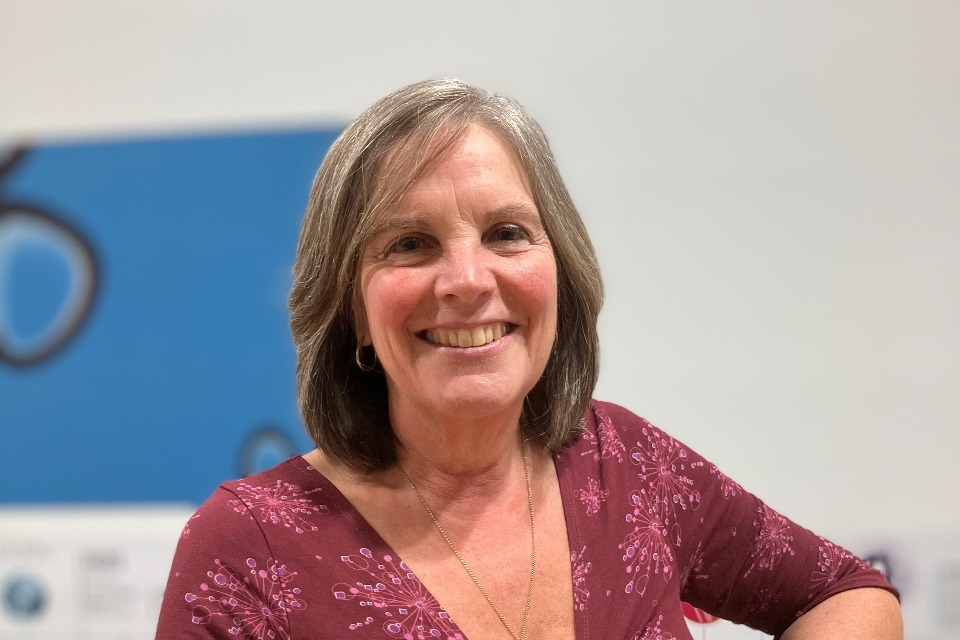
- Oyston in 2024
- Education: University of Manchester
- Scientific career
- Workplaces: University of Florida; Defence Science and Technology Laboratory

Petra Claire Farquhar Oyston is a British researcher and Defence Science and Technology Laboratory Fellow. She has developed the UK's engineering and synthetic biology research programme. She was made an Officer of the Order of the British Empire in the 2025 New Year's Honours.

== Early life and education ==
Oyston was born in High Wycombe and grew up in Whitley Bay in North East England. Her mother was a teacher and her father was a civil engineer. She studied at the University of Manchester, where she earned an undergraduate and PhD in microbiology. Her doctorate looked at anaerobic bacteria in the gut that can cause sepsis. She moved to the University of Florida as a postdoctoral researcher, where she studied streptococcus mutans, bacteria that give rise to tooth decay.

== Research and career ==
Oyston has worked at Porton Down in the Defence Science and Technology Laboratory since 1992. She specialises in the area of chemical, biological and radiological research. She is interested in the study of pathogens, the evolution of bacteria and the development of medical strategies to protect public health.

At Porton Down, Oyston developed anti bio-warfare vaccines, including vaccines to prevent bacterial infection and the spread of plague. She has used synthetic biology to develop armour materials. For example, she developed a genetically modified E. coli that could be used to toughen ceramics and showed that it was possible to turn barnacle genes into powerful adhesives. The Porton Down department have responded to international chemical situations, including the 2001 anthrax attacks and the poisoning of Sergei and Yulia Skripal.

== Awards and honours ==
- 2018 Women In Defence Award for Innovation
- 2024 Ministry of Defence CSA Commendations
- 2025 Elected to the Order of the British Empire

== Selected publications ==
- Petra C F Oyston; Anders Sjostedt; Richard W Titball (1 December 2004). "Tularaemia: bioterrorism defence renews interest in Francisella tularensis". Nature Reviews Microbiology. 2 (12): 967–978. doi:10.1038/nrmicro1045. ISSN 1740-1534. PMID 15550942. Wikidata Q35954270.
- Sarah E Maddocks; Petra C F Oyston (1 December 2008). "Structure and function of the LysR-type transcriptional regulator (LTTR) family proteins". Microbiology. 154 (Pt 12): 3609–3623. doi:10.1099/mic.0.2008/022772-0. ISSN 1350-0872. PMID 19047729. Wikidata Q37338823.
- Matthew T G Holden; Richard W Titball; Sharon J Peacock; et al. (28 September 2004). "Genomic plasticity of the causative agent of melioidosis, Burkholderia pseudomallei". Proceedings of the National Academy of Sciences of the United States of America. 101 (39): 14240–5. Bibcode:2004PNAS..10114240H. doi:10.1073/pnas.0403302101. ISSN 0027-8424. PMC 521101. PMID 15377794. Wikidata Q24564168.
