= Francis Whatmough =

English cricketer

Francis John Whatmough (4 December 1856 – 3 June 1904) was an English first-class cricketer, who played seven matches for Yorkshire County Cricket Club between 1878 and 1882.

Born in Saltaire, Shipley, Yorkshire, England, and at birth was registered as Francis John Whatmuff, Whatmough was a right arm fast round arm bowler, who took five first-class wickets, with a best return of 3 for 58 against Nottinghamshire, at an average of 22.20. He scored 51 runs, with a best of 20 against Gloucestershire, at 5.10. Whatmough also took four catches in the field.

Whatmough died in June 1904, in Rastrick, Yorkshire.
