= Matthew Myers (cricketer) =

English cricketer

Matthew Myers (12 April 1847 – 8 December 1919) was an English first-class cricketer, who played twenty two games for Yorkshire County Cricket Club between 1876 and 1878. He also played for North of England (1877) and the Players of the North (1877–1878) in first-class games and for Yorkshire in non first-class matches.

Born in Yeadon, Yorkshire, England, Myers was a right-handed batsman, who scored 600 runs at 15.78, with a highest score of 49 against the Gentlemen of the North for The Players. He took eleven catches, but his round arm bowling failed to take a wicket, conceding 20 runs.

Myers started his cricket career with Casey's Clown Cricketers, and became a steady opening batsman with some good displays for Yorkshire in his three seasons with them. He had various professional engagements with Giggleswick School, Yeadon C.C., Saltaire C.C., Rastrick United C.C., Bacup C.C. and Burnley St. Andrews C.C., and later became a second-class umpire. He was on the reserve list of first-class umpires from 1906 to 1912, when living in Nelson, Lancashire, before returning to live in Town Street, Yeadon.

He died in Yeadon in December 1919.
