= Thomas Wright (cricketer, born 1900) =

English cricketer

Thomas John Wright (5 March 1900 – 7 November 1962) was an English amateur first-class cricketer, who played one match for Yorkshire County Cricket Club in 1919.

Born in North Ormesby, near Middlesbrough, Yorkshire, England, Wright was 19 years old when he scored twelve runs in his only innings, and he did not bowl. The two day, first-class match, against Cambridge University at Fenner's, was drawn in unusual circumstances. Cambridge were bowled out by Blackburn and Smith for 170, with Yorkshire scoring 383 in reply, including Wright's 12 runs batting at number six. Cambridge rallied to post 300, setting Yorkshire 87 to win. Wilfred Rhodes and Percy Holmes could only muster 80 runs in the twenty eight overs bowled, before the game was drawn.

He later became an audiologist. Wright died in Aberystwyth, Wales, in November 1962, aged 62.
