= Edward Butterfield =

English cricketer

Edward Banks Butterfield (22 October 1848 – 6 May 1899) was an English first-class cricketer, who played one match for Yorkshire County Cricket Club in 1870.

Born in Keighley, Yorkshire, Butterfield was a right-handed batsman who scored eight runs opening the innings, and ten, batting at number 4, against Nottinghamshire at Trent Bridge. Modest though this contribution was, every run proved vital, as Yorkshire won by only 2 runs, when Nottinghamshire were bowled out for 172 in their second innings.

Butterfield died in Keighley, aged 50, in May 1899.
