= Frederick Elam =

English cricketer

Frederick William Elam (13 September 1871 – 19 March 1943) was an English first-class cricketer, who played two matches for Yorkshire County Cricket Club, against Nottinghamshire in 1900 and Worcestershire in 1902. He played for the Yorkshire Second XI as late as 1919.

Born in Hunslet, Leeds, Yorkshire, England, Elam was a right-handed batsman, who scored 48 runs at an average of 24, with a best of 28 at Trent Bridge. His right arm fast medium bowling was not called upon.

Elam died in March 1943 in Headingley, Leeds.
