= Joshua Penny =

English cricketer

Joshua Hudson Penny (29 September 1856 – 29 July 1902) was an English first-class cricketer, who played one match for Yorkshire County Cricket Club, against W. G. Grace's Gloucestershire at The County Ground, Bristol in 1891.

Born in Yeadon, Yorkshire, England, Penny was a slow left arm orthodox spinner, who took 1 for 24 and 1 for 7, and scored 8 not out, as Yorkshire won the match by an innings and 40 runs, partly thanks to twelve wickets taken by his fellow slow left armer, Bobby Peel. Penny also appeared for Yorkshire in a non first-class match against Derbyshire at The County Ground, Derby. He took 1 for 20 and 2 for 38, and scored two runs in the drawn game.

Penny died in July 1902, in Savile Town, Dewsbury, Yorkshire.
