= Arthur Crowther =

English cricketer

Arthur Crowther (1 August 1878 – 4 June 1946) was an English first-class cricketer, who played one match for Yorkshire County Cricket Club in 1905, against Warwickshire at Dewsbury.

Born in Leeds, Yorkshire, England, he scored zero runs in both innings and did not bowl, although he did catch Fred Moorhouse off the bowling of Schofield Haigh for a duck. The bowling trio of Wilfred Rhodes, Haigh, and George Hirst won the match for Yorkshire by 66 runs. Crowther also played for the Yorkshire Second XI in the same year.

Crowther died in June 1946 in Bradford, Yorkshire.
