= Albert Judson =

English cricketer

Albert Judson (10 July 1885 – 8 April 1975) was an English first-class cricketer, who played one match for Yorkshire County Cricket Club against Kent, at Bramall Lane in July 1920.

Born in Cullingworth, Keighley, Yorkshire, England, Judson was a right arm fast medium bowler, who bowled one over in the game, conceding five runs, and did not take a wicket. Judson had no chance to bat either, nor did he take a catch, as the game finished in a rain ruined draw, with Kent scoring 36 without loss in their first innings. Judson delivered the last of the ten overs bowled in the match, and never played again.

He died in April 1975 in Bingley, Yorkshire.
