= William Smith (cricketer, born 1839) =

English cricketer

William Smith (1 November 1839 – 19 April 1897) was an English first-class cricketer, who played eleven matches for Yorkshire County Cricket Club from 1865 to 1874.

Born in Darlington, County Durham, England, Smith was a right-handed batsman, he scored 260 runs at an average of 16.25, with his best score of 90 against Lancashire in a Roses Match. He took eight catches in the field, but did not bowl.

Smith died in April 1897 in South Bank, Middlesbrough, Yorkshire.
