= Herbert Thewlis =

English cricketer

Herbert Thewlis (31 August 1865 – 30 November 1920) was an English first-class cricketer, who played two matches for Yorkshire County Cricket Club in 1888, against the Marylebone Cricket Club (MCC) and Gloucestershire. Yorkshire lost by 103 runs at Lord's, and drew the game at Clifton College.

Born in Lascelles Hall, Huddersfield, Yorkshire, England, Thewlis was a right-handed batsman, who scored only four runs in four innings, one of them not out (average of 1.33). He took two catches in the field, but did not bowl.

Thewlis died in Huddersfield in November 1920.
