= Brian Bainbridge =

English cricketer

Alfred Brian Bainbridge (born 15 October 1932, Middlesbrough, Yorkshire) is a former English first-class cricketer, who played five games for Yorkshire between 1961 and 1963. He was a right-arm off-break bowler, who took 20 wickets at an average of 17.90, with a match-winning best of 6 for 58 and 6 for 53 in Yorkshire's 52-run win over Essex at St George's Road Cricket Ground, Harrogate in 1961. A right-handed lower order batsman, he scored 93 runs at 9.30, with a best score of 24.

He appeared for Yorkshire's Second XI between 1954 and 1963, and played for Northamptonshire Second XI in 1960.
