= Edward Firth =

English cricketer (1886–1949)

Edward Loxley Firth (7 March 1886 – 8 January 1949) was an English first-class cricketer, who played two matches as an amateur for Yorkshire County Cricket Club in 1912. He had also appeared for Sheffield and District in 1911.

Firth was born in Hope, Derbyshire, and scored 43 runs in total, with a best of 37 on debut against Cambridge University, for an average of 10.75. He took a catch but did not bowl. His second and final match was an extraordinary affair against the touring Australian side at Bradford Park Avenue. Yorkshire batted first and posted 155, thanks to Benjamin Wilson (49) and George Hirst (45), and then bowled out Australia for 107, with Schofield Haigh taking 5 for 22 on a rain affected track. Yorkshire scored 66 for 7 before declaring, and had Australia reeling at 35 for 6 in 22 overs before the draw was called. Haigh took all 6 wickets for 14 runs in eleven overs.

Firth died in January 1949, in Syracuse, New York, United States. He was also known as Edward Loxley-Firth (and is credited as such in the Yorkshire County Cricket Club records).
