= Robert Baker (cricketer) =

English cricketer (1849-1896)

Robert Baker (13 July 1849 – 21 June 1896) was an English amateur first-class cricketer, who played three matches for Yorkshire between 1874 and 1875. He was a right-handed batsman who scored 45 runs at 11.25 with a best of 22, and a right arm fast-medium bowler, who bowled 16.2 overs for 43 runs without success.

Baker was born in Hunmanby, Yorkshire, England, and made his debut against Middlesex at the Prince's Ground, Chelsea in May 1874 and scored nine, opening Yorkshire's first innings. He dropped down the order for the second innings, but was instrumental in sealing the Tykes' five wicket win, putting on an unbeaten 28 for the sixth wicket in partnership with Allen Hill. His second appearance was also against Middlesex in the return game at Scarborough in September. Batting down at number 8, he hit his career high of 22 in Yorkshire's first innings of 172, but did not bat again as the game was drawn, with Middlesex fighting back after following on, 112 runs behind.

Baker's last appearance came a year later against the Marylebone Cricket Club (MCC) when he recorded a duck at number seven in the first innings. He was promoted to open second time around, but was run out for two, before Emmett and Ephraim Lockwood secured the draw.

Baker died in June 1896 in Scarborough, Yorkshire, aged 46.
