= Dick Squire =

English cricketer

- Born: December 1864
- Died: April 1922 (aged 57)
- Occupation: Cricketer

Dick Squire (31 December 1864 – 28 April 1922) was an English first-class cricketer, who played one match for Yorkshire County Cricket Club in 1893.

Born in Scholes, Cleckheaton, Yorkshire, England, Squire was a right-handed batsman. He bagged a pair against the Marylebone Cricket Club (MCC) at Lord's and failed to take a wicket, at a cost of 25 runs, with his slow left arm orthodox spin.

Squire died in April 1922 in Scholes, Yorkshire.
