= Edgar Firth =

English cricketer

Edgar Beckwith Firth (11 April 1863 – 25 July 1905) was an English first-class cricketer, who played one match for Yorkshire County Cricket Club in 1894.

Born in Malton, Yorkshire, England, and batting at number four, he scored one run in his only innings against the Marylebone Cricket Club (MCC), at North Marine Road Ground, Scarborough, as Yorkshire won by an innings and eleven runs. The MCC team featured Ranjitsinhji and Fred Spofforth.

His father was vicar of Malton and E. B. Firth also played for the Yorkshire Gentlemen, topping their batting averages in 1895. In 1897, he assisted the XVIII of Bedale against York Cricket Club. He himself was ordained in 1886, and lived in Malton before going to South Africa.

Firth died in July 1905, in Matjiesfontein, Cape Province, South Africa, aged 42.
