= George Render =

English cricketer

George William Armitage Render (5 January 1887 – 17 September 1922) was an English first-class cricketer, who played one match for Yorkshire County Cricket Club in 1919.

Born in Dewsbury, Yorkshire, England, Render was a right-handed batsman, who scored 5 batting at number five, in his only innings against Derbyshire at Bradford Park Avenue. His right arm medium fast bowling was not called upon. Yorkshire won the match by ten wickets.

Render also played for the Heavy Woollen District in 1911, Yorkshire Cricket Council in 1912 and the Yorkshire Second XI from 1912 to 1919 in local representative games.

He died, just three years after his only first-class match, in September 1922 in Hanging Heaton, Yorkshire, aged 35.
