= Charles Wheater =

English cricketer

Charles Henry Wheater (4 March 1860 – 11 May 1885) was an English amateur first-class cricketer, who played in two matches for Yorkshire County Cricket Club in 1880, against I Zingari and the Marylebone Cricket Club (MCC).

Born in Hunmanby, Yorkshire, England, Wheater was a right-handed batsman, who scored 45 runs at 15.00, with a best score of 27 against the MCC. His right arm medium bowling was not called upon, although he did take three catches.

Wheater died in May 1885, in Scarborough, Yorkshire, at the age of 25.
