= William Lancaster (cricketer) =

English cricketer

Personal information
- Full name: William Whiteley Lancaster
- Born: 4 February 1873; Scholes, Huddersfield, Yorkshire, England
- Died: 30 December 1938 (aged 65); Marsh, Huddersfield, Yorkshire, England
- Batting: Right-handed
- Bowling: Right arm roundarm
- Role: All-rounder

Domestic team information
- Years: Team
- 1895: Yorkshire

Career statistics
Competition	First-class
Matches	7
Runs scored	163
Batting average	16.30
100s/50s	–/1
Top score	51
Balls bowled	30
Wickets	–
Bowling average	–
5 wickets in innings	–
10 wickets in match	–
Best bowling	–
Catches/stumpings	1/–
- Source: CricketArchive, 28 July 2008

William Whiteley Lancaster (4 February 1873 – 30 December 1938) was an English first-class cricketer, who played seven games for Yorkshire County Cricket Club in 1895.

Born in Scholes, Huddersfield, Yorkshire, Lancaster was a right-handed batsman, who scored 163 runs at an average of 16.30, with a highest score of 51 against Derbyshire. A right arm, round arm fast bowler, he bowled five overs for 29 runs without success.

Lancaster died in Marsh, Huddersfield, in December 1938, aged 65.
