= Fairfax Gill =

English cricketer

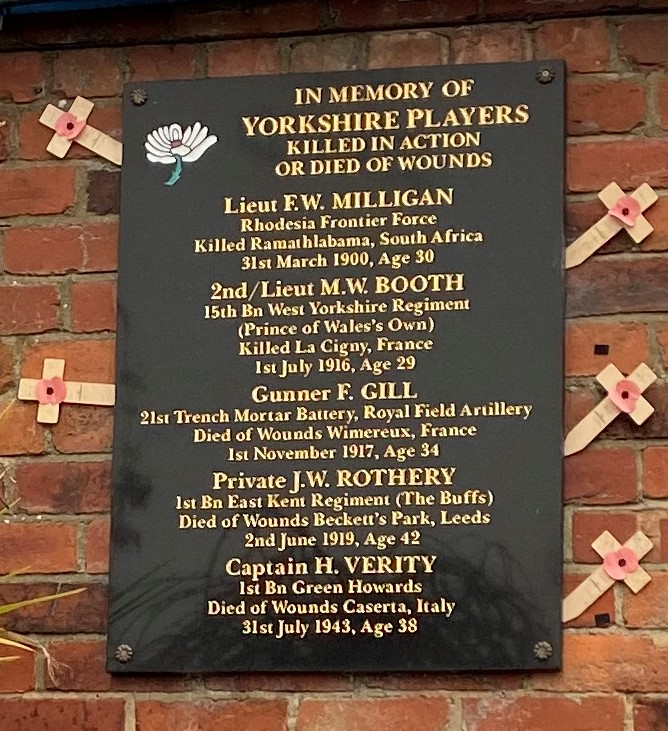

Personal information
- Born: 3 September 1883; Wakefield, Yorkshire, England
- Died: 1 November 1917 (aged 34); Wimereux, France
- Batting: Right-handed
- Role: Batsman

Domestic team information
- Years: Team
- 1903: Yorkshire Cricket Council
- 1906: Yorkshire Second XI
- 1906: Yorkshire County Cricket Club

Fairfax Gill (3 September 1883 – 1 November 1917) was an English first-class cricketer, who played two matches for Yorkshire County Cricket Club in 1906.

Born in Wakefield, Yorkshire, England, Gill was a right-handed middle order batsman, who made his debut against Derbyshire at Queen's Park, Chesterfield. He was run out for 1, and bowled by Billy Bestwick for 3, as Yorkshire won the game by 33 runs. His second, and final game, came against Nottinghamshire at Trent Bridge. He was bowled by John Gunn for 11 and then, promoted to open the innings, bowled by Albert Hallam for 3 in a drawn match, more notable for twin centuries by David Denton.

Gill also played for the Yorkshire Cricket Council in 1903, and the Yorkshire Second XI in 1906.

Gill died aged 34, in November 1917 at Wimereux, near Boulogne-sur-Mer, France, in World War I.

The Wakefield Express called him "a true sportsman" who was "never carried away by success".
