= Alfred Firth =

English cricketer

Alfred Firth (3 September 1847 – 16 January 1927) was an English first-class cricketer, who played one match for Yorkshire County Cricket Club in 1869.

Born in Dewsbury, Yorkshire, England, Firth scored four runs in his only innings, against Surrey at The Oval, and he did not bowl in the match. Yorkshire won the game by seven wickets, thanks to hundreds from openers Joseph Rowbotham and Ephraim Lockwood.

He later lived at Bevor House, Heckmondwike.

Firth died in January 1927 in Wyke, Bradford, aged 79.
