= Thomas Bottomley =

English cricketer

Thomas Bottomley (26 December 1910 – 19 February 1977) was an English first-class cricketer, who played in six matches for Yorkshire County Cricket Club in 1934 and 1935.

Born in Rawmarsh, Yorkshire, England, Bottomley was a right-handed batsman. He scored 142 runs at 20.28 with a best of 51 against Essex, and took the wicket of Jack Davies of Kent with his right arm medium bowling at a total cost of 188 runs. Five of his games came in 1934, with a solitary County Championship appearance in the following year.

He died aged 66, in February 1977, in Rotherham.
