= Charles Gifkins =

English cricketer

- Born: Charles John Gifkins; 19 February 1856; South Orange, New Jersey, US
- Died: 31 January 1897 (aged 40); Albuquerque, New Mexico, United States
- Occupation: Cricket player

Charles John Gifkins (19 February 1856 – 31 January 1897) was an English amateur first-class cricketer, who played two matches for Yorkshire County Cricket Club in 1880.

Born in Thames Ditton, Surrey, England, Gifkins was a right-handed batsman, who made his debut against Surrey at The Oval. Opening the innings with George Ulyett he scored a career best 23 in his first knock, putting on 71 for the first wicket. Ulyett went on to post 141 as Yorkshire scored 398, and won the match by an innings and 123 runs. Gifkins' second, and final game, was the following match against Middlesex at Bramall Lane, Sheffield which was less successful. He scored seven and a duck, and the visitors won by six wickets. In total, Gifkins he scored 30 runs at an average of 10.00 and took one catch, that being William Ford off the bowling of Tom Emmett in the Middlesex match.

Gifkins, suffering from tuberculosis, committed suicide in January 1897, at the age of 40, in Albuquerque, New Mexico, United States.
