= Seth Waring =

English cricketer (1838–1919)

Seth Waring (4 November 1838 – 17 April 1919) was an English first-class cricketer, who played one match for Yorkshire County Cricket Club in 1870.

Born in Billingly, Darfield, Yorkshire, England, Waring was a right-handed batsman, who scored nine runs, batting at number three, in his only first-class innings against Surrey at Bramall Lane. His right arm medium pace was not called upon. Yorkshire won the match by seven wickets.

Waring died in April 1919 in Keighley, Yorkshire.
