= Walker Smith (cricketer) =

English cricketer

Walker Smith (14 August 1847 – 7 July 1900) was an English first-class cricketer, who played five matches for Yorkshire County Cricket Club in 1874.

Born in Ossett, Yorkshire, England, Smith was a right-handed batsman, who scored 152 runs at 16.88, with his best score being 59 against Surrey. He took three catches in the field and did not bowl.

Smith died in July 1900 in Drighlington, Leeds, Yorkshire.
