= Abraham Sowden =

English cricketer

- Born: 1 December 1853; Great Horton, Bradford, Yorkshire, England
- Died: 5 July 1921 (aged 67); Heaton, West Yorkshire, England

Abraham Sowden (1 December 1853 – 5 July 1921) was an English first-class cricketer, who played eight matches for Yorkshire County Cricket Club from 1878 to 1887, and for T Emmett's XI in 1881, plus an England XI against the Australians in 1902, when he was aged 48.

Born in Great Horton, Bradford, Yorkshire, England, and registered as Abram Sowden, he was a successful batsman for Bingley C.C. from 1875 to 1893 and for Bradford C.C. from 1893 to 1901.

In ten first-class matches he scored 163 runs, with a best score of 37 against Kent, and he took one catch. He bowled right arm fast with a round arm action, but conceded 70 runs without success.

Sowden was a worsted manufacturer by trade, and died in July 1921 in Heaton, Yorkshire.
