= Peter Borrill =

English cricketer

Peter David Borrill (born 4 July 1951) is an English former first-class cricketer, who played two matches for Yorkshire County Cricket Club in 1971. A right arm fast medium bowler, he made his debut against Oxford University and took 2 for 27 and 2 for 6, in a comfortable innings win for the Tykes. This performance won him a place in the County Championship game against Sussex at the County Cricket Ground, Hove, where he removed Roger Prideaux at a cost of just two runs in the second innings of a drawn game. Despite this promising start, the strength of Yorkshire's seam bowling attack precluded further appearances, and his first-class career was over before the age of 20. His five first-class wickets had cost 12.20 each.

He played three games for the Second XI in 1970, four more in 1971 and reappeared for one match in 1972. His further playing career was with Leeds C.C., although he had spells as a professional with Darlington in 1973, and also played for Hanging Heaton in 1982. He later played with Old Modernians in the Leeds League.
