= Joseph Redfearn =

English cricketer

Joseph Redfearn (13 May 1862 – 14 January 1931) was an English first-class cricketer, who played one match for Yorkshire County Cricket Club in 1890 against Surrey.

Born in Lascelles Hall, Huddersfield, Yorkshire, England, and registered as Joah Redfearn, but commonly known as Joe, Redfearn was a left-handed batsman, who scored five runs in his only innings in a low scoring, but rain ruined, draw. He played in six other games that season in non first-class cricket against Warwickshire (twice), Essex, Derbyshire, Leicestershire and Staffordshire.

He died in January 1931 in Lepton, Huddersfield.
