= Haworth Watson =

English cricketer

Haworth Watson (26 September 1880 – 24 November 1951) was an English first-class cricketer, who played twenty nine matches for Yorkshire County Cricket Club between 1908 and 1914. He also appeared for the North of England in 1908. He played for the Yorkshire Second XI from 1908 to 1913, and R. W. Frank's XI in 1906.

Born in Barnoldswick, Yorkshire, England, Watson was a wicketkeeper, who took forty six catches and completed ten stumpings. He scored 189 runs at 7.56, with a best of 41 against Leicestershire.

Watson died in November 1951, in Doncaster, Yorkshire.
