= Ockford Ridge =

Coordinates: 51.16°N 00.64°W

Ockford Ridge is the part of the parish and town of Godalming, Surrey, England west of the London-Portsmouth railway. It has a narrow buffer to the west, east of a small village, Eashing which adjoins the A3 trunk road.

== Geography ==
Housing is clustered in a rounded pattern of roads around its church and Eashing Cemetery. It is all part of the parish and town of Godalming, Surrey, England, namely the area west of the London-Portsmouth railway. It has a narrow buffer to the west, east of a small village, Eashing which adjoins the A3 trunk road.

== History ==
The housing was mainly built in the 1930s, a minority is Victorian properties or post-1980s. Within this area was a grand house, Ockfordwood House rebuilt in the 1870s by Thomas Cooper. Later converted into flats, it was to be incorporated into Aaron's Hill, but it burnt down in the 1950s.

The residential estate bore alternate late 1930s names 'Chestnut Avenue', 'Chestnut Road' or 'Chestnut Green'; settling on Ockford Ridge to accommodating the pre-obligatory postcodes Royal Mail addressing system. The land for 1930s housing was bought from Eashing Park House and Godalming Burial Commission. After this building the estate had a church, shops, a post office and a pub. Notable numbers of buyers came from Northern England and South Wales. King Alfred Court has replaced a large public house named after the Anglo-Saxon king.

Further housing has been added in modest applications of the 21st century, tempered for example by the rejection of a larger application for 119 homes on Secretts of Milford farmland.

Incidents of anti-social behaviour have been reported in Ockford Ridge.

== Amenities ==
Amenities mainly comprise a shop-post office, bus services, St Mark's Anglican church, one of two serving Godalming parish, a pub with outdoor areas, a primary school, and a square cemetery.
