= Herbert Walton (priest) =

The Ven Herbert Arthur Walton
- Anglican Archdeacon of Grenada
- Church: Church of England
- See: Windward Isles
- In office: 1915–1922
- Previous posts: Incumbent at St Faith, Edmonton

Personal details
- Died: 15 April 1955 Saffron Walden

Herbert Arthur Walton was an Anglican priest in the twentieth century.

He was educated at King Edward's School, Birmingham and St Boniface Missionary College, Warminster; and ordained in 1905. After a curacy at St John's Cathedral, Antigua he was Rector of St George, Dominica then Archdeacon of Grenada from 1915 to 1922; then Organising Secretary for the SPG in The Midlands from 1922 to 1924; Rector of Avon Dassett from 1924 to 1927; Home Secretary of the SPG from 1927 until 1933; Rector of Ascot from 1933 to 1946 and Rector of Brightwell-cum-Sotwell from 1946 to 1954.

He died on 15 April 1955.
