= Arthur Thornton =

English cricketer (1854–1915)

Personal information
- Full name: Arthur Thornton
- Born: 20 July 1854; Wilsden, Yorkshire, England
- Died: 19 April 1915 (aged 60); Saltaire, Yorkshire, England
- Batting: Right-handed

Domestic team information
- Years: Team
- 1881: Yorkshire

Career statistics
Competition	FC
Matches	3
Runs scored	21
Batting average	5.25
100s/50s	–/ –
Top score	7
Balls bowled	–
Wickets	–
Bowling average	–
5 wickets in innings	–
10 wickets in match	–
Best bowling	–
Catches/stumpings	2/ –
- Source: Cricinfo, 31 May 2010

Arthur Thornton (20 July 1854 – 19 April 1915) was an English first-class cricketer. Thornton was a right-handed batsman.

Born in Wilsden, Bingley, Yorkshire, Thornton played three first-class matches in 1881 for Yorkshire County Cricket Club against Surrey, Nottinghamshire and Lancashire.

Thornton died in April 1915, aged 60, in Saltaire, Yorkshire.
