= William Rhodes (cricketer, born 1883) =

English cricketer

Personal information
- Born: 4 March 1883; Bradford, Yorkshire
- Died: 5 August 1941 (aged 58); Bradford, Yorkshire
- Batting: Right-handed
- Bowling: Right-arm fast
- Role: Bowler

Domestic team information
- Years: Team
- 1911: Yorkshire
- Only FC: 10 July 1911 Yorkshire v Indians
- Source: CricketArchive, 21 November 2023

William Rhodes (4 March 1883 – 5 August 1941) was an English first-class cricketer, who played one match for Yorkshire County Cricket Club in 1911, when he also played for the Second XI. He bowled eleven overs of right arm pace for 40 runs, against the Indian Tourists at The Circle, Kingston upon Hull, but failed to take a wicket. Rhodes was left one not out in his only innings. Yorkshire won the match by an innings and 43 runs. Alfred Pullin, writing as "Old Ebor" in the Yorkshire Evening Post during the course of the match, was not complimentary about Rhodes. "I doubt whether Rhodes makes the most of his physical abilities," Pullin wrote. "He has a short ambling run, and does not go through with his delivery, and it is not by these restricted movements that fast bowling usually is developed."

Before his single first-class appearance, Rhodes was briefly profiled in Cricket: A Weekly Record of the Game as "the Bankfoot fast bowler who has been showing such promising form of late in Yorkshire". The article says that Rhodes had played for cricket clubs at Idle, Fifeshire in Scotland and at Wibsey before joining Bankfoot CC in 1910; in his first season for Bankfoot in the Bradford Cricket League he took 86 wickets at a cost of just over seven runs apiece.

Rhodes was born at Bradford in Yorkshire in 1883 and died there in August 1941 at the age of 58.
