= Harry Dewse =

English cricketer

Harry Dewse (23 February 1836 – 8 July 1910) was an English first-class cricketer, who played one match for Yorkshire County Cricket Club, against Middlesex at the Prince's Cricket Ground, Chelsea in May 1873.

He took a catch and conceded 15 runs in four underarm overs (of four balls each) without taking a wicket. In his two innings he scored 2 and 12. An occasional wicket-keeper, he did not keep wicket in this game. Middlesex won the game by 10 wickets. Born in York, England, Dewse died in July 1910 in the same city.
