= William Haywood (cricketer) =

English cricketer

William John Haywood (25 February 1841 – 7 January 1912) was an English first-class cricketer, who played one match for Yorkshire County Cricket Club in 1878, against Middlesex at Bramall Lane, Sheffield. Middlesex won by an innings and 94 runs.

Born in Upper Hallam, Sheffield, Yorkshire, England, Haywood was a right arm medium fast bowler, and he bowled Isaac Walker for 59, taking his only wicket at a cost of 14 runs. Haywood scored a duck and seven in his two innings. He also played for Hunslet Cricket Club against the Gentlemen of Canada in a non first-class fixture in 1880.

Haywood died in Walkley, Sheffield in January 1912.
