= Stanley Douglas =

English cricketer

Joseph Stanley Douglas (4 April 1903 – 27 December 1971) was an English first-class cricketer, who played 23 matches for Yorkshire County Cricket Club between 1925 and 1934.

Born in Bradford, Yorkshire, England, Douglas was a left arm medium fast bowler, who took 49 wickets at 26.73 each, with a best of 6 for 59 against Oxford University. His only five wicket haul in the County Championship was his 5 for 48 against Essex. A left-handed tail ender, he scored 125 runs at 6.94, with a best score of 19 against Hampshire.

He also played for the Yorkshire Second XI (1925–1933) and Minor Counties North (1927).

Douglas died in December 1971 in Paignton, Devon.
