= Martin Riley (cricketer) =

English cricketer & umpire (1851–1899)

Martin Riley (5 April 1851 – 1 June 1899) was an English amateur first-class cricketer, who played seventeen first-class matches for Yorkshire County Cricket Club from 1878 to 1882.

Born in Liversedge, Cleckheaton, Yorkshire, England, Riley was a right-handed batsman and occasional right arm fast round arm bowler. He also played first-class cricket for an England XI in 1882, Tom Emmett's XI in 1883 and Alfred Shaw's Australian Team in 1885. Riley also played for Hunslet and District in 1878, and South Wales Cricket Club from 1881 to 1882.

In all he played 20 first-class games, scoring 381 runs in 34 innings, with a highest score of 92 against I Zingari. He also umpired in at least four first-class matches in the Scarborough Festival.

Riley died in June 1899 in Harrogate, Yorkshire, aged 48.
