= George Lynas =

English cricketer (1832–1896)

George Goulton Lynas (7 September 1832 – 8 December 1896) was an English first-class cricketer, who played in both Roses Matches for Yorkshire County Cricket Club in 1867. Yorkshire won the first, at Old Trafford by 165 runs and the second, at Swatter's Carr, Linthorpe Road East Ground in Middlesbrough by an innings.

Born in Coatham, Redcar, Yorkshire, England, Lynas was a right-handed tail ender, who scored four runs in his three innings, averaging 2.00. His right arm round arm fast bowling was not called upon, but he was also an occasional wicket-keeper. He also took two catches in his games.

Lynas died in December 1896 in Skelton-in-Cleveland, Yorkshire.
