= Rodney Smith (cricketer) =

English county cricketer (born 1944)

Rodney Smith (born 6 April 1944, Batley, Yorkshire, England) was an English first-class cricketer, who played for Yorkshire County Cricket Club in 1969 and 1970.

Smith was a right-handed batsman, who played five first-class matches and three one day games. He scored 99 first-class runs, with a best of 37 not out against Gloucestershire. His slow, left arm orthodox spin bowling, was not called upon.
