= Luther Whitehead =

English cricketer

Luther Whitehead (25 June 1869 – 16 January 1931) was an English first-class cricketer, who played in two matches for Yorkshire County Cricket Club in 1893, against the Marylebone Cricket Club (MCC) and Gloucestershire.

Born in Kingston upon Hull, Yorkshire, England, Whitehead was a right-handed batsman who scored 21 runs in four innings, for an average of 5.25. Yorkshire beat MCC by seventeen runs in his debut match, and triumphed against Gloucestershire by nine wickets in the second. Whitehead made his best score in the latter match, before being bowled by 13 by W. G. Grace.

Whitehead played for Ossett C.C. from 1907 to 1913, acting as their professional in 1907.

He was head of the Leeds Meter Company, and died on business at the age of 61, in January 1931 in Buenos Aires, Argentina.
