= Donald Shepherd =

English cricketer

Donald Arthur Shepherd (10 March 1916 – 29 May 1998) was an English amateur first-class cricketer, who played one match for Yorkshire County Cricket Club in 1938.

Shepherd was born in Whitkirk, Leeds, Yorkshire, England. Batting at number five, he scored a duck in his only innings and did not bowl his off breaks in the game against Oxford University, which ended in a high scoring draw after Oxford compiled 344 for 8 dec after following on. He also played for the Yorkshire Second XI (1937–1938).

He died in May 1998 in Norbiton, Kingston-upon-Thames, Surrey.
