= Amos Marshall =

English cricketer

Personal information
- Full name: Amos Marshall
- Born: 10 July 1849; Yeadon, Yorkshire, England
- Died: 3 August 1891 (aged 42); Yeadon, Yorkshire, England
- Batting: Right-handed
- Bowling: Left-arm medium

Domestic team information
- Years: Team
- 1874: Yorkshire

Career statistics
Competition	First-class
Matches	2
Runs scored	18
Batting average	6.00
100s/50s	–/–
Top score	13
Balls bowled	47
Wickets	1
Bowling average	18.00
5 wickets in innings	–
10 wickets in match	–
Best bowling	1/7
Catches/stumpings	–/–
- Source: Cricinfo, 4 July 2022

Amos Marshall (10 July 1849 – 3 August 1891) was an English first-class cricketer, who played one match for Yorkshire County Cricket Club in 1874, and one match for the North of England in 1875.

Born in Yeadon, Yorkshire, England, his sole match for Yorkshire came in the Roses Match against LAncashire at Great Horton Road, Bradford. He bowled seven overs for eleven runs in Lancashire's innings, coming on second change with his left arm medium pace, as Lancashire compiled 209. Batting in the tail he was dismissed for a duck and 2, as Yorkshire suffered an innings defeat on a rain affected wicket.

His last game came against the South of England for the North of England at Lord's in May 1875. He was second top scorer, with 13, as James Southerton took 9 for 30 to bowl out the North for just 90. Southerton was denied his tenth wicket only by the last man being run out. Marshall took 1 wicket for 7 in 4.30, as the South were skittled in turn for 123. Marshall was left not out 3 when the North again collapsed to 72 all out, with Southerton returning match figures of 16 for 55, and W. G. Grace and Henry Jupp scored the 41 needed to win by 10 wickets.

Marshall died in Yeadon in August 1891, aged 42.
