= Louis Ryder =

English cricketer

Louis Ryder (28 August 1900 – 24 January 1955) was an English first-class cricketer, who played two matches for Yorkshire County Cricket Club in 1924.

Born in Thirsk, Yorkshire, England, Ryder was a right arm fast bowler, who took four wickets at 37.75, with a best of 2 for 75. He scored one run and nought not out in his two innings, and took two catches. He also played for the Yorkshire Second XI from 1922 to 1926.

Ryder died in January 1955, at Dowgill Farm, Summerbridge, Harrogate, Yorkshire, aged 54.
