= William Shackleton =

English cricketer

William Allan Shackleton (9 March 1908 – 16 November 1971) was an English first-class cricketer, who played five matches for Yorkshire County Cricket Club between 1928 and 1934.

Born in Keighley, Yorkshire, Shackleton was a right arm medium pacer and leg break bowler, who took six wickets at 21.66, with a best of 4 for 18 against Middlesex. He scored 49 runs as a right-handed batsman, his highest score of 25 coming against Kent, at an overall average of 8.16. Shackleton also took three catches.

Shackleton died in November 1971 in Bridlington, Yorkshire.
