= Tony Hatton =

English cricketer

Anthony George Hatton (born 25 March 1937, Whitkirk, Leeds, Yorkshire, England) is an English first-class cricketer, who played three matches for Yorkshire County Cricket Club in 1960 and 1961.

A right arm fast bowler, he took six wickets at 33.66, with a best of 2 for 27 against Kent County Cricket Club. He batted, left-handed, just once, scoring 4 not out against Northamptonshire County Cricket Club.
