= Samuel Flaxington =

English cricketer

Samuel Flaxington (14 October 1860 – 10 March 1895) was an English first-class cricketer, who played four matches for Yorkshire County Cricket Club in 1882, against Sussex, Gloucestershire, Middlesex and Kent respectively.

Flaxingtom worked as a schoolmaster in the mid-1880s. He committed suicide in March 1895, aged 34.

== Career and suicide ==
Born in Otley, Yorkshire, England, Flaxington was a right-handed batsman, who scored 121 runs at an average of 15.12, with a top score of 57 against Sussex on his debut.

After living at Yeadon at one time, he became a schoolmaster at Otley, playing for the local club in 1886 and 1887. Flaxington committed suicide in March 1895, aged 34, and is buried in Yeadon Cemetery.
