= William Harris (cricketer, born 1861) =

English cricketer

William Harris (21 November 1861 – 23 May 1923) was an English first-class cricketer, who played four matches for Yorkshire County Cricket Club between 1884 and 1887, against Kent (two matches), Sussex and Cambridge University.

Born in Greasbrough, Rotherham, Yorkshire, England, Harris was a left-handed batsman. He scored 45 runs at 7.50, with a best score of 25 on debut against Kent in 1844. He took one catch and, when bowling, conceded 18 runs without taking a wicket.

He played with the Aldewick Park C.C. before moving to Worksop, Nottinghamshire, in 1885, and York Town C.C. in 1886. He also had several seasons at Armley C.C. but was at Haslingden, Lancashire, as a professional in 1892 and 1893 and then as amateur. His 106 not out against Bacup C.C. was the first century on the Haslingden ground.

Harris died in May 1923, in Longsight, Manchester.
