= Tom Burgess (cricketer) =

English cricketer

Thomas Burgess (1 October 1859 – 15 February 1922) was an English first-class cricketer, who played one match for Yorkshire against Essex in Harrogate in 1895. A right-handed batsman, he failed to score a run in the match, and did not bowl his right arm fast medium either, as Essex won a tight match by 16 runs.

Born in Harrogate, Yorkshire, England, Burgess died aged 62, in February 1922.
