= William Oates (Irish cricketer) =

Irish cricketer (1852–1940)

Personal information
- Born: 1 January 1852
- Died: 9 December 1940 (aged 88)
- Batting: Right-handed
- Role: Wicket-keeper

Domestic team information
- Years: Team
- 1874–1875: Yorkshire County Cricket Club

William Oates (1 January 1852 – 9 December 1940) was an Irish first-class cricketer, who played in seven first-class matches for Yorkshire in 1874 and 1875. He became the first Irish-born cricketer to appear for Yorkshire.

He was born in Coolattin, Shillelagh, County Wicklow, Ireland (not at Wentworth Park, Rotherham, Yorkshire, England, as is widely reported). A right-handed batsman and wicket-keeper, he scored 34 runs in his seven matches, with a best score of 14 not out, for an average of 5.66. He also took five catches, and effected one stumping.

Oates died in Clifton Park, Rotherham, in December 1940, at the age of 88.
