= Hugh Wood (cricketer) =

English cricketer, teacher, and priest

Hugh Wood (22 March 1855 – 31 July 1941) was an English amateur first-class cricketer, later a school teacher and Church of England priest.

Born in Ecclesall, Sheffield, Yorkshire, Wood was educated at Sheffield Collegiate School and Sidney Sussex College, Cambridge. He was a slow left arm orthodox spinner and right-handed lower order batsman, who appeared in ten matches for Cambridge University in 1878 and 1879, and ten matches for Yorkshire in 1879 and 1880. He also appeared for the Gentlemen of the North in 1879.

Wood took five wickets in an innings on five occasions, and ten wickets in a match once, taking 7 for 41 for Cambridge University against Surrey, and 7 for 46 against the Gentlemen of England. He finished his first-class career with the record of 67 wickets at 11.32 each, with a strike rate of 37.46 and an economy rate of 1.81 runs conceded per over. He proved less accomplished with the bat, top scoring with 36 for Yorkshire against I Zingari in the Scarborough Festival.

After leaving Cambridge, Wood taught at Wellington College for eight years, during which he was ordained as a Church of England priest. He was chaplain at Broadmoor Hospital 1893–1906, then vicar of Whitchurch, Buckinghamshire, from 1908 until his death there in 1941.
