= Samuel Ellis (English cricketer) =

English cricketer

Samuel Ellis (23 November 1851 – 28 October 1930) was an English first-class cricketer, who played as an amateur for an England against The Players of the North in 1878, and in two matches for Yorkshire County Cricket Club in 1880, against the touring Australians and Derbyshire.

Born in Dewsbury, Yorkshire, England, Ellis was a right-handed batsman who scored 16 runs, with a best of 9, for an average of 3.20.

Ellis died in October 1930, in Milnthorpe House, Sandal Magna, Wakefield, Yorkshire.
