= Stanley Raper =

English cricketer

James Rhodes Stanley Raper (9 August 1909 – 9 March 1997) was an English first-class cricketer, who played three matches for Yorkshire County Cricket Club against Derbyshire and Gloucestershire in 1936, and after World War II, versus Nottinghamshire in 1947.

Born in Bradford, Yorkshire, England, Raper was a right-handed batsman, who scored 24 runs with a top score of 15. His right arm medium pace was not called upon in the first-class game.

He also played for the Yorkshire Second XI from 1932 to 1948, the Marylebone Cricket Club (MCC) in 1939, and the Minor Counties in 1948.

He died in March 1997 in the Ribble Valley, Yorkshire.
