= Thomas Tait (cricketer) =

English cricketer

Thomas Tait (7 October 1872 – 6 September 1954) was an English first-class cricketer, who played two matches for Yorkshire County Cricket Club in 1898 and 1899.

Born in Langley Moor, County Durham, England, Tait was a right-handed batsman, who scored seven runs in three innings with one not out, at an average of 3.50. He also took one catch.

Tait died in September 1954 in Brierley, Hemsworth, Yorkshire, England at the age of 81.
