= Charles Halliley =

English cricketer

Charles Halliley (5 December 1852 – 23 March 1929) was an English first-class cricketer, who played three matches for Yorkshire County Cricket Club in 1872, against Lancashire, Nottinghamshire, and Surrey respectively.

Halliley was born in Earlsheaton, Dewsbury, Yorkshire, England, and was a right-handed batsman. Yorkshire lost the Roses Match at Bramall Lane by 42 runs, with Halliley opening his first-class career with a duck and then two runs batting at number 3 in the order. He was promoted in the order to open against Notts, scoring his career best 17 in the first innings, but was out for a duck second time round as Yorkshire lost by six runs. He opened again against Surrey, scoring 8, and Yorkshire won by ten wickets thanks to a century from Ephraim Lockwood. In total, he scored 27 runs at an average of 5.40, with a top score of 17. He did not bowl but took two catches.

For XVII Colts of England v United North of England at Dewsbury in 1872, Halliley made his first-class top score of 52 not out. He also played in other matches against England in 1872.

Halliley died in March 1929 in Ravensthorpe, Yorkshire.
