= Stephen Stuchbury =

English cricketer (born 1954)

Stephen Stuchbury (born 22 June 1954 in Sheffield, Yorkshire died 9 April 2024 near Southampton, England) was an English former first-class cricketer, who played three first-class matches, and 22 List A one day games, for Yorkshire County Cricket Club between 1978 and 1981.

== Career ==
A left arm medium bowler, he took eight wickets at 29.50, with a best of 3 for 82 against Lancashire in a Roses Match. A left-handed batsman, he scored seven runs with a best of four not out. He was more successful in one day cricket, taking 29 wickets at 23.34, with a best of 5 for 16 against Leicestershire. He scored 21 one day runs, with a best of 9 for an average of 5.25.

He also played for the Yorkshire Second XI from 1976 to 1978, and Yorkshire Under-25s from 1973 to 1978.
