= George Bayes =

English cricketer

George William Bayes (27 February 1884 – 6 December 1960) was an English first-class cricketer, who played eighteen first-class matches for Yorkshire between 1910 and 1921.

Born in Flamborough, Yorkshire, England, Bayes was a right-handed batsman and right arm fast bowler, scoring a total of 165 runs at 12.69, with a highest score of 36, and taking 48 wickets at 31.95 with a best of 5 for 83.

Bayes was a Flamborough fish merchant and had several engagements around the county. He was with Scarborough Cricket Club from 1911 to 1913, and also played for Castleford C.C. and Tong Park C.C. He also played in at least six matches for the Yorkshire Second XI against Minor county opposition.
