= Robert Wright (English cricketer) =

English cricketer

Robert Wright (19 July 1852 – 25 May 1891) was an English first-class cricketer.

Born Robert Wright Ward, in Adwalton, Leeds, Yorkshire, England, he played for the North of England against the South of England at Lord's in 1875, and in two matches for Yorkshire County Cricket Club against Middlesex and Surrey in 1877. A right-handed middle order batsman, Wright scored 37 runs at 7.40, with a highest score of 22 on his county debut against Middlesex. He slipped down the order in the defeat against Surrey, and his services were not required again. His right arm, round arm slow bowling was not called upon. He scored five and four runs in the North's ten wicket defeat, against a South team which featured W. G. Grace.

Wright died in January 1891 in Oldham, Lancashire, at the age of 39.
