= Bernard Brooke =

English cricketer (1930–2021)

Bernard Brooke (3 March 1930 – 19 April 2021) was an English first-class cricketer, who played two matches for Yorkshire in 1950, against the Marylebone Cricket Club (MCC) and Oxford University. A right arm medium fast bowler, he took two wickets at 95.5, and scored 16 runs, with a best of 14, at an average of 4.00.

Brooke was born on 3 March 1930. He played for Yorkshire Second XI from 1948 to 1953. Brooke died on 19 April 2021, at the age of 91.
