= Chris Schofield (cricketer, born 1976) =

English cricketer (born 1976)

Chris Schofield (born Christopher John Schofield; 21 March 1976 in Barnsley, Yorkshire) played one first-class cricket match for Yorkshire County Cricket Club at the age of 20 in 1996, scoring 25 in his only innings.

In eight England under-19 'Tests' he scored 414 runs at 34.50, with a highest score of 92, and in nine under-19 one day internationals, Schofield scored 119 runs at 17.00, with a best of 35.
