= Arthur Sellers =

English cricketer

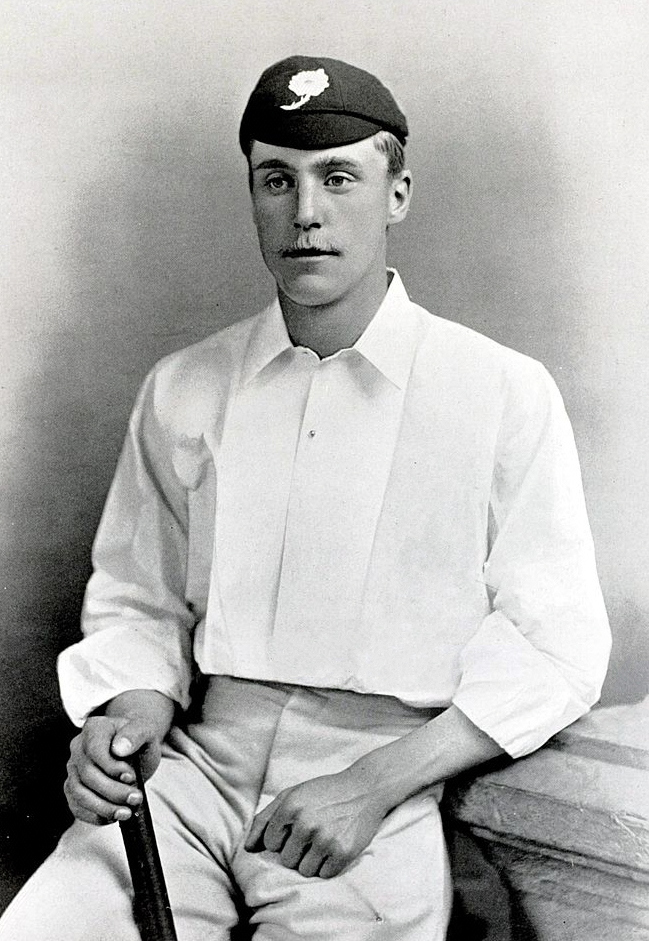

Personal information
- Born: 31 May 1870; Keighley, Yorkshire, England
- Died: 25 September 1941 (aged 71); Keighley, Yorkshire, England
- Batting: Right-handed

Career statistics
Competition	First-class
Matches	53
Runs scored	1,852
Batting average	19.91
100s/50s	2/7
Top score	105
Balls bowled	220
Wickets	2
Bowling average	74.50
5 wickets in innings	0
10 wickets in match	0
Best bowling	74.50
Catches/stumpings	47/–

Arthur Sellers (31 May 1870 – 25 September 1941) was an English amateur first-class cricketer, who played for Yorkshire County Cricket Club from 1890 to 1899, and in other first-class matches for the North of England (1893) and Gentlemen of England (1895).

Born in Keighley, Yorkshire, Sellers, in 53 first-class games, scored 1,852 runs at 19.91, hitting two centuries against Middlesex and Somerset. Sellers took 47 catches and two wickets, at 74.50. Both victims came in a spell of 2 for 28 against Kent.

Sellers died in Keighley in September 1941.

His son, Brian Sellers, was Yorkshire captain from 1933 to 1947, and a Wisden Cricketer of the Year in 1940.
