= James Rothery =

English cricketer

James William Rothery (5 September 1877 – 2 June 1919) was an English first-class cricketer, who played 150 matches for Yorkshire County Cricket Club between 1903 and 1910.

Born in Staincliffe in Batley, Yorkshire, Rothery was a right-handed batsman, who scored 4,619 runs at 20.99, with a highest score of 161 against Kent. He scored three centuries in all, the others coming against Hampshire and Derbyshire, plus twenty one fifties and took forty five catches. Rothery also took two wickets for 44 runs. He played one game of first-class cricket for J Bamford's XI; and for the Yorkshire Second XI (1900–1911), Yorkshire Cricket Council (1903) and Durham (1913) in other matches.

Rothery died in June 1919, in Beckett Park, Leeds, Yorkshire, aged 41, from wounds sustained from fighting in World War I.

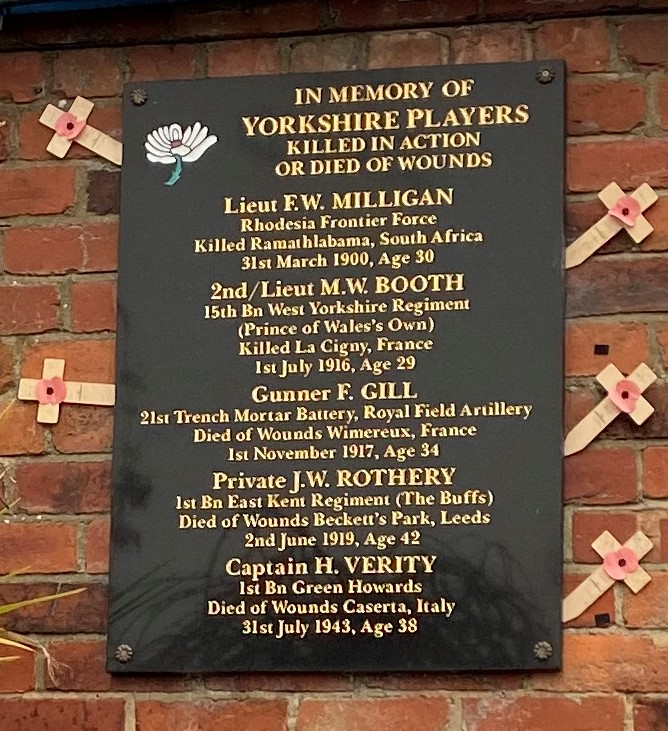
