= Charles Oyston =

English cricketer

Charles Oyston (12 May 1869 – 15 July 1942) was an English first-class cricketer, who played fifteen matches for Yorkshire County Cricket Club from 1900 to 1909. He also played in non first-class cricket for the Yorkshire Second XI (1900–1906) and RW Frank's XI (1906).

Born in Armley, Leeds, Yorkshire, England, Oyston was a slow left arm orthodox bowler, who took 31 wickets at 28.12, with a best of 3 for 30 against Worcestershire. A left-handed tail end batsman, he scored 96 runs at 7.38, with a top score of 22 against Derbyshire. He also took three catches in the field.

Oyston was a professional with Wortley C.C. in 1894, having played for Leeds Leamington C.C. in 1891. He also played for Armley C.C. and Morley C.C. He went on to be the professional with Bingley C.C. in 1917, but played mostly with Leeds C.C. and, in 1927, shared the Leeds League bowling prize with Bill Bowes.

He died in Armley in July 1942.
