= Paul Booth (cricketer) =

English cricketer

Paul Antony Booth (born 5 September 1965, Crossland Moor, Huddersfield, Yorkshire, England) is a former English first-class cricketer. Booth was a left-arm orthodox spinner and left-handed batsman.

== Career ==
At the age of nine he played for Meltham under-13s. When 16, he was apprenticed as a joiner, and was three days past his 17th birthday, he made his debut for Yorkshire.

He played twenty three games for Yorkshire from 1982 to 1989, and thirty seven for Warwickshire from 1990 to 1993, taking 107 wickets in his career at 40.19 with a best of 5 for 98. A lower order batsman, he made 830 runs in total, with a best of 62, at 13.38. He played in 19 List A matches in his career, including games for the Yorkshire Cricket Board in 2000 and 2001. He represented England Young Cricketers in two Youth Test matches in the West Indies in 1984/85.
