= William Blackburn (cricketer) =

English cricketer

William Edward Blackburn (24 November 1888 – 3 June 1941) was an English amateur first-class cricketer, who played ten matches for the Yorkshire County Cricket Club between 1919 and 1920.

Born in Clitheroe, Lancashire, England, Blackburn was a right-handed batsman, who scored 26 runs with a highest score of six not out, at an average of 3.71. His right-arm fast medium bowling took 45 wickets at an average of 24.73, with a best return of five wickets for seventeen runs.

Blackburn died in June 1941 in Heaton, Bolton, Lancashire, aged 52.
