= Herbert Walton (cricketer) =

English cricketer

Herbert Walton (21 May 1868, Scarborough – 28 February 1930) was an English first-class cricketer who played one match for Yorkshire County Cricket Club in 1893.

Despite taking five wickets against Liverpool and District with his right-arm fast-medium pace at an average of 27, this proved to be his only first-class appearance. He scored 5 in his only innings. He also made non-first-class appearances for Yorkshire Seconds and Yorkshire Colts against Durham, and in two matches for Scarborough against The Netherlands on their tour of 1892.
