= Ryan Gibson (English cricketer) =

English cricketer (born 1996)

Personal information
- Full name: Ryan Gibson
- Born: 22 January 1996 (age 30); Staithes, North Yorkshire, England
- Height: 6 ft 5 in (1.96 m)
- Batting: Right-handed
- Bowling: Right-arm medium
- Role: All-rounder

Domestic team information
- Years: Team
- 2013–2017: Yorkshire (squad no. 24)
- Only FC: 26 June 2016 Yorkshire v Pakistan A
- LA debut: 9 June 2013 Yorkshire v Leicestershire

Career statistics
Competition	FC	LA	T20
Matches	1	6	3
Runs scored	0	19	32
Batting average	0.00	6.33	16.00
100s/50s	3/7	0/0	0/0
Top score	0	9	18
Balls bowled	72	174	18
Wickets	1	5	0
Bowling average	42.00	31.60	–
5 wickets in innings	0	0	–
10 wickets in match	0	0	–
Best bowling	1/42	1/17	–
Catches/stumpings	0/–	1/–	1/–
- Source: CricketArchive, 27 May 2017

Ryan Gibson (born 22 January 1996) is an English cricketer who played for Yorkshire County Cricket Club. A right-arm medium bowler, Gibson has played one day cricket since June 2013, having progressed through the Yorkshire Under-14s, Yorkshire Under-15s and Yorkshire Under-17s into the Yorkshire Academy and Yorkshire 2nd XI. He also plays for the England Under-19s.

Gibson is from Staithes, North Yorkshire, England and is a former pupil of Fyling Hall School.
