= Joseph Threapleton =

English cricketer

Joseph William Threapleton (20 July 1857 – 30 July 1918) was an English first-class cricketer, who played one match for Yorkshire County Cricket Club, against Sussex, at Bramall Lane in 1881.

Born in Pudsey, Yorkshire, England, Threapleton was a wicket-keeper, who took two catches and completed one stumping, plus scored an unbeaten eight in his only innings. Yorkshire won the match by nine wickets. Threapleton was engaged by the Bradford C.C. in the 1880s and, from 1890 until 1894, he was with Harrogate C.C.. He kept wicket regularly for the Yorkshire Second XI. He was a boot maker by trade.

He died in July 1918 in Pudsey.
