= Frank Greenwood =

English cricketer

Frank Edwards Greenwood (28 September 1905 – 30 July 1963) was an English first-class cricketer, who played 57 games for Yorkshire County Cricket Club between 1929 and 1932. The tradition of the time demanded that Yorkshire have an amateur captain and Greenwood was appointed skipper in 1931, when he was also awarded his cap, and 1932. He missed parts of the 1932 season through injury, Brian Sellers captaining in his stead, and Greenwood resigned at the end of the season.

Born in Birkby, Huddersfield, Yorkshire, England, Greenwood was a right-handed batsman, who scored 1,558 runs at 26.86, with his only century (104 not out), coming against Glamorgan. He took two wickets with his occasional right arm medium pace, at a cost of 34.50.

Greenwood died at Huddersfield Royal Infirmary, Lindley, on 30 July 1963, aged 59.
