= Andrew Dalton (cricketer) =

English cricketer

Personal information
- Full name: Andrew John Dalton
- Born: 14 March 1947 (age 79); Horsforth, Yorkshire, England
- Batting: Right-handed

Domestic team information
- Years: Team
- 1969–1972: Yorkshire

Career statistics
| Competition | First-class | List A |
|---|---|---|
| Matches | 21 | 17 |
| Runs scored | 710 | 280 |
| Batting average | 24.48 | 18.66 |
| 100s/50s | 3/– | –/1 |
| Top score | 128 | 55 |
| Catches/stumpings | 6/– | 7/– |
- Source: Cricinfo, 8 May 2023

Andrew John Dalton (born 14 March 1947, Horsforth, Yorkshire, England) was an English first-class cricketer, who played twenty one first-class, and seventeen one day matches, for Yorkshire County Cricket Club between 1969 and 1972.

A right-handed batsman, he scored 710 first-class runs at 24.48, with a best score of 128 against Middlesex. He scored his other first-class centuries against Worcestershire and Oxford University. He scored 280 one day runs, with a top score of 55.

Dalton also played for Yorkshire Second XI from 1965 to 1972. In 1975 he was professional for South Northumberland, in 1976 played for Leeds in the Yorkshire League and from 1977 Undercliffe in the Bradford League, where he was the top scorer in the league in his first season.
