= Arthur Dobson (cricketer) =

English cricketer

Arthur Dobson (22 February 1854 – 17 September 1932) was an English first-class cricketer, who played two matches for Yorkshire in 1879, against the Marylebone Cricket Club (MCC) and Surrey. A right-handed batsman and right arm medium pacer, he scored one run in his three innings, and did not get a bowl.

Born in Ilkley, Yorkshire, England, Dobson died in September 1932 in Horsforth, Leeds, Yorkshire.
