= Thomas Pride (cricketer) =

English cricketer

Thomas Pride (23 July 1864 – 16 February 1919) was an English first-class cricketer, who played one match for Yorkshire County Cricket Club in 1887, in a drawn game against Sussex at the County Cricket Ground, Hove.

Born in York, England, Pride was a wicket-keeper, who took four catches and completed three stumpings in his only appearance, although he only scored one run in his solitary innings, batting right-handed.

Around 1887, Pride went to Edinburgh Presbyterian College to qualify as a schoolmaster, and eventually became head of Canonbie School. He played for Perthshire, and also for Scotland from 1890 to 1894. In 1894, at Beverley, East Yorkshire, he scored 201 for York C.C., then a record for the ground. He also played for Castle Burton C.C. in the North Yorkshire and Durham League.

He died in February 1919 in Canonbie, Dumfries, Scotland.
