= Charles Grimshaw (cricketer) =

English cricketer

Charles Henry Grimshaw (12 May 1880 – 25 September 1947) was an English first-class cricketer, who played for Yorkshire County Cricket Club between 1904 and 1908.

Born in Calverley, Pudsey, Yorkshire, Grimshaw was a left-handed batsman, who scored 1,219 runs at 17.92, with a highest score of 85 against Oxford University. He also posted half centuries against Ireland, Somerset and Worcestershire. He took 42 catches and seven wickets with his occasional slow left arm orthodox spin, at an average of 31.57. His best figures of 2 for 23 were taken against Warwickshire. He also played for the Yorkshire Second XI in the Minor Counties Championship.

Grimshaw died in Calverley in September 1947.
