= George Deyes =

English cricketer

George Deyes (11 February 1879 – 11 January 1963) was an English first-class cricketer, who played seventeen matches for Yorkshire County Cricket Club between 1905 and 1907.

Born in Southcoates, Hull, East Riding of Yorkshire, Deyes was a right arm fast bowler, who took 41 wickets at an average of 23.02. He had a best of 6 for 62 against Ireland, and took 5 for 75 in a County Championship game against Somerset. A right-handed tail-ender, he scored 44 runs at 2.20, with a first-class career best innings score of 12.

He also played for the Yorkshire Second XI (1903–1907) and Staffordshire (1910–1913).

Deyes died in January 1963 in Tipperlinn, Edinburgh, Midlothian.
