= Arthur Rhodes (cricketer) =

English cricketer

Arthur Cecil Rhodes (14 October 1906 – 21 May 1957) was an English first-class cricketer, who played 61 matches for Yorkshire County Cricket Club between 1932 and 1934.

Born in Headingley, Leeds, Rhodes was a right arm fast medium bowler, who took 107 wickets at 28.28, with a best of 6 for 19 against Cambridge University, one of five hauls of five wickets in an innings. A right-handed batsman, he scored 917 runs at 17.98, with a best score of 64 not out against Leicestershire. He also scored 53 against Hampshire. Rhodes also played for the Yorkshire Second XI from 1931 to 1934. He won his Yorkshire cap in 1932 having reportedly 'filled a place' during that season.

Rhodes died in Headingley in May 1957, aged 50.
