= Charles Midgley =

English cricketer

Charles Augustus Midgley (11 November 1877 – 24 June 1942) was an English first-class cricketer, who played four matches for Yorkshire County Cricket Club in 1906.

He was born in Wetherby, Yorkshire, England, and was a right arm fast bowler. He took 8 wickets at 18.62, with a best return of 2 for 18 against Middlesex. A right-handed batsman, he scored 115 runs at 28.75, with his top score of 59 not out against Derbyshire. He took three catches in the field. He also played for the Yorkshire Second XI in 1904, and Major Shaw's XI in 1906.

Midgley died in June 1942 in Bradford, Yorkshire.
