= Francis Baines (cricketer) =

English cricketer

Francis Edmund Baines (18 June 1864 – 17 November 1948) was an English amateur first-class cricketer, who played in the drawn 1888 Roses match for Yorkshire against Lancashire, played at Bramall Lane, Sheffield. A right-handed batsman and right arm medium-fast bowler, Baines was bowled for a duck by Napier, and not called upon to bowl. This was his only first-class game.

Baines was born in Ecclesall, Sheffield, and died in Worksop, Nottinghamshire, at the age of 84.
