= William Woodhouse (cricketer) =

English cricketer

William Henry Woodhouse (16 April 1856 – 4 March 1938) was an English amateur first-class cricketer, who played nine matches for Yorkshire County Cricket Club in 1884 and 1885.

Born in Bradford, Yorkshire, Woodhouse was a right-handed batsman, he scored 218 runs with a best score of 63 against Sussex. He also scored 62 against Gloucestershire. He took six catches in the field.

He died in Bradford in March 1938, aged 81.
