= Neil Nicholson (cricketer) =

English cricketer (born 1963)

Neil George Nicholson (born 17 October 1963, Whitby, North Yorkshire, England) is an English former first-class cricketer, who played five games for Yorkshire County Cricket Club in 1988 and 1989, when he also played in two one day games. He scored a total of 134 first-class runs at 26.80, with a best of 56 not out, and he also took five catches. Nicholson failed to take a wicket in five overs of medium pace.

He appeared for the Yorkshire Second XI from 1983 to 1990.
