= Thomas Darnton =

English cricketer

Thomas Darnton (12 February 1836 – 25 October 1874) was an English first-class cricketer. He played thirteen matches for Yorkshire County Cricket Club between 1858 and 1868, and 20 first-class games overall.

Darnton was born in Stockton-on-Tees. He took 18 wickets with his right arm, round arm medium paced bowling at 27.33, and scored 402 runs at an average of 12.18, with a top score of 81* out of 144 for Yorkshire against an All England XI in 1865. His best innings was made in vain however as Yorkshire lost by an innings. He became the second Yorkshire player to carry his bat through an innings.

He also played for Yorkshire and Durham (1858), Yorkshire with Stockton-on-Tees (1861), England (1864–1865), North of England (1864) and the United England Eleven (1866–1868). He also played for Guisborough.

He died aged 38, in October 1874 in his home town of Stockton-on-Tees.
