= Brian Sellers =

English cricketer

Personal information
- Full name: Arthur Brian Sellers
- Born: 5 March 1907; Keighley, Yorkshire, England
- Died: 20 February 1981 (aged 73); Eldwick, West Yorkshire
- Batting: Right-handed
- Bowling: Right-arm off-break
- Role: Batsman, captain
- Relatives: Arthur Sellers (father)

Domestic team information
- Years: Team
- 1932–1948: Yorkshire

Career statistics
Competition	First-class
Matches	344
Runs scored	9270
Batting average	23.05
100s/50s	4/45
Top score	204
Balls bowled	1213
Wickets	9
Bowling average	75.11
5 wickets in innings	–
10 wickets in match	–
Best bowling	2/10
Catches/stumpings	273/–
- Source: Cricinfo, 22 June 2013

Arthur Brian Sellers (5 March 1907 – 20 February 1981) was an English amateur first-class cricketer, who played in 334 first-class matches for Yorkshire County Cricket Club between 1932 and 1948, and later became a prominent administrator at the club.

== Career ==
Sellers was born in Keighley, Yorkshire, England, and was a middle-order right-handed batsman of modest attainments, and close fielder. His cricketing significance relates almost entirely to his captaincy of the successful Yorkshire side, both before and after World War II. He played regularly for Yorkshire in 1932, and often captained the side in his debut season in the absence of the regular captain, Frank Greenwood. When Greenwood resigned at the end of that season, Sellers was appointed captain for 1933, and then held the post until 1948, when he retired.

During Sellers' ten seasons of captaincy, Yorkshire won the County Championship six times, making him one of the most successful county captains of all time, rivalled only by Lord Hawke and Stuart Surridge. Intensely competitive, Sellers led by example in the field, where he always fielded close to the bat, and though his batting figures were modest – he hit 1,000 runs in a season only three times, despite regularly playing more than 30 matches a season, and made only four centuries in his career – he tended to make runs when they were needed. His score of 204, playing against Cambridge University in 1936, was the only double-century recorded by any Yorkshire amateur player. His Yorkshire teams included many England players, including Herbert Sutcliffe, Leonard Hutton, Hedley Verity, Bill Bowes and Maurice Leyland.

After leading Yorkshire to the Championship title for three consecutive years to 1939, Sellers was named as a Wisden Cricketer of the Year in the 1940 edition of Wisden Cricketers' Almanack.

Both during his playing career and afterwards, Sellers was an England Test team selector (1938–55), and in retirement he served on Yorkshire committees, taking a prominent and influential role in many of the controversies that surrounded the county club in the 1960 and early 1970s.

Sellers died in February 1981, at Eldwick, Bingley, Yorkshire.
