= Robert Frank (cricketer) =

English cricketer

Robert Wilson Frank (29 May 1864 – 9 September 1950) was an English amateur first-class cricketer, who played eighteen matches for Yorkshire County Cricket Club, and once for I Zingari, between 1889 and 1903.

Born in Pickering, North Yorkshire, England, Frank was a right-handed batsman, who scored 430 runs at 15.92, with a top score of 92. An occasional right arm slow bowler, he bowled only ten balls at a cost of nine runs. He was capped by Yorkshire. He also played for the Yorkshire Second XI from 1901 to 1913, the North of England in 1894, and for Northallerton and District in 1903.

Frank died in September 1950, aged 86, in Pickering.
