= Herbert Sutcliffe =

English cricketer (1894–1978)

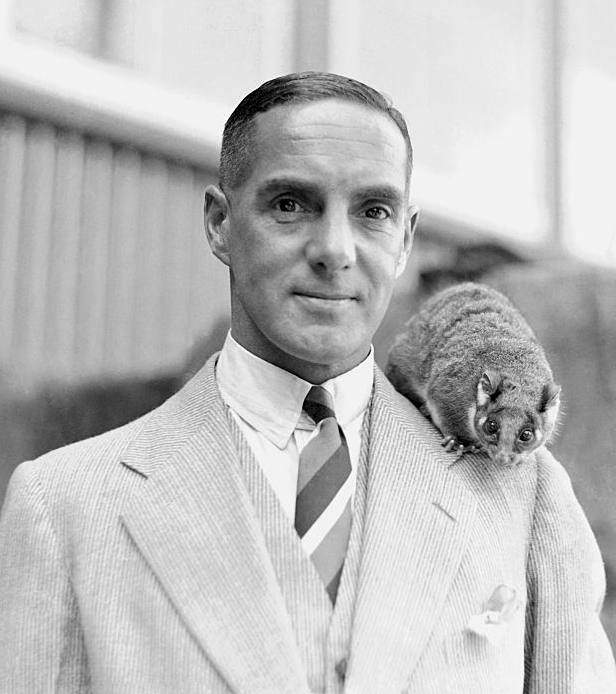
- Sutcliffe in 1933

Personal information
- Full name: Herbert Sutcliffe
- Born: 24 November 1894; Summerbridge, Nidderdale, West Riding of Yorkshire, England
- Died: 22 January 1978 (aged 83); Cross Hills, North Yorkshire, England
- Batting: Right-handed
- Bowling: Right-arm medium
- Role: Batsman
- Relatives: Billy Sutcliffe (son)

International information
- National side: England
- Test debut (cap 215): 14 June 1924 v South Africa
- Last Test: 29 June 1935 v South Africa

Domestic team information
- Years: Team
- 1919–1945: Yorkshire
- 1924–1933: MCC

Career statistics
Competition	Test	First-class
Matches	54	754^{[a]}
Runs scored	4,555	50,670
Batting average	60.73	52.02
100s/50s	16/23	151/229
Top score	194	313
Balls bowled	–	993
Wickets	–	14
Bowling average	–	40.21
5 wickets in innings	–	0
10 wickets in match	–	0
Best bowling	–	3/15
Catches/stumpings	23/–	474/–
- Source: CricketArchive, 17 September 2009

Herbert Sutcliffe (24 November 1894 – 22 January 1978) was an English cricketer who represented Yorkshire and England as an opening batsman. Apart from one match in 1945, his first-class career spanned the interwar period. His first-class debut was delayed by the First World War until 1919 and his career was effectively terminated in August 1939 when he was called up for military service in the imminent Second World War. He was the first cricketer to score 16 centuries in Test match cricket. He is most famous for being the partner of Jack Hobbs, and their batting partnership is often regarded as one the greatest ever.

A right-handed batsman, Sutcliffe was noted for his concentration and determination, qualities which made him invaluable to his teams in adverse batting conditions; and he is remembered as one of the game's finest "bad wicket batsmen". His fame rests mainly in the great opening partnership he formed with Jack Hobbs for England between 1924 and 1930. He also formed notable opening partnerships at Yorkshire with Percy Holmes and, in his last few seasons, the young Len Hutton. During Sutcliffe's career, Yorkshire won the County Championship 12 times. Sutcliffe played in 54 Test matches for England and on three occasions he toured Australia, where he enjoyed outstanding success. His last tour in 1932–33 included the controversial "bodyline" series, in which Sutcliffe is perceived to have been one of Douglas Jardine's main supporters. Although close friends have stated that Sutcliffe did not approve of bodyline, he always acted out of fierce loyalty to his team captain and was committed to his team's cause. In statistical terms, Sutcliffe was one of the most successful Test batsmen ever; his completed career batting average was 60.73 which as of January 2026 is the highest by any English batsman and the sixth-highest worldwide (of Test batsmen with 20 completed innings) behind only Don Bradman, Kamindu Mendis (currently active), Adam Voges, Graeme Pollock and George Headley.

Sutcliffe became a successful businessman early in his first-class career by using the money he earned as a player to establish a sportswear shop in Leeds. When his playing career ended, he served on the club committee at Yorkshire for 21 years and for three years was an England Test selector. Among the honours accorded him have been the commemoration of a special set of gates in his name at Headingley, home of Yorkshire County Cricket Club, and his induction into the ICC Cricket Hall of Fame.

== Early years ==
=== Childhood ===
Herbert Sutcliffe was born in Summerbridge, Nidderdale, West Riding of Yorkshire on 24 November 1894 at his parents' home, a cottage in Gabblegate (now called East View). His parents were Willie and Jane Sutcliffe. Herbert was the second of three sons, his brothers being Arthur and Bob. Willie Sutcliffe, who worked at a sawmill in nearby Dacre Banks, was a keen club cricketer.

When Herbert was still a baby the family moved to Pudsey, where Willie's father was the landlord of the King's Arms. Willie worked in the pub and played cricket for the well-known Pudsey St Lawrence Cricket Club. He also played rugby football, and an injury sustained during a rugby match led to his premature death in 1898.

Jane Sutcliffe moved the family back to Nidderdale, where they lived in Darley, the boys enrolling at Darley School, and she remarried. Jane developed consumption, and she died in January 1904 at the age of 37, when Herbert was nine. Jane's second husband, a bootmaker named Tom Waller, was not allowed custody of the brothers, who moved back to Pudsey to be cared for by the Sutcliffe family. Willie Sutcliffe had three sisters, Hannah, Caroline and Harriet, who ran a bakery. They became the legal guardians of Arthur, Herbert and Bob, respectively.

As the three aunts were devoted members of the local Congregational Church, the three boys received religious instruction there and Herbert became a lifelong committed Christian. He was a Sunday School teacher as a young man and first came to notice as a cricketer when he played for a church team. The boys lived in the family house which contained the bakery and slept in a loft above the bakehouse itself.

Herbert left school in 1908 when he was 13, and was apprenticed to a boot and shoe company as a "clicker" who fastened boot soles to uppers. In 1911, his prowess at cricket earned him an offer of clerical employment in a local textile mill, where he learned bookkeeping, a skill that served him well when he launched his own business career.

=== Development as a cricketer ===
Sutcliffe became seriously interested in cricket at the age of eight, soon after he returned to Pudsey during his mother's final illness. He formed an ambition to follow his father and two uncles and play for Pudsey St Lawrence. His first club was a Wesleyan church team in the neighbouring village of Stanningley, where he was first seen as a bowler rather than a batsman. In one match in 1907, he took all 10 wickets in an innings.

In 1908, now aged 13, he began playing for Pudsey St Lawrence's second team. In the following year Sutcliffe made his first-team debut. Two of his team-mates were Major Booth and Henry Hutton, father of Len Hutton.

In 1911, now aged 16, Sutcliffe switched his allegiance to the rival Pudsey Britannia club where, he is quoted as saying, "my batting improved by leaps and bounds". This move came about because of the offer of clerical employment at the textile mill, which was owned by Ernest Walker who was also the Britannia club captain. Sutcliffe later said that Walker allowed him more time for cricket practice than he could get from his bootmaking job.

The following season, Sutcliffe's progress was noted by Yorkshire County Cricket Club and he was invited to take part in the county team practice sessions at Headingley. He was welcomed by the great George Herbert Hirst, who gave him much encouragement and advice. Soon afterwards, he was invited to play for the Yorkshire 2nd XI team.

Sutcliffe was coached at Headingley by Hirst and the club's 2nd XI coach, Steve Doughty, who placed great emphasis on the importance of pad play (the use of the pads to intercept the ball and prevent it hitting the wicket when this would not risk being out leg before wicket). Although Doughty's approach was criticised by Sutcliffe's colleagues at Pudsey Britannia, Sutcliffe himself had no regrets about the time he spent mastering the technique and later explained that swing bowling had been so well developed by bowlers in every county team that it was impossible for any batsman to keep his wicket by relying on his bat alone. The long-term benefit he derived was a very strong defence that he later used to great effect on treacherous pitches.

By 1914, Sutcliffe had become the most accomplished player in the Bradford League in which Pudsey Britannia played. He was playing for both Yorkshire 2nd XI and Pudsey Britannia at this time. In August, just as the First World War was beginning, he appeared for the 2nd XI at Beverley against an East Riding XI and opened the batting for the first time as a Yorkshire player. He made a half-century in the second innings, and the Cricket Argus commented that "he was confident and stylish in... his best performance for the second eleven". The Argus went on to say that Sutcliffe, with youth on his side, "looks every inch a cricketer (with) a variety of good strokes". In the Bradford League, Sutcliffe scored a then-record 727 runs in the season, which was beaten in 1916 by his future England opening partner Jack Hobbs.

=== Military service and demobilisation ===
Sutcliffe was called up in 1915 and served first with the Royal Army Ordnance Corps, stationed at York, and then with the Sherwood Foresters. He was later commissioned into the Green Howards, now part of the Yorkshire Regiment, as a Second Lieutenant, but he did not see active service and was not posted to France until after the Armistice was signed.

Sutcliffe played cricket during the war for the Officer Cadet Battalion in Scotland, captaining his team in matches against Glasgow University and other Scottish teams. He still managed to play in the Bradford League on occasion, but he said that he sometimes did so under an assumed name after taking unofficial leave.

Sutcliffe was demobilised in 1919 and took a job as a colliery checkweighman at Allerton Bywater in Yorkshire. He was contracted to play for the colliery's cricket team in the Yorkshire Council league, but he was selected at the beginning of the 1919 season to play again for Yorkshire 2nd XI. However, he retained the colliery job until he opened his sportswear shop in 1924.

=== First-class debut ===
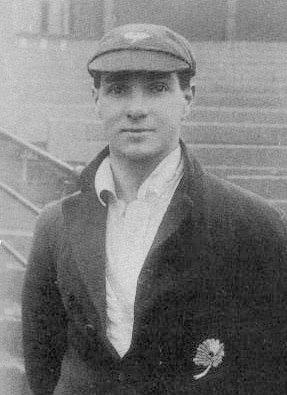
Herbert Sutcliffe in the early years of his first-class career

The war had delayed the start of Sutcliffe's first-class career with Yorkshire, and he was 24 when his chance finally came. In May 1919, he played for the county's 2nd XI against a full-strength 1st XI and did very well, scoring 51 not out. He received a good report in the Yorkshire Post and never played for the 2nd XI again. Yorkshire's first County Championship fixture after the war took place on 26 and 27 May at Bristol against Gloucestershire and Sutcliffe, batting at number six, made his first-class debut. Yorkshire batted first, after losing the toss, and Sutcliffe made 11 in a total of 277 (Roy Kilner 112). Despite that seemingly modest score, Yorkshire won by an innings and 63 runs as Gloucestershire were bowled out twice, for 125 and 89.

== 1919 to 1927 ==
Sutcliffe kept his place in the Yorkshire team and continued to bat in the middle of the order for a month until, in the match against Nottinghamshire at Bramall Lane on 27 and 28 June, Wilfred Rhodes decided to drop down the order for the second innings, and Sutcliffe went in first with Percy Holmes. After some indifferent scores, he completed his maiden first-class century on 23 and 24 July against Northamptonshire at Northampton when he and Holmes put on 279 for the first wicket, Sutcliffe scoring 145 and Holmes 133. Further success resulted in Holmes and Sutcliffe being awarded their county caps in August 1919. Sutcliffe created a debut season record by scoring 1,839 runs at an average of 44.85, with five centuries and a highest score of 174 against Kent at Crabble Athletic Ground in Dover. Holmes and Sutcliffe scored five centuries each in 1919, and they shared in five century partnerships. Their performances were key to Yorkshire winning the championship that season for the 10th time in all.

As a result of their success in 1919, Percy Holmes and Herbert Sutcliffe were both awarded a Wisden Cricketer of the Year title in 1920. In the accompanying review, Wisden commented on Sutcliffe's pre-war development and the benefits that both he and Holmes derived from Steve Doughty's coaching. Sutcliffe's "fine driving" was commended but it was noted that "he may not yet be quite so strong in defence".

By his 1919 standards, Sutcliffe had two quiet years in 1920 and 1921. He was well down the national averages in 1920 with 1,393 runs at 33.16, with four centuries and a highest score of 131. In 1921, he did not score a century and made 1,235 runs at 30.12.

In 1922, as Yorkshire regained the County Championship title under new captain Geoffrey Wilson, Sutcliffe lived up to his early promise by scoring 2,020 runs at 46.97 with a highest score of 232 against Surrey at the Oval. He scored 11 half-centuries but only two centuries. Sutcliffe was one of seven Yorkshire players who were ever-present, playing in all 30 matches.

Sutcliffe's career advanced in 1923 when he made his first appearances in the North v South and Gentlemen v Players fixtures and in a Test Trial. His overall record in 1923 was 2,220 runs at 41.11, with three centuries, 15 fifties and a highest score of 139 against Somerset. The Yorkshire cricket historian Alfred Pullin wrote: "it was recognised long before the season ended that Sutcliffe had established his claim to be considered one of England's first-wicket batsmen".

In the 1924 season, Yorkshire completed a hat-trick of championships under Geoffrey Wilson; and Sutcliffe enjoyed probably his best season to date, scoring 2,142 runs at 48.68, with six centuries including a highest score of 255 not out against Essex. He made his Test debut on Saturday, 14 June 1924, playing for England against South Africa at Edgbaston and opening the innings with Jack Hobbs. In this First Test, which England won by an innings, they recorded their first century partnership for England by putting on 136 before Sutcliffe was out for 64. In the Second Test at Lord's, Hobbs and Sutcliffe scored 268 before Sutcliffe was out for 122, his maiden Test century; Hobbs went on to make 211 and England again won by an innings. In the whole series, Sutcliffe scored 303 runs at 75.75.

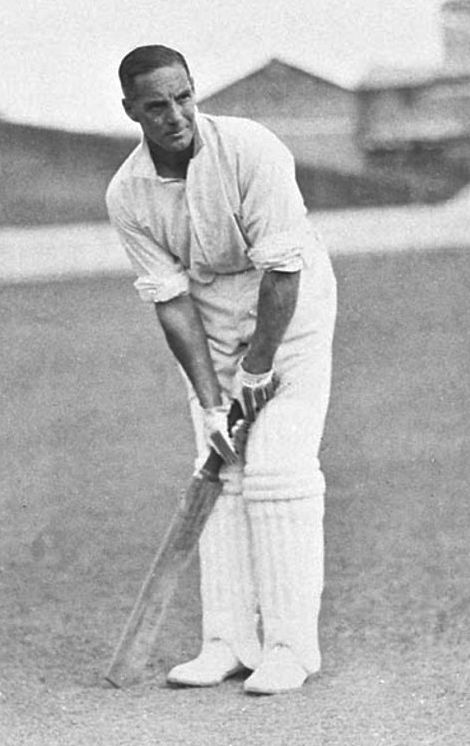
Herbert Sutcliffe during practice at Sydney Cricket Ground in 1924

As early as July, Sutcliffe was one of ten players named to tour Australia in the winter of 1924–25 under the leadership of Arthur Gilligan. At first, Hobbs declined the tour but then changed his mind when it was decided his wife would accompany him. The importance of this to Sutcliffe was that his partnership with Hobbs could continue at the very highest level of cricket where the presence of Hobbs was ultimately the key factor in Sutcliffe's major success on the tour, which established him as a world-class player. Sutcliffe said he had some initial difficulty in adjusting to Australian conditions, specifically the strong light which affected his timing. He also reckoned that the pitches were a good four yards faster than in England. His remedy was to play straight and by hitting the ball back down the pitch. He said later that he sacrificed many of his best shots, but "it paid off in the end". This is shown by his overall performance as, although England lost the series 4–1, Sutcliffe scored 734 runs in the five Tests at an average of 81.55 with 4 centuries, 2 half-centuries and a highest score of 176. In the whole tour, he scored 1,250 runs at 69.44 with 5 centuries and a highest score of 188.

In 1925, as Yorkshire won a 4th successive championship, Sutcliffe scored 2,308 runs at 53.67 with 7 centuries and a highest score of 235 against Middlesex at Headingley. During 1925 and 1926, Sutcliffe's skill was a primary factor in Yorkshire having the longest unbeaten run in county cricket: i.e., 70 matches without loss until early 1927. After three defeats in 1927, Yorkshire went a further 58 games without loss until 1929.

The first four Tests of the 1926 England v Australia series were scheduled for just three days and were all curtailed by poor weather. The final Test at the Oval was timeless to ensure a finish. It has become one of the most famous matches in cricket history, not because England regained the Ashes for the first time since 1912 but for the manner it which it was achieved as Hobbs and Sutcliffe produced their most famous partnership in treacherous batting conditions. Australia had a narrow first innings lead of 22 and, at close of play on the second day (a Monday), Hobbs and Sutcliffe had taken the England second innings score to 49–0, a lead of 27. Heavy rain fell overnight and next day, as the sun shone, the pitch soon developed into a "sticky wicket" on which it was generally assumed that England would be bowled out cheaply and so lose both the match and the series. But, in spite of the very difficult batting conditions, Hobbs and Sutcliffe put up a great defence of their wickets, and gradually increased their partnership to 172 before Hobbs was out for exactly 100. Sutcliffe went on to make 161; in the end, England won the game comfortably, by 289 runs, and regained the Ashes. The tributes paid to Hobbs and Sutcliffe after this partnership are extensive. Pelham Warner perhaps encapsulated them all when he wrote: "Hobbs and Sutcliffe won it for us by their incomparable batting. They did not fail us at a time of most desperate crisis. Never has English cricket known a more dauntless pair".

In the 1926 County Championship, Yorkshire lost the title despite being unbeaten to their close rivals Lancashire by a very narrow margin. Sutcliffe was second in the national batting averages behind Hobbs, scoring 2,528 runs at 66.52, with eight centuries and a highest score of exactly 200 against Leicestershire. In the 1927 County Championship, Yorkshire finished third; but it was another great season for both Holmes and Sutcliffe who scored over 4,500 runs and 12 centuries between them. Sutcliffe scored 2,414 runs at 56.13, with six centuries and a highest score of 227 for England versus The Rest.

In the autumn of 1927, the Yorkshire committee decided to appoint Sutcliffe as team captain in succession to Arthur Lupton, who had retired. He would thus have become the first professional to captain the side since 1882 but, as Wisden records, "objection was taken to this action by two different parties". There were those who supported the view that no professional should be captain; and significant opposition also came from a large number of members who argued that, if a professional were to be appointed, it should be Wilfred Rhodes rather than Sutcliffe. Sutcliffe himself was en route to South Africa while most of the furore developed and had to rely on telegrams for his news. When first advised of the appointment, he sent a reply that spoke of the great honour and his desire to serve Yorkshire and England. But he was better apprised of the controversy when he arrived in Cape Town and finally sent a message that he was declining the offer but was willing to serve under any other captain.

== 1928 to 1932 ==
During the five years 1928 to 1932, Sutcliffe played 181 matches (254 innings) in which he was not out 36 times, scoring 15,529 runs for a total average of 70.35.

Sutcliffe made his only tour of South Africa in 1927–28, playing in 14 matches and scoring 1,030 runs at 51.50, with two centuries and a highest score of 102. He was able to open the England innings with Holmes, Hobbs having declined the tour, and made his score of 102 in the first innings of the First Test at the Old Wanderers ground in Johannesburg, England winning by 10 wickets.

In 1928, Sutcliffe scored 3,000 runs in a season for the first time, a feat he repeated in 1931 and 1932, becoming the first player to achieve it three times. Only Patsy Hendren and Wally Hammond have equalled the feat. Sutcliffe's 1928 tally was 3,002 at 76.97, with a highest score of 228 among 13 centuries and 13 half-centuries. He played in all three Tests against West Indies in 1928. This was West Indies' inaugural Test series and their batsmen struggled against a strong England attack so that England was able to win all three Tests by an innings. But Sutcliffe was very impressed by the fast bowling of Learie Constantine, George Francis and Herman Griffith and said of them during the Lord's Test that he had "never played finer fast bowling".

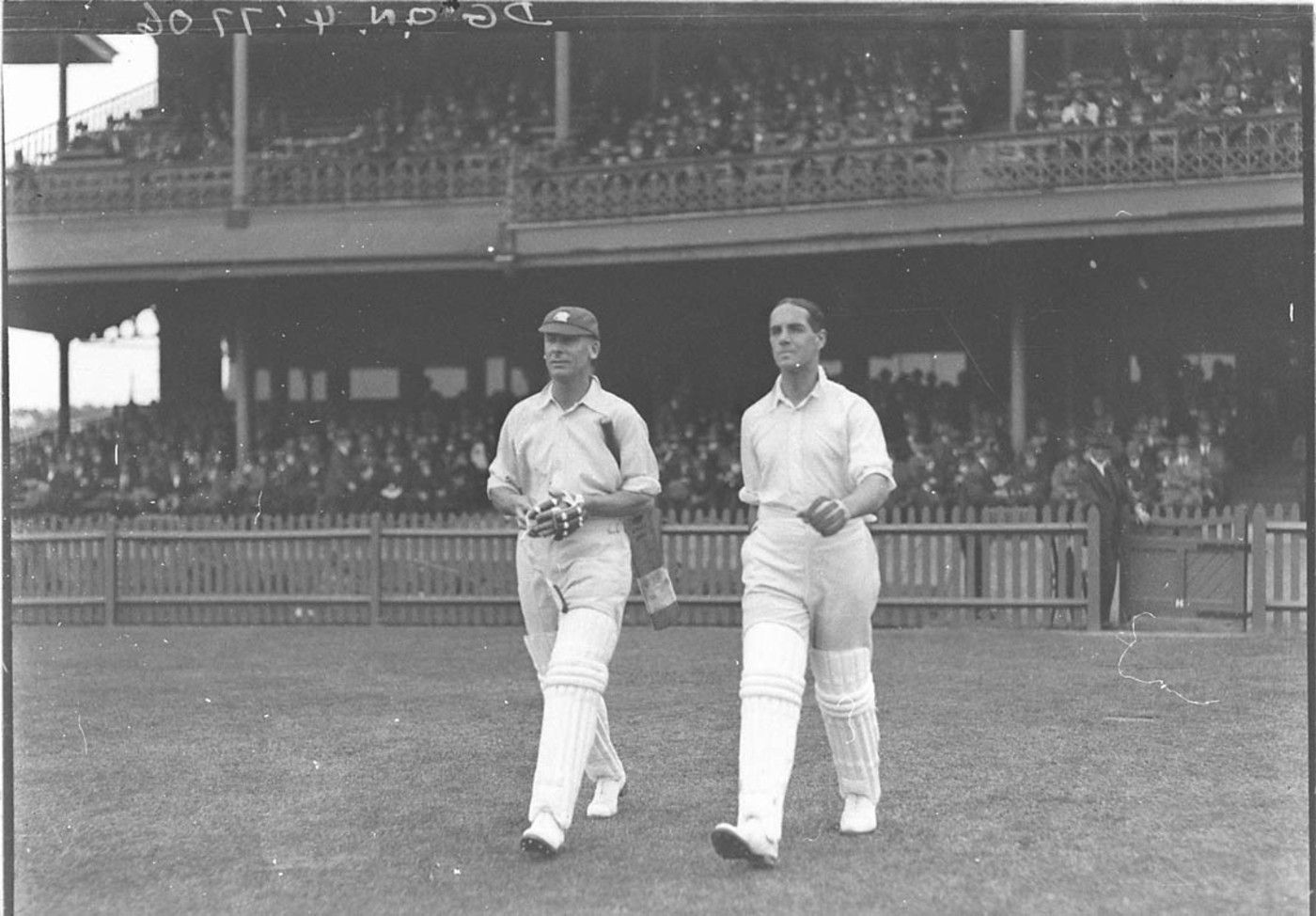
Jack Hobbs (left) and Herbert Sutcliffe at the Sydney Cricket Ground

Under the leadership of Percy Chapman, Sutcliffe toured Australia again in 1928–29 with Hobbs as his opening partner. England won the first two Tests before Hobbs and Sutcliffe played major roles in one of the most famous Test matches ever at Melbourne. Australia won the toss and batted first, making 397 thanks to centuries by Alan Kippax and Jack Ryder. England scored 417, with 200 by Hammond and 58 by Sutcliffe. Australia then scored 351, with 107 by their captain Bill Woodfull and a maiden Test century by Don Bradman. This left England needing 332 to win. Australia had ended the fifth day of a timeless match on 347–8, and the pitch was showing increasing signs of wear. Overnight, a storm broke and soaked the pitch which, as the sun shone on it through the morning, became what Bradman later described as "the worst sticky I ever saw". Even Wisden admitted that it "may fittingly be described as a beastly wicket". Play on the sixth day did not begin until 12:51, and Australia's last two wickets quickly fell with just 4 runs added to their overnight total. Clem Hill reckoned that the state of the pitch was such that "odds of ten to one against an England success would be generous" and Hugh Trumble reportedly told Jack Hobbs that 70 would be a good total. Wisden recorded that "then it was that the wonderful skill of these two (Hobbs and Sutcliffe) showed itself so prominently for, with the ball turning and getting up almost straight, they put on 105 for the first wicket... the two batsmen rendered England splendid service by an historic stand and made victory probable". Having survived the last five minutes before lunch, they added 75 in the afternoon session when "the ball was turning and at other times getting up almost straight". Hobbs had nearly been dismissed early on when a catch was dropped but the two batsmen played with "remarkable footwork, masterly defence and unerring skill in a difficult situation". Hobbs was out when the score had reached 105 and then Sutcliffe added another 94 in partnership with Douglas Jardine as the wicket eased and close of play was safely reached with the total at 171–1 (Sutcliffe 83 not out). Next morning, with conditions much more favourable, Sutcliffe batted on until he was finally out for 135 with the total on 318–4 and only 14 more needed. There was a slight scare as three more wickets fell, including Chapman who was caught at cover when trying for the winning hit. But the runs were obtained and England had won a famous victory against the odds by 3 wickets. Sutcliffe later said that he considered this to have been his finest innings ever. Jardine later wrote about the number of times Hobbs and Sutcliffe were hit "all over the body" during their stand and made the point that, if a batsman is to make runs on an Australian sticky wicket, then being hit by the ball is inevitable.

In 1929, Sutcliffe scored five centuries against the South African tourists. The first was 113 for Yorkshire in a drawn match at Bramall Lane He then scored four in the Test series, including two in the same match in the Fifth Test at the Oval. His season aggregate was 2,189 runs at 52.11 with 9 centuries and a highest score of 150 against Northamptonshire.

In 1930, Sutcliffe was the leading Englishman in the first-class batting averages behind Don Bradman (i.e., of batsmen with 10 completed innings). In a summer of hot, thundery weather that produced some exceptionally bad pitches, Sutcliffe averaged 87.61 in the four Tests he played in, scoring 161 in the Fifth Test at the Oval. Sutcliffe's first-class aggregate in 1930 was 2,312 runs at 64.22, with six centuries and a highest score of 173 against Sussex.

During the winter of 1930–31, Hobbs and Sutcliffe went on a private tour of India and Ceylon that was organised by the Maharajkumar of Vizianagram (popularly known as "Vizzy"). There is debate in some quarters about the status of matches played on this tour, which are not recognised as first-class by Wisden in contrast to certain other publications.^{[a]} The scores were printed in The Cricketer Spring Annual in 1932 and presented as first-class, but escaped general notice at the time; and were largely ignored until some statisticians took an interest in them in the 1970s. It is known that neither Hobbs nor Sutcliffe thought they were first-class matches; they regarded them as exhibition games arranged for Vizzy's personal entertainment. Nevertheless, Sutcliffe scored 532 runs and two centuries in the disputed matches, and this has impacted his first-class statistical record – of which, therefore, two versions are in circulation.

In all first-class cricket in the 1931 season, Sutcliffe scored four centuries in consecutive innings and averaged 96.96, topping the first-class averages for the first time. He totalled 3,006 runs, with a highest score of 230 among 13 centuries. Yorkshire historian Jim Kilburn commented on Sutcliffe's general consistency as "almost past believing" while Sutcliffe himself reckoned that his accomplishments in 1931, which was a wet summer, were the best of his entire career.

When Yorkshire played Gloucestershire at Park Avenue, Bradford, in July 1932, Sutcliffe completed his 100th century. He was the first Yorkshire player and the seventh overall to achieve the feat. Having scored 83 in the first innings, he reached his target with 132 in the second. Yorkshire won the match by 133 runs. Yorkshire honoured the occasion by presenting Sutcliffe with a cheque for 100 guineas, repeating Surrey's reward paid to Jack Hobbs when he scored his 100th century. In Yorkshire's match against Essex at Leyton, Holmes and Sutcliffe set a world record partnership for any wicket of 555. This remained the world record for any wicket till 1945–46, and it was not until 1976–77 that it was beaten for the first wicket. It remains the record partnership for any wicket in England. Sutcliffe's share of the stand was 313, his career-highest score. Yorkshire batted first and, at the end of the first day, the score stood at 423–0, with Holmes on 180 and Sutcliffe on 231, already beating their previous best stand of 347 against Hampshire in 1920. Bill Bowes and Hedley Verity then proceeded to bowl Essex out twice, and Yorkshire won by an innings and 313 runs.

Sutcliffe scored 3,336 runs in 1932, the highest season total of his career and it included his highest individual score of 313, made in the world record stand at Leyton. He averaged 74.13 with 14 centuries and 9 half-centuries. He became the third batsman after K S Ranjitsinhji and C B Fry to score 1,000 runs in a month twice in the same season, making 1,193 in June and 1,006 in August. His total of 3,336 is the sixth-highest season aggregate, behind only Denis Compton (3,816 in 1947), Bill Edrich (3,539 in 1947), Tom Hayward (3,518 in 1906), Len Hutton (3,429 in 1949) and Frank Woolley (3,352 in 1928). His fourteen centuries in the season have been bettered only by Compton (18 in 1947), Jack Hobbs (16 in 1925) and Wally Hammond (15 in 1938).

== 1932–33: the "bodyline" tour ==
In the winter of 1932–33, Sutcliffe was a key member of the England team that toured Australia and New Zealand under the captaincy of Douglas Jardine, taking part in all five Tests of the infamous "bodyline" series. Wisden in its tour summary stated unequivocally that "Jardine, while nothing like the batsman in Australia of four years earlier, captained the side superbly" but he "had one great difficulty which he never successfully overcame". The difficulty was to find a suitable partner for Sutcliffe as opening batsman and Wisden continues by remarking on several experiments tried by Jardine throughout the tour but ends by saying that "no real successor to Hobbs was discovered".

Sutcliffe, who was by now England's senior professional, was part of the England selection committee on the tour along with Jardine, Pelham Warner (team manager), Bob Wyatt (vice-captain) and Wally Hammond. Sutcliffe enjoyed only mixed success with the bat but he did make his career highest Test score of 194 in the First Test at Sydney, which England won by 10 wickets. Overall, he scored 1,318 first-class runs on the Australian leg of the tour at 73.22 with 5 centuries, the highest score being his 194 at Sydney. He was the only English batsman to reach 1,000 runs on this tour. Surprisingly, he had no success in New Zealand where, in three appearances, he made just 27 runs.

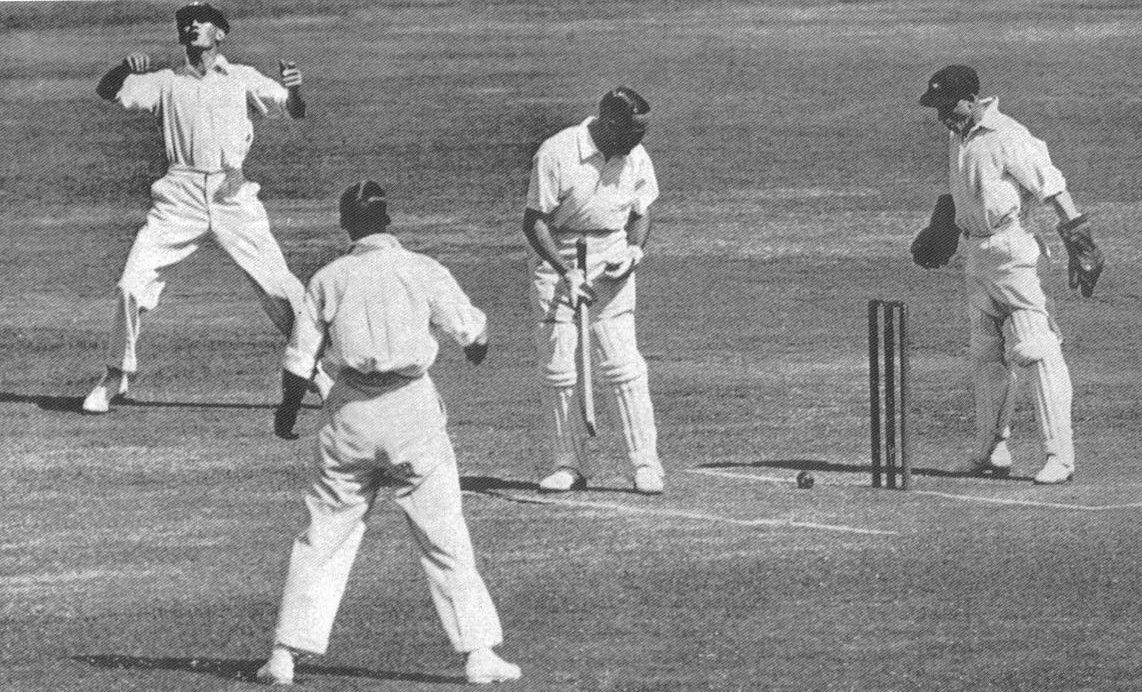
A ball from Bill O'Reilly hits the stumps but the bails are not disturbed and Herbert Sutcliffe is not out. First Test at Sydney, 1932–33.

Australia won the toss at Sydney and decided to bat. Without Bradman, who was ill, they struggled against the pace of Harold Larwood and Bill Voce but, thanks to a brilliant innings of 187 not out by Stan McCabe, they made a creditable 360. England's batsmen had no such troubles and steadily built a total of 524 to claim a first innings lead of 164. Sutcliffe opened with Wyatt and they began with a stand of 112. Wyatt was dismissed for 38 and Sutcliffe then put on 188 for the second wicket with Hammond, who was out at 300–2 for 112. Next man in was Iftikhar Ali Khan Pataudi and he joined Sutcliffe in a third wicket century partnership of 123 before Sutcliffe was finally out for 194 after batting for over 7 hours across the second and third days of the match. The last seven wickets fell for the addition of only 101 more runs. With Larwood taking his second five-wicket haul, Australia could only make 164 to tie the scores and at least make England bat again. Australia was 164–9 at close of play on the fourth day so all that was required on the last day was for Voce to dismiss Bill O'Reilly off the third ball of the morning, without adding to the total, and then Sutcliffe himself to score the solitary run needed to complete an emphatic 10 wicket victory. Wisden recorded that "there were less than a hundred people present to see the finish".

When he had scored 43, he played a ball bowled by O'Reilly onto his stumps but the impact did not shift the bails and so he was not out. Wisden said that "Sutcliffe gave a typical exhibition, being wonderfully sure in defence and certain in his off-driving". There was some criticism of Sutcliffe for scoring slowly at one point in the second half of his innings; but Jardine has confirmed that Sutcliffe was playing under his instructions which "right nobly did Sutcliffe carry them out to the letter".

Australia, with Bradman back in their team, won the Second Test at Melbourne by 111 runs. Having been dismissed for 228 in the first innings, they fought back to reduce England to just 169, in which Sutcliffe made the top score of 52. In the second innings, Bradman effectively won the match for Australia by scoring a resilient 103 not out even though his team was dismissed for just 191. Sutcliffe was again England's highest scorer, making 33 of a poor 139 as O'Reilly and Bert Ironmonger took the wickets.

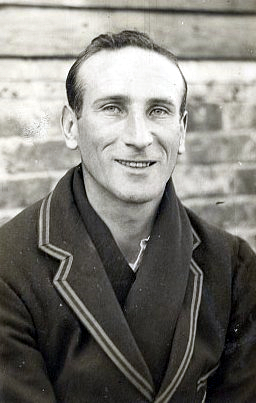
Douglas Jardine. Sutcliffe "backed him to the hilt" on the bodyline tour.

Sutcliffe failed twice in the Third Test at Adelaide, the most controversial match of the tour as it was the one in which the bodyline furore reached its climax. England won by 338 runs but the match was overshadowed by the injuries sustained by Woodfull and Australian wicket-keeper Bert Oldfield and the subsequent heated telegrams and diplomatic row.

England won the Fourth Test at Brisbane by 6 wickets. This time, Sutcliffe opened with Jardine and they put on 114 in the first innings. Sutcliffe scored 86, another top score. England held a narrow lead on first innings and then dismissed Australia for 175. Sutcliffe was out for 2 in the second innings but Leyland held the innings steady and ensured that England won both the match and the series. The Fifth Test at Sydney was therefore academic; but England nevertheless won by 8 wickets, Sutcliffe scoring 56 in his only innings.

According to Bob Wyatt, Sutcliffe "backed Jardine to the hilt" on the subject of bowling "bodyline" aka "fast leg theory". Wyatt said that: "Herbert never hesitated in his views about our bowling strategy. He did not see anything wrong about pursuing the tactics". Les Ames agreed with Wyatt's view and said that, though the majority of the England players were morally opposed to Jardine's tactics, Sutcliffe took the pragmatic view that "the ball is there, it's short, so hook it". Sutcliffe himself was an outstanding player of the hook shot, but Ames was unsure about how he would have coped with Larwood's accuracy if he had been playing against him. According to Bill O'Reilly, Sutcliffe was the strongest advocate of bodyline and he sometimes acted like an "unofficial captain", even initiating the tactics on his own responsibility. However, a close friend of Sutcliffe insisted that Sutcliffe "was always behind authority" and was absolutely loyal to his captain, but his private views about bodyline were another matter.

== 1933 to 1939 ==
In 1933, Sutcliffe could not repeat his outstanding form of the 1932 season but he still scored a considerable 2,211 runs at 47.04, although it was his lowest tally in a dry summer since 1921. He completed seven centuries, with a highest score of 205 against Warwickshire at Edgbaston. Sutcliffe scored 304 runs at 50.66 in four Tests against Australia in 1934. His first-class aggregate for the 1934 season was 2,023 runs at 49.34 with four centuries and a highest score of 203 against Surrey at the Oval. In 1935, Sutcliffe's Test career ended when he missed the Third Test against South Africa due to a leg injury and then never recovered his place when he was fit again. Wisden's view was that England wished to try out younger players, but it pointed out that Sutcliffe "remains a prolific runscorer".

Sutcliffe's record in Test cricket is outstanding. As shown by the adjacent graph, he is the only English batsman who has averaged more than 60 runs per innings in a completed career and his statistical record compares favourably with anyone except Don Bradman. Uniquely, Sutcliffe's batting average never dropped below 60 throughout his entire Test career and Javed Miandad is the only other player whose average never dropped below 50 in a career of at least 20 innings.

The demands of Test cricket behind him, Sutcliffe played in 29 of Yorkshire's 30 County Championship matches in 1936 but his average fell to 33.30, his worst seasonal performance since the early 1920s. His form rallied somewhat in the last three seasons of his career and he formed another outstanding opening partnership with Len Hutton who matured into a Test-class batsman in 1937. Sutcliffe and Hutton put on 315 for the first wicket against Leicestershire at Hull in 1937, Sutcliffe scoring 189 and Hutton 153. Sutcliffe faced Australian opposition for the final time in 1938 when he appeared in two matches against the tourists, one in July for Yorkshire at Bramall Lane and the other in September at North Marine Road in a Scarborough Festival match when he played for H D G Leveson Gower's XI.

Yorkshire completed another hat-trick of County Championships in 1939 and, although he was now 44 and certainly a "veteran", Sutcliffe enjoyed a remarkable sequence of four consecutive centuries in May and June which showed any doubters that he was still one of the best opening batsmen around. Sutcliffe was to play one more first-class match in 1945, but his career effectively ended in August 1939 when he played for Yorkshire against Hampshire at Dean Park Cricket Ground, Bournemouth, on Saturday, 26 August and Monday, 28 August. Yorkshire won by an innings and 11 runs in just two days. Sutcliffe and Hutton put on 56 before Hutton was out for 37 and Sutcliffe went on to score 51 before he was out at 117–2, leg before wicket to George Heath, who thus took his wicket for the second time in 1939.

== Into retirement ==
As a reservist in the British Army, Sutcliffe was the first Yorkshire player to be called up, in August 1939, as the Second World War became imminent. He missed Yorkshire's final match of the season against Sussex at Hove, which ended on 1 September, the day the Wehrmacht invaded Poland. He rejoined the Royal Army Ordnance Corps and attained the rank of major. He did not leave Great Britain during his army service which ended in November 1942. Now aged 48, he was discharged from the army on medical grounds having undergone two operations that year for sinus trouble and a shoulder injury. For the remainder of the war, he divided his time between his sportswear business and charity fundraising.

Like most top-class players, Sutcliffe occasionally played in charity matches during the war, including three to raise money for the Red Cross in 1940. In one of these, he played for a Yorkshire XI against a Bradford League XI at Park Avenue and scored 127, which was his last-ever century. The League team included Eddie Paynter, Manny Martindale and Learie Constantine, who scored a brilliant century in what Sutcliffe described as "a gem of an innings".

Although Alan Gibson described Sutcliffe as "a good public speaker", Sutcliffe himself seems to have been modest about this ability. During the war, he was asked to share a charity event platform with Sir Compton Mackenzie in Bradford. Mackenzie gave a brilliant speech that was well received and Sutcliffe said to him: "Oh, my, how I wish I could speak like you". Mackenzie, who was a keen cricket fan, replied: "You don't wish nearly as much that you could speak like me as I wish I could bat like you".

Sutcliffe had already stated his intention to retire from first-class cricket but nevertheless he returned in August 1945 at the age of 50 for one final match after the war in Europe ended. He captained the Yorkshire team in a match against a Royal Air Force team at North Marine Road in the renewed Scarborough Festival. The match was drawn after being affected by the weather. Sutcliffe batted once, going in at number 5, and scored just 8 runs before being dismissed leg before wicket (lbw) by Bill Edrich.

In 1949, Sutcliffe was accorded honorary membership of MCC and joined what was then a select company of English professionals including George Hirst, Wilfred Rhodes and Jack Hobbs.

Sutcliffe continued to be involved in cricket and his Wisden obituary says: "His repayment to the game which had given him so much was service on the Yorkshire committee, as an England selector, and as sponsor for many good causes in cricket". In a tribute that was published with the obituary, Brian Sellers said: "We served together on the county committee for over 21 years". Sutcliffe was a Test selector for three years from 1959 through 1961, during which England played home series against India, South Africa and Australia.

In February 1963, Yorkshire appointed Sutcliffe a life member of the club and then, in July 1965, his old captain Sir William Worsley, now president of the club, formally opened the Sutcliffe Gates in the St Michael's Lane approach to the Headingley ground. Similar in design to the Hobbs Gates at the Oval, they carry the inscription:

In honour of a great Yorkshire and England cricketer

Sutcliffe retained his interest in cricket for the rest of his life. One of his final public appearances was in 1977 when, in his wheelchair and only a few months before he died, he was photographed at Headingley alongside Len Hutton and Geoff Boycott just after Boycott had emulated Sutcliffe and Hutton by becoming the third Yorkshire batsman to score 100 centuries in his first-class career.

Wisden summarised his career thus:

Herbert Sutcliffe was one of the great cricketers and he brought to cricket as to all his undertakings an assurance and capacity for concentration that positively commanded success. His technical talent matched his character and his achievements were therefore on the highest plane.

On 30 September 2009, Herbert Sutcliffe was inducted into the ICC Cricket Hall of Fame.

== Style and technique ==
=== Sutcliffe's approach to cricket ===
Sutcliffe's approach was essentially to do everything possible to help his team to win the match. His philosophy was that the game was there to be won and not merely to be played. He was determined to keep his wicket intact and, according to Fred Trueman, "he was a terrible man to get out" and "was at his best in a crisis". Sutcliffe's professionalism was reflected in his preparation and off-field demeanour. He took great pride in his appearance, and Trueman says he was "always spick and span". Neville Cardus described him thus: "...shiny of hair, black as the raven's, with flannels of fluttering silk, and the confident air of super-Pudsey breeding. A deviation from type, a 'sport' in the evolutionary process!"

Sutcliffe was "unfailingly courteous as a man" and, along with his England colleague Hobbs, "committed to advancing the cause of the professional cricketer". According to Stuart Surridge, "our profession as a respected one started with Jack and Herbert (who) gave us a new status".

One of the main reasons why Yorkshire were prepared to offer the captaincy to Sutcliffe in 1927 was because he was not perceived to be the typical professional. Sutcliffe set high standards for himself and was determined to get on in life, as well as cricket, and make a lot of money. Wally Hammond, who eventually did turn amateur and captained England, was another example. Sutcliffe took pains to modify his accent and, as Neville Cardus commented, Sutcliffe eventually spoke "not with the accents of Yorkshire but of Teddington". Cardus remarked on the Savile Row suits worn by Sutcliffe and Hammond: "The county cricketer has in certain instances become a man of bourgeois profession". But Bill Bowes, an ex-grammar school boy who had benefited from educational reforms that were unavailable to Sutcliffe and the older professionals, regarded Sutcliffe as a hero. Writing about Sutcliffe, Bowes pointed out that Sutcliffe was "no ordinary man" and stressed that "professionalism was very important to him".

Cardus wrote:

[Of his batting] Sutcliffe had style... But it was his eternal vigilance, his keen eye and a mind that could move and anticipate, which were his assets, plus his Yorkshire realism and his Yorkshire tenacity of character. Immaculate in flannels, his hair burnished by the sun, the cynosure of all the women's and girls' eyes, a cricketer of manners, symbol of the new urban social consciousness, none the less he could be fitted into the Yorkshire scheme and body and atmosphere, after all.

In his Wisden obituary, the editor wrote that "...neither Pudsey nor any other nursery could have claimed Herbert Sutcliffe as a typical product. He was a Yorkshireman in his loyalty and training, but he was cosmopolitan in approach and outlook. His manner fitted Lord's as expressively as it fitted Leeds".

Trevor Bailey, writing in the 1981 Wisden about cricketers' hairstyles, said that Sutcliffe's was "black patent-leather glinting in the sun, complete with the straightest of partings".

For his part, Sutcliffe explained to Bowes that "Lord Hawke had lifted professional cricket from knee to shoulder level and even Lord Hawke always wanted it back again". But Hawke never could get it back, for professionalism had evolved as society had changed; and the likes of Sutcliffe and Hammond were establishing a respectability for their job, as noted by Stuart Surridge, that enabled them and some of their successors to join the establishment.

=== Batting ===
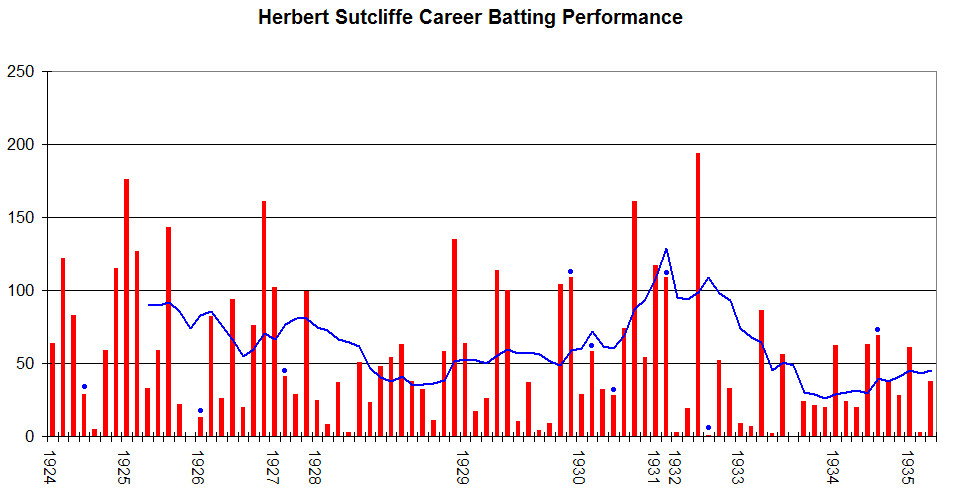
Herbert Sutcliffe's Test career performance graph. The red bars indicate Sutcliffe's Test match innings, while the blue line shows the average of his ten most recent innings at that point. The blue dots indicate innings in which he finished not-out.

Sutcliffe's greatest qualities as an opening batsman were perhaps his even temperament and his penchant for big occasions. It is significant that his Test batting average was substantially better than his overall first-class one. He is especially remembered for his partnerships with Hobbs for England and with Holmes for Yorkshire. One of the main factors in these partnerships was mutual understanding, especially when it came to their judgment of singles, and Sutcliffe was involved in relatively few run outs when batting with either Hobbs or Holmes.

John Arlott wrote that Sutcliffe was a batsman of "immense application and thought". Arlott listed his main qualities as sound defence, powerful offside driving and "arguably the best hooker of his age". But above all, says Arlott, Sutcliffe was "cool, beyond disturbance, the master of survival and the ultimate pragmatist of cricket". Douglas Jardine touched on this point when, describing Sutcliffe's tiredness at the end of the bodyline series, he added that he "feels inclined to think that Sutcliffe rather enjoys appearing to be in difficulties: he so rarely fails to surmount them".

Sutcliffe was noted for his courage when facing the world's fastest bowlers, such as Harold Larwood who paid this tribute to Sutcliffe after his death:

Herbert Sutcliffe needed some getting out. He was a great battler for England and for Yorkshire. He never gave his wicket away unless he was satisfied he had made enough already. With Percy Holmes he formed just about the finest opening partnership I bowled against. I got him out cheaply a few times, but he scored a few hundreds against my bowling, so I reckon we ended up just about square.

Ian Peebles wrote of him:

Where he was unexcelled was in the courage, determination and concentration he brought to the job in hand. Never flustered, and certainly never intimidated, he was at his best on the big or testing occasion.

Sutcliffe told Fred Trueman that, although some batsmen can play fast bowling and some cannot, "if everybody told the truth, no one really likes it". Trueman speaks of Sutcliffe's unselfish attitude when batting, for "he didn't hog the limelight". Rather, he was a "severely practical performer [who] had to cut out the frills as an opening batsman". Sutcliffe's job was to "lay the foundations" of the innings; his main qualifications were having "the ideal temperament" and being "a magnificent judge of line and length".

Sutcliffe lacked the "polished elegance of Hobbs", for he was "essentially a practical batsman with a superb judgment of length, pace and direction". He stood with the face of the bat very open (i.e., to the bowler) so that he could present its full width to the ball every delivery. He was noted as a firm striker off the front foot who also had efficient use of the pull and hook shots. The 1933 edition of Wisden Cricketers' Almanack said of Sutcliffe, in respect of the record partnership with Percy Holmes in 1932, that "like practically all great batsmen, he was generally at much pains to play himself in, and at all times his cricket – even when well set – proved rather more restrained than the situation warranted". The report goes on to say that Sutcliffe "undoubtedly felt a heavy responsibility rested upon him" but concluded by remarking on "how he could hit when he considered he might set about run-getting in light-hearted fashion".

As with all great players, much of Sutcliffe's success was down to hard work. In a contribution to the 1932 edition of Wisden, Lord Hawke said of Sutcliffe that "nobody I know trained, and trains, harder or more conscientiously than Sutcliffe. I ascribe much of his success to that fact".

In an evaluation of Jack Hobbs, Simon Wilde wrote that, amongst English batsmen, until Wally Hammond came to the fore in the late 1920s:

Second in line was undoubtedly the cool, methodical Sutcliffe, Hobbs's trusted opening partner for England, whose average of 66.85 in Ashes matches is the second-highest amongst batsmen with 1,000 runs, 23 points behind Bradman's and 12 ahead of Hobbs's. In his first series against Australia, in 1924–25, Sutcliffe outscored Hobbs, but Hobbs returned home and reaffirmed his position with a record-breaking season in England. Sutcliffe, who began his days as a stylist, later made the most of his abilities with powers of defence and concentration rarely, if ever, seen before (Bradman said Sutcliffe had the best temperament of any cricketer he saw). But Sutcliffe himself conceded that he did not possess the gifts of Hobbs, Hammond or Hutton.

The late R. C. Robertson-Glasgow had written of Sutcliffe a tribute that Wisden appended to Sutcliffe's obituary:

[He] was the serenest batsman I have known. Whatever may have passed under that calm brow – anger, joy, disagreement, surprise, relief, triumph – no outward sign was betrayed on the field of play. When I first saw him, in 1919, he was a debonair and powerful stylist. As you bowled opening overs to the later Sutcliffe you noticed the entire development of every defensive art; the depressingly straight bat, the astute use of pads (as with Hobbs), the sharp detection of which out-swinger could be left; above all, the consistently safe playing down of a rising or turning ball on leg stump, or thighs.

A. A. Thomson wrote of him:

The fact is that for the whole inter-war period he was England's and Yorkshire's anchor-man, a personality as dependable as fallible human nature will allow, This does not mean that he was slow or stodgy... He lacked the polished artistry of Hobbs or the sheer princely quality of Hammond or the delightful impertinence of Holmes, but he lacked nothing else... His spirit warmed to the fight like that of an ancient warrior. His manner was suave; his hair immaculate; his voice quiet; but he revealed his truest self, after his 161 in the 1926 Oval Test, surely the most truly Sutcliffian innings of his life, when he said: 'Yes, Mr. Warner, I love a dogfight...'

=== Bowling and fielding ===
Although Sutcliffe as a boy was thought to have potential as a bowler, he specialised in batting to the extent that he only bowled 993 deliveries, with 31 maiden overs, in his entire first-class career. He bowled a straightforward right-arm medium pace with little success, his best figures being 3–15 while his career average was a very high 40.21.

As a fielder, Sutcliffe generally played in the outfield, where he was a quick retriever of the ball and had a very good throwing arm. As a young man he could throw a cricket ball over 100 yards. He was usually a safe catcher and, in his career, took 23 catches in 54 Tests and 474 in 754 first-class matches.

== Famous partnerships ==
=== Holmes and Sutcliffe ===
The 1919 season saw the beginning of a famous Yorkshire opening partnership that endured for 15 seasons until Percy Holmes retired. Holmes and Sutcliffe were eulogised as Yorkshire's "heavenly twins". A flavour of the Holmes-Sutcliffe partnership was captured by The Cricketer in a profile written in 1921:

There is usually a hum of expectancy when Holmes and Sutcliffe appear, their faces wreathed in smiles, and chatting happily together. They seem to be sharing some all-absorbing joke. Holmes, proudly wearing his Yorkshire cap, walks with quick, short steps, shoulders erect and head in the air, doing his best to look as tall as (John) Tunnicliffe. Sutcliffe has dark, glossy hair and usually disdains the valued White Rose cap when batting. He strolls casually along by the side of Percy, keeping his weather eye open for the wicket-keeper's end and the honour of taking the first ball.

Holmes and Sutcliffe shared 74 century stands in all first-class matches including 69 for Yorkshire. 19 of these exceeded 200 and 4 were over 300, including their world record stand of 555 at Leyton in 1932. Yorkshire won the title 8 times in the seasons that Holmes and Sutcliffe opened the innings together.

=== Hobbs and Sutcliffe ===
In September 1922, Sutcliffe played in a Scarborough Festival match for C I Thornton's XI against MCC and, for the first time, was paired with Jack Hobbs in an opening partnership. They put on 120 in their only innings until Hobbs was out for 45; Sutcliffe went on to make 111.

Following his successful season with Yorkshire in 1922, Sutcliffe was in contention for a place on the England tour of South Africa in the winter of 1922–23, especially as Jack Hobbs declined to tour. The selectors evidently felt that Sutcliffe was not yet ready but they were, "as events would prove, wise to delay his promotion" as it ensured that Sutcliffe would have Hobbs as his "influential guide on the international stage". Percy Holmes was also overlooked and England's openers in the 1922–23 series were Andy Sandham, Frank Mann and Jack Russell.

Jack Hobbs (left) and Herbert Sutcliffe opening an innings for England.

The partnership of Jack Hobbs and Herbert Sutcliffe, opening the innings together for England from 1924 to 1930, is the most famous in cricket history. With partnerships of 136 and 268 in their first two Test matches together, they were a success from the start and The Cricketer said:

Hobbs is undoubtedly the sauciest run-stealer in the world today. In Sutcliffe, he has found the ideal partner in the felony, for the Yorkshireman unhesitatingly responds to his calls, showing absolute confidence in Hobbs' judgement.

England wicket-keeper Les Ames, himself a top-class batsman, commented on their running together between the wickets by emphasising the placement of the stroke, which was so correct that they could "just play and run". Ames said they were not fast runners and that "Herbert only strolled".

Sutcliffe readily acknowledged his debt to his "influential guide" by naming his eldest son after him and writing, in a booklet published in 1927, that he doubted if Hobbs had an equal and that, as a batsman, "he stands alone (and is) the best I have ever seen". Sutcliffe expressed the view that if W G Grace was as good as Jack Hobbs, "then he must have been wonderful". He said that Hobbs' earliest advice to him had been simply: "Play your own game". Sutcliffe commented: "Four words – they counted for so much. They told me all I wanted to know".

Ian Peebles wrote that Sutcliffe's association with Hobbs "is judged, by results and all-round efficiency in all conditions", the greatest of all first-wicket partnerships and "will probably never be excelled". Peebles said that there lay between the two an "extraordinary understanding, manifested in their perfect and unhesitating judgment of the short single".

The last Test match in which Hobbs and Sutcliffe played together was the final one at The Oval, Hobbs' home ground, in the 1930 series against Australia. But the partnership was revived at the 1931 Scarborough Festival when they produced two double-century stands, first for the Players against the Gentlemen and then for H D G Leveson-Gower's XI against the New Zealand tourists. Their last partnership was for the Players at Lord's in 1932, an innings in which Hobbs carried his bat for 161 not out. Hobbs' biographer Ronald Mason summarised the association of Hobbs and Sutcliffe thus:

Behind them were nine years of wonderful attainment, 26 opening partnerships of 100 or more; a legendary technique and repute unequalled by any other pair; the lean, active quizzical Hobbs and the neat, wiry imperturbable Sutcliffe, who set a standard that can serve as a guide, but defied all attempts at emulation.

Hobbs and Sutcliffe made 15 century opening partnerships for England in Test matches, including 11 against Australia, and 11 in other first-class matches.

=== Sutcliffe and Hutton ===
Sutcliffe and Len Hutton opened the Yorkshire innings in one championship match in 1934 and then, with Sutcliffe's Test career ending the following year, became the regular Yorkshire pairing until 1939 when the outbreak of war effectively ended Sutcliffe's career.

Especially given that he was from Pudsey, Hutton was often portrayed as Sutcliffe's protégé; but Hutton maintained that it was the coaching of George Hirst that did most to develop his career. He said of Sutcliffe: "You do learn a lot from watching a player of Herbert's class. It was an enriching and invaluable experience to bat with him". Sutcliffe's view of Hutton was that he was "a marvel – the discovery of a generation". Hutton said that his shyness and the fact that he was twenty years younger than Sutcliffe made it difficult for him to approach his partner when he needed help, which he more readily got from Bill Bowes and Hedley Verity. About Sutcliffe, he said: "I did not find it easy to talk to him".

The master–apprentice relationship changed after Hutton scored a world record 364 for England against Australia at The Oval in 1938. Future Yorkshire captain Ronnie Burnet reckoned that Sutcliffe had been the dominant partner until then and their scores would be something like 60 to 40 in Sutcliffe's favour. After Hutton made his record, his confidence increased and Burnet said the ratio was reversed "to 70:30 in Len's favour". Burnet said that Hutton was "tearing attacks apart in 1939 and Herbert was by then playing second fiddle".

Comparisons of the two Pudsey masters have been inevitable; but there were essential differences in style. Bill Bowes said that Sutcliffe readily acknowledged the superior ability of Jack Hobbs, Wally Hammond and Len Hutton; but Sutcliffe had the concentration and willpower to make the best of his abilities in any given situation. Hutton pinpointed the key difference by explaining that, when Sutcliffe was taking guard, "his weight was on the (front) left foot, enabling him to play the hook shot so well" whereas Hutton put his weight onto his (back) right foot. Hence Sutcliffe more easily moved back while Hutton developed a forward style. Another view, expressed by Sutcliffe's son Billy, who also played with Hutton for Yorkshire, was that Sutcliffe was "probably better in a crisis", as his numerous successes on bad or "sticky" wickets would suggest.

Sutcliffe and Hutton made 16 century opening partnerships together, 15 of them for Yorkshire. Their highest was 315, which they achieved twice.

== Noted opponents ==
As a specialist opening batsman, Sutcliffe's rivals on the field were the opposing bowlers and especially fast bowlers, though he encountered many outstanding spin bowlers too on turning or sticky wickets.

By the time Sutcliffe began his Test career, the formidable fast bowling partnership of Jack Gregory and Ted McDonald had ended, though Sutcliffe faced Gregory in Test matches and was opposed to McDonald in "Roses matches" between Yorkshire and Lancashire. Gregory by 1924–25 was no longer able to "frighten batsmen with sheer speed" but he still commanded respect and Jack Hobbs specifically told Sutcliffe to exercise caution against Gregory at the start of an innings. Sutcliffe regarded McDonald as "one of the best bowlers I ever met". He commented on McDonald's trick of "resting" by making himself seem tired and then "hurling himself into (a very fast delivery) like a demon". As Sutcliffe said, he never knew which ball would be the fast one and McDonald was a dangerous opponent.

But Sutcliffe was quoted as saying that he had "never played finer fast bowling" than that of the West Indians Learie Constantine, George Francis, Herman Griffith and Manny Martindale. Among the best English bowlers he faced in county cricket were some of his colleagues in England teams, such as Harold Larwood, Maurice Tate and Tich Freeman.

One of the toughest competitors he faced was the Australian leg spinner Clarrie Grimmett, "a tiny gnome of a man", who bowled with a roundarm action and made his Test debut at the age of 34, taking 11 wickets in his first match. Grimmett bowled "like a miser" and "begrudged every run", whereas his leg spin partner Arthur Mailey was the type of bowler who would "buy" his wickets by conceding runs and then, having boosted the batsman's confidence, snaring him with a "wrong 'un" (i.e., a googly). On Sutcliffe's first tour of Australia, he commented that he "was troubled most of the time by Arthur Mailey" but eventually he learned how to "differentiate between Mailey's leg breaks and his wrong 'uns".

== Records ==
- Fastest in world to reach 1,000 Test runs (later equalled by Everton Weekes) by achieving the feat in the 12th innings of his career.

== Personal and business life ==
Sutcliffe married Emily ("Emmie") Pease at Pudsey Parish Church on 21 September 1921. She had been a personal secretary to Richard Ingham, a mill owner who had introduced Sutcliffe to Pudsey St Lawrence. They had three children: two sons named Billy and John, and a daughter named Barbara. Billy Sutcliffe, whose middle name was Hobbs, played for Yorkshire between 1948 and 1957, captaining the team in the last two seasons of his career.

At the end of the 1924–25 tour of Australia, Sutcliffe and his Yorkshire colleague George Macaulay went into business together, forming a sports outfitting company with shops in Leeds and Wakefield. However, Macaulay withdrew from the business after a year and it became a Sutcliffe family concern until it folded in the 1990s. The business thrived while Sutcliffe was playing cricket and established itself as one of the leading sports goods retailers in the north of England. Sutcliffe ceased to have an active role in 1948 when he handed over the management to his son Billy.

Sutcliffe became the northern area representative, and eventually a director, of a paper manufacturer called Thomas Owen, which was later amalgamated into Wiggins Teape. This firm also employed Douglas Jardine as company secretary, while Maurice Leyland, Bill Edrich and Len Hutton were other area representatives.

Sutcliffe developed severe arthritis in his old age, the disease crippling him to the extent that he needed a wheelchair. He suffered personal tragedy in April 1974 when his wife Emmie, then aged 74, died as result of severe burns following a fire at the family home in Ilkley. He was finally admitted to a Cross Hills nursing home in North Yorkshire where he died in January 1978 at the age of 83.

== Footnotes ==
• a) Note that there are different versions of Sutcliffe's first-class career totals as a result of his participation in the 1930–31 Indian season. See Variations in first-class cricket statistics for more information.

== Bibliography ==
- John Arlott, Arlott on Cricket (ed. David Rayvern Allen), Collins, 1984
- John Arlott, Portrait of the Master, Penguin, 1982
- Barclays World of Cricket, 3rd edition, (ed. E. W. Swanton), Willow Books, 1986. Article on Sutcliffe written by Ian Peebles.
- Derek Birley, A Social History of English Cricket, Aurum, 1999
- Neville Cardus, Close of Play, Sportsmans Book Club edition, 1957, "Sutcliffe and Yorkshire", pp. 1–10
- Bill Frindall, The Wisden Book of Cricket Records, Queen Anne Press, 1986, ISBN 0-356-10736-1
- Alan Gibson, The Cricket Captains of England, Cassell, 1979
- Alan Hill, Herbert Sutcliffe: Cricket Maestro, Simon & Schuster, 1991; Stadia, 2007 (2nd edition)
- Douglas Jardine, In Quest of the Ashes, Methuen, 2005
- Ronald Mason, Jack Hobbs, Sportsman's Book Club, 1961
- Pelham Warner, Lords: 1787–1945, Harrap, 1946
- Pelham Warner, Cricket Between Two Wars, Sporting Handbooks, 1946
- Roy Webber, The County Cricket Championship, Sportsman's Book Club, 1958
- Simon Wilde, Number One: The World's Best Batsmen and Bowlers, Gollancz, 1998, ISBN 978-0-575-06453-9
- Wisden Cricketers' Almanack, various editions from 1920 to 1946
- Graeme Wright, A Wisden Collection, Wisden, 2004
