= John Thewlis =

John Thewlis may refer to:

- John Thewlis (cricketer, born 1828) (1828–1899), English cricketer
- John Thewlis (cricketer, born 1850) (1850–1901), his nephew, English cricketer
