= Forward defence =

Forward defence may refer to:

- Forward defence (cricket), a shot in cricket
- Forward defence (Roman military), a military tactic of the Roman Empire
- Muhamalai Forward Defence Line, a Sri Lankan defence line
- Forward defence, a Cold War NATO doctrine in Europe, see AirLand Battle
