= Henry Lockwood (cricketer) =

English cricketer

Henry Lockwood (20 October 1855 – 18 February 1930) was an English first-class cricketer, who played sixteen matches for Yorkshire County Cricket Club between 1877 and 1882.

Born in Lascelles Hall, Huddersfield, Yorkshire, England, Lockwood was the nephew of John Thewlis senior, who also played for Yorkshire from 1862 to 1875, and the brother of Ephraim Lockwood, who played from 1868 to 1884, and was related to the cricketing Eastwood and Bates families who also lived at Lascelles Hall. By no means as talented as Ephriam, he was a good league professional, being engaged in 1879 at Hollen Hall, Oldham and at Rochdale C.C. from 1884 to 1886. In 1892, he played for Burnley St Andrews C.C, in 1894 and 1895 with Cockermouth C.C. and, in 1897, with the Little Lever Club, Bolton. Like his father and other relations he was a weaver by trade.

A right-handed batsman, he scored 408 runs at an average of 16.32 for Yorkshire, with by far his best score of 90 not out coming against Gloucestershire. He also scored 54 against Kent. He bowled forty eight balls of right arm round arm fast medium, conceding 37 runs, without success.

He died in February 1930 in Lepton, Huddersfield.
