= Forward defence (cricket) =

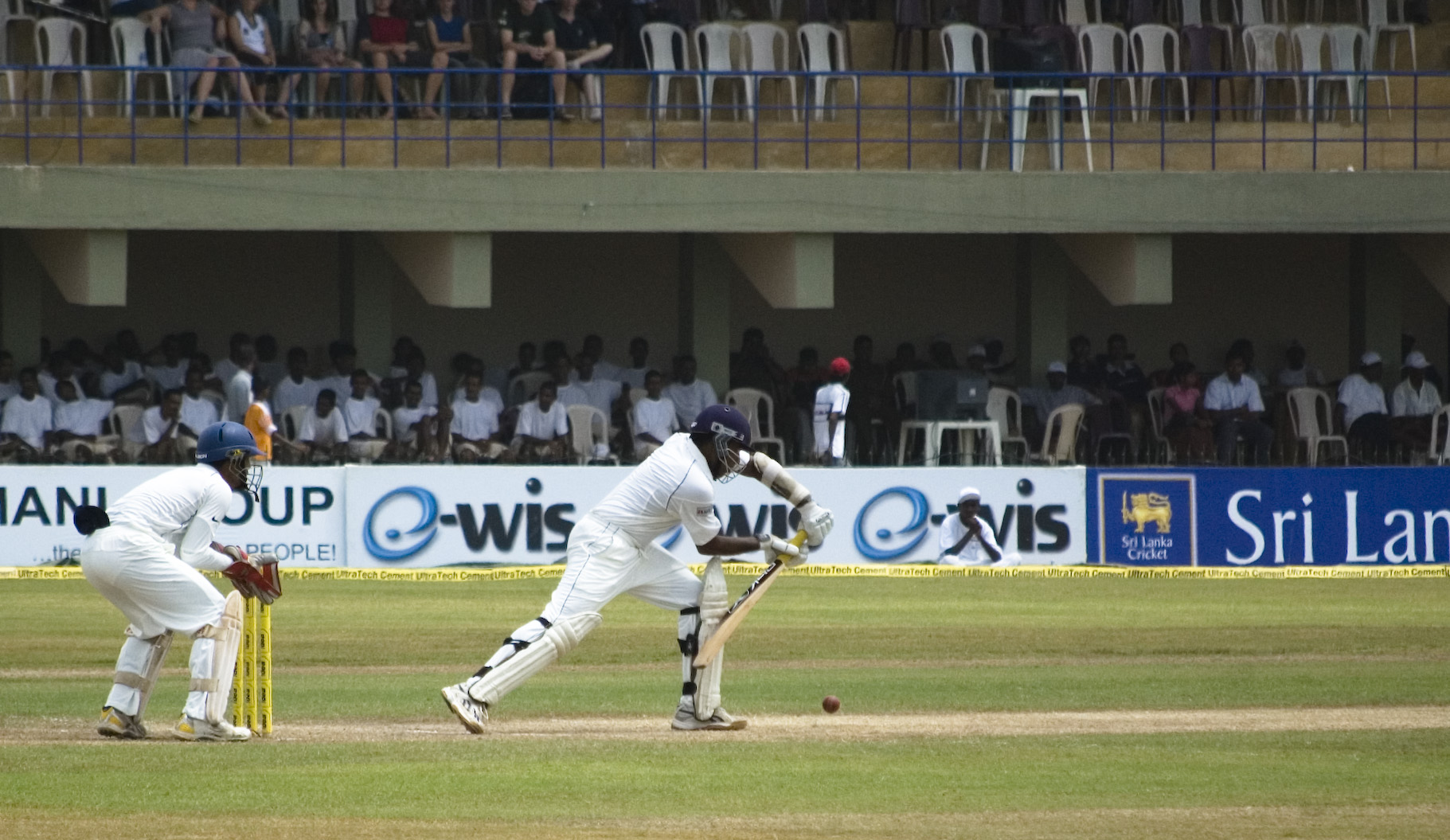
Mahela Jayawardene plays a forward defence

The forward defence is one of the most commonly used shots in cricket.

The prime objective of playing a forward defence shot is to block the ball rather than to score runs. But there can be opportunities to score from this shot, if the shot is particularly well timed, or if the batsmen run a quick single.

Played to a good length ball, the batsman attempts to defend his wicket by smothering the ball before it has an opportunity to spin or move off the seam. With a well-bent front knee, the shot can also help combat variable bounce.
