= Cec Tyson =

English cricketer

Personal information
- Full name: Cecil Thomas Tyson
- Born: 24 January 1889; Brompton-by-Sawdon, Scarborough, Yorkshire, England
- Died: 3 April 1940 (aged 51); Leeds, Yorkshire, England
- Batting: Left-handed
- Bowling: Left-arm medium
- Role: Batsman

Domestic team information
- Years: Team
- 1921: Yorkshire
- 1926: Glamorgan

Career statistics
Competition	First-class
Matches	5
Runs scored	320
Batting average	45.71
100s/50s	1/2
Top score	100*
Balls bowled	90
Wickets	0
Bowling average	–
5 wickets in innings	–
10 wickets in match	–
Best bowling	–
Catches/stumpings	1/–
- Source: CricInfo, 13 September 2009

Cecil Thomas Tyson (24 January 1889 – 3 April 1940) was an English first-class cricketer, who played for Yorkshire County Cricket Club and Glamorgan between 1921 and 1926.

== Career ==
Born in Brompton-by-Sawdon, Scarborough, Yorkshire, England, Tyson enjoyed a successful career as a left-handed batsman in League cricket in Yorkshire, and made his debut for Yorkshire at the age of 32, against Hampshire at County Cricket Ground, Southampton, in May 1921. He scored an unbeaten century and 80 not out against a strong bowling side, and followed this with 29 against the touring Australians, and an appearance in the Bradford hosted Roses Match, but difficulties over employment terms stopped him from playing again, and he returned to league cricket with Castleford C.C.

Tyson was still eager to play in county cricket, so in 1926 he agreed to having a trial with Glamorgan and began a qualification period playing for Gowerton C.C. He continued to score heavily in the Leagues and made his debut for the Welsh county in their match against the Australians at the St. Helen's Rugby and Cricket Ground in Swansea. He also scored a composed 79 in the county's friendly with H. D. G. Leveson-Gower's XI at Cardiff Arms Park, but this proved to be his final game at first-class level. After Glamorgan failed to offer a good enough contract, he again returned to the more lucrative league cricket scene in Northern England.

He played only five games of first-class cricket, scoring 320 runs at 45.71. He bowled 15 overs of left arm medium pace, conceding 32 runs without taking a wicket. He also played for the Yorkshire Second XI (1911) and Yorkshire Council (1920).

Tyson died in Leeds, Yorkshire, in April 1940, aged 51.
