= John Thewlis (cricketer, born 1850) =

English cricketer (1850–1901)

John Thewlis (21 September 1850 – 9 August 1901) was an English first-class cricketer, who played three matches for Yorkshire County Cricket Club in 1876.

Born in Lascelles Hall, Huddersfield, Yorkshire, England, Thewlis was a right-handed batsman, who hit 21 runs at 5.25, with a best of ten against the Marylebone Cricket Club (MCC). His right and round-arm bowling was never employed in the first-class game. He was of considerable cricketing pedigree, his cousin, Ephraim Lockwood, playing 328 first-class games and a Yorkshire stalwart for many years, while his uncle, also named John Thewlis, played over fifty matches for the county.

Thewlis died in Huddersfield in August 1901.
