= Lincoln Allison =

English academic and essayist

Lincoln Allison (born 5 October 1946) is an English academic and essayist.

== Life and career ==
Allison was born in Hartlepool, Durham, and grew up in Colne, Lancashire. He was educated at Royal Grammar School, Lancaster, and at University and Nuffield Colleges, Oxford. He was a research scholar at Stanford University before taking up a position at the University of Warwick, where he taught from 1969 to 2004. Retired from full-time teaching, he is now Emeritus Reader in Politics at the University of Warwick and visiting professor in the politics of sport at the University of Brighton.

Commenting in 2023 on new rules which aim to restrict relationships between university staff and students, Allison said that as a young lecturer he "played sport with students, got drunk with students and made love with students. All of this seemed entirely normal on the campus of a new university in the late 1960s and early 1970s."

He is most noted for his work on the politics of sport, for which he was awarded a D.Litt in 2003, but he has also produced books on a number of other topics and been a prolific writer for magazines and newspapers since the 1970s.

He married Ann McDonnell in 1975; they have three sons.

== Books ==
- Environmental Planning: A Political and Philosophical Analysis 1975
- Condition of England: Essays and Impressions 1981
- Right Principles: A Conservative Philosophy of Politics 1984
- The Politics of Sport (edited) 1986
- A Journey Quite Different: Collected Walks 1987
- The Utilitarian Response: Essays on the Contemporary Viability of Utilitarian Political Philosophy (edited) 1990
- Ecology and Utility: The Philosophical Dilemmas of Planetary Management 1991
- The Changing Politics of Sport (edited) 1993
- Taking Sport Seriously (edited) 1999
- Amateurism in Sport: An Analysis and a Defence 2000
- The Global Politics of Sport: The Role of Global Institutions in Sport 2005
- The Disrespect Agenda: Or How the Wrong Kind of Niceness Is Making Us Weak and Unhappy 2008
- My Father's Bookcase: A Version of the History of Ideas 2011
- Understanding International Sport Organisations: Principles, Power and Possibilities (with Alan Tomlinson) 2017
