= Good length ball =

Type of delivery in cricket

Lengths of balls showing name & bounce height. The good length is the middle path, indicated in red

A good length ball pitches in the bright green area of the pitch

A good length ball is a type of delivery in cricket that pitches at a distance from the batsman that makes it difficult to score runs. Furthermore, such a delivery is difficult for the batsman to judge whether to play on the back-foot or on the front-foot. However, the distance from the batsman which is the ideal good length varies depending on how high and fast the ball bounces on a particular pitch. The pace of the bowler is also a factor, as faster bowlers will aim to pitch the ball further away from the batsman.

== See also ==
- Cricket terminology
