= Major Booth =

English cricketer (1886–1916)

- Booth in 1912

Personal information
- Born: 10 December 1886; Pudsey, Yorkshire, England
- Died: 1 July 1916 (aged 29) near Serre, Somme, France
- Batting: Right-handed
- Bowling: Right-arm medium-fast

International information
- National side: England
- Test debut: 13 December 1913 v South Africa
- Last Test: 3 March 1914 v South Africa

Career statistics
| Competition | Test | First-class |
|---|---|---|
| Matches | 2 | 162 |
| Runs scored | 46 | 4,753 |
| Batting average | 23.00 | 23.29 |
| 100s/50s | 0/0 | 2/21 |
| Top score | 32 | 210 |
| Balls bowled | 312 | 25,189 |
| Wickets | 7 | 603 |
| Bowling average | 18.57 | 19.82 |
| 5 wickets in innings | 0 | 43 |
| 10 wickets in match | 0 | 9 |
| Best bowling | 4/49 | 8/47 |
| Catches/stumpings | 0/– | 120/– |
- Source: CricketArchive, 20 August 2021

Major William Booth (10 December 1886 – 1 July 1916) was a cricketer who played for Yorkshire County Cricket Club between 1908 and 1914, a season in which he was named one of the Wisden Cricketers of the Year.

Note that "Major" was a given name, not a military rank. His international career was restricted to the 1913–14 tour of South Africa, which was the last Test match tour before the First World War. After receiving a commission in the West Yorkshire Regiment, Booth became Second Lieutenant Major Booth, and died just under a year later. Having gone 'over the top' on 1 July 1916, the first day of the Somme offensive near Serre, he was severely wounded. He was taken into a crater where in his dying moments he was held by Abe Waddington, who survived the war and went on to play for Yorkshire and England himself. After his death his sister would light a candle in his room every night in the hope that he would return.

== Cricket career ==
Booth's earliest cricket was played at Fulneck School, and later he was associated with Pudsey St. Lawrence and the Wath Athletic Club, which played in the Mexborough League, and of which he was captain. He appeared regularly for Yorkshire Second Eleven in 1907 and the two following seasons, and in 1908 received his first trial for the county against Somerset at Dewsbury without success. He did not, however, secure a regular place in the team until two years later, but in 1911 he scored 1,125 runs for his county and took seventy-four wickets, with a highest innings of 210 against Worcestershire on the Worcester ground. Booth increased his reputation as a bowler in the following summer, and in 1913 made over a thousand runs and took 158 wickets for Yorkshire, whilst his aggregate of 181 wickets in first-class matches was the highest of any bowler that season. In 1914 he was not so successful in batting – it was said during the 1913 season that he should concentrate on bowling as his build was not ideal for hard work – but he obtained 141 wickets for Yorkshire at a cost of 18 runs apiece. Although a fine punishing batsman, Booth's claim to fame will rest chiefly upon what he accomplished as a bowler. Possessed of a free, natural action, he made the ball come quickly off the pitch. On occasion his off-break was quite formidable, but his strong points were swerve and pace off the ground.

=== Notable feats ===
His best feats with the ball may be summarised thus:

- 8–47, Yorkshire v. Middlesex, at Leeds 1912
- 8–52, Yorkshire v. Leicestershire, at Sheffield 1912
- 8–64, Yorkshire v. Essex, at Leyton 1914
- 8–86, Yorkshire v. Middlesex, at Sheffield: 1913
- 7–21, Yorkshire v. MCC and Ground, at Lord's 1914
- 14–160 (match figures), Yorkshire v. Essex, at Leyton 1914
- 3 wkts in 3 balls, Yorkshire v. Worcestershire, at Bradford 1911
- 3 wkts in 3 balls Yorkshire v. Essex, at Leyton 1912
- 3 wkts in 4 balls Yorkshire v. Warwickshire, at Sheffield 1913
- 3 wkts in 4 balls Yorkshire v. MCC and Ground, at Lord's 1914
- 3 wkts in 4 balls Yorkshire v. Kent, at Sheffield 1914

In two consecutive matches in August 1914, he and Drake bowled unchanged throughout, Gloucestershire being dismissed for 94 and 84 at Bristol and Somerset for 44 and 90 at Weston-super-Mare. In the second innings of the latter match Booth had the very rare experience of bowling throughout without obtaining a wicket, Drake taking all ten for 35 runs.

In 1913 Booth was chosen for the Players at Lord's, and during 1913–14 toured South Africa with MCC's team under Douglas' captaincy. His doings abroad were somewhat disappointing, and so strong was the side that he was left out of three of the Test matches. In the 144 games in which he appeared for Yorkshire Booth scored 4,213 runs with an average of 22.65 and obtained 556 wickets for 18.89 runs each.

Booth was brought up at Town End House near the Britannia Inn at Pudsey. Tall, good-looking, and of engaging address, he was a very popular figure both on and off the cricket field. He was the best man at the wedding of his team-mate Roy Kilner, who named a son after him. There is a memorial tablet in St Lawrence Church in Booth's memory.

== Football career ==
Booth had a short football career with Bradford City and Doncaster Rovers.

== Army service ==
In the First World War Booth joined the British Army as an enlisted man and rose to the rank of sergeant before being commissioned as a second lieutenant on 16 July 1915. Later that year he was posted to Egypt, arriving on 22 December 1915, before returning to the Western Front.

On 1 July 1916 he went "over the top" near La Cigny on the Somme while serving with the 15th (Service) Battalion, the West Yorkshire Regiment (Prince of Wales's Own), also known as "The Leeds Pals". He was followed a short while later by another wave of soldiers among whom was Abe Waddington (later also Yorkshire and England). Waddington was hit and found himself in a shell hole near Serre with Booth, who was also injured, and held him until he died. Booth's body then remained there until the spring, when he was buried at Serre Road No 1 Cemetery.

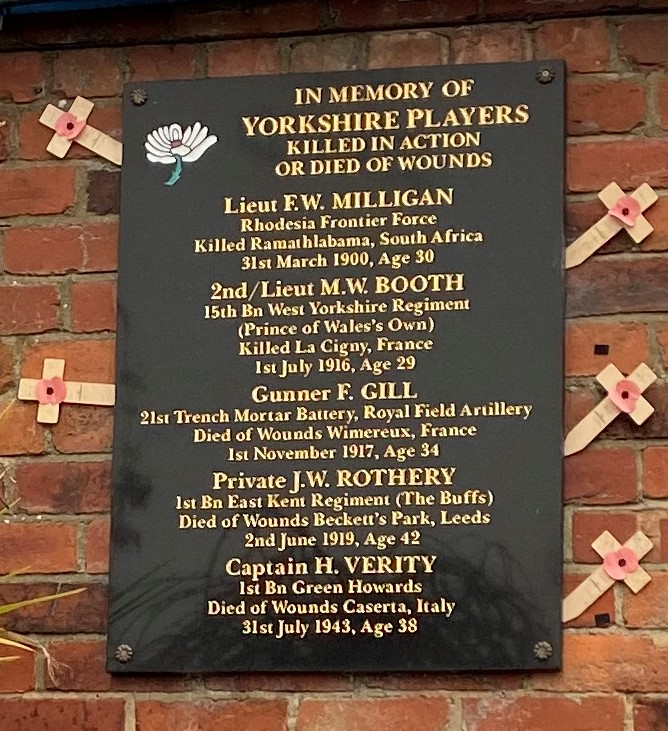
War Memorial at Headingley Stadium
