= Alfred Pullin =

British sports journalist

- Born: Alfred William Pullin; 30 July 1860; Abergwili, Carmarthenshire, Wales
- Died: 23 June 1934 (aged 73); London, England
- Resting place: Wakefield Cemetery, Wakefield, Yorkshire, England
- Other name: Old Ebor
- Occupation: Journalist
- Known for: Sports journalism

Alfred William Pullin, known by the pseudonym Old Ebor (30 July 1860 – 23 June 1934), was a British sports journalist who wrote primarily about rugby union and cricket. He wrote mainly for British newspapers the Yorkshire Post and the Yorkshire Evening Post. Considered by critics to be one of the greatest authorities in the country on his two sports, he wrote a daily column using his pseudonym "Old Ebor" for 40 years. Most often associated with his reporting on Yorkshire County Cricket Club, he has been credited as defining the role of a sports journalist. Two of his most widely known works were on cricket: Talks with Old English Cricketers and History of Yorkshire County Cricket, 1903–23.

== Early life ==
Pullin was born in Abergwili, Carmarthenshire in 1860, to Alfred Trask Pullin, the local schoolmaster, and his wife, Adelaide Evans. His father studied for holy orders; ordained in 1875, he moved to Yorkshire as an assistant curate.

Pullin first worked in journalism in 1880, as Castleford district reporter on the Wakefield Express before moving to write for other local newspapers in Cleckheaton and Bradford. Aged 25, he began to write for the Athletic News when he first used the name "Old Ebor", which meant "Old York". In later years, he preferred to be called "Old Ebor" to his real name, even by his friends. He began to work for the Yorkshire Post as Bradford reporter.

With a family background in rugby union, he played for Cleckheaton as three quarter back in the early 1880s, but was not successful enough to pursue his sporting career. Later, he became a rugby referee.

== Sports journalist ==
=== Career summary ===
During the 1890s, newspapers began to develop sports pages. In 1893, Pullin became cricket and rugby union correspondent for the Yorkshire Post and the Yorkshire Evening Post, writing under his pseudonym "Old Ebor". He followed the Yorkshire and England cricket and rugby teams around the country, and did not miss an England rugby international for 40 years. He also wrote about golf in the Yorkshire Evening Post using the pen name "Dormy Man". With the popularity of football growing in the north of England, he also began to develop his knowledge of that game as well.

Pullin's reputation quickly grew among followers of sport, and by the end of his career he was personally acquainted with many sports journalists. On average, he wrote two columns each day in summer, during the cricket season, and one per day in the winter. As a cricket writer, he became particularly associated with Yorkshire cricket team at a time when the team rose to a position of dominance, and the club remained very important to him. Len Hutton wrote that he and many others in Yorkshire had been brought up on Pullin's writing, while all cricketers were in his debt for the influence of his writing. Hutton himself as a young player appreciated Pullin's encouragement "in and out of print". Pullin retired from full-time writing in 1931 but continued to write in newspapers until his death.

Outside of journalism, Pullin was a director at the relatively short-lived Leeds City Football Club. In Bradford, he was also a freemason and twice became "Worshipful Master of Lodge of Hope".

=== Talks with Old English Cricketers ===
A prolific worker, Pullin also wrote several books on cricket. These included Talks with Old English Cricketers (1900), a biography of Alfred Shaw (1902) and The History of Yorkshire County Cricket 1903–23 (1924). The first of these was his most widely known, and had a considerable impact. The historian Mick Pope writes that it "stirred deep debate among the cricketing public and in the county committee rooms concerning the predicament of several old and seemingly forgotten professional cricketers and with it, tarnished the blossoming reputation of Yorkshire County Cricket Club during a period that they were set to dominate on the field."

The book arose from a series of articles written over the winter of 1898 for the Yorkshire Evening Post, in which he interviewed former players and reflected their experiences after retirement. Encountering the desperate circumstances in which many former players lived, Pullin was moved to campaign on their behalf. Pope suggests that he "did not mince his words ... He held a deep regard for the players, and found it difficult to contemplate the forlorn situation and desperate straits that several of the old Yorkshire cricketers he interviewed were faced with." When investigating the whereabouts of John Thewlis, Pullin was told "Think dead; if not, Manchester". Pullin later wrote about Thewlis: "The moral responsibilities of cricket managers, so far as a player is concerned, should surely not end with the termination of his active career. He ought not to be cast aside like an old shoe."

There had already been public debate on the fate of retired cricketers, and counties had improved pay and conditions for their professional players. For example, several counties, including Yorkshire, had instituted winter pay before Pullin's writings were published. However, former players did not benefit from these reforms.

Pope suggests that Pullin's writing gave the debate "a renewed vigour and sharp focus once again." Although Pullin toned down his comments by the time the articles were published in book form, his attacks on Yorkshire County Cricket Club and general cricket administration aroused public support and led to action. Thewlis, for example, was given work as a groundsman and provided with a pension. In Pullin's entry into the Oxford Dictionary of National Biography, Lincoln Allison notes that the book reflected Pullin's close and sympathetic relationship with the players. Allison describes it as a pioneering work: the unhappy experiences of cricketers after retirement was a phenomenon not widely known at the time. E.W. Swanton, a press box colleague for the last few years of Pullin's career, writes: "It was his revelations about the straits of poverty to which some of these heroes of the past were reduced that first roused the conscience of the public and the county committees, Yorkshire's not least." Derek Hodgson, in the official history of Yorkshire County Cricket Club, writes that Pullin "produced one of the most valuable source books on Victorian cricket".

=== Style and legacy ===
Pullin had a wide knowledge of the game, and remembered past events and players very clearly. His readers appreciated his expertise and frequently wrote to him with queries. A tribute in the Yorkshire Post after his death suggested that Pullin enjoyed this correspondence and felt very close to his readers. His obituary in Wisden Cricketers' Almanack stated that "his writings were at all times discriminative, informative and voluminous". The Manchester Guardian noted that Pullin wrote at a time when many famous cricketers played. It stated that, of these times, he "wrote with a keenness of judgement, a descriptive style, and a fund of anecdote that made the games live again". E.W. Swanton described him as "a thick, bearded fellow" and "a faithful old war-horse". The Yorkshire Post said that Pullin "stood for all the best in sporting critics of the older school ... He was proud, and rightly proud, of the high position which he held in sporting journalism and in the administrative circles of the games on which he wrote". The newspaper judged that he wrote about cricket and rugby players "with a clarity akin to genius ... There can scarcely be a football or cricket ground in England where he was not known and welcomed, and his striking appearance and still more striking personality became traditional in the Press box which he graced. To the players of the games he was generous in praise and kindly in his criticism." Gerald Pawle was told when he became a journalist in 1931 that Pullin originally sent reports to his newspaper by pigeon. Pawle writes: "For the vast Yorkshire cricketing public Old Ebor wrote at inordinate length, unhampered by any consideration of literary style—he was one of the severely factual school—and it amazed me how any pigeon ever struggled into the air when shackled to one of his weighty effusions."

Lord Hawke, writing a foreword to his history of Yorkshire, referred to Pullin as the non-playing member of the county team: "His criticisms on our side form an invaluable guide to the captain, his enthusiasm is contagious, but never allows his judgement to become unbalanced, whilst his eloquent writings on cricket have gone to every part of the world in which there are lovers of the game ... I feel bound to say to the esteemed author of this book—'Well done, thou faithful friend.'" Hawke later said that Pullin's judgement of young cricketers was very good, and that "through his writing he did much to assist the Yorkshire club in encouraging the game and its players".

In the 1920s, Pullin was included in the "Births and deaths" section of Wisden, a rarity for non-players, due to his standing as a reporter. Wisden described him as one of the greatest authorities on cricket. Pullin retired in 1931. Although his reputation was later obscured by writers such as Neville Cardus, Allison believes that "Pullin's greatest achievement was to define the role of the journalist in sport as the critic, popularizer, and interpreter of a particular team to its public." Cardus himself wrote that Pullin "was one of the first writers who gave me help and counsel when I began to write on cricket. He belonged to the dignified old school of cricket journalism and had much in common with Sydney Pardon, though he was always the hard-headed Yorkshireman. He kept his mind on the game, had no use for frills, and despised modern stunting."

== Personal life ==
In 1881, Pullin married Alice Ramsden. The couple had four sons. He did not have many friends, but he was very close to the ones he had. His early association with churches, through his father, gave him an interest in ecclesiastical music; he often played the harmonium to entertain himself and his family. He had strong views on organ music, and once he had formed an opinion he rarely changed his mind.

Pullin died in 1934 while travelling to a Test match at Lord's Cricket Ground. He collapsed on a bus and was pronounced dead on his arrival at hospital. He had been suffering from heart trouble for some time, but wished to continue working and to die "with his boots on". He was buried in Wakefield cemetery. Upon his death, senior figures from Yorkshire County Cricket Club paid tribute to his influence, and his dignity and zealousness were praised by the Leeds branch of the National Union of Journalists. Hutton, who had just broken into the Yorkshire team aged 18, wrote that he "had just got into the habit of looking for that kindly, alert, grey-bearded face of Mr Pullin's either among the players before the day's play or in a Press-tent". Cardus concluded his tribute to Pullin in the Manchester Guardian: "[He] wrote simply, well, and with courtesy and knowledge. A good man and a good friend".

== Bibliography ==
- Hodgson, Derek (1989). The Official History of Yorkshire County Cricket Club. Ramsbury, Marlborough, Wiltshire: The Crowood Press. ISBN 1-85223-274-9.
- Hutton, Len (1948). Cricket is my Life. London: Hutchinson & Co.
- Pope, Mick (2013). Headingley Ghosts: A Collection of Yorkshire Cricket Tragedies. Leeds: Scratching Shed Publishing. ISBN 978-0-9568043-9-6.
