= William Iddison =

English cricketer (1840–1898)

William Holdsworth Iddison (5 February 1840 – 6 March 1898) was an English cricketer active from 1867 to 1868 who played for Lancashire. A brother of Roger Iddison, he was born in Bedale and died in Manchester. He appeared in four first-class matches as a righthanded batsman, scoring 46 runs with a highest score of 19 and held one catch.
