= Frederick Coward =

English cricketer

Frederick Coward (11 February 1842 – 15 December 1905) was an English cricketer active from 1867 to 1868 who played for Lancashire. He was born and died in Preston. He appeared in eight first-class matches as a righthanded batsman, scoring 38 runs with a highest score of 9, and held five catches.
