= Geoffrey Wilson (cricketer) =

English cricketer

Geoffrey Wilson (21 August 1895 – 29 November 1960) was an English amateur first-class cricketer, who played ten matches for Cambridge University in 1919 and 1920, ninety two for Yorkshire County Cricket Club between 1919 and 1924, and thirteen more for the Marylebone Cricket Club (MCC) in 1922/23 on a tour of Australia. He was Yorkshire's captain from 1922 to 1924.

Born in Potternewton, Leeds, Yorkshire, Wilson was educated at Harrow. While there, he scored 173 in 1913 against Eton, the second-highest personal score in the match's history. During World War I he served in the Royal Marines. After the war he went up to Trinity College, Cambridge. As a batsman he scored 1,801 runs at an average of 16.22, with a best of 142 not out for the MCC against Victoria, his only century. He took forty four catches in the field. He took one wicket for 55 runs, bowling his right arm medium pace.

Wilson died in November 1960 in Southsea, Hampshire.
