= John Thewlis (cricketer, born 1828) =

English county cricketer (1828–1899)

John Thewlis (30 June 1828 – 29 December 1899) was an English first-class cricketer, active 1862–75, who played for Sheffield and Yorkshire. Thewlis was noted as a right-hand batsman with a full range of strokes.

== Yorkshire breakthrough ==
Thewlis came late into the game and was the second man to emerge from Lascelles Hall, Huddersfield, and play for his home county. The first, Luke Greenwood, became county captain. George Parr, successor to William Clarke in the management of the All England Eleven, approached him for advice: "Greenwood, we are going to Southampton to play 22 there. Do you know a good batter?" Greenwood replied that, in Thewlis, he did, and so, on nothing more than that brief paean, Parr included him as opening batsman. He was bowled first ball and, as he left the wicket, turned and vowed to the bowler that it would not happen again; nor did it, as Thewlis worked his way to 41 not out in the second innings.

== Career overview ==
Thewlis went on to enjoy a successful first-class career with his county and elsewhere, scoring 1,548 runs at an average of 15.48. His solitary century came against Surrey, whom he met seventeen times. He also appeared for the All England Eleven (1862), North of England (1864–1865), England (1864–1868, albeit not at Test level), United England Eleven (1865), the Players (1868) and the United North of England Eleven (1875). With his playing days all but behind him, he umpired at least sixteen first-class matches from 1869 to 1887.

== Late life hardship ==
Like many professional cricketers of his era, Thewlis fell on hard times after the end of his career. When Alfred Pullin, cricket and rugby correspondent for the Yorkshire Evening Post, sought to track him down for one of eighteen interviews with veteran cricketers in the winter of 1897–98, he was unable to locate his home. On inquiring of Yorkshire County Cricket Club as to his whereabouts, he was informed, "think dead; if not, Manchester".

When Pullin finally did find Thewlis, "he was trudging on foot with a heavy basket of laundry clothes on his shoulder" and, at the end of the four-mile trek "was anxious to walk back again, as soon as possible, to earn a few coppers by getting in a load of coals". Thewlis was seventy years old then. He died the following year, in December 1899, at Lascelles Hall.

== Contemporary opinion ==
Pullin's account of the meeting was published in his Talks With Old Yorkshire Cricketers, which he wrote under the pseudonym "Old Ebor". In a subsequent volume, Talks with Old English Cricketers, Greenwood pronounced Thewlis "one of the best all-round men that ever Lascelles Hall turned out: he had strokes all round the wicket, and he was perfect in them all."

== Kinsmen ==
Thewlis's nephews, John Thewlis junior, Henry Lockwood and Ephraim Lockwood, all played first-class cricket for Yorkshire. The Thewlis family produced many fine players for Lascelles Hall CC. In 1866 the Lascelles Hall team consisted of 11 players all called Thewlis, as were the umpire, scorer and gatekeepers.

== Bibliography ==
- Pullin, Alfred William. Talks with Old English Cricketers. Edinburgh: W. Blackwood, 1900.
- Talks with Old Yorkshire Cricketers. Leeds: Yorkshire Post, 1898.
