= Bradford League =

Football league in West Yorkshire, England

The Bradford League was a football competition based in Bradford, West Yorkshire, England. It was a feeder to the West Riding County Amateur Football League – in 2006 Dudley Hill Athletic made the step up to the higher level. It was sponsored by the local newspaper the Telegraph and Argus and was known as the T&A League. It was previously sponsored by another local company, Grattan plc. The league contained a number of pub teams. The league closed down in 2010.

== Former champions ==
- 1999–2000 – South Bradford
- 2000–01 – South Bradford
- 2001–02 – South Bradford
- 2002–03 – ?
- 2003–04 – Woodlands
- 2004–05 – West Horton
- 2005–06 – West Horton
- 2006–07 – IMS Celtic
- 2007–08 – Bradford All Stars
- 2008–09 – Fairbank United
- 2009–10 – TVR United
