= Bowling action =

Set of movements in cricket

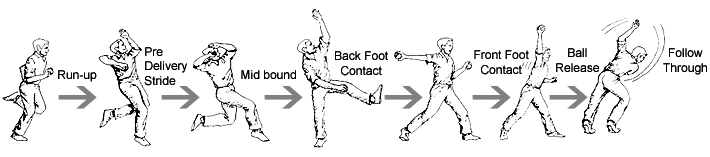
Components of a typical bowling action

In the sport of cricket, the bowling action is the set of movements that result in the bowler releasing the ball in the direction of the batsman.

The bowling action can be broken down into a number of parts:

- Grip
- Approach
- Bound (pre delivery stride)
- Delivery stride
  - Back foot contact
  - Front foot contact
- Point of release
- Follow through

There are certain principles that apply to all parts of the bowling action, such as balance, athleticism and keeping the movement flowing in a narrow corridor directed towards the batsman.

Coaching books describe idealized bowling actions. But some coaches are well aware that many successful bowlers employ their own unique styles and some give birth to new, improved technique (for example, Bart King). The above links all describe the most commonly taught techniques.

== Approach ==
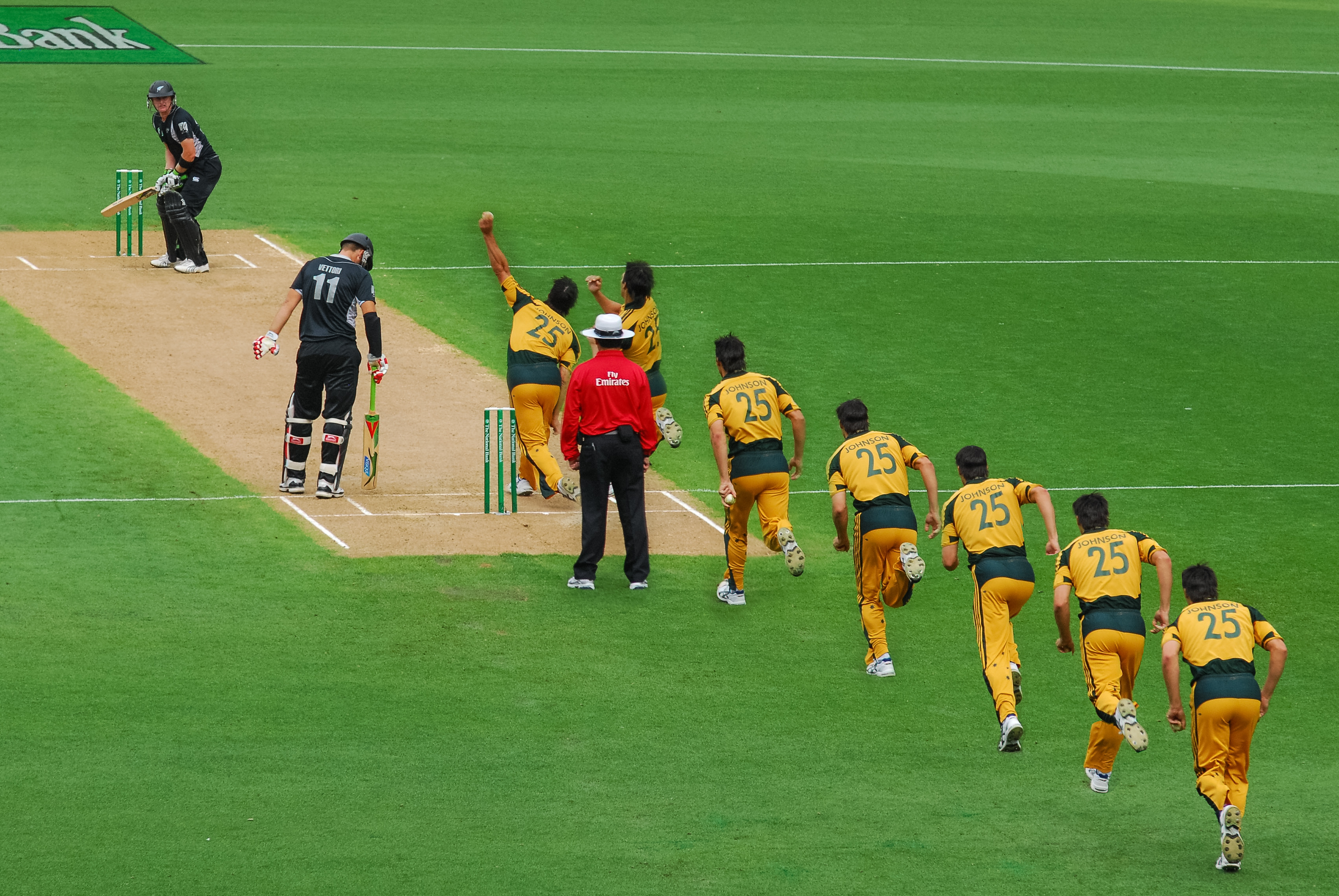
A photo montage of Mitchell Johnson running in to bowl

The approach is the motion of the bowler prior to bowling the ball. It is also known as the run-up.

A spinner's approach differs from that of a medium pace or fast bowler, but certain principles remain the same:

- Balance: lack of balance in the approach translates into lack of balance in the later stages of the action and so absence of accuracy.
- Consistency: a consistent approach allows the later phases of the bowling action to be consistent. Moreover, inconsistency is likely to lead to bowling no-balls.
- Head still and upright.

The strides of the bound, back foot contact, front foot contact and the first stride of the follow through should all be in line to give a balanced action that flows towards the target. Medium pace and quick bowlers usually employ a straight approach that is aligned toward the target. Spin bowlers, on the other hand, tend to have more varied approaches.

As a general rule the different types of bowlers use similar approaches to each other. For example, Spin bowlers tend to have very short run-ups, some even approach the bowling crease at a walking pace. Medium bowlers tend to run up off a short run-up of about 10 paces or so. Fast bowlers tend to have long, rhythmical run-ups to allow them to develop momentum which adds to their ability to bowl the ball at high speeds.

Other recommended elements of the approach are:

- Starting with shorter strides then lengthening to cruise in to the bound.
- Leaning slightly forward, running on the balls of the feet.
- Running with the hands pumping, tucked into the side. This tucked in run up is intended to set the pattern for the whole delivery, keeping everything in a tight corridor flowing towards the target. Some bowlers choose to sacrifice this to cover the ball with the non-bowling hand to disguise the grip.
- Long enough to hit the desired cruise speed and arrive balanced at the bound. Some bowlers, especially chest on bowlers tend to run through the crease. This adds the speed of the approach to the speed at which the ball is released. In contrast, side on bowlers tend to be more similar to javelin throwers. The lower part of their body brakes between front foot contact and point of release causing a whip like effect. Hence side on bowlers tend to have slower approaches.

The ball must be delivered from behind a bowling crease, but preparation to bowl the ball can be done any way the bowler wishes. Every different bowler approaches the wicket in a personal way, and so there can be many and varied "run-ups".

The term "run-up" can also refer to the area where the bowler runs during his run-up.

== Bound ==
The bound is a jump that allows the bowler to transition from the run-up to the back foot contact position. For a chest on bowler not much transition is needed. So, many chest on bowlers have a low, short bound. In contrast, side on bowlers need to rotate their bodies through ninety degrees and so tend to have a longer, higher bound. A high bound can lead to the knee on the back foot collapsing and so lose momentum.

== Delivery stride ==
Delivery stride is the stride during which the delivery swing is made, whether the ball is released or not. It starts when the bowler's back foot lands for that stride and ends when the front foot lands in the same stride.

=== Back foot contact ===
Back foot contact is position of the bowler at the instant when the back foot lands on the ground just prior to delivering the ball. For a right-handed bowler, the back foot is normally the right foot.

An alternative name for back foot contact is coil.

Alignment

To avoid back injury it is important that the hips and shoulders are aligned at back foot contact. This can be done in any of the following positions:

- Side on: the back foot is parallel to the bowling crease causing the hips to be side on. The non-bowling arm is positioned in front of head so causing the shoulders to align with the hips. A classic example of a side on bowler is Dennis Lillee.
- Chest on: the back foot points straight down the track towards the target, aligning the hips parallel to the bowling crease. The non bowling arm is positioned to the side of the head. This aligns the shoulders and chest parallel with the bowling crease and hips. Malcolm Marshall is an example of a chest on bowler.
- Mid-way: the back foot is in between the side on and chest on position. A fine example of a mid-way bowler is Allan Donald.
- If the bowler's back foot is behind parallel to the bowling crease, the bowler loses momentum and speed when delivering the ball. This is because the bowler's back foot bends at the knee and causes momentum to be lost and the bowler then has to go back and lift their whole body back upright.

An action that fails to align hips and shoulders at back foot contact is termed a mixed action.

Other coaching points

- The body should be upright or just slightly leaning back. Leaning back too far causes momentum to be lost as it takes too long to transfer from back foot contact to front foot contact.
- Head still and looking at the target.
- Ball held close to the chin. This tucked in position allows the ball to be brought through in an arc that is aligned with the target. This is obviously important for accuracy, but is also important for power.
- The non-bowling arm should also be inside or close to the line of the trunk. Traditionally the non-bowling arm is held vertically. More recent bio-mechanical theories have suggested that the non-bowling hand touching the bowling shoulder provides a shorter lever, permitting greater pace for quick bowlers. Shoaib Akhtar uses this technique.

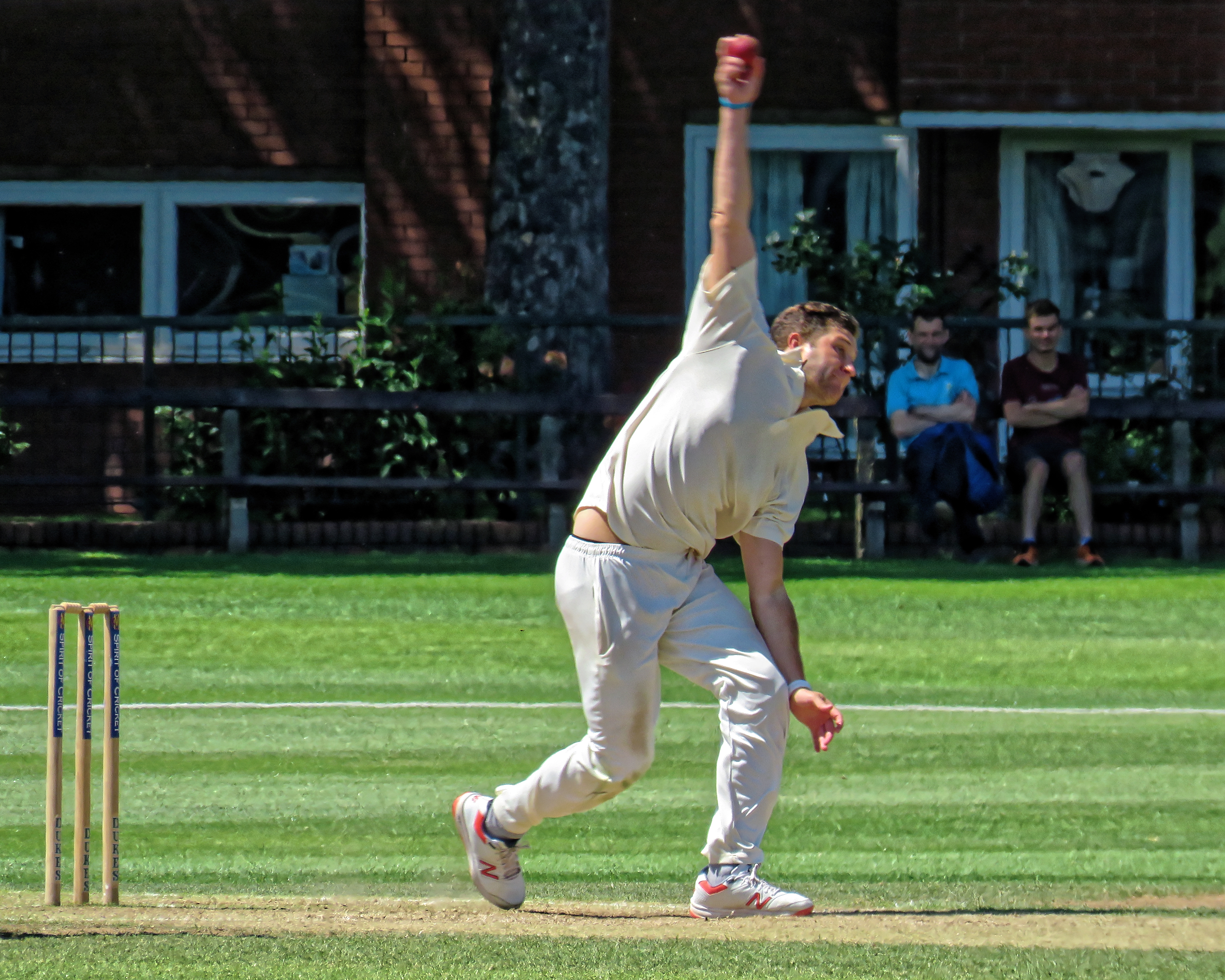
A bowler at the point of release

=== Front foot contact ===
Front foot contact is the position of the bowler at the moment when the front foot hits the ground just prior to delivering the ball. For a right-handed bowler the front foot is normally the left foot.

== Point of release ==
The point of release is the position of the ball in relation to the body at the moment when the ball is released. It is crucial for the arm to be stiff, not bent, and the wrist rather looser, to ensure smooth release of the ball, and sufficient bounce off the pitch. Otherwise, the action will resemble chucking. The left shoulder ought to be somewhat towards the stumps, the arm beside the bowler falling away, having just before this stage been pointing directly at the stumps.

For fast bowlers at the point of release the back of hand will be facing in the opposite direction of the batsmen facing the pending delivery. The front of the upright wrist and tips of the index and middle fingers all point to the target. For spin bowlers the wrist may well be at various angles at release point. This is because one is trying to create drag on a particular side of the ball, not propel it straight as per the section above.

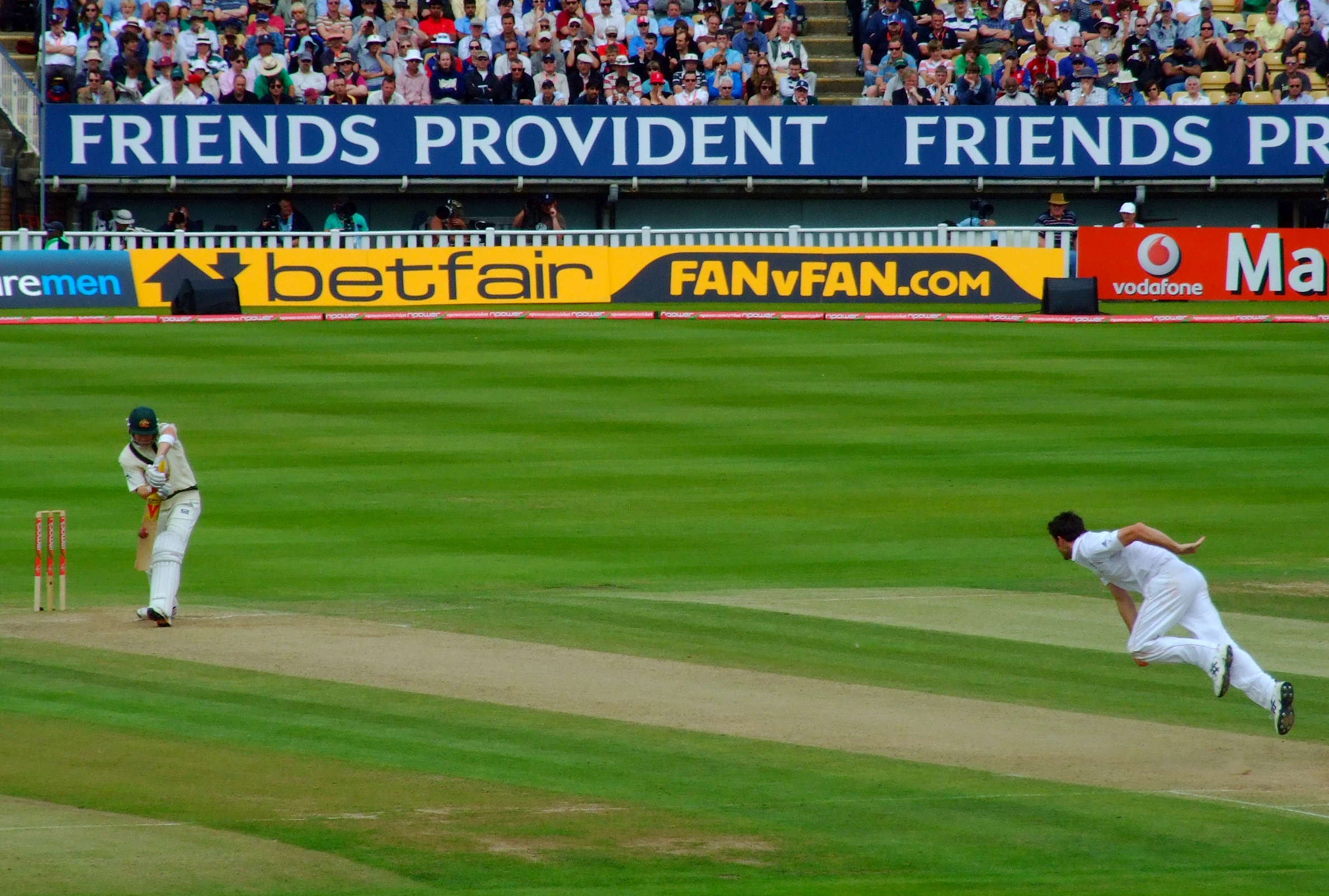
James Anderson in his follow through while bowling to Michael Clarke.

== Follow through ==
The follow through is the motion of the bowler after releasing the ball.

== See also ==
- Cricket terminology
- Throwing (cricket)
