= Benjamin Wilson =

Benjamin, Benny, Bennie, or Ben Wilson may refer to:

== Arts and entertainment ==
- Benjamin Wilson (painter) (1721–1788), English painter and scientist
- Ben F. Wilson (1876–1930), American actor, director, screenwriter and producer
- Ben Wilson (American artist) (1913–2001), American abstract expressionist
- Ben Wilson (English artist) (born 1963), English wood carver and outsider artist
- Ben Wilson (musician) (born 1967), American musician and keyboardist for the band Blues Traveler

== Politics ==
- Benjamin Davis Wilson (a.k.a. Don Benito Wilson, 1811–1878), American landowner and politician in California
- Benjamin Wilson (congressman) (1825–1901), American politician, U.S. representative from West Virginia
- Benjamin Franklin Wilson (politician) (1851–1937), American politician from Oklahoma
- Benjamin H. Wilson (1925–1988), American politician in the Pennsylvania House of Representatives
- Ben Wilson, 4th Baron Nunburnholme (1928–1998), British peer

== Sports ==
=== Cricket ===
- Benjamin Wilson (New Zealand cricketer) (1870-1929), New Zealand cricketer
- Benny Wilson (1879–1957), English cricketer
- Ben Wilson (English cricketer) (1921–1993), English cricketer

=== Other sports ===
- Bennie Wilson (1891–?), American Negro leagues baseball player
- Ben Wilson (American football coach) (1926–1970), American football coach
- Ben Wilson (fullback) (1939–2023), American football player
- Behn Wilson (born 1958), Canadian ice hockey player
- Ben Wilson (basketball) (1967–1984), American basketball player
- Benjamin Wilson (referee) (born 1975), Australian football referee
- Ben Wilson (kitesurfer), Australian kitesurfer
- Ben Wilson (Australian footballer) (born 1977), Australian rules footballer
- Ben Wilson (motorcyclist) (born 1982), English superbike rider
- Ben Wilson (speedway rider) (born 1986), English speedway rider
- Ben Wilson (footballer, born 1992), English footballer
- Ben Wilson (footballer, born 2001), footballer from Northern Ireland

== Others ==
- Benjamin Wilson (biblical scholar) (1817–1900), English biblical scholar, co-founder of the Church of God of the Abrahamic Faith
- Benjamin F. Wilson (1922–1988), American soldier and Medal of Honor recipient
- Ben Wilson (author) (born 1980), British historian
