= List of England Test wicket-keepers =

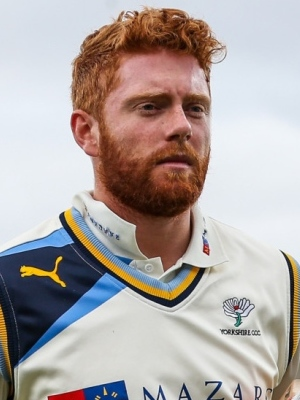
Jonny Bairstow, former England Test wicket-keeper

This is a chronological list of England Test wicket-keepers. The list comprises players who were the designated wicket-keeper at the toss, so the number of matches does not include times when a player has acted as a stand-in keeper, or appeared as a batsman only.

Alan Knott kept wicket in 95 Test matches for England, and is currently the record-holder, both in terms of caps as wicket keeper, and dismissals. Godfrey Evans is the record-holder for stumpings. A number of the players listed have played a large number of Test matches as specialist batsmen, for example Jonny Bairstow has played 100 Tests in total, as of March 2024.

On occasions, another player has stepped in to relieve the primary wicket-keeper due to injury or illness. Unless the relief player was himself a recognised Test wicket-keeper, he is not included here. The list also does not include Billy Murdoch, who kept in the second innings of his only Test for England, having previously appeared as wicket-keeper in one of his 18 Tests for Australia. He, Jonny Bairstow and Jordan Cox are the only replacement keepers to make a stumping for England. Ten stand-in keepers have taken a total of 19 catches as replacements, including six by Jonny Bairstow.

Bairstow and Buttler are unique in that they are both considered specialist wicket keepers for their county teams in first-class cricket, but both have been in the same Test team on multiple occasions with one of them playing as a batsman - more usually with Buttler behind the stumps, but on a few occasions with Bairstow as the designated keeper: and furthermore, both have stood in as keeper for the other due to injury or illness, and both have even made a dismissal under the circumstances while standing in for each other.

On one occasion in 1986, two replacement wicket-keepers were called on, neither of whom were members of the side, and one was a member of the crowd. Former England keeper, Bob Taylor, aged 45 and retired from professional cricket, stepped in at a Test match to replace Bruce French, with the permission of the New Zealand captain, after French had been hit in the head while batting. Taylor's appearance was delayed until third over of the innings, because a suitable playing kit had to be found and tailored to fit him: thus for the first two overs, the role of keeper was temporarily filled by specialist batsman Bill Athey (a member of the playing team) while another substitute fielded in the outfield. Later, Hampshire's Bobby Parks, (son of former England wicket keeper Jim Parks) who did not otherwise make a Test appearance in his career, arrived at lunch on the fourth day, and took over from Taylor for the rest of the day. Bruce French was deemed to have recovered from his injury, and took his position at the start of the fifth day, but was barely needed: only one ball was bowled, and New Zealand lost their last wicket to it. None of the four keepers made a dismissal in the innings.

Statistics are correct as of 13 September 2026.

No.	Player	County/counties	Span	Tests	Catches	Stumpings	Total dismissals
1	John Selby^{[A]}	Nottinghamshire	1877	2	1	0	1
2	Leland Hone	MCC	1879	1	2	0	2
3	Alfred Lyttelton	Middlesex	1880–1884	4	2	0	2
4	Dick Pilling	Lancashire	1881–1888	8	10	4	14
5	Edmund Tylecote	Kent	1882–1886	6	5	5	10
6	Joe Hunter	Yorkshire	1884–1885	5	8	3	11
7	Mordecai Sherwin	Nottinghamshire	1887–1888	3	5	2	7
8	Henry Wood	Kent and Surrey	1888–1892	4	2	1	3
9	Gregor MacGregor^{[B]}	Middlesex	1890–1893	7	14	3	17
10	Punch Philipson	Middlesex	1892–1895	5	8	3	11
11	Leslie Gay	Hampshire and Somerset	1894	1	3	1	4
12	Harry Butt	Sussex	1896	3	1	1	2
13	Dick Lilley	Warwickshire	1896–1909	35	70	22	92
14	Bill Storer	Derbyshire	1897–1899	6	11	0	11
15	Jack Board	Gloucestershire	1899–1906	6	8	3	11
16	Leonard Moon^{[C]}	Middlesex	1906	1	1	0	1
17	Dick Young	Sussex	1907–1908	2	6	0	6
18	Joe Humphries	Derbyshire	1908	3	7	0	7
19	Bert Strudwick^{[D]}	Surrey	1910–1926	27	61	12	73
20	Neville Tufnell	Surrey	1910	1	0	1	1
21	Tiger Smith^{[E]}	Warwickshire	1911–1912	10	16	3	19
22	Arthur Dolphin	Yorkshire	1921	1	1	0	1
23	George Brown	Hampshire	1921–1923	7	9	3	12
24	George Street	Sussex	1923	1	0	1	1
25	George Wood	Kent	1924	3	5	1	6
26	George Duckworth	Lancashire	1924–1936	24	45	15	60
27	Rony Stanyforth	Yorkshire	1927–1928	4	7	2	9
28	Harry Elliott	Derbyshire	1928–1934	4	8	3	11
29	Harry Smith	Gloucestershire	1928	1	1	0	1
30	Les Ames^{[F]}	Kent	1929–1939	44	72	23	95
31	Tich Cornford	Sussex	1930	4	5	3	8
32	Bill Farrimond	Lancashire	1931–1935	4	5	2	7
33	Hopper Levett	Kent	1934	1	3	0	3
34	Fred Price	Middlesex	1938	1	2	0	2
35	Arthur Wood	Yorkshire	1938–1939	4	10	1	11
36	Paul Gibb^{[G]}	Essex and Yorkshire	1946	3	3	1	4
37	Godfrey Evans	Kent	1946–1959	91	173	46	219
38	Billy Griffith^{[H]}	Surrey and Sussex	1949	2	5	0	5
39	Arthur McIntyre^{[I]}	Surrey	1950–1955	2	7	0	7
40	Don Brennan	Yorkshire	1951	2	0	1	1
41	Dick Spooner	Warwickshire	1951–1955	7	10	2	12
42	Keith Andrew	Northamptonshire	1954–1963	2	1	0	1
43	Roy Swetman	Gloucestershire, Nottinghamshire and Surrey	1959–1960	11	24	2	26
44	Jim Parks^{[J]}	Sussex and Somerset	1960–1968	43	101	11	112
45	John Murray^{[K]}	Middlesex	1961–1967	20	52	3	55
46	Geoff Millman	Nottinghamshire	1961–1962	6	13	2	15
47	Alan Smith	Warwickshire	1962–1963	6	20	0	20
48	Jimmy Binks	Yorkshire	1964	2	8	0	8
49	Alan Knott	Kent	1967–1981	95	250	19	269
50	Bob Taylor	Derbyshire	1971–1984	57	167	7	174
51	David Bairstow	Yorkshire	1979–1981	4	12	1	13
52	Paul Downton	Kent and Middlesex	1981–1988	30	70	5	75
53	Bruce French	Nottinghamshire	1986–1988	16	38	1	39
54	Jack Richards	Surrey	1986–1988	8	20	1	21
55	Jack Russell	Gloucestershire	1988–1998	54	153	12	165
56	Alec Stewart^{[L]}	Surrey	1991–2003	82	227	14	241
57	Richard Blakey	Yorkshire	1993	2	2	0	2
58	Steve Rhodes	Worcestershire	1994–1995	11	46	3	49
59	Warren Hegg	Lancashire	1998–1999	2	8	0	8
60	Chris Read	Nottinghamshire	1999–2007	15	48	6	54
61	James Foster	Essex	2001–2002	7	17	1	18
62	Geraint Jones	Kent	2004–2006	34	128	5	133
63	Matt Prior	Sussex	2007–2014	79	243	13	256
64	Tim Ambrose	Warwickshire	2008–2009	11	31	0	31
65	Jonny Bairstow^{[M]}	Yorkshire	2013–2023	55	198	13	211
66	Jos Buttler^{[N]}	Lancashire	2014–2022	37	130	1	131
67	Ben Foakes	Surrey	2018–2024	21	57	8	63
68	Ollie Pope^{[O]}	Surrey	2019–2024	6	22	1	23
69	James Bracey	Gloucestershire	2021	2	6	0	6
70	Sam Billings	Kent	2022	2	7	0	7
71	Jamie Smith	Surrey	2024–2026	25	77	2	79
72	James Rew	Somerset	2026	1	3	0	3

== See also ==
- List of English Test cricketers

== Notes ==
- ^{A} Selby appeared in four further Tests as a fielder, taking no catches.
- ^{B} MacGregor appeared in one further Test as a fielder, taking no catches.
- ^{C} Moon appeared in three further Tests as a fielder, taking three catches.
- ^{B} Strudwick appeared in one further Test as a fielder, taking no catches.
- ^{E} Smith appeared in one further Test as a fielder, taking one catch.
- ^{F} Ames appeared in three further Tests as a fielder, taking two catches.
- ^{G} Gibb appeared in five further Tests as a fielder, taking no catches.
- ^{H} Griffith appeared in one further Test as a fielder, taking no catches.
- ^{I} McIntyre appeared in one further Test as a fielder, taking one catch.
- ^{J} Parks appeared in three further Tests as a fielder, taking two catches.
- ^{K} Murray appeared in one further Test as a fielder, taking no catches.
- ^{L} Stewart appeared in 51 further Tests as a fielder, taking 36 catches.
- ^{M} Bairstow has appeared in 40 further Tests as a fielder, taking 36 catches. He stood in as wicket-keeper for Foakes and Buttler in six of these games, taking two catches and one stumping; and 19 catches respectively.
- ^{N} Buttler has appeared in 20 further Tests as a fielder, taking 23 catches. He stood in as wicket-keeper for Bairstow in one of these games.
- ^{O} Pope has appeared in 58 further Tests as a fielder, taking 57 catches.
