= History of Yorkshire County Cricket Club (1883–1918) =

Cricket club history

The history of Yorkshire County Cricket Club from 1883 to 1918 covers the period from the beginning of Lord Hawke's captaincy until the end of the First World War. The county club had been founded in 1863 by members of the Sheffield Cricket Club whose officials still retained overall control twenty years later, despite the club's stated purpose of representing the whole county of Yorkshire. Complaints from the membership brought about a gradual reorganisation of the committee and, in 1902, the club's offices were relocated from Sheffield to Leeds. While the greatest challenge facing Hawke on his appointment was to unite the club's geographical and social factions, he also had to unite and instil discipline into a team with a reputation for inconsistency and wayward behaviour. Hawke was ultimately successful and, during this period of their history, Yorkshire won the County Championship nine times, the first eight under Hawke's captaincy. These achievements were primarily due to the production of outstanding players who were moulded by Hawke into an efficient, professional unit: they included such great individuals as George Hirst, Wilfred Rhodes and Stanley Jackson.

== Hawke's challenges ==
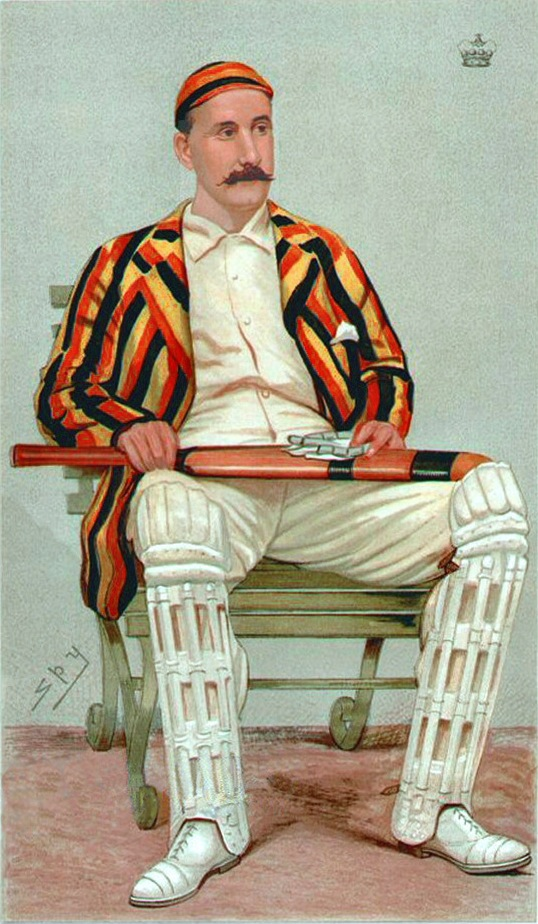
Caricature of Lord Hawke by Spy, first published in Vanity Fair on 24 September 1892 with the caption "Yorkshire Cricket".

In an obituary tribute, the editor of Wisden Cricketers' Almanack said that Lord Hawke's "strength of character was tested" when, as a young man on leaving Cambridge, he undertook the responsibility of captaining the Yorkshire side, composed at that time of "elements that were not entirely harmonious". Owing to Hawke's "tact, judgement and integrity", he moulded the Eleven into "the best and probably the most united county cricket team in England".

Yorkshire to 1883 was popularly viewed as a team of gifted players with a drink problem and was sometimes described as "ten drunks and a parson", the odd man out being Louis Hall, a Nonconformist lay preacher who had joined the club in 1873 as an opening batsman and was reputedly the first teetotaller ever to play for it.

Although Hawke's primary task as captain was to eradicate the perceived drink problem and lead the team to fulfilment of its potential, his biggest challenge was to unite the club's geographical and social factions. Ever since the foundation in 1863, all fourteen members of the County Committee were elected by Sheffield districts; and all fourteen of these committee men plus the Secretary Joseph Wostinholm were loyal to the President and Treasurer, Michael Ellison. As a result, Ellison and Sheffield effectively controlled Yorkshire cricket. Edmund Carter was one of Ellison's main critics and opponents.

== Reorganisation of the committee ==
At the end of the 1882 season, in addition to appointing Hawke as captain, the committee agreed to reorganise itself for the first time since the club's foundation. Admitting that it should represent the views of Yorkshire as a whole, the committee enlarged itself by inviting seven new members: one each from Bradford, Dewsbury, Halifax, Huddersfield, Hull, Leeds and York to join the existing 14 from Sheffield. So, although the other districts now had a voice, the "ruling Sheffield clique" retained complete control.

Edmund Carter was York's representative and he continued to pursue the issue of representation. Hawke at this time had minimal influence and cannot be seen as anything more than an instrument of change, though his appointment as captain did represent a watershed in the club's history. Whatever the extent of Hawke's involvement in the 1882 machinations, ten years would pass before Yorkshire was fully reorganised to end the Sheffield area's domination and, coincidentally, it was in 1893 that Hawke's team won its first County Championship.

== Amateurs and professionals ==
Before the appointment of Hawke in 1883, there had been few amateur cricketers in the Yorkshire team, in contrast to the largely amateur county teams in southern England. Although eight amateurs played for Yorkshire in 1882, there were complaints that the committee preferred to play professionals, which was unusual and frowned on by the cricket establishment at the time. This arose partly from the unavailability of suitably talented amateurs and a clash between the county club and the Yorkshire Gentlemen team, based in York, for whom many amateurs appeared. Some amateurs had a reputation for unreliability and the committee believed that the team frequently lost matches when amateurs appeared.

== Transition: 1883 to 1892 ==
Hawke gradually took over from Emmett in 1883 and would remain as official captain for 27 years. He was careful to take his time and did not make too many changes at first. Although beaten to the Championship by Nottinghamshire, Yorkshire improved in 1883, achieving an unofficial second place, although some authorities named Yorkshire as champions. However, the remainder of the 1880s was disappointing for the team and its supporters. Yorkshire "continued to be an unreliable side, mingling brilliant achievement with miserable performance". However, Hawke greatly admired Emmett, George Ulyett, Ted Peate and Billy Bates who all represented England. The basic problem was that the older players were past their peak while younger replacements did not make the progress expected. The culmination came when the club, with a side weakened by sackings and retirements, finished in second-last position in the unofficial county table in 1889, with twelve defeats; the fielding was particularly poor. The poor form of the team was reflected in financial disappointment off the field.

At the end of the 1889 season, several players were cut from the team, probably at the instigation of Hawke. Ellison, the Yorkshire President, named drunkenness as a factor in comments to the committee. However, the poor results seem to have been anticipated and several players made their debuts in 1889 and 1890 who would go on to be successful for the club, including Jack Brown, David Hunter and Stanley Jackson, while Bobby Peel was becoming increasingly effective as a bowling all-rounder. However, these players took time to become established and stalwarts of the team in the previous decade, such as Louis Hall and George Ulyett, were coming to the end of their careers. The additional strain of the absence of players selected for representative games meant that a slight revival in 1890 to third in the first official County Championship table, was followed by another poor season in 1891 when the team finished eighth out of nine. Criticism of the management produced "self-defence in the annual report" and, in 1893, the club was reorganised to properly represent the whole county. Further reorganisation came when Ellison died in 1898 and Hawke assumed the club presidency as well as captaincy; when Wostinholm retired in 1902 after being club secretary for 38 years, the county offices were moved from Sheffield to the more central location of Leeds.

Yorkshire improved during 1892, making a good start to the season by being undefeated until mid-June but fading badly to finish sixth. More promise for the future came in the debut of John Tunnicliffe and David Denton and the success of some of the younger players.

== Yorkshire's first titles: 1893 to 1896 ==
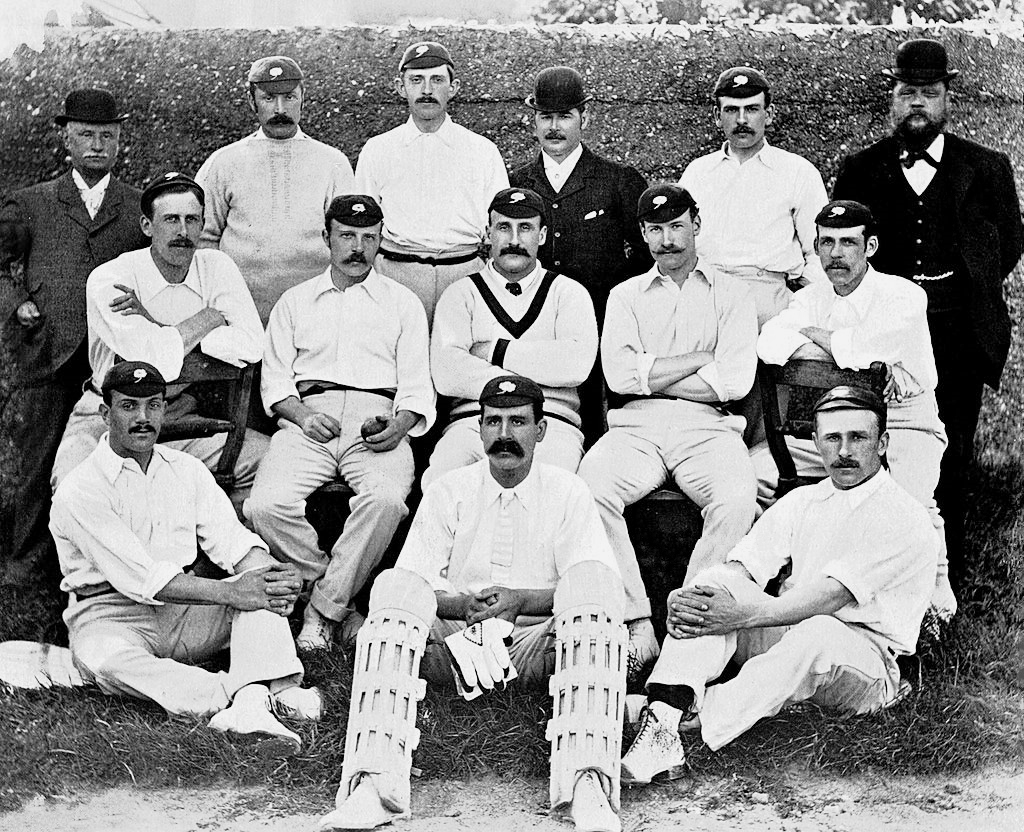
Yorkshire County Cricket Club XI in 1895, captained by Lord Hawke

In 1893, the same year that the club was finally reorganised, Yorkshire won their first official County Championship after a season in which no individual stood out but the team performed successfully as a unit; Hodgson writes it was "perhaps ... the first confirmation of Hawke's striving for teamwork and discipline". This season was the only one of the first six in Championship history which Surrey did not win and the southern county added victories in 1894 and 1895 as Yorkshire achieved second and third places respectively. But the team continued to develop as Brown and Tunnicliffe established an effective opening partnership, Denton proved an effective, fast scoring batsman and Jackson showed himself to be a quality all-rounder and Peel, Ted Wainwright and the emerging George Hirst carried the bowling attack. The fielding also became far more specialised and efficient.

Yorkshire historian R.S. Holmes described Yorkshire as "prodigious" in 1896, when the batsmen scored 17 individual centuries and 12 men averaged more than 20 with the bat. In a good summer for batting, the team scored more than 400 runs in an innings five times, with scores of 543 against Sussex, 660 against Leicestershire and 887 against Warwickshire. The latter innings, containing four centuries and lasting more than two days, remains the highest total in the County Championship, as of February 2011. The debut of Schofield Haigh strengthened a bowling attack which already contained four front-line bowlers and Yorkshire won their second County Championship.

== Winter payments and increased membership ==
That winter, Hawke began the practice of paying the professionals over the winter, initially £2 per week; the scheme was later modified to include bonuses. Yorkshire fell to fourth place in 1897. Peel was sacked after appearing drunk on the field at Chesterfield after being left out of the side. He was replaced in the team for the next season by Wilfred Rhodes, who took 141 wickets for Yorkshire in a wet season which produced a succession of pitches helpful to spinners. Rhodes would remain in the team until 1930, scoring 39,772 runs and taking 4,184 wickets in his first-class career. In the same season, Brown and Tunnicliffe established a record partnership for the first wicket when they scored 554 against Derbyshire at Chesterfield. Good performances in the season from Jackson, Haigh and Tunnicliffe brought Yorkshire their third Championship and, despite injuries and poor form hampering Yorkshire the following year, only a defeat late in the season by Kent prevented the retention of the title.

The increased appeal of the club following the reorganisation during the 1890s and its increasing success on the field resulted in the membership increasing from around 175 in 1893 to almost 1,000 in 1897 and over 3,000 in 1903.

== Three successive titles: 1900 to 1902 ==
Between 1900 and 1902, Yorkshire lost only twice in the County Championship, both times to Somerset. In 1900, the team won the Championship without losing to another county, and Rhodes and Haigh dominated the bowling; only two teams scored more than 300 against them. The following season, Rhodes and Hirst were the successful bowlers as injury curtailed Haigh's season. In effect, only 13 players appeared for Yorkshire as the Championship was retained. However, the match against Somerset at Headingley provided a surprise. The visitors had scored just 87 and Yorkshire established a big lead with a total of 325. But Somerset scored 630 in the second innings and dismissed the County Champions for 111, winning by 279 runs. In contrast, Nottinghamshire were bowled out for only 13 runs a month later. After this season, important batsman Frank Mitchell departed to live in South Africa, but Jackson, who had been fighting in the Boer War since 1900, returned. Yorkshire won their third successive Championship in 1902 as Haigh and Rhodes resumed their successful pairing; in May and June, no opposing batting line-up managed to score 130 for 13 successive innings. However, Somerset again defeated Yorkshire.

Joseph Wolstinholm retired as club secretary after the 1902 season and was succeeded by Frederick Toone who had previously been the secretary at Leicestershire. Toone held the post until his death in June 1930 and formed a successful liaison with Hawke, who praised him for increasing the membership from 3,000 in 1903 to over 7,000 ten years later. Toone and Hawke worked together to improve the terms and conditions of professional players' contracts. To 1914, they were paid £5 for a home match and £6 for an away match with a £1 win bonus. Players who had received their county cap were obliged to join the Cricketers' Friendly Society and were paid a winter wage of £2 a week.

== 1903 to 1914 ==
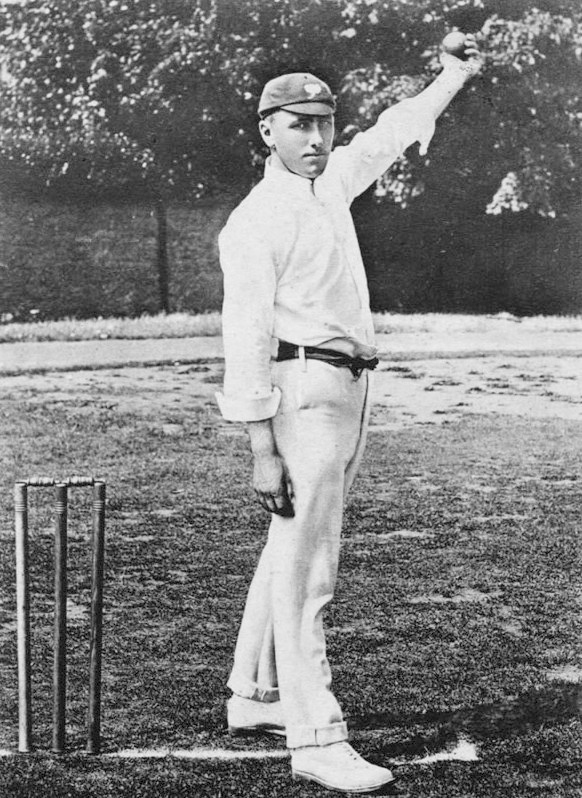
Wilfred Rhodes made his debut in 1898 and went on to take a record 3,598 wickets for Yorkshire.

Yorkshire remained a strong championship contender through the 1903 to 1914 seasons and won a further three titles in this period, also finishing as runners-up three times. They won their seventh title in 1905 after being third and second in 1903 and 1904 respectively.

In 1906, George Hirst achieved a unique "double-double" by scoring 2,385 runs and taking 208 wickets, but the true mark of his greatness as a player was "the capacity to succeed in the hours of greatest need". Wilfred Rhodes, meanwhile, set himself the goal of improving his batting to be recognised as a genuine all-rounder in his own right and was so successful that he rose from no.11 in the order to become Jack Hobbs' regular England opening partner. David Denton scored 2,000 runs in a season four times and, in the wet summer of 1912, only he and Hobbs achieved the target.

The 1906 championship was decided on the last day of the season. Yorkshire lost to Gloucestershire by a single run and were overtaken by Kent, who won their last match against Hampshire by an innings. Having finished third in 1907, Yorkshire went through the 1908 season unbeaten and bowled Northamptonshire out for 27 and 15, the aggregate score of 42 being the lowest in English first-class cricket. "Old Ebor" called 1908 the "clean sheet championship" and only twice in all matches did Yorkshire concede 300 in an innings.

Yorkshire finished third in 1909 but then dropped to eighth and seventh in the next two seasons before a recovery in 1912 brought their last title before the First World War. While Hirst, Rhodes and Denton continued to excel, Yorkshire gained much in the last four years before the war from two new all-rounders, Major Booth and Alonzo Drake, both of whom were an outstanding success. Another newcomer was Arthur Dolphin, who replaced the retired David Hunter as first-choice wicketkeeper. In 1913 and the unfinished 1914 season, Yorkshire finished second and fourth.

Lord Hawke played only a few matches in 1909 and formally resigned as captain in 1910. He was succeeded by Everard Radcliffe, who held the post until the end of the 1911 season; and then by Sir Archibald White, who led the team until the outbreak of the First World War in August 1914.

== Bibliography ==
- Hodgson, Derek (1989). The Official History of Yorkshire County Cricket Club. The Crowood Press. ISBN 1-85223-274-9.
- Kilburn, J.M. (1970). A History of Yorkshire Cricket. Stanley Paul. ISBN 0-09-101110-8.
- Swanton, E.W. (1986). Barclays World of Cricket. Willow Books. ISBN 0-00-218193-2.
- Woodhouse, Anthony (1989). The History of Yorkshire County Cricket Club. London: Christopher Helm. ISBN 0-7470-3408-7.
