= Arthur Dolphin =

English cricketer

Personal information
- Full name: Arthur Dolphin
- Born: 24 December 1885; Wilsden, Bingley, Yorkshire, England
- Died: 23 October 1942 (aged 56); Lilycroft, Heaton, Bradford, Yorkshire, England
- Batting: Right-handed

International information
- National side: England
- Only Test (cap 188): 11 February 1921 v Australia

Domestic team information
- Years: Team
- 1905–1927: Yorkshire

Umpiring information
- Tests umpired: 6 (1933–1938)
- FC umpired: 249 (1926–1939)

Career statistics
Competition	Test	First-class
Matches	1	449
Runs scored	1	3,402
Batting average	0.50	11.30
100s/50s	0/0	0/7
Top score	1	66
Balls bowled	–	66
Wickets	–	1
Bowling average	–	28.00
5 wickets in innings	–	0
10 wickets in match	–	0
Best bowling	–	1/18
Catches/stumpings	1/0	610/272
- Source: CricketArchive, 16 June 2013

Arthur Dolphin (24 December 1885 – 23 October 1942) was an English first-class cricketer, who kept wicket for Yorkshire County Cricket Club between 1905 and 1927. He is part of a tradition of Yorkshire wicket-keepers, stretching from Ned Stephenson, George Pinder, Joe Hunter and David Hunter before him, to Arthur Wood, Jimmy Binks, David Bairstow plus Richard Blakey to the present day. The successor to David Hunter as Yorkshire's wicket-keeper he served the county for twenty two years.

He also played first-class cricket for the Marylebone Cricket Club (MCC).

== Career ==
Dolphin was born in Wilsden, Bingley, Yorkshire, England, and became the first Bradford League player chosen to represent Yorkshire. Dolphin was 14 years old when he first played for Wilsden Britannia, and 19 when he made his county debut in 1905. After playing for the Yorkshire Second XI, he took over as Yorkshire's first choice wicket keeper in 1910, and retained his position for seventeen years.

He served in World War I alongside his county colleagues, Roy Kilner and Major Booth, with the Leeds Pals but returned to Yorkshire's ranks in 1919, and enjoyed his most successful season with the gloves claiming 82 dismissals in the first post-war summer. Dolphin could defend with the bat when needed, as exemplified by his vigil against Essex at Leyton in 1919. He scored 62 not out, and with E. Smith put on 103 for the last wicket, so saving their side from following-on when Yorkshire were in danger of doing so. He had previous form against Essex in 1914, going into bat as the nightwatchman, he added 124 for the second wicket with Benjamin Wilson. His one Test match came in 1920–21 in the Fourth Test against Australia.

He was remarkably consistent once he had won his first team place, but when he was injured it came about in unusual circumstances. Playing against Middlesex at Lord's, he fell off a chair in the dressing-room as he reached for his clothes and broke his wrist, missing the remainder of the summer of 1921. His benefit match in 1922 against Kent at Headingley, Leeds raised £1,891 and he hit the winning runs, after scoring 20 of the 24 required to win, to secure victory by ten wickets. He suffered from sciatica in the latter part of his career, and he played his last match for Yorkshire in 1927.

Herbert Sutcliffe observed Dolphin and wrote: "His quick brain and exceptionally keen eyesight were responsible for disposing of large numbers of batsmen from chances which many keepers would have missed without even affecting their reputations". Nearly a third of Dolphin's dismissals were stumpings.

After retiring as a player, Dolphin became an umpire for a decade and officiated in six Tests.

Dolphin died in Lilycroft, Heaton, Bradford, Yorkshire, at the age of 56 in October 1942.
