= Edwin Woodward =

English cricketer

Personal information
- Full name: Edwin Woodward
- Born: 17 September 1864; Sutton-in-Ashfield, Nottinghamshire, England
- Died: 15 December 1953 (aged 89); Mansfield, Nottinghamshire, England
- Batting: Right-handed
- Bowling: Right-arm medium

Career statistics
Competition	First-class
Matches	2
Runs scored	19
Batting average	4.75
100s/50s	–/–
Top score	13
Balls bowled	187
Wickets	2
Bowling average	25.00
5 wickets in innings	–
10 wickets in match	–
Best bowling	2/38
Catches/stumpings	1/–
- Source: Cricinfo, 3 January 2015

Edwin Woodward (17 September 1864 – 15 December 1953) was an English cricketer active in the late 1880s and beginning of the 1890s. Born at Sutton-in-Ashfield, Nottinghamshire, Woodward was a right-handed batsman and right-arm medium pace bowler who made two appearances in first-class cricket.

Woodward made his debut in first-class cricket for Liverpool and District against the touring Australians in 1888 at Aigburth Cricket Ground, Liverpool. He played a second first-class match for Liverpool and District in 1890 against Yorkshire, during which he took the wickets of Louis Hall and Jack Brown, which were his only wickets in first-class cricket.

He died at Mansfield, Nottinghamshire on 3 January 1953.
