= David Hunter (English cricketer) =

English cricketer

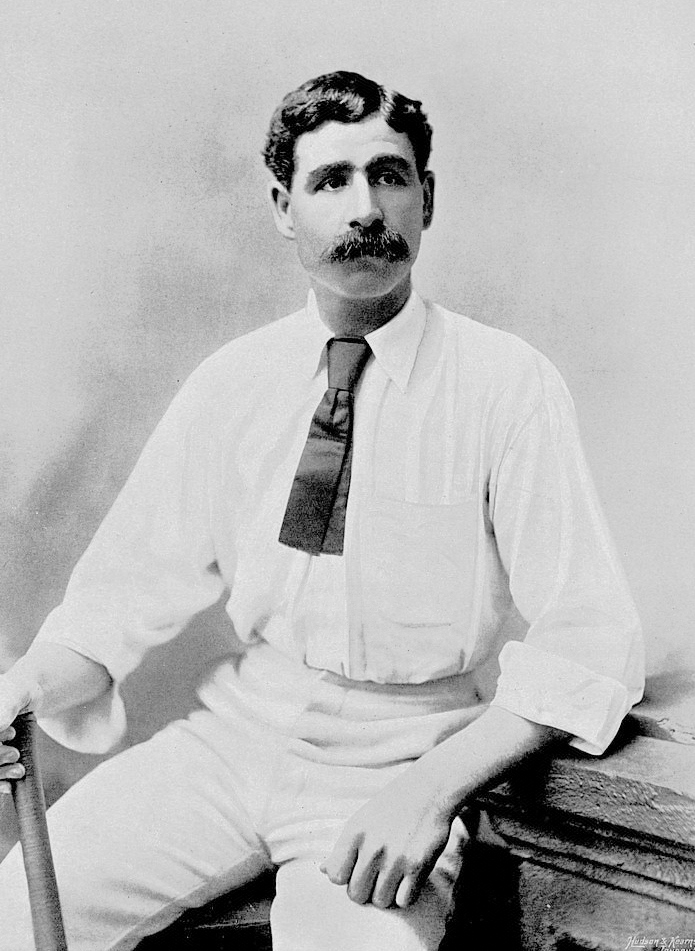
- Hunter pictured in about 1895

Personal information
- Born: 23 February 1860; Scarborough, North Riding of Yorkshire, England
- Died: 11 January 1927 (aged 66); Northstead, Scarborough, England
- Batting: Right-handed
- Role: Wicket-keeper
- Relatives: Joe Hunter (brother)

Domestic team information
- Years: Team
- 1888–1909: Yorkshire

Career statistics
Competition	First-class
Matches	552
Runs scored	4,538
Batting average	12.03
100s/50s	0/0
Top score	58
Balls bowled	42
Wickets	0
Bowling average	–
5 wickets in innings	–
10 wickets in match	–
Best bowling	–
Catches/stumpings	913/350
- Source: CricInfo, 23 April 2023

David Hunter (23 February 1860 – 11 January 1927) was part of a lineage of Yorkshire County Cricket Club wicket-keepers, stretching on through Arthur Dolphin to Arthur Wood, Jimmy Binks and David Bairstow. Hunter played 517 first-class games for Yorkshire between 1888 and 1909.

== Life and career ==
Born in Scarborough, Yorkshire, Hunter also appeared in first-class cricket for Lord Hawke's XI (1889), North of England (1889–1907), L Hall's XI (1889), Players (1890–1909), Hurst Park Club (1890), L Hall's Yorkshire XI (1891), XI of Yorkshire (1894), Over 30 (1901), CI Thornton's XI (1902–1905), Lancashire and Yorkshire (1903–1909), Rest of England (1904) and Lord Londesborough's XI (1909).

In 552 matches in total, he took 913 catches and completed 350 stumpings. A modest right-handed tailend batsman, he compiled 4,538 runs at an average of 12.03, with a best of 58 not out against Worcestershire. Over the years, he held up his end in stands of 53, 148, 121, 118 and 102 for the tenth wicket. He did bowl 42 balls as well, conceding 43 runs and not taking a wicket.

He succeeded his brother Joe Hunter as the Yorkshire wicket-keeper at the relatively late age of 28, but was then an almost ever present player for the following two decades. It is a testament to his 'good hands' that he never suffered a serious finger injury, nor were his hands damaged at the end of his career, despite the comparatively crude equipment and heavy workload of the time. In Louis Hall's benefit match against Surrey at Sheffield in 1891, he caught five men and stumped one in an innings, and against the same county seven years later, claimed eight of the twenty wickets, catching two and stumping six at Bradford. He was a doughty performer right up to the end of his career, making six catches in an innings, again against Surrey, at Headingley in his last year.

He helped Yorkshire win the County Championship eight times, and received £1,975 from his benefit in the Roses match against Lancashire at Bradford in 1897.

Hunter died in January 1927 in Northstead, Scarborough, at the age of 66.
