= Joe Hunter (cricketer) =

English cricketer (1885–1945)

Personal information
- Full name: Joseph Hunter
- Born: 3 August 1855; Scarborough, Yorkshire
- Died: 4 January 1891 (aged 35); Rotherham, Yorkshire
- Batting: Right-handed
- Role: Wicket-keeper

International information
- National side: England
- Test debut (cap 49): 12 December 1884 v Australia
- Last Test: 25 March 1885 v Australia

Domestic team information
- Years: Team
- 1878–1888: Yorkshire
- 1880: United South of England Eleven
- 1884–1885: Players

Career statistics
Competition	Test	First-class
Matches	5	162
Runs scored	93	1,330
Batting average	18.60	7.86
100s/50s	0/0	0/2
Top score	39*	60*
Catches/stumpings	8/3	232/124
- Source: CricketArchive, 8 October 2022

Joseph Hunter (3 August 1855 – 4 January 1891) was an English professional cricketer who played for Yorkshire County Cricket Club from 1878 to 1888, and in five Test matches for England in 1884–85. He was born at Scarborough, Yorkshire, and died at Rotherham, Yorkshire.

Hunter was a wicket-keeper who played in 162 first-class matches. He held 232 career catches and completed 124 stumpings. He was a right-handed tail-end batsman and scored 1,330 runs at an average of 7.86 runs per completed innings with a highest score of 60* as one of two half-centuries.

== Career ==
Joe Hunter, one of five brothers, was born in Scarborough, Yorkshire. He learned his cricket by playing on the beach at Scarborough.

=== Yorkshire ===
Hunter made his first-class debut for Yorkshire in 1878 when he stood in for George Pinder, who had been injured. He played in ten matches during July and August until Pinder could return. Hunter's debut was in a Roses Match against Lancashire at Old Trafford on 11–12 July. It did not go well because Lancashire won by an innings and 26 runs with more than a day to spare. Lancashire batted first and scored 267, having been 266/9 overnight. Hunter did not dismiss any of their batsmen. Yorkshire collapsed twice on the second day, scoring 123 and 118. A. G. Steel, who was noted for his expertise in "twisting (spinning) the ball from both sides of the wicket", took 5/49 and 9/63 for a match return of 14/112. Hunter was last in the Yorkshire batting line-up. He was caught by Steel off Alec Watson for 4 in his debut innings and then was the not out batsman with 8 in the second.

Hunter dismissed his first victims in Yorkshire's next match, which was against Surrey at Bramall Lane on 15–16 July. Yorkshire batted first and scored 309 all out. Hunter was number 10 in the batting order and scored 14. His first "victim" was John Shuter, whom he caught off George Ulyett for 13. Later, he caught Morice Clarke for 17 off Harry Pearson. Surrey were all out for 78. In the second innings, Hunter caught James Southerton off Tom Emmett for 10. Surrey were all out for 127 and Yorkshire won by an innings and 104 runs with a day to spare. In all, Hunter played in ten matches in 1878, scoring 73 runs with a highest innings of 17. He held 8 catches and completed 4 stumpings.

Hunter did not play for the county team in 1879 or 1880. Pinder retired after the 1880 season and Hunter succeeded him as Yorkshire's first-choice keeper from May 1881 until May 1888. In all, Hunter played in 162 first-class matches, 143 of them for Yorkshire. Pinder later praised Hunter as "a very good man".

By 1886, when Lord Hawke's captaincy of Yorkshire began in earnest, Hunter was one of the team's senior professionals. Hawke had until then been something of an amateur figurehead and had not played much cricket at all since 1882. From the beginning of the 1886 season, Hawke adopted a "new broom" philosophy with the determination of leading Yorkshire to success. While there was no longer any doubt that Hawke was in charge of the team, he always listened to his professionals and Joe Hunter was among a few who could offer "unsolicited advice" that Hawke would often heed.

=== Cricket magazine: portrait and biography ===
In its issue of 25 September 1884, published just after Hunter left for Australia with Alfred Shaw's XI, the magazine Cricket: A Weekly Record of the Game featured him on its front page. Cricket reminded its readers of the many famous fast bowlers used by Yorkshire since the club was founded in 1863 – among them George Freeman, Tom Emmett and George Ulyett – and the consequent need for a Yorkshire keeper to have courage as well as skill. Each of Ned Stephenson, George Pinder and Joe Hunter had "in turn bravely upheld the honour of Yorkshire for pluck in this responsible position". While Hunter was not "as good as Pilling or Sherwin", he was the obvious choice, when they were both unavailable, to stand in for the Players against the Australians at The Oval in July 1884 and to join Shaw's XI on the voyage to Australia for the 1884–85 tour. Cricket mentioned that Hunter was very much a tail-end batsman who had shown little improvement in that department but, in keeping wicket against fast bowling, he had "certainly no superiors".

=== Tour of Australia, 1884–85 ===
As mentioned in the Cricket feature, Hunter was invited to represent the Players against the 1884 Australians at The Oval on 31 July. This was because both Dick Pilling and Mordecai Sherwin were unavailable. It was a three-day match but the Australians won by 9 wickets with a day to spare. The Players, captained by Tom Emmett, won the toss and batted first but were bowled out by Fred Spofforth (8/62) for 107. Hunter was number 11 and scored 9 not out. Australia replied with 151 and Hunter completed three stumpings to dismiss Percy McDonnell, George Giffen and Tup Scott, who were all top-order batsmen. In the Players' second innings, Spofforth again destroyed the batting with 6/34 (a match return of 14/96). Hunter was again the not out batsman but this time without scoring. Australia quickly accounted for the 28 runs needed to win.

Hunter had made a good impression in the Players v Australians match and, when neither Pilling nor Sherwin accepted invitations for the tour of Australia in 1884–85, Hunter travelled instead. He played in all five Test matches. His first match on the tour was on 2 October during a stopover in Suez Port (at the southern end of the Suez Canal) against a 22-man team of British Army, Navy and civilian residents. Shaw's XI made 117 (Hunter 9*) and the 22 scored 40/11; the result was a draw. The team's ship docked in Port Adelaide on 29 October. Their first match in Australia began on the 31st against a South Australian XV at the Adelaide Oval. It was a five-day match which Shaw's XI won by 3 wickets. Hunter claimed six victims with three catches and three stumpings.

=== Ill-health and early death ===
Hunter was dogged by ill-health and was forced to retire from cricket during the 1888 season. He was succeeded as Yorkshire's wicket-keeper by his brother, David (1860–1927), who went on to play in 552 first-class matches until 1909. Joe Hunter's final match was at Lord's on 24–25 May 1888. Yorkshire led Middlesex by 15 runs after the first innings but were bowled out for 43 in their second, George Burton taking 7/18 (10/71 in the match). Middlesex won by 9 wickets. Hunter batted last in both innings and was out for 0 and 1. He did not dismiss any batsmen in the match.

Hunter was originally a stonemason in Scarborough. He later became a pub landlord, first in Scarborough, then in Doncaster and finally at the Wheatsheaf in Rotherham where he died, suddenly, in January 1891, aged 35. Wisden said Hunter at his best "was good enough for any county team", although he was not a top rank keeper like Dick Pilling or Mordecai Sherwin.

== Sources ==
- Coldham, James P. (1990). Lord Hawke – A Cricketing Biography. The Crowood Press. ISBN 978-18-52233-05-1.
- Hodgson, Derek (1989). The Official History of Yorkshire County Cricket Club. The Crowood Press. ISBN 1-85223-274-9.
