= George Hirst =

English cricketer

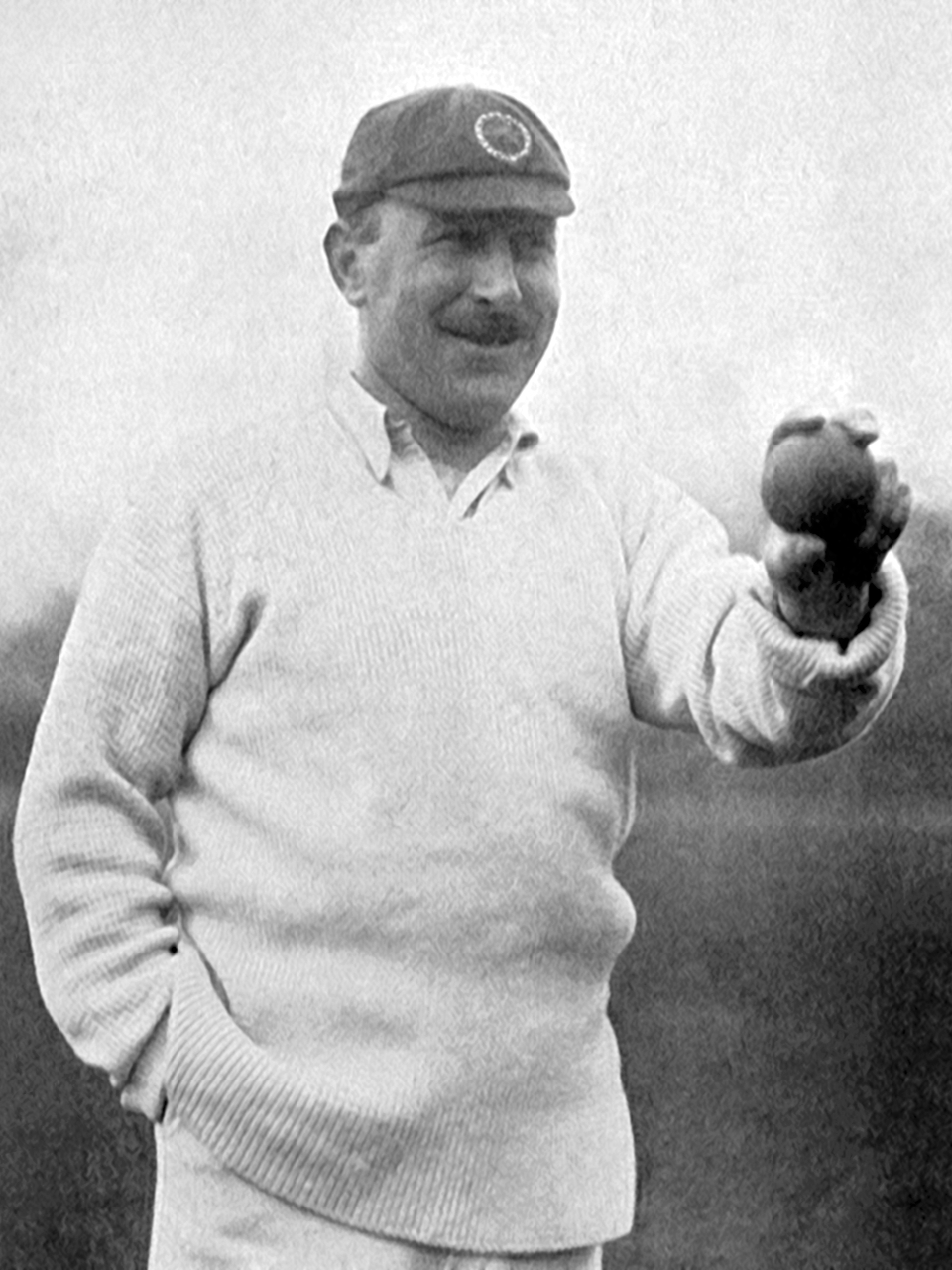
- Hirst showing his ball grip in 1906

Personal information
- Full name: George Herbert Hirst
- Born: 7 September 1871; Kirkheaton, Yorkshire, England
- Died: 10 May 1954 (aged 82); Lindley, Yorkshire, England
- Bowling: Left-arm medium-fast
- Role: All-rounder

International information
- National side: England (1897–1909)
- Test debut (cap 108): 13 December 1897 v Australia
- Last Test: 28 July 1909 v Australia

Domestic team information
- Years: Team
- 1891–1929: Yorkshire
- 1921–1922: Europeans (India)

Umpiring information
- FC umpired: 30 (1922–1938)

Career statistics
Competition	Test	First-class
Matches	24	826
Runs scored	790	36,356
Batting average	22.57	34.13
100s/50s	0/5	60/202
Top score	85	341
Balls bowled	4,010	123,387
Wickets	59	2,742
Bowling average	30.00	18.73
5 wickets in innings	3	184
10 wickets in match	0	40
Best bowling	5/48	9/23
Catches/stumpings	18/–	605/–
- Source: CricketArchive, 11 June 2012

George Herbert Hirst (7 September 1871 – 10 May 1954) was an English professional cricketer who played first-class cricket for Yorkshire County Cricket Club between 1891 and 1921, with a further appearance in 1929. One of the best all-rounders of his time, Hirst was a left arm medium-fast bowler and right-handed batsman. He played in 24 Test matches for England between 1897 and 1909, touring Australia twice. He completed the double of 1,000 runs and 100 wickets in an English cricket season 14 times, the second most of any cricketer after his contemporary and team-mate Wilfred Rhodes. One of the Wisden Cricketers of the Year for 1901, Hirst scored 36,356 runs and took 2,742 wickets in first-class cricket. In Tests, he made 790 runs and captured 59 wickets.

Born in Kirkheaton, Hirst first achieved success for Yorkshire as a bowler who could bat a little. Over his first few seasons, his batting improved at the expense of his bowling until he was regarded mainly as a specialist batsman. Around 1900, his bowling re-emerged when he discovered a method to make the ball swing in the air after he released it. He was one of the first bowlers to control the swing of the ball, which batsmen found very difficult to counter, making Hirst's bowling far more successful from then on.

From 1903 he achieved 11 consecutive doubles. He set records in 1905, when he scored 341 runs in an innings against Leicestershire—still the highest total for Yorkshire as of 2015—and in 1906, when he completed an unprecedented and unrepeated double of 2,000 runs and 200 wickets. In many seasons, he battled injury which reduced his effectiveness, but his bowling remained successful until shortly before the First World War. Hirst played in all England's home Test series between 1899 and 1909, but his record for England was less impressive than his record for Yorkshire, and he may have suffered from playing in Australia where conditions did not suit him.

Hirst returned to play for Yorkshire after the war, but became a cricket coach at Eton College in 1920, where he remained until 1938. After making occasional appearances in 1920 and 1921, he retired from regular first-class cricket. He maintained his connections with Yorkshire for the rest of his life, coached young players and established an excellent reputation for developing players of all social backgrounds. A popular player, coach, and personality with cricketers and spectators, Hirst died in 1954, aged 82.

== Early life ==
Hirst was born on 7 September 1871 in the Brown Cow Inn, Kirkheaton, a village close to Huddersfield. He was the last of 10 children born to James Hirst and his wife Sarah Maria Woolhouse. When his father died in 1880, Hirst lived with his sister Mary Elizabeth Woolhouse and her husband John Berry in Kirkheaton. (Note: Research by J. R. Ellam shows that Hirst was registered under the name of George Herbert Woolhouse, the son of Mary Elizabeth Woolhouse; his sister was baptised as Woolhouse, not Hirst, because her parents were unmarried at the time of her birth. Furthermore, the 1881 census names him as the son of Mary Elizabeth and John Berry.) After leaving school at 10 years of age, Hirst first worked for a hand-loom weaver in a local cottage, and then at a dyeing firm. He played rugby football as a full back during winter, and cricket with his friends and brothers in summer. By the age of 15, Hirst was playing regularly for the Kirkheaton cricket team and his batting and bowling performances regularly won prizes from a local newspaper. His reputation grew; when he was 18 he was a key player in the Kirkheaton team which won the Lumb Challenge Cup of 1889. In the final, watched by players from Yorkshire County Cricket Club, he took five wickets for 23 runs. Days later, invited to take part along with another local player, he appeared for Yorkshire against Cheshire in a non-first-class match in Huddersfield. He scored six runs in his only innings, and took three wickets in the match.

Hirst played only intermittently for Yorkshire over the next couple of seasons, but continued to develop as a cricketer, signing as a professional for Elland Cricket Club for the 1890 season before joining Mirfield in 1891. During that season, he made his first-class debut for Yorkshire against Somerset in the County Championship; he scored 15 runs and took two wickets in the game.

== First-class cricketer ==
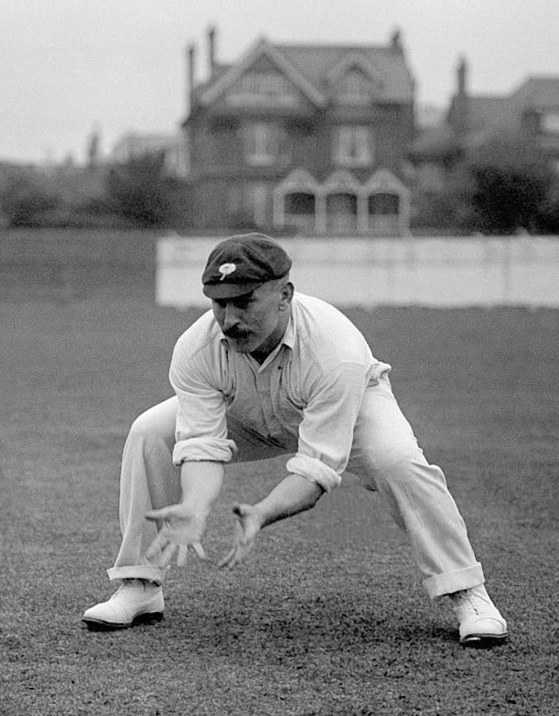
Hirst catching in a photograph taken by George Beldam c. 1906

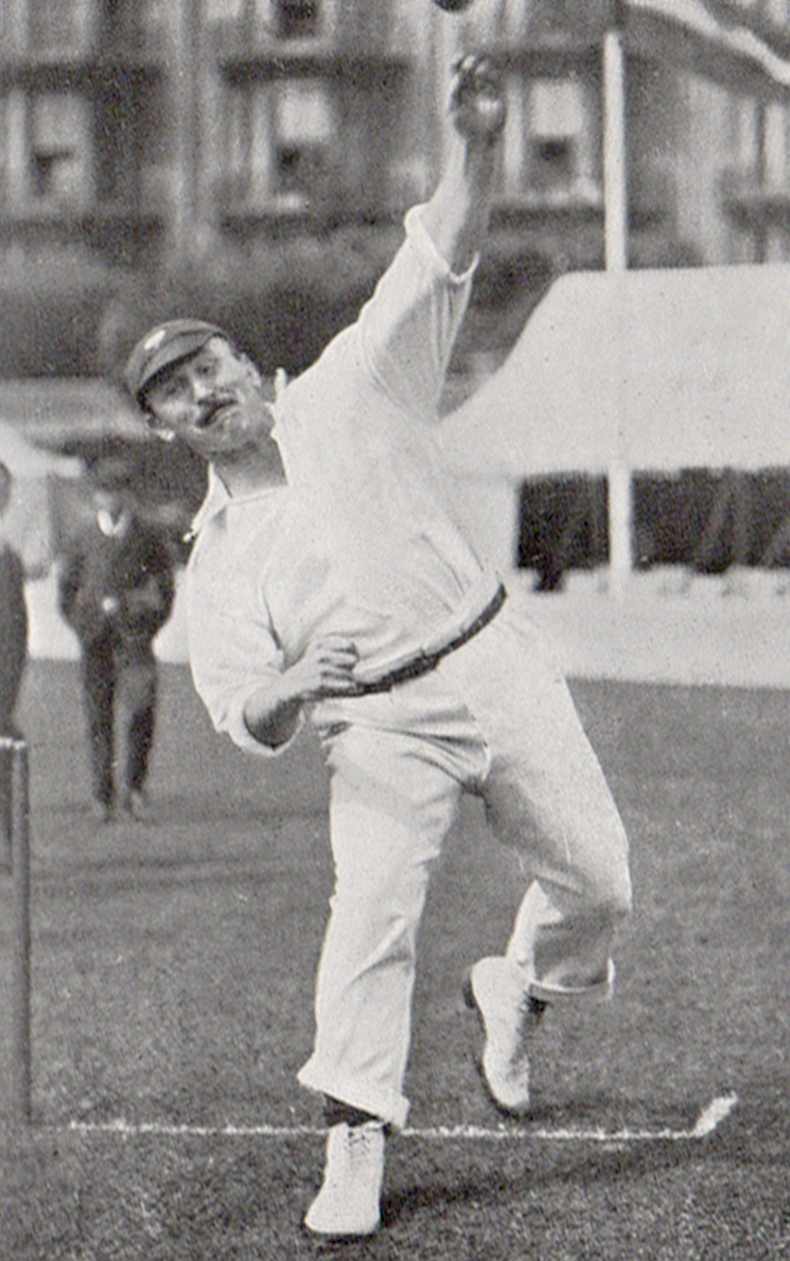
Hirst bowling in a photograph taken by George Beldam in 1906

=== First seasons for Yorkshire ===
For the 1892 season, Hirst joined Huddersfield, which played a higher standard of cricket. Yorkshire also gave him a longer run in the first team. Early in the season, Hirst appeared for Yorkshire against the Marylebone Cricket Club (MCC). Not considered a good batsman at this stage, he batted at number 11 in the first innings, scored 20 and 43 not out and, as a bowler, took four wickets for 29 runs (four for 29) and two for 58. His bowling performance particularly impressed Sydney Pardon, the editor of Wisden Cricketers' Almanack. Yorkshire, needing to fill a vacant place in the team, played Hirst 13 times in first-class matches in 1892. He did not pass 30 runs in an innings again and averaged 16.15 with the bat. With the ball, he took 30 wickets at an average of 20.56 with a best performance of six for 16 against Sussex. Wisden later noted that Hirst, until he tired later in the season and was dropped from the team, "bowled up to a certain point with excellent results".

Over the next few seasons, Hirst became a regular member of the Yorkshire side, but although his performances were good enough to keep him in the team, he had few outstanding successes. Wisden noted: "For some time after his first season Hirst's career was one of steady progress rather than of brilliant achievement." Hirst's batting remained undeveloped in 1893; he batted at number 10 and did not pass fifty in any one innings, though he managed some useful scores. He averaged only 15.04 with the bat, but his bowling continued to make a good impression on critics. He took 99 wickets at an average of 14.39, placing him third in the Yorkshire averages for the season; that year, the county won the official County Championship, which had begun in 1890, for the first time. In 1894, Hirst scored his maiden first-class century against Gloucestershire, hitting an unbeaten 115 out of a partnership of 176 for the ninth wicket. Although this was his only score over fifty, Wisden recorded how his batting often helped his team out of difficult situations. In total, he hit 564 runs at an average of 16.58. With the ball, his record was similar to the previous season. He took 98 wickets at an average of 15.98, and his best figures came in a match against Lancashire, a feat appreciated by Yorkshire supporters as the fixture (Note: In cricket, "fixture" means a scheduled match; in this context, it means a match between two teams which takes place each season.) was always highly competitive. Then in the 1895 season, Hirst passed 100 wickets in the season for the first time, securing 150 wickets at an average of 17.06. He established himself as an opening bowler for Yorkshire, assuming the role from Ted Wainwright and developing a good partnership with Bobby Peel. Against Leicestershire, he took a hat-trick. Although primarily regarded as a bowler, and while Wisden later described his batting as being in "temporary decline" in 1895, Hirst also scored 710 runs at an average of 19.18, with three fifties.

=== Leading all-rounder ===
In 1896, Yorkshire won their second County Championship. Hirst hit a century against Leicestershire and nine other scores over fifty; this improvement in his batting took him past 1,000 runs for the first time, and his average of 28.05 was substantially higher than he had achieved previously. With the ball he took 104 wickets, at the more expensive average of 21.61, to complete the double of 1,000 runs and 100 wickets for the first time. However, some critics in Yorkshire were unhappy that his batting had improved, believing that the extra effort involved would diminish his effectiveness as a bowler. They considered a powerful bowling attack to be vital to the team's success, more so than a strong batting line-up, and expressed the opinion that Hirst should concentrate on one discipline rather than dividing his energy. Over the next few seasons, these fears were proven to some extent, Wisden noting in 1901 that he was a less effective bowler than previously. In 1897, Hirst completed the double again. He scored 1,535 runs at an average of 35.69, with a century and 11 fifties, and took 101 wickets at an average of 23.22. These performances were good enough to earn him selection for the Players against the Gentlemen in the prestigious matches at The Oval and Lord's, in both of which he scored half-centuries.

For the winter of 1897–98, Hirst was selected as part of Andrew Stoddart's team to tour Australia. The team was outplayed and lost the Test matches 4–1, hampered by the poor form of the bowlers and ill health among the team, not least from Stoddart himself who missed several matches following the death of his mother. Hirst, suffering from a strained leg for some of the tour, was ineffective as a bowler. The hard Australian pitches favoured batsmen and did not suit Hirst's style of bowling. In all the first-class matches on the tour, he took only nine wickets at the very expensive average of 75.77. His batting was inconsistent and he scored 338 runs at an average of 21.12. His best scores came in minor matches. Nevertheless, he was selected for England in four of the five Test matches. His debut came in the first match, England's only victory, when he scored 62 batting at number six in the batting order. Despite bowling 41 overs in the game, he failed to take a wicket; his maiden Test match wicket came in the following Test, but he took only two wickets in the series. In the third Test, Hirst scored 85, which remained the highest Test score of his career, but in this series he reached double figures only once more. When the series ended, Hirst had scored 207 runs at an average of 29.57.

Hirst's poor form continued when he returned to England for the 1898 season. Fatigue from continuous cricket and ongoing problems with his leg added to his difficulties and he had a poor season. His only score over fifty was an innings of 130 against Surrey, and he scored 567 runs at an average of 17.71. Statistically, he had one of his worst bowling seasons, taking 36 wickets at 25.61 and never taking more than four wickets in an innings. For Yorkshire, Hirst's loss of form was offset by the debut of Wilfred Rhodes, also from Kirkheaton, who took 154 wickets in his first season. In 1899, Hirst showed a big improvement in his batting form, scoring 1,630 runs—his best tally to date—at an average of 35.43. He increased his number of wickets to 82 at 24.75, and his form was good enough to earn selection for his first home Test match, against Australia. However, it was only injuries to three other candidates that secured his place as a fast bowler, and he was not selected in the rest of the series. Wisden noted: "It cannot be said that the experiment was in any way a success. Hirst worked hard for his side, his fielding indeed being perfection, but as a bowler he did not cause the Australians any trouble." When he played the tourists in their game against Yorkshire soon after the Test, Hirst took 13 wickets. Later in the season, he played for the Players against the Gentlemen, though without any great success.

=== Discovery of "swerve" ===
Hirst's batting continued to be more successful than his bowling, to the point where commentators regarded him as primarily a batsman, who bowled occasionally. In 1900, he scored 1,960 runs at an average of 40.83, his best batting record to date, but his total of wickets fell to 62 at an average of 26.90, his worst average until 1914. His only representative cricket came in end-of-season festival matches, including a Gentlemen v Players match. Yorkshire won the County Championship, the first of three consecutive victories in which Hirst played a leading role. After his achievements in the season, Hirst was selected as one of Wisden's Cricketers of the Year. The citation described him as a confident batsman who could be relied upon in difficult batting conditions or when his team were under pressure, but noted how his bowling had suffered as he improved as a batsman. However, around this time, Hirst began to develop his use of swing bowling, known at the time as swerve bowling. Previously, the ball occasionally swung through the air without his deliberate intention after he released it, but he now discovered a method to control the "swerve" in certain atmospheric conditions. He never discussed how he achieved the effect, limiting his comments to "sometimes it works and sometimes it doesn't."

In the 1901 season, Hirst's improvement in bowling brought him the highest total of wickets in his career to date. In a summer of sunny weather which brought a succession of good batting pitches, he took 183 wickets, the first time since 1897 he had passed 100 wickets, at an average of 16.38. This placed him second in the national averages behind Rhodes. He recorded a series of impressive bowling performances, winning extravagant praise from Wisden; he took five wickets in an innings on 15 occasions and 10 wickets in a match five times, including once against traditional rivals Lancashire. His batting continued to be successful, and he completed his second double with 1,950 runs at 42.39, including his first double-century: 214 against Worcestershire. He was selected for the Gentlemen and Players match at Lord's, and appeared in the equivalent fixture in an end-of-season festival match.

== Test match regular ==
=== Success against Australia ===
From left to right: The Yorkshire team-mates Schofield Haigh, Hirst and Wilfred Rhodes at Marsden, 1905

Although both were invited, neither Hirst nor Rhodes toured Australia in the winter of 1901–02 with Archie MacLaren's team, as the Yorkshire committee wanted both players to be well rested before the new season. Hirst was statistically less successful in 1902, but he nevertheless returned to the Test team. The summer was very wet, resulting in many rain-affected pitches, known as sticky wickets, which favoured slower bowlers and made batting difficult. Hirst scored 1,413 runs in the season, at an average of 31.11 with two centuries. He took fewer wickets than the previous year, partly as he was often used for a few overs early in an innings by Yorkshire before giving way to slow bowlers Rhodes and Schofield Haigh, who topped the national first-class bowling averages for the season. In total, Hirst took 83 wickets at an average of 20.33.

During the summer of 1902, Australia toured England, playing five Test matches; Hirst made an impact on the series. Around the time of the first Test, the tourists endured a dispiriting spell of poor form and illness. In the first Test, England scored 376 for nine wickets. Hirst scored 48 and Wisden described his partnership with Johnny Tyldesley of 94 in 80 minutes as the turning point of the innings. In reply, Hirst and Rhodes bowled out Australia for 36 in conditions that the umpires considered reasonable to bat in. Wisden described the two Yorkshiremen as bowling very well. Hirst had figures of three for 15 and Rhodes returned seven for 17. However C. B. Fry, who played for England in the match, believed Hirst to be the more difficult to play and that while Rhodes bowled well, the Australian batsmen got themselves out as they "hurried to the other end and tried to hit Rhodes, without success. Well as Rhodes bowled, it was Hirst who was responsible for the debacle. This is the best instance I know of the bowler at the other end getting wickets for his colleague." England for this match was later described by some critics as the greatest England team in history. Rain prevented the match from being completed and saved Australia from almost certain defeat. The Australian team's next game was against Yorkshire. Hirst took four for 35 in the tourist's first innings, but in a low-scoring game, Yorkshire were behind after the first innings. After Australia had reached 20 for three wickets in their second innings, Hirst bowled Victor Trumper with what Hirst believed was the best delivery of his life and the tourists last wickets fell quickly. The team were bowled out for 23, of which Hirst took five wickets for nine runs as he made the ball swing. Yorkshire lost five wickets in scoring the 48 runs they required to win.

The second Test was badly affected by weather and Hirst did not bat or bowl, and in the third Test in Sheffield, lost by England, he scored eight runs and did not take any wickets. Although he failed at Sheffield, Hirst was the leading all-rounder in England and thus unlikely to be left out of the team. However, the England captain, Archie MacLaren, was engaged in a dispute with the team selectors over the composition of his side. He was given only 12 players to choose from for the fourth Test. Fred Tate was one of the twelve and the selectors probably included him as they believed MacLaren could not possibly choose him in the final eleven over another player and so would be forced to field the side they wanted. MacLaren responded by dropping Hirst to play Tate, out of anger towards the selectors. The pitch was soft, which would have favoured the bowling of Tate, but Wisden reported that while this offered some justification for dropping Hirst, "it meant playing a bowler pure and simple in preference to a first-rate all-round man, and the result proved anything but happy." Tate bowled just 16 overs in the game, dropped a vital catch and was the last man out as Australia won the match by three runs, giving them an unassailable lead in the series; later writers claimed that Tate's performance was responsible for losing the match.

Hirst was recalled for the final Test and played a vital role. Wisden said that he bowled as well as he had in 1901 as he brought about an early batting collapse. Although Australia recovered, he had figures of five for 77. With Len Braund, Hirst then helped England to avoid the follow-on, scoring 43 and according to Wisden "hitting with the utmost freedom". Hirst took a further wicket as Australia were dismissed for 121. England, needing 263 to win, were 48 for five at one point but an innings of 104 from Gilbert Jessop gave England a chance. Hirst scored 58 not out, making an aggressive start but slowing down to score mainly from singles in the later stages of the innings as wickets were lost. The ninth wicket fell with 15 needed when Rhodes joined Hirst. It has been claimed that Hirst said to Rhodes, "We'll get 'em in singles", but neither batsman could remember those words being said and not all the runs came in singles. The two Yorkshiremen held their nerve to take England to a one-wicket victory. Wisden described Hirst as playing "a great game", noted the coolness of his play under pressure and said that "Hirst's innings was in its way almost as remarkable as Jessop's".

In four Tests, Hirst scored 157 runs at an average of 39.25 and took nine wickets at an average of 23.11. Apart from his Test appearances, Hirst also played twice for the Players against the Gentlemen and played for the same side against the Australians.

=== Second tour of Australia ===
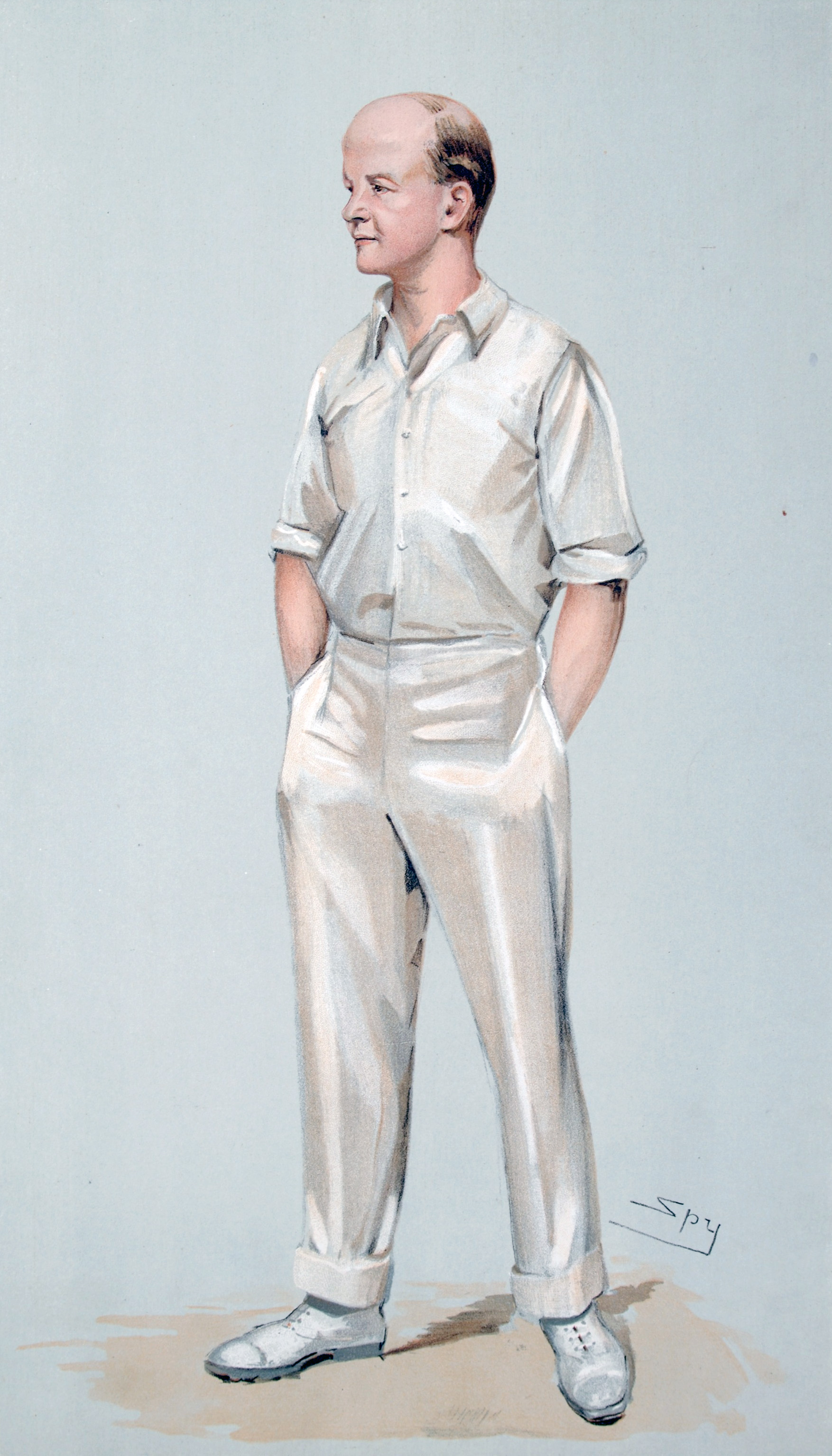
Pelham Warner, the captain of the first MCC tour of Australia

Early in the 1903 season, Hirst suffered a leg injury. This, coupled with other players' absences, was partly responsible for a poor start to the season by Yorkshire, and although the team recovered, it could achieve only third place in the County Championship. When Hirst returned his bowling speed was reduced, but during the season he rediscovered his swing bowling. In completing the first of 10 consecutive doubles, he took 128 wickets at an average of 14.94 and scored 1,844 runs at an average of 47.28. For Yorkshire, he topped both the batting and bowling averages and had the third highest batting average in the country. Hirst played in two end-of-season games for the Players against the Gentlemen; his 124 not out in the second match was his only century in the Players versus Gentlemen series.

In 1903, Pelham Warner, who played for Middlesex, was chosen to captain the first tour of Australia to be sponsored by MCC, in the winter of 1903–04. According to Warner, Hirst and Rhodes were the first two players to be selected, as "the two best bowlers of the present day in this country". Before the tour, critics claimed Hirst would be unsuccessful, citing his failure during his previous tour. However, Warner later wrote: "Hirst, to say nothing of his batting, bowled excellently throughout the tour, and was of much more value as a bowler than his average would suggest". He further described him as the best all-rounder in England and noted that "the tighter the match, the better he plays". Wisden was less convinced, and the report on the tour said that, as a bowler, "Hirst, though by no means the failure he had been with Mr Stoddart's team six years before, fell far below his English form." While commenting on his batting record, the Wisden report noted: "The Australian wickets [i.e. pitches] in fine weather are rather too fast to suit the pulling and hook strokes of which he is such a master in England." As he could not make the ball swing in Australia in the same way it did in England, Hirst used leg theory, bowling at leg stump with fielders close by on the leg side.

In his second match of the tour, Hirst scored 92 and used his pull shot more effectively than on other occasions. He followed this with 66 in the third match but did not take many wickets before the first Test. Warner considered he had nevertheless bowled well but was finding it difficult to maintain his energy in the hot conditions; his bowling lost pace and sting later in his bowling spells. Hirst played in all five Test matches, the first two of which were won by England. In the first game, Hirst took two wickets. In his first innings, he scored a duck and was dropped by Frank Laver before he had scored in the second. He survived to score 60 not out and his partnership with Tom Hayward guided England to victory after wickets had fallen early chasing a target of 194. Hirst scored 11 runs in the second match and took three wickets on a difficult batting pitch, badly affected by rain. Although this performance was not statistically impressive, Warner thought he bowled very well. During the third Test, Hirst took three wickets and, with innings of 58 and 44, was one of the few successful England batsmen in a poor performance which enabled Australia to win the match. England won the crucial fourth match to ensure the series victory. Hirst took two wickets and contributed scores of 25 and 18. Australia achieved a win in the final match in which Hirst scored 0 and 1, but after taking no wickets in the first innings he achieved his best Test figures of the tour in the second, with five for 48.

In the Test series, Hirst scored 217 runs at an average of 24.11 and took 15 wickets at an average of 30.06. He scored 569 runs at 33.47 and took 36 wickets at 24.50 over all first-class games on the tour. His best bowling performance was five for 37 against Tasmania. Warner described Hirst as a very consistent batsman throughout the tour, and noted that while he was a less effective bowler in Australian conditions than at home, he was often unlucky.

== Dominant in county cricket ==
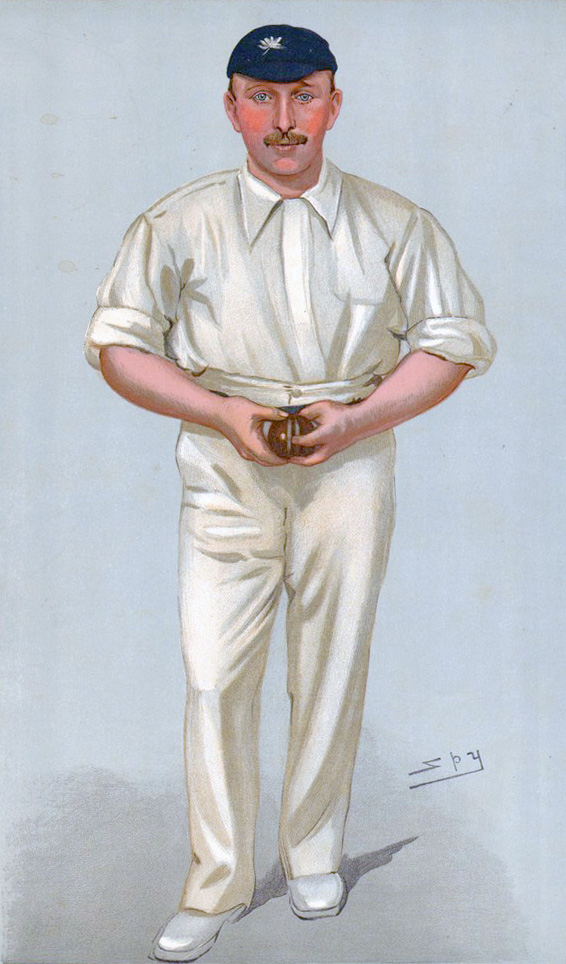
A caricature of Hirst by Leslie Ward ("Spy") published in January 1903: the caption reads "Yorkshire".

=== Affected by injury ===
After returning to England, Hirst completed another double in 1904. Although a leg injury reduced the pace and effectiveness of his bowling for much of the season, he scored 2,501 runs at an average of 54.36, the highest aggregate and average of his career, and took 132 wickets at 21.09. He became the first Yorkshire player to achieve the double of 2,000 runs and 100 wickets, a feat previously achieved only by the Gloucestershire trio of W. G. Grace, Charlie Townsend and Gilbert Jessop. Most of his eight centuries were either against the strongest counties or in adverse circumstances for the team. In August, Hirst had a benefit match against Lancashire from which he received £3,703, worth around £510,000 as of 2024, a very high sum for a benefit at the time, and his popularity was reflected in the attendance over three days of 78,792 spectators.

Yorkshire finished second to Lancashire in the County Championship in 1904 but regained the title in 1905. Hirst's leg-strain continued to cause him pain throughout the season and again hampered his bowling. Even so, he took 110 wickets at 19.94 and passed 2,000 runs for the second time, scoring 2,226 runs at an average of 53.95. Early in the season, Hirst scored 341 against Leicestershire, the highest score of his career and, as of 2015, the record individual innings by a Yorkshire batsman. On a good pitch for batting, he began his innings when Yorkshire had scored 22 for three wickets, in reply to Leicestershire's score of 419, batted just under seven hours and hit 53 fours and a six. Later that season, he scored another double century, hitting 232 not out against Surrey; only two other players reached double figures in the Yorkshire innings. In the same game, Hirst took five wickets for 43 runs.

Hirst's leg injury kept him out of the first two Test matches against Australia, although he would have been a certain selection had he been fit. He was chosen in the squad for the second match but was left out on fitness grounds. However, Hirst was not particularly successful in the three Tests he played that season, hitting a highest score of 40 not out; as a bowler he never took more than three wickets in an innings. In the series he scored 105 runs at an average of 35.00 and took 6 wickets at 35.33. England won the series 2–0, mainly due to the all-round efforts of Hirst's Yorkshire teammate Stanley Jackson, who headed the batting and bowling averages for the series.

=== Record breaking season and Tests against South Africa ===
In 1906, Hirst completed an unprecedented double of 2,000 runs and 200 wickets. Cricket writer A. A. Thomson noted that both milestones were unusual individually, and that such all-round achievements had only been matched in scope by those of W. G. Grace in the 1870s. No other cricketer has come close to matching this particular double. Hirst reached the 1,000 run–100 wicket double by the end of June, two weeks faster than anyone else in the history of first-class cricket. In total he scored 2,385 first-class runs at an average of 45.86 and took 208 wickets at 16.50. Hirst's contributions were particularly important in a close race for the County Championship. Kent were eventual champions after Yorkshire lost a close game to Gloucestershire, but Hirst performed well in the two matches against Kent. He scored a century and took 11 wickets as Yorkshire won the first, and took eight wickets and scored a match-saving 93 in the drawn second encounter. Against the other title contenders, Lancashire and Surrey, he was likewise successful with both bat and ball, earning praise from The Times and Wisden for his batting under difficult circumstances in these matches. His captain, Lord Hawke, said "It was not only what Georgie Hirst did but how he did it, coming off [i. e. "succeeding"] when an effort seemed most necessary and playing his best against the more formidable sides." He scored six centuries, two of which came in a record-equalling performance against Somerset. He scored 111 and 117 not out when batting and took six for 70 and five for 45 with the ball. He became only the second man after Bernard Bosanquet to score two centuries and take 10 wickets in the same first-class match; as of 2015, only one other man, Franklyn Stephenson in 1988, has achieved the feat. Battling a knee injury and exhaustion towards the end of the season, it became increasingly difficult for Hirst to perform. Hirst took his 200th wicket at the end of August and commented that, were his feat to be duplicated in future, "whoever does will be very tired". He also commented that his injuries only troubled him once the season was over and it "was a triumph of spirit over matter".

The weather was poor during the 1907 season, resulting in a succession of pitches which suited spin bowling and were difficult to bat on. In these circumstances, Hirst scored fewer runs than in the previous season. He did not score a century, making 1,321 runs at 28.71, and the prevalent type of pitches did not suit his bowling pace so that he took fewer wickets. Even so, he was the second highest wicket-taker in the season and came fifth in the bowling averages, with 183 wickets at 15.29. Hirst remained a first-choice member of the Test team, playing all three matches against South Africa that summer in a series which England won 1–0, with the other two games drawn. Although unsuccessful with the bat, achieving 46 runs in five innings with a top-score of 17, in a low-scoring second Test, Hirst was one of the few batsmen to handle the googlies of Aubrey Faulkner. As a bowler he took 10 wickets at 18.50; of these wickets, six were in the final match of the series. Yorkshire won the County Championship again during the 1908 season. Hirst completed another double, scoring 1,598 runs at 38.97 and taking 174 wickets at 14.05, but was not selected for any other representative games until the end of the season. However, he declined an invitation to tour Australia with the MCC team in 1907–08.

=== Final Tests ===
In the 1909 season, Hirst was less successful. Possibly affected by his heavy workload with bat and ball in previous seasons, his batting disappointed critics. He scored 1,256 runs at 27.30, his lowest batting average since 1898. With the ball, he took 115 wickets at 20.05; his best performances came in the more important matches such as those against Lancashire and Surrey. He was selected for the Players against the Gentlemen, taking seven wickets in the game. In the Test series against Australia, which England lost 2–1, Hirst played in the first four matches. England won the first game, in which Hirst took nine wickets. On the first day, bowling throughout the Australian innings with Colin Blythe, Hirst took four for 28. The Australians were never comfortable; Wisden noted that Hirst "[made] the ball swerve in his most puzzling fashion". After England established a first innings lead, Australia were bowled out for 151 in their second innings, with Hirst taking five for 58. The English opening batsmen scored the 105 runs required for victory without being separated. Hirst and Blythe took all the wickets which fell to England in the match, a rare accomplishment, and apart from a brief period, bowled throughout the match without resting. However, Hirst was ineffective in the rest of the series, and was left out of the side for the fifth and final Test. In the series he scored 52 runs at an average of 8.66, with a top-score of 31, and took 16 wickets at 21.75. This ended his Test career; his final Test record in 24 matches was 790 runs, with three scores over fifty, at an average of 22.57, and 59 wickets at an average of 30.00.

=== Last seasons before the First World War ===
Yorkshire had one of their worst seasons to date in 1910, finishing eighth in the County Championship and attracting disapproval from critics. Hirst led the Yorkshire batting and bowling averages and was the third highest wicket-taker in the country. He scored 1,840 runs at 32.85 and took 164 wickets at 14.79. One of his best performances came at Lord's, where he scored an unbeaten century to guide Yorkshire to a win against Middlesex. Against Lancashire he took nine for 23, the best bowling figures of his career, clean-bowling eight of his victims as Lancashire were dismissed for 61. Yorkshire continued to struggle in 1911, but Hirst was successful against many of the leading counties, mainly as a bowler. However, he achieved some large scores; against Sussex, he hit the third double-century of his career and against Lancashire he scored 156 as well as taking six wickets for 83. In total, he scored 1,789 runs at 33.12 and took 137 wickets at 20.40. In 1912 Yorkshire regained the County Championship; Hirst's form that season was not as good as in previous years, but he batted well before poor weather and a knee injury interrupted his cricket. He hit one century and his performances with the ball were unspectacular. In all he scored 1,133 runs at an average of 25.75 and took 118 wickets at 17.37. Although both Australia and South Africa toured England, Hirst did not play any Tests and, for the first time since 1904, was not selected for the Players side in any of their matches.

Hirst completed the 14th and final double of his career in 1913, leading the Yorkshire batting averages with 1,540 runs at an average of 35.81. His bowling was not as effective and he was no longer Yorkshire's main attacking bowler, as Alonzo Drake and Major Booth headed the averages. Hirst took 101 wickets at 20.13. During the following season, the last before the First World War, Hirst was further afflicted by injuries and missed some matches. He bowled far less frequently than in recent seasons and his 43 wickets, which cost 29.81, were his fewest since 1898; it was the first time since 1902 he failed to complete the double. His batting remained effective and he produced some good performances when his team were in difficult circumstances, although his two centuries were against the weaker bowling attacks of Northamptonshire and Somerset. He scored 1,670 runs at 41.75. In June, he was selected in a match to celebrate the hundredth anniversary of the current Lord's ground, playing for the Rest of England against MCC's team which had toured South Africa the previous winter. The outbreak of war brought the season to an early close in August.

== Later career ==
=== Final playing years ===
During the war Hirst, along with Rhodes and their team-mate Schofield Haigh, worked in a munitions factory in Huddersfield. Hirst and Rhodes were paid by Yorkshire to play in war-time cricket matches on a certain number of Saturdays. Hirst played in the Bradford League, and became known among cricketers for accepting minimal fees from financially struggling clubs. When first-class cricket restarted in 1919, Hirst resumed playing for Yorkshire. In the first match of the season he hit an aggressive unbeaten 180 against MCC, to secure a draw for the county; he followed this with two more centuries in the first two weeks of the season. Although his form later faltered, he played some substantial innings in difficult circumstances and ended the season with 1,441 runs at an average of 38.94. He bowled infrequently, taking 18 wickets at 29.27. During this season, Hirst accepted the position of coach at Eton College. In the last match of the season, at Scarborough, he was given a warm reception by the crowd, who did not expect to see him playing for Yorkshire again. However, he appeared on occasions during the school holidays in the next two seasons, although he did not score any centuries, did not average more than 24 with the bat and took only 21 wickets in total. At the end of the 1921 season Hirst retired as a Yorkshire player, and made what was expected to be his final first-class appearance in a Scarborough Festival match, in which he captained the Players against the Gentlemen. On the last day of the match, Hirst's 50th birthday, he took the final two wickets to secure victory for his side. The crowd gathered outside the pavilion and demanded to see him; he gave a farewell speech, and was moved by the reception given to him.

Hirst played three more first-class games; in 1921–22 he played two games for the Europeans cricket team in India, and in 1929, aged 58, he made a final appearance for Yorkshire in a Scarborough Festival match against the MCC. He scored just one run before Bill Bowes bowled him; Hirst reportedly commented: "A grand ball that, lad. I couldn't have played that one when I was good." In all first-class cricket, Hirst played 826 games, scored 36,356 runs at an average of 34.13 with 60 hundreds and took 2,742 wickets at 18.73.

Following his retirement as a player, Hirst occasionally umpired first-class matches, taking charge of at least one match at every Scarborough Festival between 1922 and 1938. He also umpired two matches on Yorkshire's tour of Jamaica in 1936, and a Minor Counties match between Yorkshire and Lancashire second teams.

=== Coaching career ===
From 1920 to 1938, Hirst was the cricket coach at Eton. The college's most important match was the annual match against Harrow at Lord's, and during Hirst's tenure, the team were unbeaten in the fixture, winning the six matches that produced a definite result and drawing the remainder. Following Hirst's retirement, Eton lost to Harrow in 1939 for the first time since the First World War. In the period of Hirst's coaching, Eton only lost once—in 1920—to Winchester. A combination of Hirst's technical knowledge, playing experience and empathy with young people made him a very successful coach. He taught technical proficiency, but encouraged his pupils to play their natural game. His Times obituary noted "his professional capacity earned him the respect of the boys and his natural good humour and good manners gained him the love of all." When he retired, a dinner was held in his honour at Eton.

While serving as the Eton coach, Hirst also worked with young Yorkshire players during the school holidays, and maintained his coaching connection with the county until shortly before his death. Despite the differences in the backgrounds of the players, Hirst was equally respected at Eton and when he acted as a coach to the Yorkshire team. At Yorkshire Hirst worked with young players in the cricket nets at Headingley, took charge of indoor trials during the winter, and travelled with the team as coach on a tour to Jamaica in 1936. Many Yorkshire players, with vastly differing temperaments, came under his influence and improved as players. One of Hirst's most notable achievements as a coach was improving the bowling of George Macaulay to the point where he became a key member of the Yorkshire team. The short terms at Eton allowed him to play matches for Scarborough from 1923 onwards, in July and August for seven seasons. During this period he scored 2,682 runs at an average of 58.3. His highest batting average was 117.2, attained in 1926 and his highest individual innings score was 124 in 1928, scored when he was 58 years old. He took 182 wickets in this time at a strike rate of 13.1. He also coached at the club in the summer months, alongside David Hunter.

Bill Bowes, who received coaching by Hirst and went on to play for England, described him as "the finest coach in the world". Len Hutton, another who was coached by Hirst, wrote "I shall always think of George Hirst as the ideal coach. He was a 'natural' one, the guide, the philosopher, and friend of every young fellow who has had a trial under him". Part of Hirst's success at Eton came from his personality and ability to extract the best from people. Bowes noted how his enthusiasm inspired young players, and his humour and kindness led boys to worship him. He could pass on technical knowledge in a way that was easy to comprehend, backed up with anecdotes to illustrate his point. Bowes described how "he had a rare skill in noting and demonstrating your faults and no less skill in illustrating the remedies".

== Style and technique ==
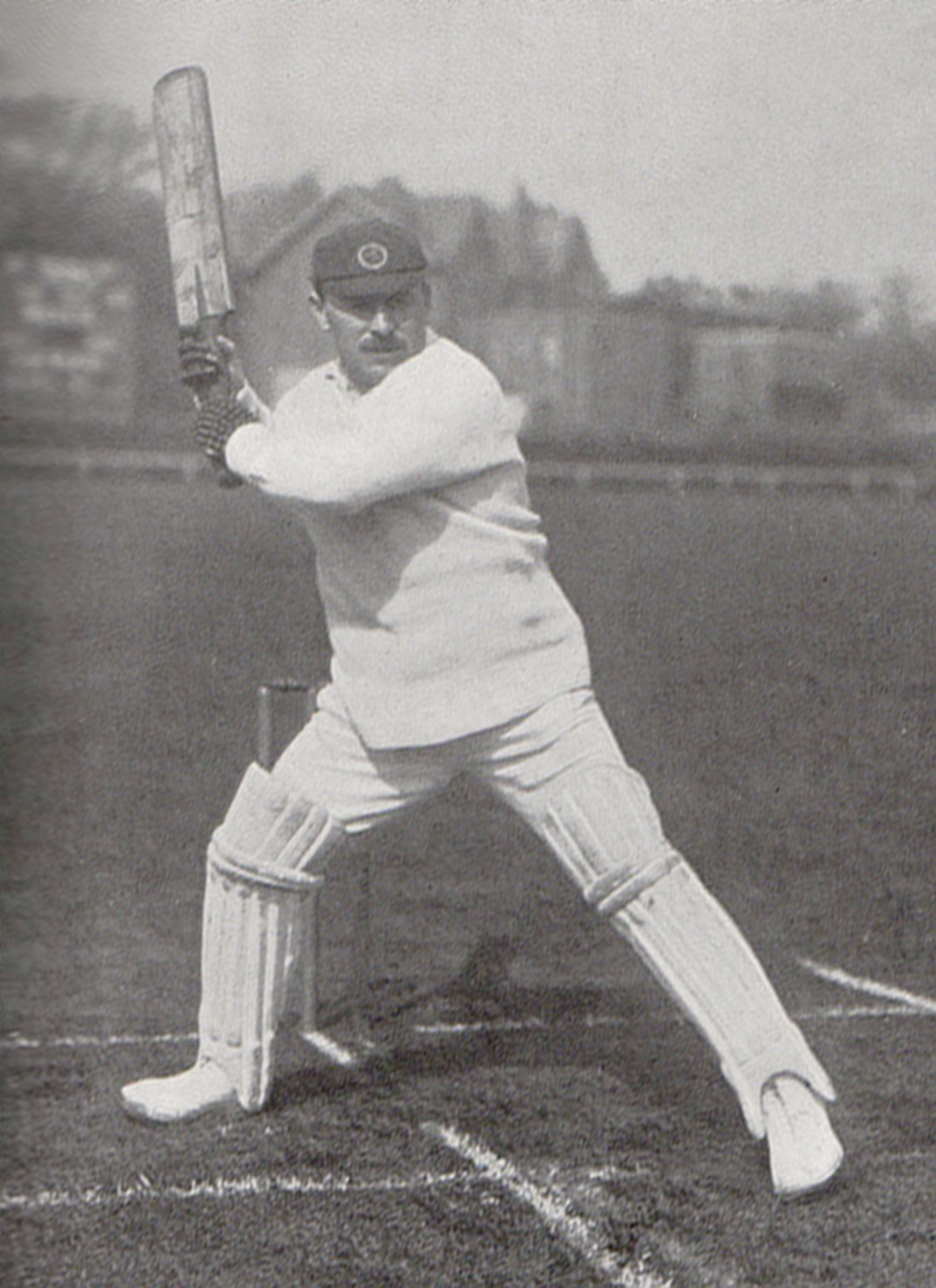
George Hirst getting into position to pull a short ball, photographed by George Beldam

Hirst received little coaching as a batsman. Physically brave, he was often at his best on pitches which were difficult for batting, and when his team faced a crisis. His usual approach was to bat aggressively. Although he could play defensively if required, he preferred to attack when his team were in difficulties. He played a variety of strokes, but he favoured the on drive and particularly the pull and hook shots. He was able to pull and hook almost any ball delivered to him, making it difficult to place fielders effectively while he was batting. Only in Australia did this approach prove less successful. He also established a reputation as an outstanding fielder at mid off. In this position, he took many catches, often from hard drives in an era when batsmen played this shot very well.

Although Hirst was a right-handed batsman, he bowled with his left arm at medium-fast pace. He was one of the first bowlers to make the ball swerve through the air in a controlled fashion. According to A. A. Thomson, Hirst's development of swing bowling was almost as revolutionary as Bernard Bosanquet's invention of the googly. His bowling partnership with Rhodes was particularly effective, and established a formidable reputation. Hirst could not make the ball swing in every match, nor could he maintain it through a long innings. However, when he could achieve swerve, even the best batsmen found it almost impossible to bat against him. His success was dependent on atmospheric conditions; for example, he could not swing the ball much in Australia. He was particularly effective when bowling into the wind. Sammy Woods described facing Hirst when the ball was moving in the air: "How the devil can you play a ball that comes in at you like a hard throw-in from cover-point?"

Hirst was not an especially quick bowler, a little faster than medium pace, with a long run-up and a relaxed action. He usually bowled over the wicket, meaning he bowled from the right hand side of the wickets and therefore angled the ball across the pitch. After delivery, the ball swung through the air at the last minute and hurried through after pitching, appearing to get faster. A very accurate bowler, he was difficult to score against unless a batsman was prepared to hit him in the air over mid on. The main dangers to the batsmen were the risk of being bowled or hitting the ball with a defensive shot and being caught by specially-placed fielders on the leg side. His ability to make the ball swing made him effective on a variety of pitches. Before Hirst developed his technique, bowlers often rubbed the ball in the dirt to remove the shiny layer of the ball, unaware that this layer helped the ball to swing. Hirst's Wisden obituary records: "Hirst, in fact, has been described as the father of all modern seam and swing bowling."

Hirst completed the double 14 times, more than any other cricketer except Rhodes. Unusually for an all-rounder, for much of his career he was equally successful as a batsman and as a bowler. Consequently, he was a key member of the Yorkshire team. His Yorkshire captain Lord Hawke described Hirst as "the greatest county cricketer of all time", and journalist Jim Kilburn noted that no cricketer could "capture the heart and the imagination and the affections more firmly than George Herbert Hirst". E. W. Swanton described his typical style of play as "grafting for victory without heroics". His record as a Test cricketer was less impressive than his figures in county cricket, owing to some extent to playing conditions during his two tours of Australia which reduced the effectiveness of his bowling and batting.

Hirst gave the impression of enjoying every game he played, and many of the captains under whom he played praised both his personality and his contribution to the team. Lord Hawke said that Hirst's smile "went right round his head and met at the back". Warner noted his wit helped the team in difficult situations during the tour of Australia in 1903–04. Hirst's Times obituary said: "No why or wherefore, no explanation of his great ability, not even his record which adorns the pages of Wisden can adequately describe to those who had not the fortune to see him play the rich quality of George Hirst, the type of professional cricketer to which all would like to aspire. He played during the golden age of cricket, and he was one of the most illustrious of his time." Hirst was noted for his honesty, sportsmanship, and enthusiasm. Known as "George Herbert", he was admired and affectionately regarded by his contemporaries and by spectators. The public worshipped him in a way never replicated for his contemporary and fellow Kirkheaton-born all-rounder Wilfred Rhodes, a much more dour character. The two men were never good friends; there may have been a degree of jealousy between them, and Rhodes did not appreciate Hirst's jovial attitude. Rhodes was more tactically astute than Hirst, but Hirst's enthusiasm and personality were more inspirational to the team. Rhodes, when asked about Hirst's ability to swing the ball, replied: "He was very good. But he didn't know how to use it, you know. I had to set the field for him so that he got the best out of it."

A plain-speaking man, Hirst could be firm and even outspoken at times. Wisden said: "Cricket was George Hirst's life". Bowes wrote that Hirst "was loved as a player, he was worshipped as a coach, revered as a man. His friends numbered thousands. He gave his full life to cricket; cricket gave a full life to him." Bowes also commented: "I never hope to meet a better coach or a better man."

== Personal life ==
On 1 January 1896, Hirst married Emma Kilner in Kirkheaton; James, their first child, was born on 6 October of the same year. A second child, Annie, followed in December 1899, and a third, Molly, in April 1906. The family first lived in Kirkheaton but later moved to Marsh, a more affluent area of Huddersfield. In his later years, Hirst's health declined and he spent time in a nursing home. His wife died in 1953; twelve months later, on 10 May 1954, Hirst died, aged 82. He was cremated at Lawnswood Crematorium, Leeds.

== Bibliography ==
- Bowes, Bill (1949). Express Deliveries. London: Stanley Paul. OCLC 643924774.
- Ellam, J. R. (2004). Huddersfield's Nineteenth-Century Yorkshire XI. Twickenham: Athena Press. ISBN 1-84401-302-2.
- Frith, David (2002). Bodyline Autopsy. The full story of the most sensational Test cricket series: Australia v England 1932–33. London: Aurum Press. ISBN 1-85410-896-4.
- Hodgson, Derek (1989). The Official History of Yorkshire County Cricket Club. Ramsbury, Marlborough, Wiltshire: The Crowood Press. ISBN 1-85223-274-9.
- Hutton, Len (1948). Cricket is my Life. London: Hutchinson & Co. OCLC 220911278.
- Swanton, E. W. (1999). Cricketers of My Time. London: André Deutsch. ISBN 0-233-99746-6.
- Thomson, A. A. (1960). Hirst and Rhodes. London: The Sportsmans Book Club. OCLC 644028572.
- Warner, P. F. (2003) [1904]. How we Recovered the Ashes. An Account of the 1903–04 MCC Tour of Australia. London: Methuen. ISBN 0-413-77399-X.
- Woodhouse, Anthony (1989). The History of Yorkshire County Cricket Club. London: Christopher Helm. ISBN 0-7470-3408-7.
