= Ben Wilson (English cricketer) =

English cricketer

Personal information
- Full name: Ben Ambler Wilson
- Born: 22 September 1921; Knaresborough, Yorkshire, England
- Died: September 1993 (aged 71–72); Whitby, Yorkshire, England
- Batting: Left-handed
- Bowling: Slow left-arm orthodox
- Relatives: Benjamin Wilson (father)

Domestic team information
- Years: Team
- 1955–1959: Suffolk
- 1951: Warwickshire

Career statistics
Competition	First-class
Matches	1
Runs scored	0
Batting average	0.00
100s/50s	–/–
Top score	0
Balls bowled	120
Wickets	1
Bowling average	75.00
5 wickets in innings	–
10 wickets in match	–
Best bowling	1/75
Catches/stumpings	–/–
- Source: Cricinfo, 28 December 2011

Ben Ambler Wilson (22 September 1921 – September 1993) was an English cricketer. Wilson was a left-handed batsman who bowled slow left-arm orthodox. He was born at Knaresborough, Yorkshire.

Wilson made a single first-class appearance for Warwickshire against Scotland at Edgbaston in 1951. Scotland made 359 in their first-innings, with Wilson taking the wicket of William Edward with figures of 1/75 from twenty overs. In response Warwickshire made 332 all out, with Wilson being dismissed for a duck by Samuel Thomson. The match ended in a draw. This was his only major appearance for Warwickshire.

He later played for Suffolk in the Minor Counties Championship, making his debut for the county in 1955 against the Essex Second XI. He played Minor counties cricket for Suffolk from 1955 to 1959, making sixteen appearances. He died at Whitby, Yorkshire in September 1993. His father, Benjamin Wilson, played first-class cricket for Yorkshire.
