= Ben Wilson (kitesurfer) =

Australian kitesurfer

Ben Wilson is an Australian kitesurfer notable for holding the record for kitesurfing the largest wave ever captured on film; In 2011, Ben successfully kited Fiji’s most infamous wave, Cloudbreak at 35-foot. There have been many attempts by the next generation of kitesurfers including Nicolo Porcella and Jesse Richman to best this feat but as yet there has been no successful attempt.

Prior to his wave at Cloudbreak, Ben was part of the early kitesurfing movement in Australia, winning Australia’s inaugural National Titles along with multiple competitions including the Merimbula Classic and Schick Kitesurfing Series. During the same period (2003–2005), he placed 3rd in the Gorge Games held in Hood River, Oregon. Off the back of these outstanding competitive results he was signed to Slingshot and shortly after turned his focus from competition to creating video content.

Ben spent over 10 years as a team rider for Slingshot, during which time he traveled the world and created feature-length documentaries such as The Dirty South and Shades of Green. He was featured in Surfers Journal in their article The Might of the Kite and continued to push kitesurfing towards a mainstream surf market through his Jeep Kite School initiative and coaching trips.

Wilson’s first experience kitesurfing came in 2000 while working on Namotu Island, in Fiji. Windsurfing pros Robby Naish, Pete Cabrinha, Dave Kalama & Brett Lickle spent the Hawaiian off-season there testing and developing their own equipment for this new sport. At the time the sport’s focus was on twin-tip/freestyle so when Ben and several others including Jeff Tobias & Mauricio Abreu began using their surfboards in the waves it propelled kiteboarding into a new direction. From there the wave riding movement gained traction and in 2009 Wilson launched his own surf-focused kite brand, BenWilsonSurf (now BWSURF).

Ben directs his company from the Sunshine Coast, Australia where he lives with his wife and two children.
