= Ben Wilson (American artist) =

American artist (1913–2001)

- Born: June 23, 1913; Philadelphia, Pennsylvania, US
- Died: November 9, 2001 (aged 88)
- Education: City College (CCNY) 1935;
- Occupations: Abstract expressionism; constructivism; artist; painter
- Spouse: Evelyn Perlman
- Website: benwilsonamericanartist.org

Ben Wilson (June 23, 1913 – November 9, 2001) was an American artist known for his early, expressionistic paintings from the mid-1930s to the mid-1950s and his subsequent non-objective paintings, a personal synthesis of abstract expressionism and constructivism. He is generally considered a second-generation abstract expressionist.

== Early years and education ==
Ben Wilson was born in Philadelphia to Jewish parents who had emigrated from the Ukrainian city of Kyiv. When he was three, the family settled in New York City, where Wilson attended public schools and graduated in 1935 from City College (CCNY); there he studied with Abram Gustav Schulman and did honors with George William Eggers. To gain exposure to a wider range of styles, he also studied at the National Academy Museum and School with George Lawrence Nelson, Carl Anderson, Leon Kroll and Gordon Samstag, and at the Educational Alliance with Abbo Ostrowsky.

== Artwork ==
In spite of his predominately academic training, Wilson was particularly attracted to Analytic Cubism and experimented with elements of abstraction even in his earliest figurative work. Following his formal art education, he shared a studio in Chelsea with several of his CCNY classmates and worked for the WPA (Works Progress Administration) as an art instructor. By the late 1930s through the 40s an expressionistic style and social content dominated his painting. Strongly identifying with the plight of the persecuted in Europe, Wilson explored themes of war, torment, and futility, attempting to convey "the grief of the intolerable."

One of the youngest artists to show at the A.C.A. Gallery in 1940 and with the Bombshell Group at the Riverside Museum in 1942, he had his first one-man show in 1946 at the Gallery Neuf. His work—expressionistically rendered Biblical parables more closely akin to the German expressionists than to the prevailing social realists—was much admired by the critics for its sincerity and vehement social protest. Art critic Howard Devree wrote in The New York Times (Nov. 17, 1946), "If there has been more earnest and emotional painting shown this season than the somber canvases by Ben Wilson at Galerie Neuf, it has escaped my attention."

When times improved and social pressures subsided, Wilson's mood lifted. Along with his sculptor wife Evelyn Wilson and daughter Joanne, he spent 1950–52 in Paris, where he worked at the Academie Julien. During this time his involvement with imagery persisted. While he remained concerned with his sense of universal injustice, his work took a turn towards the psychological and mythic.

By 1960, influenced by the Russian constructivists, Mondrian, and Abstract Expressionism, Wilson had fully embraced abstraction. Searching for what he called "a scaffolding under the externals", he struggled to develop his unique personal vocabulary and structure, a fusion of the cerebral and the emotive. In time he became increasingly experimental, incorporating unorthodox materials; working his paintings from all directions; and dripping, spraying, stenciling and collaging. While continuing to explore unusual color harmonics, compositional variations increasingly became his major focus. Employing disjunctions, repeated and interlocking motifs, linear networks, and complex overlays, he worked to create a sense of transparency through a multilayered development of space. Through the years Wilson pursued similar investigations in notebook after notebook of drawings.

A dedicated teacher, for five decades Wilson taught painting in his various studios in Manhattan and later New Jersey, and lectured to museum- and gallery-visiting classes for Brandeis University and NYU. He was also active in artist groups such as MAG (Modern Artists Guild). and Vectors. Widely exhibited, with more than 30 solo exhibitions, Wilson is cited in Who's Who in Art, Who's Who in the East, the Dictionary of International Biography and American Artists of Renown. As well as in private collections, his work is represented in numerous museum and university collections. Montclair State University, in Montclair, New Jersey, permanently houses his art estate and papers. A portion of his papers is also included in the Smithsonian Archives of American Art
