= William Edward =

Scottish cricketer (1916–2005)

Cricket information
- Batting: Right-handed
- Bowling: Right-arm medium

Career statistics
Competition	First-class
Matches	28
Runs scored	898
Batting average	23.63
100s/50s	0/6
Top score	99
Balls bowled	4,128
Wickets	38
Bowling average	38.81
5 wickets in innings	0
10 wickets in match	0
Best bowling	4/51
Catches/stumpings	10/–
- Source: ESPNCricinfo, 20 June 2021

William Alfred Edward (19 June 1916 – October 2005) was a Scottish cricketer.

Edward was an allrounder and played his club cricket with Clydesdale, scoring 3,284 runs and taking 343 wickets. He represented Scotland in first-class cricket with a highest of 99 runs against Ireland in 1950.
