= Benjamin Wilson (New Zealand cricketer) =

New Zealand cricketer (1870–1929)

Personal information
- Full name: Benjamin Marcus Wilson
- Born: 11 November 1870; Thames, New Zealand
- Died: 22 September 1929 (aged 58); Lower Hutt, Wellington, New Zealand

Domestic team information
- Years: Team
- 1892/93: Wellington
- Source: Cricinfo, 27 October 2020

Benjamin Marcus Wilson (11 November 1870 – 22 September 1929) was a New Zealand government administrator and cricketer. He played in one first-class match for Wellington during the 1892–93 season.

Born at Thames in 1870, Wilson's father was a printer for the New Zealand government in Wellington. One of four children, he won a scholarship to Wellington College. Described as taking "a great interest in cricket" and as "a good all-round player", his only first-class cricket match was a November 1892 fixture against Hawke's Bay. Batting last in the Wellington order, he made scores of one and one not out in his two innings, and did not bowl. He was a member of Wellington Cricket Club.

After leaving school, Wilson worked as a legal clerk for five years before entering the civil service. He worked in a variety of roles, including as private secretary within the offices of Native Affairs, Mines, Railways, and of the Postmaster-General, before becoming the first registrar of the Court of Arbitration in 1907. In 1910 he was promoted to be the general manager of the Department of Tourist and Health Resorts.

Wilson married Anna 'Dot' Parsons, a member of a well-known Wellington family, at St Paul's Cathedral in Wellington in January 1897. The couple had one son who farmed on the North Island. Wilson died at his home at Lower Hutt after contracting pneumonia in 1929 at the age of 58.
