= Ernest Smith (cricketer, born 1888) =

English cricketer

Ernest Smith (11 July 1888 – 2 January 1972) was an English first-class cricketer, who played sixteen matches for Yorkshire County Cricket Club from 1914 to 1926. He also played for Colne C.C. (1921–1924) and Rawtenstall C.C. (1925) in the Lancashire League, and for the Yorkshire Second XI (1912–1920) and the Yorkshire Council (1920).

Born in Barnsley, Yorkshire, England, Smith was a right-handed batsman, who scored 169 runs at 10.56, with a best of 49 against Essex. A slow left arm and left arm medium pace bowler, he took 46 wickets at 23.69, with a best analysis of 6 for 40 against Leicestershire. He also took five wickets in an innings against the Marylebone Cricket Club (MCC).

Smith died in January 1972, in Blackburn, Lancashire.
