= Morice Clarke =

English cricketer

Morice Carlos Clarke (23 February 1852 – 14 July 1887) was an English first-class cricketer active from 1875 to 1880 who played for Surrey. He was born in Welton, Northamptonshire, and died in Virginia Water.
