= Benny Wilson =

English first-class cricketer (1879–1957)

Personal information
- Full name: Benjamin Birdsall Wilson
- Born: 11 December 1879; Scarborough, Yorkshire, England
- Died: 14 September 1957 (aged 77); Harrogate, Yorkshire, England
- Batting: Right-handed
- Bowling: Right-arm fast-medium
- Role: Batsman
- Relatives: B. A. Wilson (son)

Domestic team information
- Years: Team
- 1906–1914: Yorkshire

Career statistics
Competition	First-class
Matches	185
Runs scored	8,053
Batting average	27.20
100s/50s	15/35
Top score	208
Balls bowled	185
Wickets	2
Bowling average	139.00
5 wickets in innings	0
10 wickets in match	0
Best bowling	1/16
Catches/stumpings	53/–
- Source: ESPNcricinfo, 24 April 2017

Benjamin Birdsall Wilson (11 December 1879 – 14 September 1957) was an English first-class cricketer, who played 185 games for Yorkshire County Cricket Club between 1906 and 1914. Known as "Benny", he was born in Scarborough, Yorkshire. He was a right-handed batsman who scored 8,053 first-class runs at 27.20, with a highest score of 208, one of four centuries he made against Sussex. He accumulated a total of fourteen centuries along with 35 fifties in his career, complemented by 53 catches in the field. Additionally, he achieved two first-class wickets at an average of 139.00 each. He also played for the Yorkshire Second XI from 1902 to 1911, and for H. Hayley's XI in 1906.

== Playing career ==
Wilson played his early cricket in Scarborough before joining Yorkshire, for whom he was a prolific scoring batsman from 1906 to 1914, though he scored slowly at times and was slow in the field. He possessed a strong defense and could hit hard without any pretense to style. After a modest start, he scored 109 at Headingley against Derbyshire in his only innings of the 1908 season, and his extended trial in 1909 saw him finish fourth in Yorkshire's batting averages with a four-figure aggregate. He maintained his place as Yorkshire's opening batsman until the beginning of World War I in 1914, but left the county when hostilities ceased in 1919.

== Coaching career ==
Wilson became a coach and was with Pudsey Britannia Cricket Club until taking a position at Harrow School in 1921. He was at Harrow for eleven years and later coached at St Peter's School in York. In the late 1930s, he was in charge of coaching for Yorkshire at Headingley and one of his charges was the teenage Jim Laker, who was then a promising batsman and fast bowler. Wilson taught Laker how to spin the ball and Laker developed this ability into a skill while he served in the Army during World War II. After the war, Wilson coached in New Zealand for a time and later at Harrogate Cricket Club when he was over 70 years old.

== Personal details ==
Wilson died in September 1957 in Harrogate, Yorkshire. His son, Ben Wilson, played one match for Warwickshire.
