= Dick Pilling =

English cricketer (1855–1891)

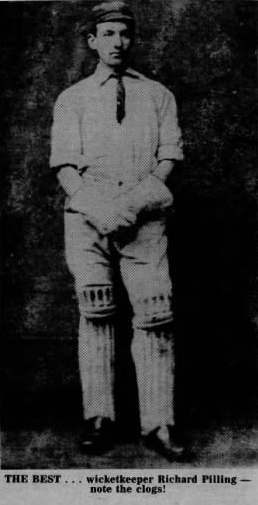
- Pilling in 1890

Personal information
- Born: 11 August 1855; Old Warden, Bedfordshire, England
- Died: 28 March 1891 (aged 35); Manchester, Lancashire, England
- Batting: Right-handed
- Role: Wicket-keeper

International information
- National side: England
- Test debut (cap 33): 31 December 1881 v Australia
- Last Test: 31 August 1888 v Australia

Career statistics
Competition	Test	First-class
Matches	8	250
Runs scored	91	3,572
Batting average	7.58	9.85
100s/50s	0/0	0/2
Top score	23	78
Catches/stumpings	10/4	459/208
- Source: CricInfo, 16 May 2024

Richard Pilling (11 August 1855 – 28 March 1891) was an English professional cricketer who played eight Test matches for the England cricket team. In first-class cricket he represented Lancashire County Cricket Club.

Pilling was born on 11 August 1855, at Old Warden. He died on 28 March 1891, aged 35, from tuberculosis. He was commonly called Dick Pilling.

Pilling was a wicket-keeper who played 8 times for the England cricket team. He was one of the Wisden Cricketers of the Year in 1891.
