= Louis Hall =

English cricketer

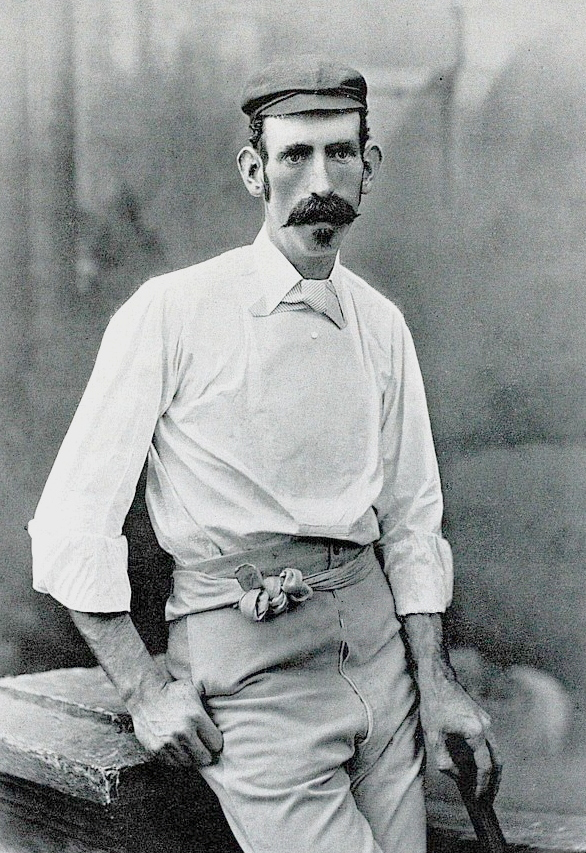
- Hall in about 1895

Personal information
- Born: 1 November 1852; Batley, Yorkshire, England
- Died: 19 November 1915 (aged 63); Morecambe, Lancashire, England
- Batting: Right-handed
- Bowling: Right-arm slow

Career statistics
Competition	First-class
Matches	315
Runs scored	11,095
Batting average	23.06
100s/50s	12/42
Top score	160
Balls bowled	1,839
Wickets	22
Bowling average	42.13
5 wickets in innings	0
10 wickets in match	0
Best bowling	4/51
Catches/stumpings	197/0
- Source: Cricinfo, 28 February 2022

Louis Hall (1 November 1852 – 19 November 1915) was an English first-class cricketer who played for Yorkshire from 1873 to 1892.

== Life and career ==
Born in Batley, Yorkshire, Hall made his first-class debut in 1873, when he played a few matches for Yorkshire with little success. He established his reputation with an innings of 79 for a local Eighteen against the Australian XI in 1878. Thereafter, until 1892, he was a mainstay of Yorkshire.

With George Ulyett, Hall formed a successful opening partnership for Yorkshire. They had eleven opening stands of over 100 and, against Sussex in 1885, they added 128 and 108 in the two innings. Against Middlesex in 1884, Hall scored 96 and 135. His finest season was 1887, when he scored 1,544 at an average of 41, 1,240 of them in first-class matches. His highest score was 160 against Lancashire in 1887, when he also took seven wickets.

Hall carried his bat seventeen times in first-class cricket, a feat matched only by W. G. Grace and Cecil Wood. He played for the Players against Gentlemen five times, and captained Yorkshire a few times in the absence of the regular captain Lord Hawke. Defensive by nature, Hall was not an attractive batsman, his primary shot being the front-foot defence. He once saved a match against Kent by batting two and three-quarter hours for 12 runs.

He was awarded a benefit match against Surrey in 1890, but he deferred it so that the injured Billy Bates could have his that year. Hall's benefit match, against Surrey at Sheffield in 1891, earned him 570 pounds. After his active career ended in 1894, he served as a coach at Uppingham School.

A steward and member of Hick Lane Wesleyan Chapel, he was also a lay preacher in the Batley area, as well being a Liberal councillor for nine years. He also helped his fellow cricketers as Chairman of the Yorkshire Cricketers Benevolent Fund. In addition, he was secretary of Batley Rugby Club, at the time of the change over to the Northern Union.

Hall died in Morecambe, Lancashire, in November 1915.
