= Arthur Wood (cricketer, born 1898) =

English cricketer

Personal information
- Born: 25 August 1898; Fagley, Bradford, Yorkshire, England
- Died: 1 April 1973 (aged 74); Middleton, Ilkley, Yorkshire, England
- Batting: Right-handed

International information
- National side: England
- Test debut: 20 August 1938 v Australia
- Last Test: 19 August 1939 v West Indies

Career statistics
Competition	Test	First-class
Matches	4	420
Runs scored	80	8,842
Batting average	20.00	21.20
100s/50s	0/1	1/43
Top score	53	123*
Balls bowled	–	30
Wickets	–	1
Bowling average	–	33.00
5 wickets in innings	–	0
10 wickets in match	–	0
Best bowling	–	1/33
Catches/stumpings	10/1	631/255
- Source: CricInfo, 15 July 2011

Arthur Wood (25 August 1898 – 1 April 1973) was a Yorkshire and England cricketer, who played as the wicket-keeper in four Tests from 1938 to 1939.

== Life and career ==
Wood was born in Fagley, Bradford, Yorkshire, England. He appeared in 420 first-class matches from 1927 to 1949. A right-hander, he scored 8,842 runs, averaging 21.20, with one century and 43 fifties, and made 886 dismissals, including 255 stumpings. He was awarded his Yorkshire cap in 1929, and made the wicket-keeping position at Yorkshire his own through the 1930s, including making 225 consecutive appearances. His most successful season with the bat was in 1935, when he scored his only century (123 not out against Worcestershire); in this season he passed 1,000 runs for the only time, the first Yorkshire wicket-keeper to do so.

In 1938, Wood made his Test debut against Australia, just days before his 40th birthday. A late selection, he travelled from Leeds to London by taxi. On arrival in London the taxi driver asked him for the fare of £7 15s, Wood is believed to have informed him that he was only paying for the ride, not buying the taxi. He, however, contributed 53 in 92 minutes off 95 balls, to England's then world record total of 903–7 declared. Joining Joe Hardstaff with The Oval scoreboard reading 770–6 when Len Hutton was dismissed for 364, he famously quipped "I was always the man for a crisis" before sharing a stand of 106 for the seventh wicket.

In 1939, Wood was selected as one of the five Wisden Cricketers of the Year; also in this year came his other three Test matches, which were against the West Indies, and were the last Tests before World War II.

His benefit match was the Yorkshire versus Middlesex match, played at Park Avenue, Bradford, on 8–11 July 1939. Wood made 408 first-class appearances for Yorkshire.

== Death ==
Wood died in Middleton, Ilkley, Yorkshire in 1973, aged 74.
