= Jimmy Binks =

English cricketer

Personal information
- Full name: James George Binks
- Born: 5 October 1935 (age 91); Hull, Yorkshire, England
- Batting: Right-handed
- Bowling: Right-arm leg-break
- Role: Wicketkeeper

International information
- National side: England
- Test debut (cap 419): 21 January 1964 v India
- Last Test: 3 February 1964 v India

Domestic team information
- Years: Team
- 1955–1969: Yorkshire

Career statistics
Competition	Test	FC	LA
Matches	2	502	30
Runs scored	91	6,910	247
Batting average	22.75	14.73	13.72
100s/50s	0/1	0/18	0/0
Top score	55	95	34
Catches/stumpings	8/–	895/176	26/8
- Source: CricketArchive, 18 November 2024

James Graham Binks (born 5 October 1935) is a former English cricketer who played as a wicket-keeper for Yorkshire. Although he was regarded by many as the best wicket-keeper of his generation, his limited batting ability restricted him to just two Test match appearances for England, both on the 1963-64 tour to India. Ironically, because of injuries to other players, he opened the batting in three of his four Test innings.

== Life and career ==
Binks' County Championship career is unique. Coming into the Yorkshire team in June 1955, he then played in every single Championship game played by Yorkshire until he retired at the end of the 1969 season. Yorkshire won the Championship seven times in this period and the Gillette Cup twice.

Binks stands 19th on the all-time list of wicketkeepers with 1,071 first-class dismissals. He holds the record for the most catches in an English season with 96 in 1960. With 11 stumpings in that season, he is one of only seven wicket-keepers to achieve more than 100 dismissals in an English season.

With regard to Binks' short international career, the cricket commentator, Colin Bateman, stated, "Binks... oddly failed to reproduce the elegant assurance he brought to his work with Yorkshire. It may have had something to do with the fact that he was also asked to act as emergency opener". Binks' Yorkshire colleague Fred Trueman said that the "greatest injustice of all" (by the England selectors) was their limitation of Binks to only two Tests. In Trueman's opinion, Binks was "far and away the best wicket-keeper in the country after Godfrey Evans" and several of those selected ahead of him were "nowhere near as good".

Binks had his benefit year in 1967 with a range of matches around Yorkshire and the fund realised £5,351. His chosen county match was 24–27 June at Headingley against Surrey. Yorkshire, with Trueman as acting captain, won by an innings and 92 runs (Binks scored 32 runs but took only one catch). Sir William Worsley, the club president stated: "No player in the history of Yorkshire cricket has served his County better than Jimmy Binks". Binks was a Wisden Cricketer of the Year in 1969 and retired at the end of that season.
