= John Lupton (disambiguation) =

John Lupton (1928–1993) was an American film and television actor.

John Lupton may also refer to:

- John Thomas Lupton (1862–1933), American lawyer, industrialist and philanthropist
- John T. Lupton II (1926–2010), his grandson, American businessman and philanthropist
- John M. Lupton (1856–1921), American seed-grower, politician, and banker from New York
- John Lupton (footballer) (1878–1954), English footballer
- John Lupton (physicist), British physicist
