= Lupton =

Lupton may refer to:

== Places ==
In England:

- Lupton, Cumbria
- Lupton, Brixham, an historic manor in Devon

In the United States:

- Lupton, Arizona in Apache County
- Lupton, Michigan, in Ogemaw County
- Lupton City, Chattanooga, Tennessee
- Fort Lupton, Colorado

== People ==
- Lupton family, business and political dynasty from Leeds, England
- Angela Lynch-Lupton (died 2007), mayor of Galway, Ireland
- Arthur Lupton (1879–1944), English cricketer
- Arnold Lupton (1846–1930), British Liberal Member of Parliament 1906–1910
- Cartter Lupton (1899–1977), American businessman and Coca-Cola Bottling Company magnate
- Charles Lupton (1898–1918), British World War I flying ace
- Dylan Lupton (born 1993), American racing driver
- Ellen Lupton (born 1963), American graphic designer, writer, curator and educator
- Frank Miller Lupton (1854–1888), British governor of Bahr el Ghazal province in Sudan
- Frances Lupton (1821–1892), English activist for girls' education
- Frances Platt Townsend Lupton (1779–1833), American sculptor and painter
- Geoffrey Lupton (1882–1949), British member of the Arts and Crafts Movement
- Hugh Lupton (born 1952), British oral storyteller
- John Thomas Lupton (1862–1933), American lawyer, industrialist and philanthropist
- John Lupton (1928–1993), American actor
- John Lupton (footballer) (1878–1954), English footballer
- Karen Lupton, American politician
- Lancaster Lupton (1807–1885), American soldier
- Lupton, a villain in the Doctor Who television story Planet of the Spiders
- Peter Lupton (born 1982), English rugby player
- Roger Lupton (1456–1539/40), provost of Eton College, England
- Rosamund Lupton, British author of Sister and other novels
- Ruth Lupton (born 1964), English cricketer
- Terry Lupton, American songwriter and producer
- Thomas Lupton (16th-century writer) (fl. 1572–1584)
- Thomas Goff Lupton (1791–1873), British engraver
- Tony Lupton (born 1957), Australian politician
- Vicky Lupton (born 1972), English racewalker

== Other ==
- Lupton Stadium, on Texas Christian University in Fort Worth, Texas
