= Wilfred Rhodes =

English cricketer (1877–1973)

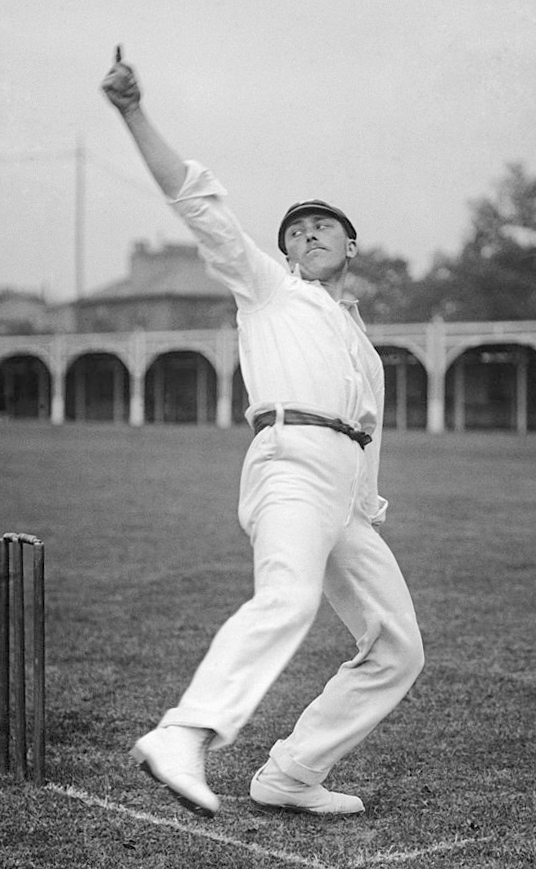
- Wilfred Rhodes bowling in 1906

Personal information
- Born: 29 October 1877; Kirkheaton, Yorkshire, England
- Died: 8 July 1973 (aged 95); Poole, Dorset, England
- Batting: Right-handed
- Bowling: Slow left-arm orthodox
- Role: All-rounder

International information
- National side: England (1899–1930)
- Test debut (cap 121): 1 June 1899 v Australia
- Last Test: 3 April 1930 v West Indies

Domestic team information
- Years: Team
- 1898–1930: Yorkshire

Career statistics
Competition	Test	First-class
Matches	58	1,110
Runs scored	2,325	39,969
Batting average	30.19	30.81
100s/50s	2/11	58/197
Top score	179	267*
Balls bowled	8,225	185,742
Wickets	127	4,204
Bowling average	26.96	16.72
5 wickets in innings	6	287
10 wickets in match	1	68
Best bowling	8/68	9/24
Catches/stumpings	60/–	765/–
- Source: ESPNcricinfo, 17 August 2007

Wilfred Rhodes (29 October 1877 – 8 July 1973) was an English professional cricketer who played 58 Test matches for England between 1899 and 1930. In Tests, Rhodes took 127 wickets and scored 2,325 runs, becoming the first Englishman to complete the double of 1,000 runs and 100 wickets in Test matches. He holds the world records both for the most appearances made in first-class cricket and the most wickets taken. He completed the double of 1,000 runs and 100 wickets in an English cricket season a record 16 times. Rhodes played for Yorkshire and England into his fifties, and in his final Test in 1930 was, at 52 years and 165 days, the oldest player who has appeared in a Test match.

Beginning his career for Yorkshire in 1898 as a slow left arm bowler, Rhodes quickly established a reputation as one of the best slow bowlers in the world. However, by the First World War he had developed his batting skills to the extent that he was regarded as one of the leading batsmen in England and had established an effective opening partnership with Jack Hobbs. The improvement in Rhodes's batting was accompanied by a temporary decline in his bowling performances, but the loss of key Yorkshire bowlers after the war led to Rhodes resuming his role as a front-line bowler. He played throughout the 1920s as an all-rounder before retiring after the 1930 cricket season. His first appearance for England was in 1899 and he played regularly in Tests until 1921. Recalled to the team in the final Ashes Test of 1926 aged 48, Rhodes played a significant part in winning the match for England who thus regained the Ashes for the first time since 1912. He ended his Test career in the West Indies in April 1930.

As a bowler, Rhodes was noted for his great accuracy, variations in flight and, in his early days, sharp spin. Critic Neville Cardus wrote: "Flight was his secret. Flight and the curving line, now higher, now lower, tempting, inimical; every ball like every other ball, yet somehow unlike; each over in collusion with the others, part of a plot". Throughout his career he was particularly effective on wet, rain affected pitches where he could bowl teams out for very low scores. His batting was regarded as solid and dependable but unspectacular, and critics accused him of excessive caution at times. However, they considered him to be an astute cricket thinker.

Following his retirement from playing cricket, he coached at Harrow School but was not a great success. His eyesight began to fail from around 1939 to the point where he was completely blind by 1952. He was given honorary membership of the Marylebone Cricket Club (MCC) in 1949 and remained a respected figure within the game until his death in 1973.

== Early life and career ==
=== Beginnings ===
Rhodes was born in the village of Kirkheaton, just outside Huddersfield, in 1877. His family moved to a farm two miles away while he was very young. He went to school in nearby Hopton, and later to Spring Grove School in Huddersfield. His father, Alfred Rhodes, was captain of the Kirkheaton cricket team's Second XI and encouraged his son to play cricket, buying him equipment and having a pitch laid near their home for Wilfred to practise. By the time Rhodes left school, aged 16, he had joined Kirkheaton Cricket Club and started to take cricket seriously: he watched Yorkshire when they played close to his home and began to consider a career as a professional cricketer. Around 1893 he took a job as an engine cleaner at the locomotive sheds in the local town of Mirfield. By now playing regularly for Kirkheaton Second XI, Rhodes's keenness to reach one game on time led him to ring the off-duty bell before the end of the shift and as a result he lost his job. Subsequently, he worked on a local farm, which allowed him more time for cricket. By 1895 he achieved a place in the Kirkheaton first team, and was recommended to Gala Cricket Club, of Galashiels, Scotland, as a professional.

=== Professional club cricketer ===
Rhodes played for Gala Cricket Club in 1896 and 1897, as an all-rounder who opened the batting and bowled medium paced seamers. He took 92 wickets in his first season, and discovered that bowling an occasional slow ball brought him some success. He decided to change his bowling style to spin, and spent the winter of 1896–97 practising on the family farm while also working again on the railway, this time as a signalman. Over several months, Rhodes used his practice sessions to develop control of spin and different types of delivery. Consequently, in his second season at Galashiels, now bowling slow left-arm spin, he took fewer wickets but at a better average. At the end of the 1897 season, encouraged by a Scottish member of the MCC, he resigned from Gala to look for work in England.

== First-class cricketer ==
=== Beginning as a bowler ===
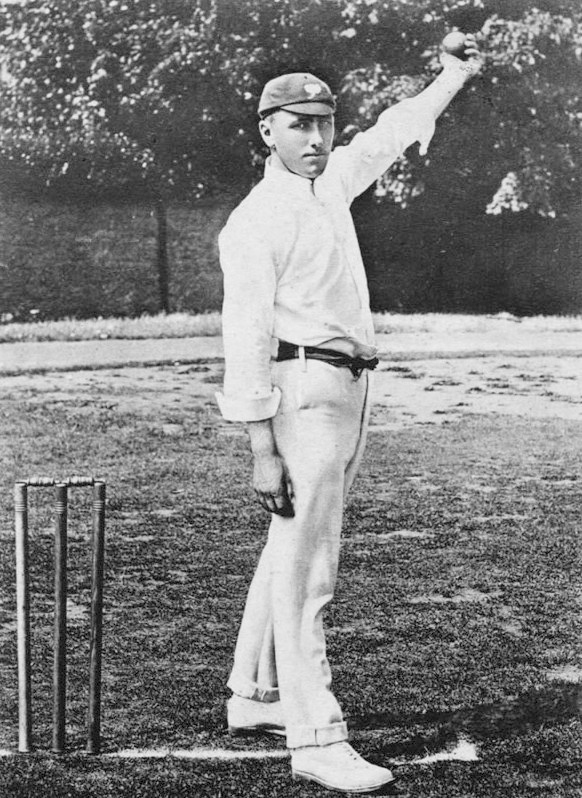
Wilfred Rhodes early in his career, around 1900

In response to an advertisement, Rhodes applied to join the ground staff of Warwickshire County Cricket Club, but the club were unable to offer him an engagement for financial reasons. At this time Yorkshire were looking for a slow left arm spinner to replace Bobby Peel, who had been sacked following a disciplinary lapse on the field in front of his captain Lord Hawke in August 1897. Rhodes successfully applied for a place in a Yorkshire Colts team to play against the County XI. However, as he later admitted, Rhodes had a poor match, while his rival for Peel's place in the team, Albert Cordingley, took nine wickets.

In early spring 1898, Rhodes was invited to the nets at Headingley, which led to him playing in some friendly matches (unofficial matches involving first-class teams). Rhodes went on to make his first-class debut for Yorkshire on 12 May 1898 against the MCC, taking six wickets in the match. In his second game, he made his County Championship debut on 16 May 1898 against Somerset, taking 13 wickets for 45 runs. In the 1898 season, according to Wisden Cricketers' Almanack Rhodes "sprang at once into fame, bowling in match after match for Yorkshire with astounding success." By the end of the season he had taken 154 wickets at an average of 14.60, and was named as one of the Wisden Cricketers of the Year for 1899. The citation stated: "There can be no doubt as to the greatness of his achievements last summer ... His qualities as a slow bowler struck everyone as being exceptional"; however, it was noted that bad weather in the first part of the summer created some difficult pitches for batting. As a batsman he scored three fifties, and Wisden rated him "a dangerous run-getter". By the end of the season, according to cricket writer Neville Cardus, Rhodes had proven himself to be the best left-arm spinner in England.

In 1899, Rhodes took 179 wickets at an average of 17.10 in a reasonably dry season; this weather meant that pitches were harder, easier to bat on, and less likely to suit his bowling. Wisden described him as "head and shoulders above his colleagues". He made his Test debut in the five-match series against Australia, playing in three of the five Tests; his first Test coincided with W. G. Grace's last. As well as Grace, his teammates included C. B. Fry, K. S. Ranjitsinhji, and George Hirst. Rhodes opened the English bowling and took four wickets for 58 in an Australian total of 252; his first Test wicket was Monty Noble (whose wicket he took again in the second innings). He was described by Wisden as bowling "steady and well" on the first day. Rhodes took three wickets in the second Test, but the selectors omitted him from the third match, a decision Wisden believed was mistaken. He did not play again until the final Test, and he finished with 13 wickets in the series, equal with J. T. Hearne as England's leading Test wicket-taker for the summer. Rhodes was also selected to represent the Players against the Gentlemen at Lord's for the first time that season, although W. G. Grace and C. B. Fry scored heavily against him.

Rhodes's most successful seasons in terms of wickets were the three seasons from 1900 to 1902. In these years, Rhodes took 725 wickets at an average of 14.07, taking five or more wickets in an innings 68 times and taking ten or more wickets in a match 21 times, assisting Yorkshire to three consecutive County Championships. In 1900, Rhodes took 261 wickets as bad weather made pitches helpful to his bowling. In 1901, the weather was much better, leading to pitches that were good for batting, but Rhodes took 251 wickets, an achievement described by Wisden as astonishing. Against MCC that year, Rhodes scored his maiden first-class century, batting at number nine. In the 1902 season, Rhodes took 213 wickets, fewer than 1901 despite a greater number of favourable pitches in a wet summer. This attracted unfavourable comment from some critics who had expected more.

The main cricket event of 1902 was the Australian tour of England. Rhodes played in all five Tests and was England's leading wicket-taker with 22 wickets at an average of 15.27. He took seven for 17 in the first innings of the first Test, out of an Australian total of 36, in conditions that the umpires considered reasonable for batting; Wisden noted that Rhodes and Hirst bowled very well. However, C. B. Fry believed that Hirst was more difficult to play and that while Rhodes bowled well, the Australian batsmen got themselves out as they "hurried to the other end and tried to hit Rhodes, without success". Rain meant the game was drawn and washed out most of the second match. In the third Test, which England lost, Rhodes took five for 63, including a spell of four wickets in nineteen balls. In the fourth Test, Rhodes took seven wickets in the match, taking three quick wickets in the first innings, but receiving some heavy punishment. He was batting at the end of the match, but was unable to prevent Australia from snatching victory to win by three runs and take the series. The final Test, at The Oval, was dominated by Gilbert Jessop and Hirst, but when England needed 263 to win in the final innings, Rhodes came in to bat after the ninth wicket fell with 15 needed for England to win. It has been claimed that Hirst said to Rhodes, "We'll get 'em in singles", but neither batsman could remember those words being said and not all the runs came in singles. The two Yorkshiremen were not dismissed, and England won by one wicket.

In 1903, Rhodes scored over 1,000 runs in the season for the first time, in the process completing his first double of 1,000 runs and 100 wickets. However, after bowling a large number of overs against Worcestershire early in the season, he had little success as a bowler for a spell of three weeks. Pelham Warner, a leading amateur cricketer and later captain of England, noted that Rhodes was comparatively unsuccessful at the start of the year but came back well to take 193 wickets. Warner wrote that Rhodes at this time was accused of being easy to face on a wicket which suited the batsmen, although Warner himself did not agree.

=== From all-rounder to specialist batsman ===
Warner toured prolifically with cricket teams and was chosen to captain the first MCC-sponsored tour of Australia in the winter of 1903–04. Warner was primarily responsible for the selection of players, and he selected Rhodes among his first choices for the team. Although K. S. Ranjitsinhji predicted that Rhodes "would not take a dozen wickets" on the tour, Warner believed that Rhodes and Hirst were the best two bowlers in England. In the event, Warner rated Rhodes the "mainstay of the team", and Wisden observed that he proved critics wrong, establishing himself as the most effective bowler on the tour. The Wisden summary of the tour pointed out that rain made an unusually high number of pitches, by Australian standards, helpful for Rhodes's style of bowling, but he bowled well on all types of pitches. On the whole tour, the Yorkshire bowler took 65 first-class wickets at an average of 16.23, including 31 wickets at an average of 15.74 in the Test matches.

England won the Test series 3–2 after winning the first, second and fourth games. In the first match Rhodes contributed 40 runs to a tenth wicket partnership of 130 with R. E. Foster, who scored 287, to assist the team in building a large lead. This was a Test record partnership for the tenth wicket, and remained so for 70 years; until 2014, it was a record for England's 10th wicket. When Victor Trumper led an Australian fightback, scoring 185 not out, only Rhodes could slow his scoring in conditions which, according to Warner, were very good for batting. Steady bowling through the innings brought Rhodes figures of five for 94; Warner wrote: "what we should have done without Rhodes I do not know".

In the second Test, badly affected by the weather, Rhodes had a match analysis of 15 wickets for 124 runs, the best bowling analysis recorded in a match between England and Australia until 1934 and the equal highest number of wickets taken in a match by a single player at that time (although other players had given away fewer runs). Rain made the pitch very difficult to bat on, but Wisden praised Rhodes and observed that eight catches were dropped from his bowling. His eight for 68 in the second innings remained his best figures in Tests. Australia won the third Test, but the decisive fourth Test was won by England and Rhodes contributed with bat and ball. In the first innings, while the crowd chanted in an attempt to distract him, he took four for 33 as the last five Australian wickets fell for 17 runs in favourable batting conditions. Later, Rhodes added 55 for the tenth wicket in the second innings with his captain. However, he was less effective as England lost the final Test.

Rhodes believed that the 1903–04 tour was a turning point in his career as a bowler and that afterwards he was never the same. Part of the reason was a change in his bowling style. He had noticed that it was necessary for him to bowl faster in Australia to be effective, and on his return to England he continued with this faster style until the First World War. Rhodes thought that another reason for his relative bowling decline was the development of his batting which took up much of his time. His biographer, Sidney Rogerson, speculates that further deterioration may have been caused by the strain of regular bowling on his fingers and wrist, and his more robust, muscular frame in his mid-twenties. Rogerson believes that Rhodes was affected by the break-up of the successful Yorkshire team which had peaked between 1900 and 1902. More batting responsibility was placed on his shoulders, and he received less support in the field as the team personnel changed. Consequently, Rhodes scored more runs and moved further up the batting order after 1903, but his bowling gradually declined until the war.

In 1904, Rhodes took 131 wickets, the fewest in a season of his career to date. He scored 1,537 runs, including two hundreds (the second and third of his career) to complete his second double. He generally batted at number six or seven in the batting order, but in two games he opened the batting. In 1905, Yorkshire won the Championship; Rhodes again completed the double, with 1,581 runs, his two hundreds including a double hundred. He took 182 wickets, but Wisden judged that he was not as dangerous a bowler on slow wickets as he had been. Rhodes played in four of the five Tests against Australia that year. He scored 29 and 39 not out in the first Test, but in the second, suffered an injured finger which reduced his effectiveness and caused him to miss the next Test. In the fourth Test, Rhodes took five wickets in the match, including three for 36 in the second innings. However, the England captain, Stanley Jackson, showed, in the words of Wisden, "a curious want of faith in Rhodes", even though he was bowling well. His fielding was singled out for praise as he took four catches, two of them regarded as brilliant. England eventually won the series 2–0; Rhodes contributed 146 runs, at an average of 48.66 and a top score of 39 not out, and ten wickets at an average of 31.40.

From left to right: Schofield Haigh, George Hirst and Rhodes. The Yorkshire teammates at Marsden, 1905.

The relative deterioration in Rhodes's bowling continued into the 1906 season when Wisden commented that he had lost his sharp spin and was not dangerous on a hard wicket. Rhodes scored 1,721 runs, now regularly opening the batting, and completed another double with 128 wickets, but the Wisden correspondent did not believe this compensated for his lost bowling. In 1907, Rhodes scored fewer runs and increased his bowling aggregate, securing 173 wickets in a wet season. Wisden believed his greater bowling success was due to a reduced batting contribution, but he still completed the double by scoring 1,045 runs. During that season, Rhodes was again asked to open the batting for Yorkshire and he was chosen as the permanent replacement for John Tunnicliffe as Yorkshire's opening batsman. Several batsmen had been tried in the position, but Rhodes's superior defensive technique with the bat secured him the role. Despite the increase in wickets, Rhodes was not picked for any of the Tests that year against South Africa, Colin Blythe being preferred.

Rhodes and Blythe both went to Australia the following winter (1907–08) with MCC, but Rhodes was now regarded primarily as a batsman and only a "change" bowler who would be the third or fourth used. In the five Test series, lost 4–1 by England, Rhodes scored 205 runs at an average of 20.50, including his first Test fifty in the fourth innings of the last Test. He took four for 102 in Australia's second innings of that Test, and finished the Test series with seven wickets at an average of 60.14. In all first-class matches on the tour, Rhodes scored 929 runs at an average of 48.89 and took 31 wickets at an average of 34.48. He followed this with another double in 1908 of 1,660 runs and 106 wickets as Yorkshire won the County Championship.

In 1909, Rhodes scored 2,094 runs at an average of 40.26, which was to remain his second highest run aggregate and average for an English cricket season, and took 141 wickets. Sidney Rogerson believed that this season marked the completion of his transformation into a batsman. This view was supported by Wisden, which judged that he had "now become such an exceptionally good batsman that the regret one used to feel at his ever giving his mind to run getting has lost its force." He played in four of the five Tests against Australia in 1909; his omission from the second Test was later described as an error of judgement by the editor of Wisden, one of many selectorial blunders as England lost the series two games to one. Rhodes scored 168 runs at an average of 33.60, and took 11 wickets at an average of 22.00. In the first Test, he had a quiet time, scoring an unbeaten 15, batting at number eight, and bowling only one over. Recalled for the third Test, Rhodes bowled a spell in which four wickets were captured for seven runs, before being hit for four fours in one over by Trumper. His first innings figures were four for 38 and he took another two wickets for 44 runs in the second innings. In the fourth Test, Wisden believed that Rhodes alone bowled well on the second day, taking five for 83. Although moved up the order to bat at number five, he scored just five runs in the match. In the final Test, he batted at number three and scored two fifties, 66 and 54, adding 104 in the first innings with C. B. Fry and another 61 to save the game with the same batsman in the second.

=== Opening batsman ===
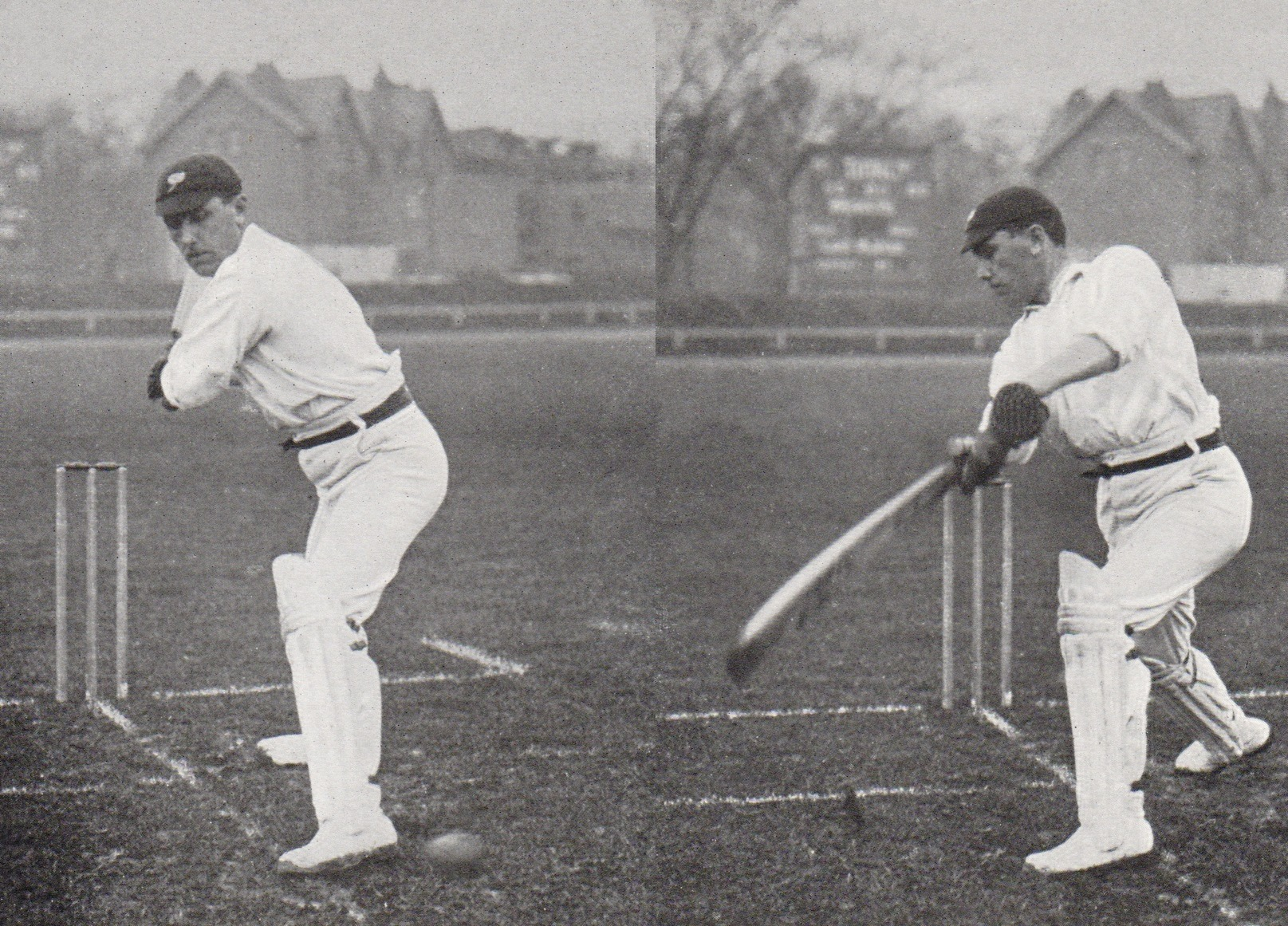
Before and after pictures of Rhodes playing a drive, photographed by George Beldam in 1906

In the 1909–10 English winter, MCC toured South Africa with a team below full Test strength. Rhodes opened the batting throughout the tour, partnering Jack Hobbs for the first time. However, Wisden stated that only Hobbs would have been sure of his batting place in a full strength England team, and that both Rhodes and David Denton, the next best batsmen, were a long way behind Hobbs. In all first-class matches, Rhodes scored 499 runs at an average of 26.26, with three fifties, and took 21 wickets at 25.47. In the Test series, which South Africa won 3–2, Rhodes took only two wickets in the five games. As a batsman, however, he shared some large partnerships with Hobbs. England lost the first two Tests, although in the first Rhodes and Hobbs put on 159 for the first wicket, of which Rhodes made 66. In the second Test the pair put on 94 in the first innings and 48 in the second, Rhodes made little impact on the third and fourth Tests; in the final Test, an England victory, he and Hobbs scored 221 together, Rhodes making what was then his highest Test score of 77. Wisden stated that while overshadowed by the brilliance of Hobbs, Rhodes in this innings batted without mistakes. In the five Tests Rhodes scored 226 runs, averaging 25.11. During the tour Rhodes and Hobbs developed mutual trust while batting together, to the point where they could score runs without having to call to each other. This degree of understanding was unusual at the time. After the Test series ended, several amateur members of the team wanted to extend the tour into Rhodesia, but the professionals refused to take part as their contracts did not cover this and they would have effectively played for no wages. Rhodes, although not the ring-leader, was influential in this strike, and a sports newspaper, Winning Post, singled him out as responsible in an article highly critical of him and the other professionals.

In the 1910 domestic season Rhodes was less productive in batting and bowling, and Yorkshire finished only eighth in the County Championship, a result considered very poor within the county. Rhodes scored 1,465 runs at an average of 26.63, and took 88 wickets at an average of 18.98, the first time since the start of his career that he had taken less than 100 wickets in an English season. In 1911, when Yorkshire finished seventh in the County Championship, it was a fine, dry summer, which meant generally good batting wickets. Rhodes was more productive with 2,261 runs, the second and final time that he passed 2,000 runs in an English summer, and the highest season's total of his career. He averaged 38.32 with the bat, and took 117 wickets. Rhodes was given a benefit match against Lancashire from which he received £750. After Yorkshire launched an appeal, the total was boosted to £2,200, still considerably less than the record benefit total of £3,703 raised for George Hirst in 1904.

=== Batting success in Australia ===
In September 1911 Rhodes made his third visit to Australia, this time as the opening partner of Jack Hobbs. The tour proved to be the "absolute pinnacle of his success as a batsman", according to Rogerson. Under the captaincy of Johnny Douglas, England won the 1911–12 Test series against Australia 4–1, after losing the first Test. While the success of the tourists was attributed to their powerful bowling attack, C. B. Fry described the English victories as "a succession of triumphs for Jack Hobbs and Rhodes as first wicket batsmen." Pelham Warner, who was nominally captain but missed the entire series due to illness, said that in "innings after innings they [Hobbs and Rhodes] gave us a wonderful start", adding that he had run out of words to praise their contributions.

In the first Test, the only one of the series in which he did not open, Rhodes made 41 and 0 in England's defeat. In the second match, opening with Hobbs, Rhodes scored 61 in the first innings, passing 1,000 Test career runs in the process. Wisden recorded that apart from Rhodes and J. W. Hearne, with whom he shared a century partnership, the batting was very disappointing. In the second innings, Rhodes added 57 for the first wicket with Hobbs, helping England to an eight-wicket victory. In the next Test Rhodes scored 59 out of an opening partnership of 147 with Hobbs, and 57 not out as England won again, this time by seven wickets. In the fourth Test, which England won overwhelmingly to take the series, Rhodes scored 179 as he and Hobbs scored 323 for the first wicket. At the time, this was a Test record partnership for any wicket. As of 2015, it remains England's highest first wicket partnership against Australia. This was Rhodes's first Test century, and remained his highest Test score. Wisden commented that his seven-hour innings was "a remarkable display of careful batting." In the final Test victory Rhodes put on 76 with Hobbs in the second innings, to finish the series with 463 runs at an average of 57.87, the best series average of his career. On the tour as a whole, he scored 1,098 runs at an average of 54.90, but he did not take a single first-class wicket; in the Tests he only bowled 18 overs.

=== Triangular tournament ===
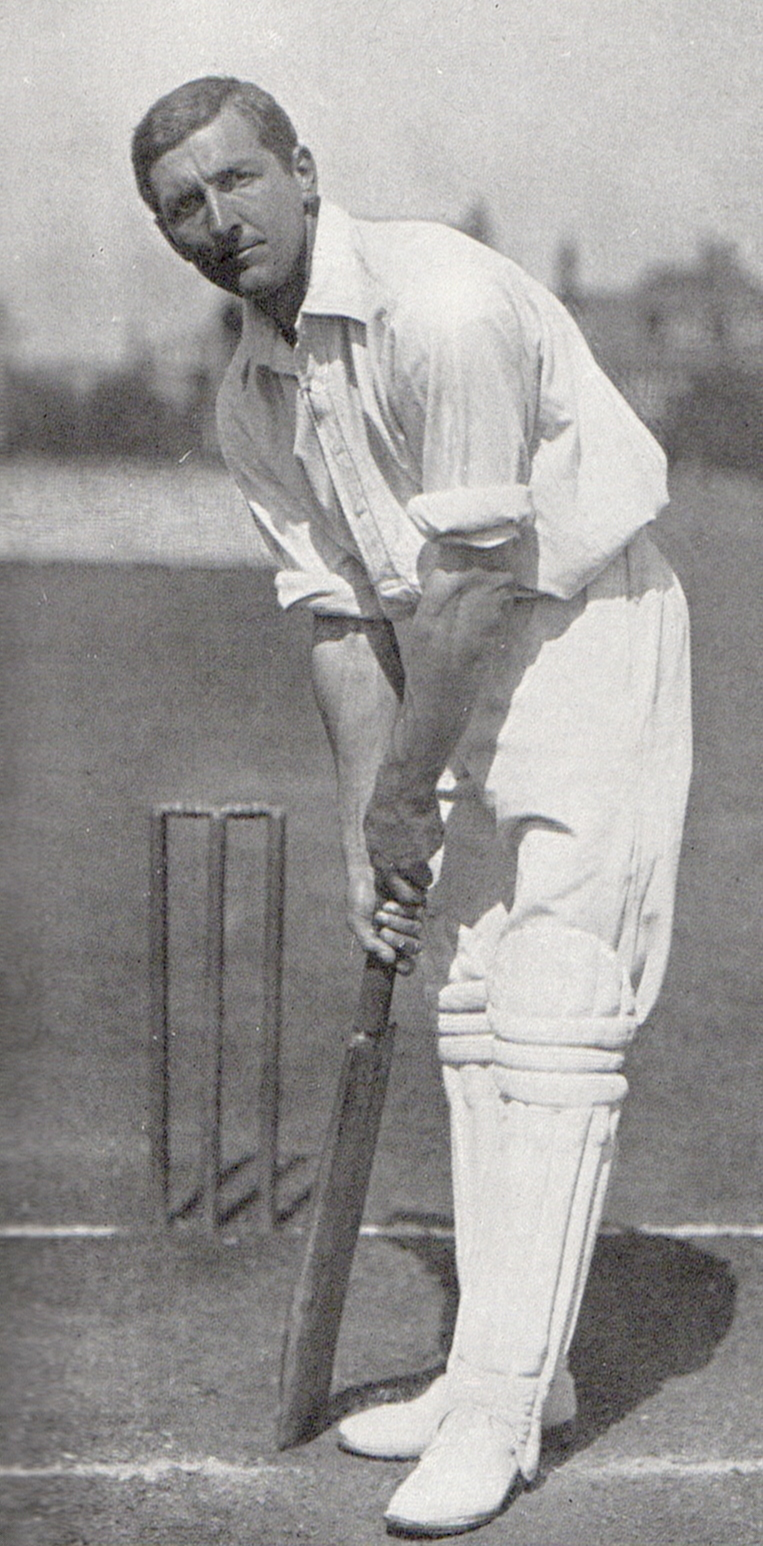
C. B. Fry, pictured in 1906, was Rhodes's England captain in 1912.

On their return home for the 1912 season England, captained by C. B. Fry, were involved in the first-ever triangular Test tournament, consisting of matches between England, Australia and South Africa. This experiment was severely affected by wet weather, the weakness of the South African team, and a dispute among the Australian team which resulted in a substandard team being sent. Rhodes played as Hobbs' opening partner in each of England's six matches and once again won praise from Wisden. In England's first match, a victory against South Africa, Rhodes scored 36, his steady defence being described as invaluable. In the following drawn game against Australia, Hobbs and Rhodes scored 112 for the first wicket. Rhodes scored 59, his first 52 runs being scored out of a total of 77 before he slowed down; Wisden reported that the later part of his innings was "as cautious as the first part was brilliant". Later in the match Rhodes bowled and took three wickets for 59, his only bowling success of the tournament.

After a quiet second match against South Africa, Rhodes scored 92 out of a total of 203 in a rain-ruined game against Australia. The difficult batting conditions were such that Fry described Rhodes as "digging his runs out of the slush." Rhodes had another poor match against South Africa, but in the final match against Australia, which would decide the winner of the tournament, Rhodes scored 49 in an opening stand of 107 with Hobbs in the first innings, considered a great achievement in testing batting conditions. England went on to win in the match and hence the tournament. Rhodes had scored 204 runs at an average of 51.00 against Australia, but only 53 runs at an average of 13.25 against the South Africans. In all first-class matches that summer, Rhodes scored 1,576 runs (averaging 30.90), and took 53 wickets (average 21.98), his lowest total of wickets in an English season, and only the second time since 1903 that he had not completed the double.

=== Last pre-war seasons ===
Rhodes again failed to complete the double in 1913, scoring 1,963 runs (average 32.71) and taking 86 wickets (average 21.88). In the 1913–14 English winter, Rhodes went to South Africa with the MCC under the captaincy of Douglas. A strong England team won the five-match series 4–0 against weak opposition. Rhodes scored 731 runs in first-class matches, averaging 34.80, and took 31 wickets at 21.35, which led Wisden to comment on his value as an all-rounder. In the second Test Rhodes took one wicket, his 100th in Test matches, and completed the double of 1,000 runs and 100 wickets in Tests; the first England player to do so, he was only the third player to reach the double after Australians George Giffen and Monty Noble. In the same match, Rhodes made his second and final Test century, scoring 152 and adding 141 for the first wicket with Albert Relf. He batted for more than five hours, and Wisden said that he "was too cautious to please the crowd, but his steadiness was invaluable to his side." His batting was overshadowed, as Sydney Barnes took 17 wickets in the match. Rhodes resumed his opening partnership with Hobbs in the third Test, sharing a stand of 100, followed by opening partnerships of 92 and 133 in the fourth Test, the only drawn match of the series. In this match Rhodes took three wickets for 33 in the first South African innings. In all Tests on the tour Rhodes scored 289 runs at an average of 41.28 and took six wickets (average 32.50).

In the final season before the First World War, Rhodes scored 1,377 runs. Yorkshire used him more often as a bowler and his tally of wickets consequently increased to 118, enabling him to complete another double. Following the outbreak of war in August 1914, first-class cricket came to an end for four years. While many cricketers joined the army Rhodes, like George Hirst and Schofield Haigh, went to work in a munitions factory in Huddersfield. He and Hirst were paid by Yorkshire to be available to play in war-time cricket matches on a certain number of Saturdays.

== Career after the First World War ==
=== Leading bowler again ===
When cricket resumed after the war in 1919, no-one was sure how popular county cricket would be and so the County Championship matches were reduced to two days instead of three. However, critics and players judged the experiment a failure, owing to the long hours of play and frequent travelling which arose from playing up to three games a week; Rhodes and other players were also dissatisfied by wages offered. Yorkshire won the championship with a much-changed team from that which had played in 1914. The bowling attack was weaker: Hirst's age lessened his effectiveness with the ball, Major Booth was killed in the war, and Alonzo Drake died from illness in January 1919. Consequently, Rhodes decided to make up the shortfall by resuming full-time bowling. With increased practice, he took more wickets and regained his confidence. Although unable to spin or flight the ball as well as previously, Rhodes bowled a very accurate length and used his great experience effectively. The success of Percy Holmes and Herbert Sutcliffe as opening batsmen meant that, although Rhodes began the season opening the batting, he was able to move down the order and bat at number four. He scored 1,237 runs, and by taking 164 wickets at an average of 14.42, finished top of the national first-class bowling averages. Around this time, Rhodes was approached by Haslingden Cricket Club from the Lancashire League, to play cricket for them as a professional. Rhodes, primarily through unhappiness with the 1919 playing conditions, seriously considered the offer before he declined. Some of his concerns were addressed before the following season, when matches returned to three days and wages were increased. In the following season, Rhodes scored 1,123 runs, took 161 wickets at an average of 13.18, and was chosen to go to Australia with the 1920–21 MCC touring team.

=== Australian tour, 1920–21 ===
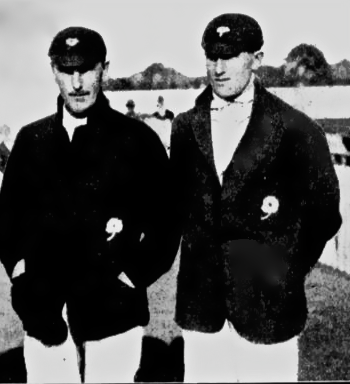
Rhodes (left) and Abe Waddington on tour in Australia in 1920

As English cricket had not fully recovered from the effects of the war, the team which toured Australia was weak in bowling. Confronted by a far better Australian team than anyone had expected, England lost all five Test matches, an unprecedented result that Wisden regarded as a "disaster". Rhodes now played for Yorkshire as a middle-order batsman and front-line bowler but England's captain Douglas showed uncertainty whether to use Rhodes in this capacity, or to revert to his pre-war role as Hobbs's opening partner. Until the first Test Rhodes batted mainly down the order; after this he returned to opening the batting. On the tour Rhodes scored two centuries, one a double-century, totalling in all 730 runs in all first-class matches at an average of 38.42. Although a leading bowler in England in 1919 and 1920, Rhodes bowled infrequently and with limited success. After taking six for 39 against Victoria in helpful conditions, he rarely bowled, and took only 18 first-class wickets (averaging 26.61) on the tour.

In the Tests, Rhodes scored 238 runs at an average of 23.80, with a highest score of 73 in the fourth Test. In the first Test, a score of 45 took him past 2,000 Test runs. As a bowler, Rhodes took four Test wickets in the series at an average of 61.25; his best figures were three for 61 in the third Test. Rhodes later said that Douglas was reluctant to use him, believing his bowling would be ineffective on Australian pitches. Wisden commented: "It must be said, however, that in a summer of continuous sunshine – remarkable even for Australia – the bowlers received no help." Nevertheless, much of Rhodes's tour, according to A. A. Thomson, "may be fairly regarded as failure." Tour manager and Yorkshire secretary Frederick Toone, with whom Rhodes had already had a disagreement during the 1920 season, apparently said that "Wilfred's finished", a remark later reported to Rhodes.

=== Senior professional ===
The 1921 season was a turning point for Rhodes for several reasons. His regular England career ended during the visit of the Australians. The tourists, as Wisden reported, overwhelmed England, exposing many weaknesses in the team, and reduced the English selectors to "catch[ing] at straws". 30 players were used in the five-match Test series, which England lost by three matches to none. Rhodes played in the first Test, scored 19 and 10 and took two wickets in a heavy defeat. Although his performance was no worse than that of others, he was dropped from the team for the rest of the series and did not play another Test for five years. At the time, it was suggested his place was lost because he was uncomfortable against the fast bowling of Jack Gregory and Ted McDonald, who devastated and demoralised many English batsmen during the season. As a result of these problems with pace bowling Rhodes altered his batting stance to use the "two-eyed stance"; instead of using the traditional technique of standing at right angles to the bowler, the batsman turned his body towards the bowler. Critics complained that this method was ugly; it restricted the shots that could be made, and led to some batsmen using their pads as an extra form of defence to stop the ball hitting the wicket. According to his Wisden obituary, Rhodes was one of the first men to adopt this batting stance. Rhodes faced a further development following the retirements of Hirst and Denton from Yorkshire; he became the county's senior professional. This position offered no official powers or responsibilities but was nevertheless significant as senior professionals influenced tactics, strategy and morale. Rhodes held this post until his retirement.

In all first-class cricket in 1921, Rhodes scored 1,474 runs at an average of 39.83. This included his highest first-class score of 267 not out against Leicestershire, struck on the day England began the second Test, having just dropped Rhodes. Rhodes took 141 wickets in the season, at an average of 13.27. In the autumn, he travelled to India, coaching and playing for the Maharaja of Patiala's private team; Rhodes repeated this trip every year until 1927, sometimes accompanied by other players. On five occasions in India he completed a 1,000 runs and 100 wickets double, although most of these games were not first-class.

In each of the four seasons from 1922 to 1925, Yorkshire won the County Championship. Rhodes scored over 1,000 runs each year, averaging over 30 except in 1924; in 1925 his average was 40.91, only the second time it exceeded 40 in an English cricket season. Rhodes, by now part of a very powerful county bowling attack, was usually the fourth or fifth bowler used. Although he imparted less spin to the ball than in his younger days, he continually bowled a good length and placed fielders in positions which very effectively blocked the scoring opportunities of the batsmen. He took over 100 wickets in 1922, 1923 and 1924, but took only 57 in 1925, a very good year for batting. As Yorkshire's senior professional Rhodes was very influential in this period. He cultivated a hostile attitude among the bowlers, directed the team tactically and raised its standard of fielding. Alan Hill wrote that Yorkshire captains (who were usually poor cricketers) generally deferred to Rhodes as senior professional; for example, Arthur Lupton, captain from 1925 to 1927, "very wisely left the cricket affairs to the joint supervision of Rhodes and Emmott Robinson." Stories emerged that he was an "overmighty subject", arranging the positions of fielders and changing the bowler without reference to his nominal captain. In one story, Yorkshire had scored around 400. Lupton, hoping to score some easy runs, came out of the amateur dressing room with his bat when a young professional touched his arm and said, "It's all right, sir. Mr Rhodes has declared [the innings over]." However, all the captains to whom biographer Sidney Rogerson spoke mentioned their good relations with Rhodes, although they agreed that he could be difficult. Beverley Lyon, who captained Gloucestershire between 1929 and 1934, criticised Rhodes for insisting young professionals take the game seriously, thus promoting a no-risk attitude.

=== Recalled for the Oval ===
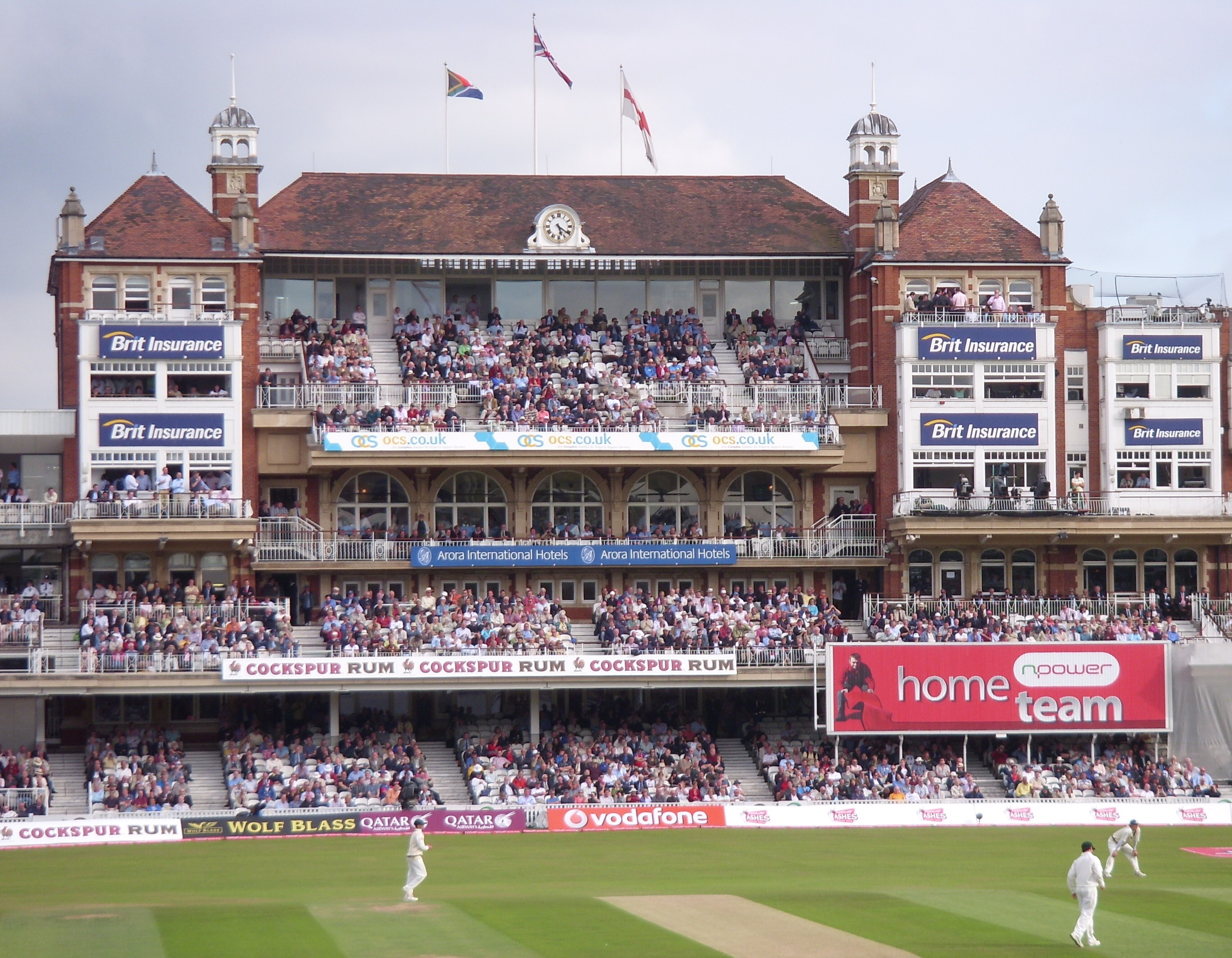
The Pavilion at the Oval, the scene of Rhodes successes in 1902 and 1926. Although this is a modern picture, the pavilion is the same as it was when Rhodes played there.

Reviewing the 1925 season, Wisden commented on Rhodes's age and reduced performance. "In the nature of things, Rhodes, approaching the completion of his 48th year, could not be expected to prove very deadly in a dry summer ... If less effective in bowling, he did fine work with the bat". However, in 1926, Wisden reported that, despite his age and in contrast to the other bowlers in the team, Rhodes "came out in wonderful form ... [His] triumph delighted everybody ... He not only accomplished skilful work in bowling but made his thousand runs [in county matches] with an average of 40." Rhodes doubled his wicket tally from 1925, taking 115 at an average of 14.86. In all first-class matches he scored 1,132 runs (average 34.30), the final time he passed 1,000 runs in a season, and completed his 16th and final double.

In 1926 the Australians toured England for the first time since 1921. The English selectors decided to add two professional cricketers to their committee, choosing Rhodes and Jack Hobbs. With Rhodes in such good form and leading the bowling averages, the selectors tried to convince him to play for England on several occasions through the season but he refused on the grounds that younger men should be chosen. The first four Tests were all drawn; the selectors were conscious, as England entered the final Test, the team had won only one of its previous 19 matches against Australia. The deciding game, at the Oval, was to be played to a finish no matter how long it took. The selectors dropped the captain, Arthur Carr, and replaced him with the inexperienced Percy Chapman. They also recalled Rhodes, aged nearly 49, having finally overcome his objections. According to Wisden, the selection of Rhodes "naturally occasioned a good deal of surprise".

England batted first, but made a disappointing total of 280; Rhodes, batting at number seven, scored 28. In the Australian innings of 302 Rhodes bowled 25 overs and took two wickets for 35, helped by a worn area on the pitch which helped him to spin the ball. He later described feeling nervous when first bowling, but said that he was heartened by the warm welcome he received from the crowd. After the start of England's second innings an overnight thunderstorm soaked the pitch, leaving it very difficult to bat on next day. However, Hobbs and Sutcliffe put on 172 runs for the first wicket and England eventually scored 436, leaving Australia to make 415 to win in unfavourable conditions for batting. Rhodes quickly began taking wickets, and went on to take four for 44. Australia were bowled out for 125, and amid widespread jubilation, England won the series and Ashes. Wisden's judged Rhodes's selection to be "crowned with complete success", his bowling "proving no small factor in determining the issue of the struggle." The Wisden editor believed Rhodes had shown himself still to be England's best bowler and called his triumph "immensely popular."

=== Late career ===
Rhodes continued to play for Yorkshire until 1930, but averaged under 30 with the bat in each season and only scored one more hundred, in 1928. He failed to reach 1,000 runs in a season again, but as a bowler he took 85 wickets in 1927, 115 in 1928 and 100 in 1929. In 1927 the Yorkshire committee opened a public testimonial for Rhodes, donating £250 themselves; it eventually raised £1,821, During the 1927 season, he played his 1,000th first-class match when Yorkshire played Nottinghamshire on 23 July, becoming the first and, as of 2015, only cricketer to play so many first-class matches. During a 10 May 1929 match against Oxford University, he became the first, and so far only, man to take 4,000 first-class wickets.

By 1927, Yorkshire wished to appoint a more competent and permanent captain, instead of continuing the succession of ineffective amateurs, and planned to ask Herbert Sutcliffe, a professional, to take the post. Frederick Toone encouraged Rhodes to offer his resignation as senior professional, possibly with a view to installing a new regime, but Rhodes declined. Meanwhile, the proposed appointment of Sutcliffe caused controversy; some members of the county believed Rhodes should be appointed. Rhodes pointed out he had not been offered the captaincy, nor had his views been sought. He felt unappreciated when he was not offered first refusal of the captaincy. A poll of Yorkshire members showed a marked preference for Rhodes over Sutcliffe as captain; the disagreements led Sutcliffe to decline the offer, and another amateur was appointed.

In 1929–30, Rhodes was selected in a MCC team, containing several veteran players, to tour West Indies; he described it as an "old crocks" team. Given a heavy workload with the ball, he took 39 first-class wickets, averaging 24.28, and scored 129 runs at an average of 25.80 with a top score 36. In the four Test matches Rhodes took ten wickets at an average of 45.30. On 12 April 1930, the last day of the final Test, Rhodes was aged 52 years and 165 days, making him the oldest-ever Test cricketer.

=== Retirement and coaching ===
During the 1930 season, Rhodes announced his intention to retire from cricket at the end of the summer. He was finding it harder to take wickets, and the workload placed on him in the West Indies had decreased his enthusiasm for the game. Hedley Verity and Bill Bowes had by this time emerged to strengthen the Yorkshire bowling. Through an ex-captain of Yorkshire, Harrow School offered Rhodes the post of professional cricket coach, which he accepted. Rhodes missed several matches towards the end of the 1930 season, before ending his career at the Scarborough Festival. His last match was for H. D. G. Leveson Gower's XI against the Australians, where his figures were five for 93; he took a wicket with his last ball in first-class cricket. Rhodes's figures for his final season were 73 wickets at an average of 19.10, and 478 runs at an average of 22.76.

Over his career Rhodes appeared in 1,110 first-class matches, which remains a world record. In these games he scored 39,969 runs, the 17th-highest career total of any batsman. He took 4,204 wickets, a record total in first-class cricket. In his 58 Tests Rhodes scored 2,325 runs (average 30.19) and took 127 wickets (average 26.96). He was the first player in the world to accumulate 2,000 runs and 100 wickets in Tests.

Rhodes coached at Harrow School until 1936. Cricket was very important to the school, which was following the lead of Eton College which had appointed George Hirst as its own coach. However, Rhodes's personality and generally critical nature did not communicate well to privileged schoolboys who were accustomed to getting their own way, and he was eventually replaced with the more genial and sympathetic Middlesex professional Patsy Hendren. This was in contrast to the success Hirst enjoyed at Eton. According to Bowes, Rhodes had vast technical knowledge, but unlike Hirst did not know how to get the best out of people. "[He] could not relate to beginners. But if you were a Test match player looking to get advice, Wilfred was superb."

== Style and personality ==
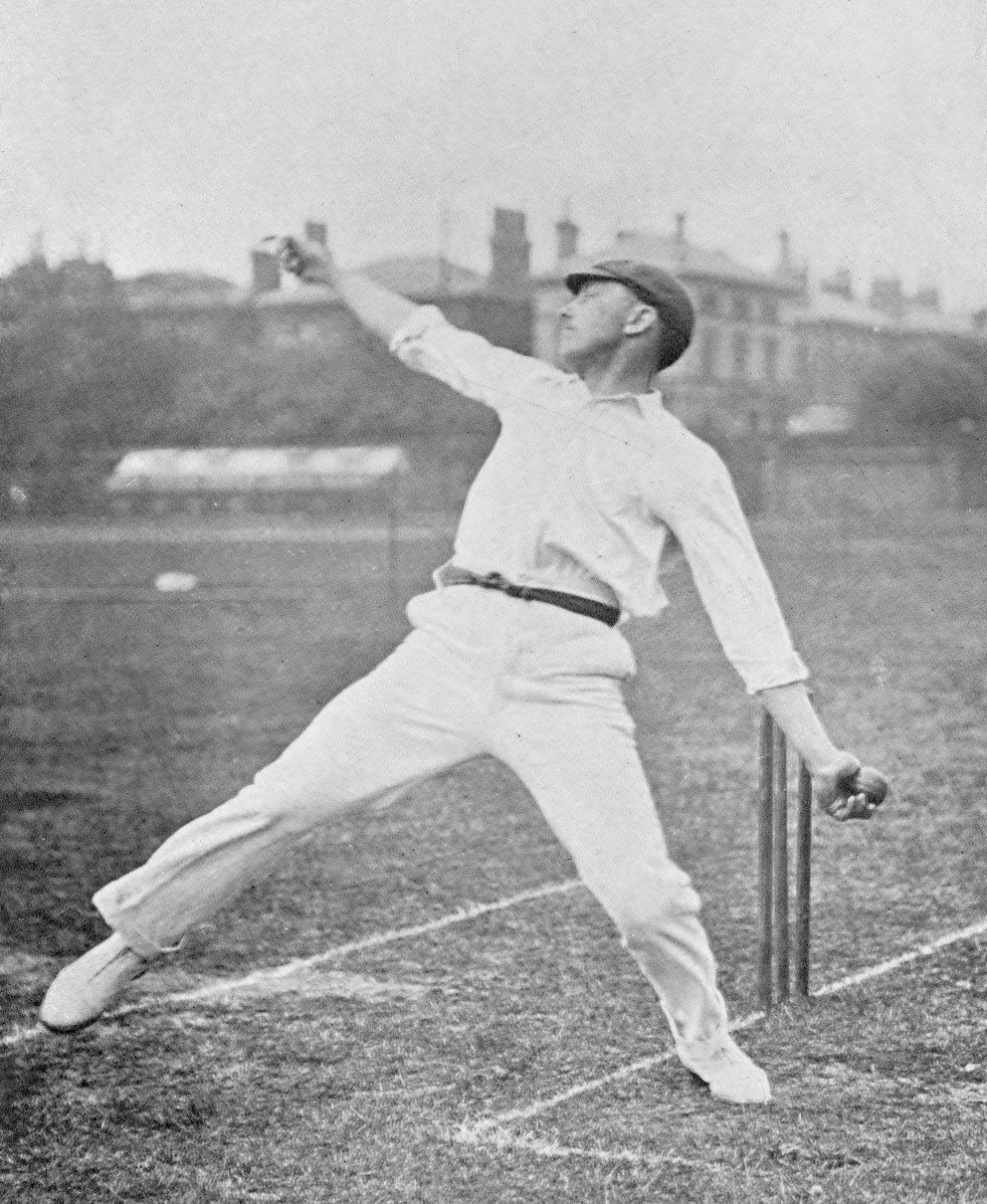
Rhodes bowling, photographed by George Beldam in 1906

As a bowler, Rhodes was recognised by critics as one of the greatest slow bowlers of all time. Very effective at dismissing batsmen on difficult pitches, it was difficult to score runs from his bowling even on a good batting surface. He could make the ball turn if the pitch offered the slightest assistance, particularly if it had been affected by rain. Cricket writer E. W. Swanton described how Rhodes had "a beautifully controlled, economical and rhythmical action which ensured supreme accuracy of length and direction. He was a master of the stock left-hander's spin and could vary it with the ball that came on with the arm." In his early years as a bowler, Rhodes was able to spin the ball very sharply, and while this ability decreased in later years, he became expert at working out a batsman's weaknesses. Critics considered him expert at flighting the ball; Neville Cardus wrote that "Flight was his secret. Flight and the curving line, now higher, now lower, tempting, inimical; every ball like every other ball, yet somehow unlike; each over in collusion with the others, part of a plot ..." In the early part of his career, his bowling partnership with Hirst – who like Rhodes had been born in Kirkheaton – was particularly effective and established a formidable reputation. As time passed, his accuracy increased to the extent that it seemed every ball landed in exactly the same place. In his first five seasons, he was top of the national bowling averages twice and in second place three times, while in the first six seasons after the war, he was first four times and second once. In his whole career, he only fell outside the top 20 in the bowling averages in four seasons.

Rhodes claimed that he preferred batting to bowling. A right-handed batsman with a good defensive technique, Rhodes was a strong driver of the ball who scored more quickly in the earlier part of his career. Analysts maintained that Rhodes had only two or three effective shots, though his technique was good. Cricket writer E. W. Swanton described Rhodes as a "craftsman rather than an artist". Neville Cardus, in his obituary of Rhodes, said that the Yorkshireman "made himself into a batsman by practice and hard thinking", and that while often "dour and parsimonious", he was capable of hitting out. After changing to the two-eyed stance more of his runs came on the leg-side; in later years, Rhodes often used his pads rather than play a shot, a tactic generally regarded as negative. A feature of his batting career was his successful opening partnership with Hobbs, particularly their enterprise in running between the wickets. In his career, he scored over 190 in an innings five times and twice scored centuries in each innings of a match. Although Rhodes's primary function varied between bowler and batsman, he recorded 16 doubles to establish a record for any cricketer.

When Rhodes was involved in matches, Cardus believed that "he was not a man given to affability", showing annoyance on the field and being critical of the performances of others. According to historian Anthony Woodhouse, Rhodes was a "dour, methodical and calculating cricketer". Not popular in the way that a player like Hirst was popular, Rhodes "commanded respect rather than plaudits" in the words of Bowes. An introvert, he did not always get along with the more extrovert Hirst, possibly owing to mutual jealousy and some of Hirst's jocular comments, and was rarely pictured smiling. However, Rhodes became more relaxed and approachable in later life, particularly after his eyesight failed. Cardus was surprised, after meeting him in 1950, at how much more readily Rhodes engaged in conversation, commenting that "history comes from his mouth in rivers". Rhodes's obituary in The Times concluded: "Gruff or mellow, he was all of a piece, a fighting Yorkshireman, superbly gifted."

== Personal life ==
In October 1899, Rhodes, aged 22, married Sarah Elizabeth Stancliffe, who lived in Kirkheaton and was two years his senior. They lived in a farmhouse, shared with other people, at Bog Hall near Kirkheaton. On 25 August 1902 his wife gave birth to a daughter, their only child. Rhodes found Yorkshire's dealings with money to be ungenerous; following his benefit in 1911 Yorkshire, as was their custom, paid only one-third of the money to Rhodes and kept back the rest to invest on his behalf, only paying out the interest. Rhodes considered this to be unfair; however, he was able to use the money to build a stone house at Marsh, Huddersfield, which his family moved into in the autumn of 1912. He lived there until 1956.

From around 1936 Rhodes's sight began to fail, and on the outbreak of war in 1939 he was unable to take up a wartime job. Eventually a specialist diagnosed glaucoma, but at that stage nothing could be done. Rhodes was still able to see well enough to watch cricket and play golf, although by 1946 he was unable to read a newspaper. Another specialist was consulted in 1951 and an operation performed, but by 1952 Rhodes was completely blind. The build-up of pain led to the removal of his left eyeball in 1958. In 1950, Sarah Rhodes suffered a heart attack, which limited the help she could give to her husband; she died in 1954, at age 79. Rhodes then sold his house at Marsh and moved in with his daughter and her husband, with whom he later moved to Bournemouth. He continued to attend cricket matches where he was able to follow the play despite his blindness, and was frequently sought out by cricketers and asked for his advice or opinion. Rhodes was given honorary life membership of Yorkshire in 1946, and of the MCC in 1949. When given membership of the MCC, along with other old professionals, Rhodes reacted characteristically; rather than showing pleasure, he responded, "I don't rightly know what it means yet." He died in 1973, aged 95.

In 2009, Rhodes was inducted into the ICC Cricket Hall of Fame.

== Bibliography ==
- Ferriday, Patrick (2021). Wilfred Rhodes: The Triumphal Arch. Brighton: Von Krumm Publishing. ISBN 978-0-9567321-8-7.
- Fry, C. B. (1986) [1939]. Life Worth Living: Some Phases of an Englishman. London: The Pavilion Library. ISBN 1-85145-026-2.
- Hill, Alan (2007). Herbert Sutcliffe: Cricket Maestro. Stroud, Gloucestershire: Stadia. ISBN 978-0-7524-4350-8.
- Hodgson, Derek (1989). The Official History of Yorkshire County Cricket Club. Ramsbury, Marlborough, Wiltshire: The Crowood Press. ISBN 1-85223-274-9.
- Rogerson, Sidney (1960). Wilfred Rhodes. London: Hollis and Carter.
- Swanton, E. W. (1999). Cricketers of My Time. London: Andre Deutsch. ISBN 0-233-99746-6.
- Thomson, A. A. (1960). Hirst and Rhodes. London: The Sportsmans Book Club.
- Warner, P. F. (2003) [1904]. How We Recovered the Ashes, an Account of the 1903–04 MCC Tour of Australia. London: Methuen. ISBN 0-413-77399-X.
- Woodhouse, Anthony (1989). The History of Yorkshire County Cricket Club. London: Christopher Helm. ISBN 0-7470-3408-7.

Preceded by Sydney Barnes	Oldest living Test cricketer 26 December 1967 – 8 July 1973	Succeeded by Plum Lewis
