= Yorkshire captaincy affair of 1927 =

Disagreement within Yorkshire County Cricket Club, England

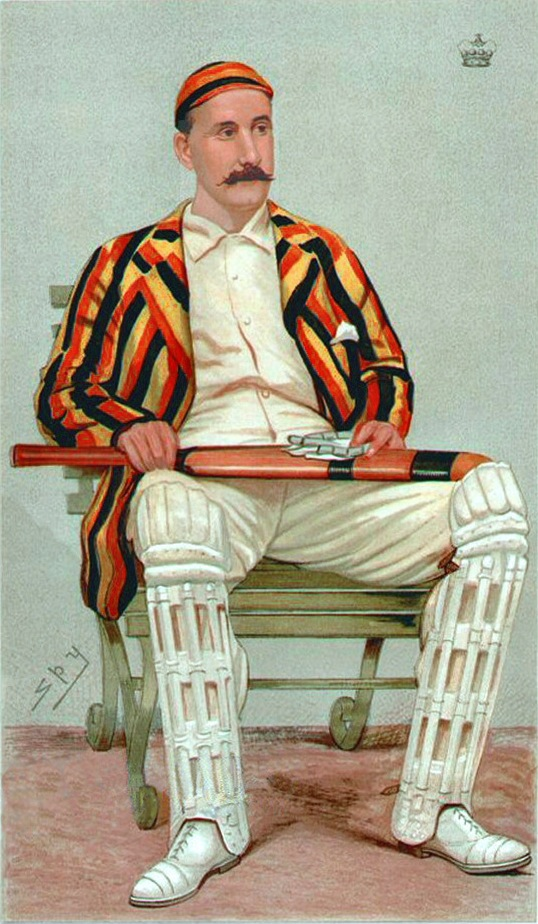
Lord Hawke in his playing days. He was a key figure in the captaincy debate.

The Yorkshire captaincy affair of 1927 arose from a disagreement among members of Yorkshire County Cricket Club over the selection of a new captain to succeed the retired Major Arthur Lupton. The main issue was whether a professional cricketer should be appointed to the post. It was a tradition throughout English county cricket that captains should always be amateurs. At Yorkshire, a succession of amateur captains held office in the 1920s, on the grounds of their supposed leadership qualities, although they were not worth their place in the team as cricketers. None lasted long; after Lupton's departure some members felt it was time to appoint a more accomplished cricketer on a long-term basis.

The Yorkshire committee, prompted by the influential county president, Lord Hawke, approached Herbert Sutcliffe, one of the side's leading professionals. After Sutcliffe's provisional acceptance of the captaincy, controversy arose. Some members objected to the appointment on the traditional grounds that Sutcliffe was not an amateur; others felt that if a professional was to be appointed, the post should be offered to the county's senior professional, Wilfred Rhodes, who had been playing much longer than Sutcliffe. Rhodes himself was offended that he had not been approached. When Sutcliffe became aware of the controversy, he withdrew his acceptance. No offer was made to Rhodes, and the county subsequently appointed amateur William Worsley as captain. He was respected by the team but had little personal success, lasted for just two seasons, and was followed by two further short-term leaders. In 1933 Brian Sellers, a more competent amateur, was appointed and became the long-serving captain that Yorkshire had sought.

== Background ==
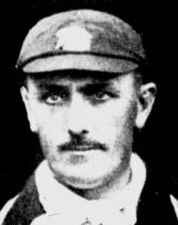
Leading Yorkshire cricketer Wilfred Rhodes, in 1920: Rhodes was a possible successor to Major Lupton as captain, and the favoured choice of many members.

In the 1920s, every English county cricket team had an amateur captain. Yorkshire had been led by amateurs since Lord Hawke took over the position in 1883. (Note: Prior to 1883, Yorkshire had been led by professionals since the club's creation in 1863. See "Officials of the Yorkshire County Cricket Club". The Yorkshire County Cricket Club Yearbook (2010 ed.). Ilkley: Great Northern Books. March 2010. pp. 8, 359–79. ISBN 978-1-905080-75-5.) Amateurs were usually from privileged backgrounds, while professionals were mainly from the working classes. Class distinctions pervaded the game, which was organised and administered by former and current amateurs. They wished to preserve leadership roles for members of the Establishment, in defiance of broader social changes that had reduced their influence in other sports. Administrators argued that amateurs were better captains as they were free from worries over employment. The Wisden editor believed that "the professional may have difficulty in enforcing discipline. He would naturally hesitate to suggest to his committee that this player or that should be dropped, and so be instrumental in depriving the man in question of some part of his livelihood. Further, feeling that an error of judgment would prejudice his standing with the committee, he might well hesitate to take risks." In 1925, Lord Hawke, then the Yorkshire president, expressing his hope that an amateur would always be available to captain the national side, had made the impromptu comment, "Pray God, no professional shall ever captain England." His remarks were widely reported in the press and heavily criticised. This was to leave Hawke in an awkward situation in 1927.

By the end of the 1927 English cricket season, Yorkshire had had a succession of short-term captains. Generally, these men were neither sufficiently good players nor leaders to merit a position in the team, but Yorkshire's side was strong enough to include them in the interest of maintaining amateur leadership. Tactically, Yorkshire's success came not from the captain but from the influence of leading professionals Wilfred Rhodes and Emmott Robinson. The captain's primary role was the enforcement of discipline: maintaining an amicable attitude within the team during games and ensuring that umpires and opponents were respected. In the early 1920s, Yorkshire had been undisciplined on the field; cricket correspondent Jim Kilburn wrote that they were in danger of becoming "social outcasts", and E. W. Swanton commented that Yorkshire's hostile attitude when fielding looked likely to jeopardise their relations with other teams. Matters came to a head in a match against Middlesex in 1924 at Sheffield. The crowd became very antagonistic and a Marylebone Cricket Club (MCC) enquiry found that a Yorkshire player had incited the unrest. Further incidents against Surrey that season led the captain Geoffrey Wilson to resign, though he led the team to the County Championship in each of his three years in charge. His resignation was possibly prompted by the Yorkshire president, Lord Hawke, but Wilson did not like the belligerent nature of the team and found it difficult to handle Rhodes.

Yorkshire appointed Major Arthur Lupton as captain, hoping that his experience in the army would allow him to exercise greater control than his predecessors had managed. Aged 46, he was old for a cricketer. He had played once for Yorkshire in 1908, but was no longer an effective batsman. He was very popular with the players, and managed to improve discipline but had little influence on team tactics. He left such matters to Rhodes and Robinson, to the point where several apocryphal stories emerged about his lack of control. In one story, Yorkshire had scored around 400. Lupton, hoping to score some easy runs, came out of the amateur dressing room with his bat when a young professional touched his arm and said, "It's all right, sir. Mr Rhodes has declared [the innings over]." After three years in charge, Lupton resigned the captaincy at the end of 1927. In their search for a successor, Yorkshire hoped to appoint a player with a better cricketing reputation who would serve for a longer term.

== Appointment of Sutcliffe ==
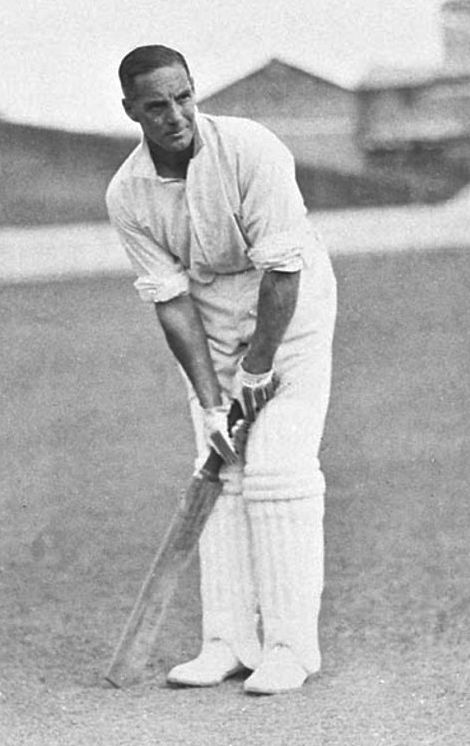
Herbert Sutcliffe during a practice session at the Sydney Cricket Ground in 1924

=== Initial approach ===
At the beginning of the 1927 season, Yorkshire secretary Frederick Toone approached Wilfred Rhodes to suggest that he should resign from his position as senior professional. (Note: The senior professional of a county side was the professional cricketer who had played for the team the longest. This player often influenced the playing style and tactics of the side.) Rhodes declined, prompted by his wife's suspicion of a plot against him. This may have been an attempt by Yorkshire to clear the way for a new captain. Lord Hawke was in favour of appointing Herbert Sutcliffe, a professional who had opened the batting for Yorkshire since 1919. In addition to Rhodes, other professionals on the side had debuted for Yorkshire earlier than Sutcliffe. However, Sutcliffe was unusual among professionals: he had received a commission in the British Army in the First World War, his appearance was always immaculate and when speaking he altered his accent to fit what he considered a better class of society. Such characteristics were more common among amateur cricketers, and Sutcliffe in many ways behaved like one. While not particularly popular with his teammates, he was respected.

Hawke asked Sir Home Gordon, a cricket writer who had assisted Hawke with his autobiography, to sound out other counties to see if they would find Sutcliffe an acceptable captain if he played as an amateur—some players switched from amateur to professional, or vice versa, around this time. Sutcliffe was en route to South Africa with the MCC touring team, but was aware that Yorkshire were considering him as a replacement for Lupton.

Sutcliffe's election was confirmed at a meeting of the club's governing committee on 2 November 1927, which voted on two proposals sponsored by Hawke. The first, to give Sutcliffe amateur status, was defeated by 19 votes to 5; the second, to appoint him captain, was carried 13–11. On 4 November, a Press Association correspondent informed Sutcliffe on board his ship that he had been appointed. Sutcliffe replied, "It is the biggest honour of my career ... I shall do my utmost to uphold the best traditions of Yorkshire and England cricket." However, six days later, having arrived in Cape Town, he sent a telegram stating, "I have not yet received by mail an official offer from the Yorkshire authorities of the captaincy of the Yorkshire team next season."

=== Reaction ===
Reports at the time said that Lord Hawke and Toone had denied all knowledge of the approach to Sutcliffe; Hawke said he supported the committee but Home Gordon later recalled that Hawke seemed indecisive about the best course of action. In the opinion of cricket writer Alan Gibson, his predicament came from his earlier criticism of professional captaincy. Wisden said that "Yorkshire cricket circles were greatly perturbed by the announcement". Most opposition to the appointment was based on objections to the idea of a professional captain. In the Yorkshire Post, several members of the county club wrote to express their opinions. Some claimed it was too great a burden for a professional to captain the team while also earning a living through the game and therefore being concerned with his personal performances. Others said that Yorkshire's amateur leaders were not given enough opportunities to prove themselves before they were replaced. It was also argued that if a suitable amateur candidate was unavailable and a professional appointment unavoidable, Wilfred Rhodes was the senior professional and longest serving player. Rhodes, drawn into the argument, said that the team would have preferred an amateur captain; he also stated that he had not been approached, which made him feel unappreciated. Other members wrote to support Sutcliffe's selection, glad a professional was openly appointed; they thought the team would be strengthened by the decision. At the beginning of December, one Yorkshire member, S. E. Grimshaw, conducted a poll: 2,264 Yorkshire members were in favour of an amateur captain, while 444 wanted a professional. If an amateur could not be found, 2,007 preferred Rhodes be captain, compared to 876 who supported Sutcliffe.

=== Withdrawal of offer ===
Following the members' poll, Yorkshire sent a telegram to Sutcliffe in South Africa, asking him to withdraw his acceptance of the captaincy. Sutcliffe replied that he had now considered the offer and was appreciative but had to decline it. When news reached the Yorkshire committee on 18 December, they appointed William Worsley, who had refused the leadership in 1924 due to farming commitments. In the words of Wisden, "Happily the trouble was eventually settled to the satisfaction of all concerned. Sutcliffe declined the honour and, an invitation being extended to Captain Worsley, that gentleman stepped into the breach." Lord Hawke sent a message which thanked Sutcliffe for "your loyalty to the club". The Yorkshire Post also paid tribute to Sutcliffe and the way he handled himself, noting that while a conflict of opinion had been inevitable, it was "carried to unreasonable lengths". Commenting on the affair, The Times expressed regret that Sutcliffe had felt obliged to turn down the leadership; it noted that amateur captains were preferable in reminding people that cricket was only a game, but that there was nothing in principle to prevent a professional from performing the role. Of Sutcliffe, it said, "One would have liked to see him lead the side, and his general popularity, combined with his skill as a batsman, makes it probable that he would have been a success. However, half the value of a captain is gone if, before he takes up his duties, people begin to question whether he is the right man for the position, and Sutcliffe has been well-advised to recognise this fact." The newspaper also pointed out that it might have been difficult to choose a skipper from a group of professionals who considered themselves eligible for the role; it added that Rhodes might have found it hard to captain the side as bowlers had historically struggled to be good leaders.

== Aftermath ==
Worsley captained for just two seasons. He struggled with the demands of fielding, while his batting was disappointing. However, he was widely respected by the team. He was slightly more effective in his second season as leader, after which he retired. The next skipper, Alan Barber, although regarded as successful, captained for just one season. He was a more accomplished batsman and a great disciplinarian. However, he chose a career in teaching, limiting his availability, and resigned. The captain after that, Frank Greenwood, also did not hold the post long, resigning due to business commitments. Lord Hawke, writing in 1932, noted there had been eight captains since he retired in 1910. While six of them won the County Championship in their first season in charge, he stated that "it is not good for a side to be always changing its captain". Only when Brian Sellers was appointed in 1933 did Yorkshire gain the leader they wanted. After skippering most games in 1932 during Greenwood's frequent absences, he remained in the role until 1947 and was considered the best county captain of his time.

When Leicestershire appointed Ewart Astill as their captain for the 1935 season, he became the first professional to lead any county on a regular basis since the 19th century. Yorkshire did not have a professional skipper in the 20th century until Vic Wilson in 1960. Alan Gibson believed that Yorkshire erred in rejecting Sutcliffe. He further argued that, if appointed, Sutcliffe would have been made England Test captain in 1931 instead of Douglas Jardine and that he would have done a good job for several years. Sutcliffe later regretted withdrawing his acceptance. In later years, he told Bill Bowes that Jack Hobbs, Sutcliffe's opening partner on the national side, should have been made England captain. According to Bowes, he said, "'Lord Hawke lifted professional cricket from there to there' ... raising his hand from knee to shoulder level. 'Professional cricketers lifted it to there,' he continued, raising his hand above his head, '—and even Lord Hawke wanted it back again. Jack Hobbs, for the sake of the professional cricketer, should have accepted.'" Sutcliffe's son Billy subsequently captained Yorkshire from 1956 to 1958.

== See also ==
- Amateur status in first-class cricket
- History of English amateur cricket

== Bibliography ==
- Birley, Derek (1999). A Social History of English Cricket. London: Aurum Press. ISBN 1-85410-941-3.
- Gibson, Alan (1979). The Cricket Captains of England. London: Cassell. ISBN 0-304-29779-8.
- Hill, Alan (2007). Herbert Sutcliffe. Cricket Maestro. Stroud, Gloucestershire: Stadia. ISBN 978-0-7524-4350-8.
- Rogerson, Sidney (1960). Wilfred Rhodes. London: Hollis and Carter.
- Ryder, Rowland (1995). Cricket Calling. London: Faber and Faber. ISBN 0-571-17476-0.
- Swanton, E. W.; Woodcock, John, eds. (1980). Barclay's World of Cricket (2nd ed.). London: Collins. ISBN 0-00-216349-7.
- Williams, Jack (1989). Cricket and England: A Cultural and Social History of Cricket in England between the Wars. London: Frank Cass. ISBN 0-7146-4861-2.
- Woodhouse, Anthony (1989). The History of Yorkshire County Cricket Club. London: Christopher Helm. ISBN 0-7470-3408-7.
