= Thomas Lupton =

Thomas Lupton may refer to:

- Thomas Goff Lupton (1791–1873), English mezzotint engraver and artist
- Thomas Cartter Lupton (1899–1977), American businessman
- Thomas Lupton, an early settler of Norwalk, Connecticut

== See also ==
- Lupton (disambiguation)
