= Emmott Robinson =

English cricketer

Emmott Robinson (16 November 1883 – 17 November 1969) was an English first-class cricketer, who played for Yorkshire County Cricket Club from 1919 to 1931. He was awarded his county cap in 1920. Robinson was a right-handed batsman who bowled right-arm fast-medium pace.

== Life and career ==
Robinson was born in Keighley, Yorkshire, England. He is remembered as a distinctive Yorkshire character with a dry sense of humour and a solid sense of purpose. Sir Neville Cardus often wrote about him with great affection in his newspaper articles, frequently referring to him as "the old Emmott". This was not an unfair description for Robinson did not make his first-class debut until the 1919 season, when cricket resumed in England after World War I. After playing for Yorkshire 2nd XI occasionally between 1904 and 1907, he had plied his trade for Ramsbottom in the Lancashire League, scoring 3607 runs (average 30.31) and taking 325 wickets (average 15.47). His innings of 181 not out v Todmorden in 1908 was the highest score in the League until 1913 when surpassed by CB Llewellyn.

in 1919, Robinson was aged 35 and yet he continued playing until 1931, when he was 47. Cardus imagined that the Lord one day gathered together a heap of Yorkshire clay, and breathed into it, saying, "Emmott Robinson, go on and bowl at the pavilion end for Yorkshire". Robinson himself had a different take on his spawning: "I reckon Mr Cardus invented me". He was known as ‘t’in swinger’ on account of his abnormal swerve.

Although he was not himself an outstanding individual player (he never played for England), he was a great team player and he was always regarded as "Wilfred's lieutenant", a reference to his role as Yorkshire's second senior professional behind Wilfred Rhodes. Many of the anecdotes and remembered incidents about Rhodes and Robinson make clear that Rhodes was the de facto captain of Yorkshire at this time, despite the club's policy of always appointing an amateur gentleman as nominal captain.

One oft-quoted anecdote, first recorded by Cardus, concerned Yorkshire's 1926 captain, Arthur Lupton, who started padding up after a wicket fell. Robinson reportedly said to him: "Tha's no need to pad up, Major. Wilfred's declaring at t'end o' t'over".

The arrangement worked well for this was one of Yorkshire's most successful periods. In the thirteen seasons that Robinson played for the first team, Yorkshire won the County Championship six times and were rarely out of contention. He was an intense competitor and was known to brood, only half in jest, on lost matches decades after stumps had been drawn.

In the early 1920s, Emmott made two winter tours to India with Abe Waddington and others to train the children of the Maharaja of Patiala, returning to England for the summer. Two of the Maharaja's sons, Yuvraj of Patiala and Raja Bhalindra Singh, both played first-class cricket. Yuvraj played in one Test for India, in 1934.

In his first-class career, Robinson played in 416 matches. He scored 9,744 runs in 460 innings (78 not out) at 25.50 with a highest score of 135*. He made seven centuries and forty eight fifties. He twice scored over a thousand runs in a season, 1,104 in 1921 and 1,097 in 1929, topping 900 on three occasions. He was a good fielder who took 322 catches. He was an effective change bowler, taking 902 wickets at 22.04. His best analysis was 9 for 36. He took five wickets in an innings thirty six times and ten wickets in a match on five occasions. He took 100 wickets in a season once: 113 in 1928. He took 96 in 1923.

Jack Hobbs said Robinson was the best swing bowler he had ever seen. Robinson was certainly protective of the new ball. If some fielder was rash enough to return it to the keeper on the bounce, a wail of "Nay, nay!" could be heard from a wincing Emmott.

After his retirement from the playing arena, Robinson became a first-class umpire. Robinson was a nephew of Wilfred Flowers, the former Nottinghamshire and England player.

Robinson died in Hinckley, Leicestershire.
