= Frances Platt Townsend Lupton =

American sculptor, painter, and miniaturist (1779–1833)

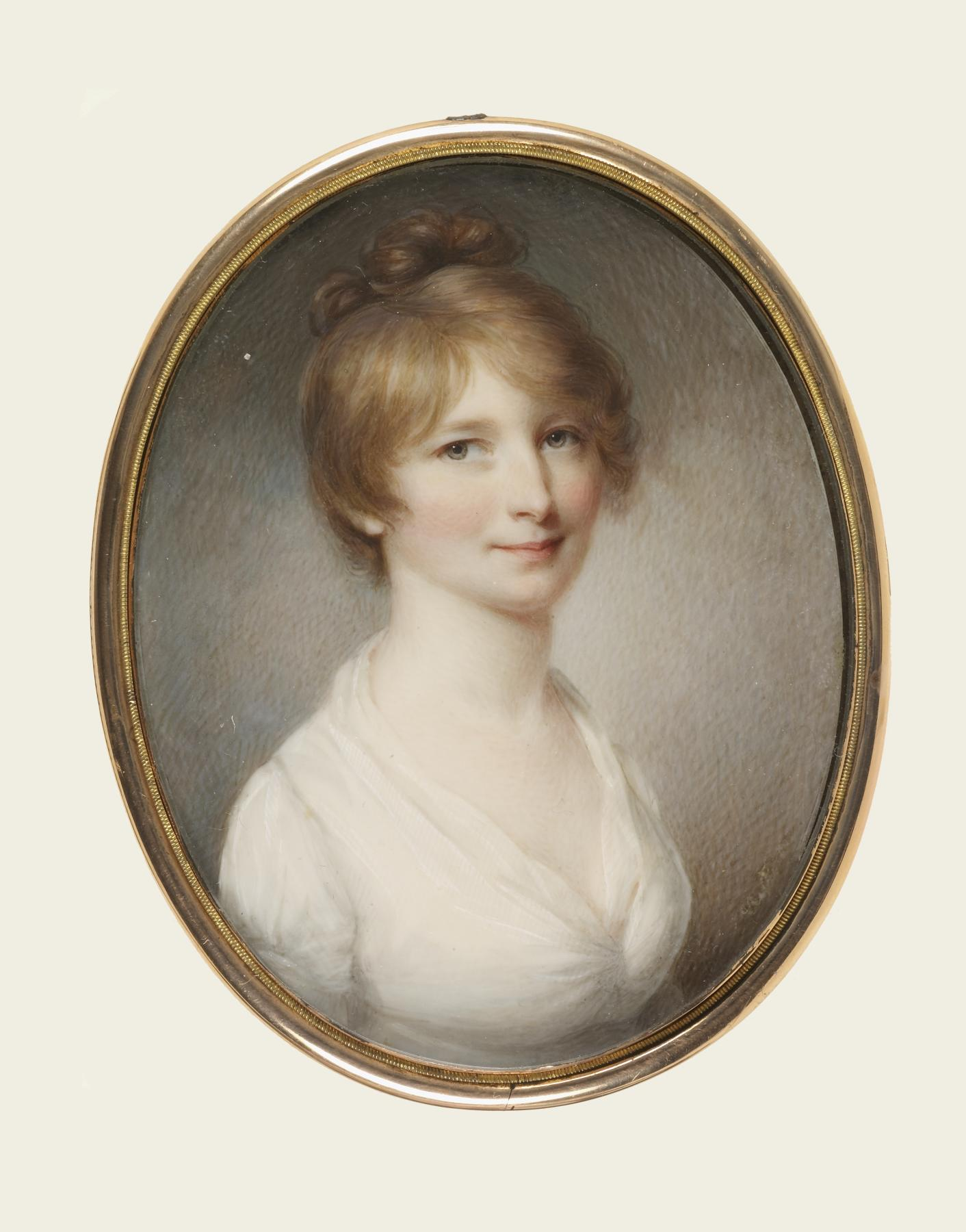
- portrait by Edwin Greene Malbone
- Born: February 17, 1779
- Died: March 5, 1833 (aged 54)

Frances Platt Townsend Lupton (February 17, 1779 – March 5, 1833) was an American sculptor, painter, and miniaturist.

Frances Platt Townsend Lupton was born on February 17, 1779, the daughter of Platt Townsend, a medical doctor in New York City. She married lawyer Lawrence Lupton in 1803, but he died six months later. Their only child, Elizabeth, died at age 14.

Lupton was the first female sculptor admitted to the National Academy of Design, in 1827. She created portrait busts of Governor Enos T. Throop and President James Madison; both works are unlocated. She also exhibited paintings and miniatures at the Academy until 1831. She was accomplished in many areas and is said to have known at least six languages.

Frances Platt Townsend Lupton died on 5 March 1833.
