= John Lupton (physicist) =

British physicist

- Education: Durham University (PhD)
- Scientific career
- Fields: Molecular physics Optics
- Workplaces: University of Regensburg
- Thesis: Nanoengineering of organic light-emitting diodes (2000)
- Doctoral advisor: Ifor Samuel
- Website: https://lupton.app.uni-regensburg.de/jlupton.php

John Mark Lupton is a British physicist based at the University of Regensburg, where he is Professor of Experimental Physics. He was Dean of the Department of Physics from 2015 to 2017 and from 2023 to 2025.

== Career ==
Lupton completed his PhD under Ifor Samuel at Durham University in 2000. After a brief spell as a research fellow at the University of St Andrews, he was subsequently a project group leader at the Max Planck Institute for Polymer Research in Mainz (2001) and an assistant within the Photonics and Optoelectronics Group at LMU Munich (2002–2006).

In 2006, while still based in Munich, Lupton received the Max Auwärter Prize of the Austrian Physical Society. He joined the University of Utah in 2006 as an associate professor, moving to the University of Regensburg in 2010.

=== Research ===
At Regensburg, Lupton heads the Organic Semiconductors and Optical Nanostructures Group (or 'Lupton Group').

He was part of a team of researchers in 2013 that developed new 'wagon-wheel' molecules with the potential to create more effective OLEDs. These molecules, because of their unusual shape, were able to generate light that was not polarized. In 2021, Lupton was co-lead of an international research collaboration that was able to measure the effect of electrons with negative mass in novel semiconductor nanostructures.

== Selected publications ==
- Lupton, John M.; Matterson, Benjamin J.; Samuel, Ifor D. W.; Jory, Michael J.; Barnes, William L. (2000). "Bragg scattering from periodically microstructured light emitting diodes". Applied Physics Letters. 77 (22): 3340–3342. Bibcode:2000ApPhL..77.3340L. doi:10.1063/1.1320023.
- Müller, J.; Lupton, J. M.; Lagoudakis, P. G.; Schindler, F.; Koeppe, R.; Rogach, A. L.; Feldmann, J.; Talapin, D. V.; Weller, H. (2005). "Wave function engineering in elongated semiconductor nanocrystals with heterogeneous carrier confinement". Nano Letters. 5 (10): 2044–2049. Bibcode:2005NanoL...5.2044M. doi:10.1021/nl051596x.
- Lupton, John M. (2010). "Single-Molecule Spectroscopy for Plastic Electronics: Materials Analysis from the Bottom-Up". Advanced Materials. 22 (15): 1689–1721. Bibcode:2010AdM....22.1689L. doi:10.1002/adma.200902306.
- Lin, Kai-Qiang; Bange, Sebastian; Lupton, John M. (2019). "Quantum interference in second-harmonic generation from monolayer WSe2". Nature Physics. 15 (3): 242–246. arXiv:1811.09479. doi:10.1038/s41567-018-0384-5.
