= John Lupton (footballer) =

English footballer

Personal information
- Full name: John Lupton
- Date of birth: 8 November 1878
- Place of birth: Liverpool, England
- Date of death: 1954 (aged 75–76)
- Position: Centre half

Senior career*
Years	Team	Apps	(Gls)
1887–1899	Bootle Wanderers		
1899–1901	Glossop	42	(0)
Total		42	(0)
- * Club domestic league appearances and goals

John Lupton (8 November 1878–1954) was an English footballer who played in the Football League for Glossop.
