= Arthur Lupton =

English cricketer and soldier

Personal information
- Full name: Arthur William Lupton
- Born: 23 February 1879; Little Horton, Bradford, Yorkshire, England
- Died: 14 April 1944 (aged 65); Carlton Manor, Guiseley, Yorkshire
- Batting: Left-handed
- Bowling: Right-arm medium
- Role: Captain

Domestic team information
- Years: Team
- 1908 to 1927: Yorkshire

Career statistics
| Competition | First-class |
|---|---|
| Matches | 109 |
| Runs scored | 724 |
| Batting average | 10.34 |
| 100s/50s | 0/0 |
| Top score | 43 not out |
| Balls bowled | 834 |
| Wickets | 14 |
| Bowling average | 32.50 |
| 5 wickets in innings | – |
| 10 wickets in match | – |
| Best bowling | 4/109 |
| Catches/stumpings | 30/– |
- Source: Cricinfo, 7 February 2016

Major Arthur William Lupton (23 February 1879 – 14 April 1944) was an English soldier and amateur first-class cricketer, who played 104 matches for Yorkshire County Cricket Club from 1908 to 1927. He also played for the Marylebone Cricket Club (MCC) (1909), the Gentlemen of England (1910) and H.D.G. Leveson-Gower's XI (1911).

== Military career ==
Lupton was commissioned a second lieutenant in The Prince of Wales's Own (West Yorkshire Regiment) on 5 May 1900. He served with the 2nd battalion of his regiment in South Africa during the Second Boer War 1899–1900, and took part in operations in Natal March–June 1900, and in Transvaal, east and west of Pretoria, July–November 1900. Following the war he received the Queen's South Africa Medal with three clasps, and he was promoted to Lieutenant on 10 January 1902.

== Cricket career ==
Born in Little Horton, Bradford, Yorkshire, England, Lupton was educated at Sedbergh School where, in 1895, he was a member of the First XI. Lupton had a modest overall record, despite the large number of games that he played. A left-handed batsman, he scored 724 runs at 10.34 with a highest score of 43 not out against Nottinghamshire in 1926. He took 14 wickets (none of them for Yorkshire) at 32.50 with his occasional right-arm fast-medium, with a best analysis for 4 for 109 for Gentlemen of England against Cambridge University in 1910.

His chief contribution was as Yorkshire's captain. Having played only one game for the county, back in 1908, he was appointed captain for the 1925 season at the age of 46. Yorkshire won the County Championship that year with 21 wins and no losses. He then led the side to second place in 1926 and third in 1927. He wanted to continue in 1928, but the Yorkshire committee, after at first deciding to appoint a professional captain, changed their minds and chose the amateur William Worsley who, like Lupton, was a member of the Yorkshire Gentleman's Cricket Club.

== Family life and death ==
Lupton was the son of William C. Lupton who had been thrice Mayor of Bradford. In 1909, at St John's, Leeds Parish Church, Arthur Lupton married Kate Fosdick, daughter of colliery owner Richard Fosdick, of Belmont, Stanmore, Harrow. Kate was born on 29 August 1879 in Windemere near Kendall, Westmoreland. The couple honeymooned in Switzerland. Lupton died in April 1944 at Carlton Manor, Guiseley, Yorkshire.
